= BTS, the Best =

- Digital and regular edition cover

Compilation album by BTS
- Released: June 16, 2021
- Recorded: c. 2017 – c. 2021
- Genre: J-pop
- Length: 88:55 (digital); 92:16 (physical)
- Languages: Japanese; English
- Labels: Universal Japan; Def Jam; Virgin; Big Hit
- Producers: Andrew Taggart; Back Number; David Stewart; Gustav Mared; Uta; Pdogg; Soma Genda

BTS chronology
Be (2020)	BTS, the Best (2021)	Proof (2022)

Singles from BTS, the Best
- 1. "Film Out" Released: April 2, 2021

Professional ratings
Review scores
Source	Rating
AllMusic	4/5 stars

BTS, the Best is the second Japanese-language compilation album by South Korean boy band BTS. It was released on June 16, 2021, through Big Hit Music, Universal Music Japan sublabel Virgin Music and Def Jam Recordings. The album is a compilation of their previous two Japanese-language studio albums, Face Yourself (2018) and Map of the Soul: 7 – The Journey (2020). It was a commercial success in Japan, reaching number one on the Oricon Albums Chart, and earned the biggest first week sales for an album in 2021 domestically. BTS became the first South Korean group to surpass the 1 million sales mark for an album in the country.

== Background ==
BTS announced the release of a new Japanese song, "Film Out" on February 16, 2021. The song was written by BTS member Jungkook in collaboration with Iyori Shimizu, the vocalist of Japanese rock power trio Back Number. It is slated to serve as the ending theme song of the movie Signal the Movie Cold Case Investigation Unit (2021). On March 26, the band released the music video teaser of the song and simultaneously announced the release of a new Japanese-language album, BTS, the Best. The track list was also announced simultaneously. The album contains all of the band's previous Japanese releases since 2017, while including their English-language 2020 single, "Dynamite" as a bonus track. Seven versions of the album had been announced with various supportive materials in each version, such as different posters, photo cards and artwork.

== Commercial performance ==
BTS, the Best debuted at number one on Oricon's Daily Album Chart dated June 15, 2021, with 571,589 physical copies sold in a single day to become the best-selling album of the year upon release. It debuted atop the Weekly Albums Chart issue dated June 28, 2021, for the period ending June 20, with 782,369 copies sold, recording the highest first week sales by a male foreign artist, and the second-highest first week sales for a foreign artist in Oricon chart history—Mariah Carey's greatest hits album #1's sold 1.047 million copies its opening week in 1998. The album spent three consecutive weeks at number one on the Oricon chart and sold over 885,000 copies in that time. It additionally topped the corresponding issue of Oricon's Digital Album Chart for its release week with 7,603 digital sales, and debuted at number-one on Billboard Japan's Hot Albums chart with 807,056 copies sold.

On December 22, Oricon announced that BTS, the Best was the best-selling physical album of 2021 in Japan with sales of 992,837 copies per data aggregated during the period dated December 14, 2020 to December 12, 2021. BTS are the first group in Oricon history, the first foreign artist in 37 years since Michael Jackson with Thriller (sold 575,000 copies 1984), and the third foreign artist overall following Elvis Presley in 1971 (sold 225,000 copies of "You Don't Have to Say You Love Me") and the aforementioned Jackson, to top the year-end album sales ranking. The album was additionally the fifth best-performing digital album of the year, with 21,082 downloads. In January 2022, the album surpassed sales of 1 million copies on Oricon, making it the first by a South Korean group in history to do so, and the first by a foreign act in over 16 years since BoA's Best of Soul (2005).

According to the International Federation of the Phonographic Industry's (IFPI) annual music report for 2021, BTS, the Best was the fourth best-selling (Note: combined global physical sales and digital album downloads) album of the year globally, with 1.52 million copies sold.

== Accolades ==
Awards and nominations
Organization	Year	Award	Result	Ref.
36th Japan Gold Disc Awards	2021	Best 3 Albums in the Asia	Won	
36th Japan Gold Disc Awards	2021	Album of the Year (Asia)	Won	

== Track listing ==
All Japanese lyrics are written by KM-Markit.

Disc 1
No.	Title	Lyrics	Producer(s)	Length
1.	"Film Out"	Iyori Shimizu; Jungkook	Back Number; UTA	3:36
2.	"DNA" (Japanese Version; from Face Yourself, 2018)	"Hitman" Bang; Kass; Pdogg; RM; Suga; Supreme Boi	Pdogg	3:43
3.	"Best of Me" (Japanese Version; from Face Yourself, 2018)	"Hitman" Bang; Adora; Andrew Taggart; Ashton Foster; J-Hope; Pdogg; RM; Ray Michael Djan Jr.; Sam Klemper; Suga	Andrew Taggart; Pdogg	3:48
4.	"Lights" (from Map of the Soul: 7 ~The Journey ~, 2020)	UTA; Yohei; Sunny Boy	UTA	4:50
5.	"Blood Sweat & Tears (血、汗、涙, Chi, ase, namida)" (Japanese Version; from Face Yourself, 2018)	Pdogg; RM; Suga; J-Hope; "Hitman" Bang; Kim Do Hoon	Pdogg	3:36
6.	"Fake Love" (Japanese Version; from Map of the Soul:7 ~The Journey ~, 2020)	"Hitman" Bang; Pdogg; RM	Pdogg	4:02
7.	"Black Swan" (Japanese version; from Map of the Soul:7 ~The Journey ~, 2020)	August Rigo; Clyde Kelly; Pdogg; RM; Vince Nantes	Pdogg	3:19
8.	"Airplane Pt. 2" (Japanese version; from Map of the Soul:7 ~The Journey ~, 2020)	"Hitman" Bang; Ali Tamposi; J-Hope; Liza Owen; Pdogg; RM; Roman Campolo; Suga	Pdogg	3:39
9.	"Go Go" (Japanese version; from Face Yourself, 2018)	"Hitman" Bang; Pdogg; Supreme Boi	Pdogg	3:56
10.	"Idol" (Japanese version; from Map of the Soul:7 ~The Journey ~, 2020)	"Hitman" Bang; Ali Tamposi; Pdogg; RM; Roman Campolo; Supreme Boi	Pdogg	3:43
11.	"Dionysus" (Japanese version; from Map of the Soul:7 ~The Journey ~, 2020)	J-Hope; Pdogg; RM; Roman Campolo; Suga; Supreme Boi	Pdogg	4:09
12.	"Mic Drop" (Japanese version; from Face Yourself, 2018)	"Hitman" Bang; J-Hope; Pdogg; RM; Supreme Boi	Pdogg	3:59
Total length:				46:25

Disc 1: Physical edition bonus track
No.	Title	Lyrics	Producer	Length
13.	"Dynamite" (from Be, 2020)	David Stewart; Jessica Agombar	David Stewart	3:19
Total length:				49:46

Disc 2
No.	Title	Lyrics	Producer(s)	Length
1.	"Boy with Luv" (Japanese version; from Map of the Soul:7 ~The Journey ~, 2020)	"Hitman" Bang; Emily Weisband; J-Hope; Melanie Joy Fontana; Michel "Lindgren" Schulz; Pdogg; RM; Suga	Pdogg	3:50
2.	"Stay Gold" (from Map of the Soul:7 ~The Journey ~, 2020)	Jun; KM-Markit; Melanie Joy Fontana; Michel "Lindgren" Schulz; Sunny Boy; UTA	UTA	4:03
3.	"Let Go" (from Face Yourself, 2018)	Hiro; Jun; UTA; Sunny Boy	UTA	4:57
4.	"Spring Day" (Japanese version; from Face Yourself, 2018)	"hitman" bang; Adora; RM; Suga; Arlissa Ruppert; Pdogg; Peter Ibsen	Pdogg	4:36
5.	"On" (Japanese version; from Map of the Soul:7 ~The Journey ~, 2020)	Antonina Armato; August Rigo; J-Hope; Julia Ross; Krysta Youngs; Melanie Joy Fontana; Michel "Lindgren" Schulz; Pdogg; RM; Suga	Pdogg	4:07
6.	"Don't Leave Me" (from Face Yourself, 2018)	Hiro; UTA; Sunny Boy; Pdogg	UTA; Pdogg	3:46
7.	"Not Today" (Japanese version; from Face Yourself, 2018)	"Hitman" Bang; Adora; June; Pdogg; RM; Supreme Boi	Pdogg	3:54
8.	"Make It Right" (Japanese version; from Map of the Soul:7 ~The Journey ~, 2020)	Benjy Gibson; Ed Sheeran; Fred Gibson; J-Hope; Jo Hill; RM; Suga	Fred	3:45
9.	"Your Eyes Tell" (from Map of the Soul:7 ~The Journey ~, 2020)	Gustav Mared; UTA; Jungkook; Jun	Gustav Mared	4:05
10.	"Crystal Snow" (from Face Yourself, 2018)	Kanata Okajima; Soma Genda; RM	Soma Genda	5:22
Total length:				42:30

Disc 3 [Blu-ray / DVD]
No.	Title	Director(s)	Length
1.	"Film Out" (music video)	Choi Yongseok (Lumpens)	3:44
2.	"Stay Gold" (music video)	Ko Yoo Jeong	4:05
3.	"Lights" (music video)	Doori Kwak (GDW)	5:27
4.	"Airplane Pt. 2" (Japanese version; music video)	Choi Yongseok	3:47
5.	"Mic Drop" (Japanese version; music video)	Woogie Kim (GDW)	4:30
6.	"Blood Sweat & Tears" (Japanese version; music video)	Choi Yongseok	4:13

Disc 3 [Blu-ray] / Disc 4 [DVD]
No.	Title	Length
7.	"Making of jacket photos"	31:48
8.	"Film Out" (making of music video)	25:08
9.	"Stay Gold" (making of music video) (Additional Edition)	22:13
10.	"Lights" (making of music video) (Additional Edition)	21:11
11.	"Airplane Pt. 2" (Japanese version; making of music video) (Additional Edition)	22:15
12.	"Mic Drop" (Japanese version; making of music video) (Additional Edition)	22:35
13.	"Blood Sweat & Tears" (Japanese version; making of music video) (Additional Edition)	21:49
Total length:		192:45

Notes:

- "Fake Love", "Idol" and "On" are stylized in all caps.

== Charts ==
=== Weekly charts ===
Weekly chart performance
Chart (2021)	Peak position
Australian Albums (ARIA)	31
Austrian Albums (Ö3 Austria)	8
Belgian Albums (Ultratop Flanders)	8
Belgian Albums (Ultratop Wallonia)	10
Canadian Albums (Billboard)	45
Croatian International Albums (HDU)	7
French Albums (SNEP)	23
German Albums (Offizielle Top 100)	6
Hungarian Albums (MAHASZ)	6
Irish Albums (Official Charts)	45
Italian Albums (FIMI)	43
Japanese Albums (Oricon)	1
Japanese Hot Albums (Billboard Japan)	1
New Zealand Albums (RMNZ)	30
Polish Albums (ZPAV)	29
Portuguese Albums (AFP)	2
Slovak Albums (ČNS IFPI)	29
Spanish Albums (Promusicae)	26
Swiss Albums (Schweizer Hitparade)	5
UK Albums (Official Charts)	71
US Billboard 200	19
US World Albums (Billboard)	1

=== Monthly charts ===
Monthly chart performance
Chart (2021)	Peak position
Japanese Albums (Oricon)	1

=== Year-end charts ===
Year-end chart performance
Chart (2021)	Position
Hungarian Albums (MAHASZ)	61
Japanese Albums (Oricon)	1
Japanese Hot Albums (Billboard Japan)	1

Year-end chart performance
Chart (2022)	Position
Japanese Albums (Oricon)	77
Japanese Hot Albums (Billboard Japan)	56

== Certifications ==
Certifications and sales
Region	Certification	Certified units/sales
Japan (RIAJ)	Million	1,000,000^{^}
South Korea	—	1,188
United Kingdom (BPI)	Silver	60,000^{‡}
^{^} Shipments figures based on certification alone.^{‡} Sales+streaming figures based on certification alone.

== Release history ==
Release formats for BTS, the Best
Region	Date	Format(s)	Label	Edition	Ref.
Various	June 16, 2021	Digital download; streaming	Universal Japan; Virgin; Big Hit	Regular	
Japan	June 16, 2021	2CD + Blu-ray	Universal Japan	Limited A	
Japan	June 16, 2021	2CD + 2DVD	Universal Japan	Limited B	
Japan	June 16, 2021	2CD	Universal Japan	Limited C	
Japan	June 16, 2021	2CD	Universal Japan	Regular	
Various	August 6, 2021	See above	Universal Japan	See above	

== See also ==
- Album era
- List of Oricon number-one albums of 2021
- List of Billboard Japan Hot Albums number ones of 2021
- List of K-pop albums on the Billboard charts
