= Map of the Soul: 7 – The Journey =

- Digital and Regular Edition cover

Studio album by BTS
- Released: July 14, 2020
- Studios: Tiny Voice Production, Tokyo; Dogg Bounce and Big Hit, Seoul; The EchoBar Recording, Los Angeles; the One with the Big Bulb
- Genre: Pop
- Length: 46:22
- Languages: Japanese; English
- Labels: Big Hit; Universal; Def Jam
- Producer: Pdogg

BTS chronology
Map of the Soul: 7 (2020)	Map of the Soul: 7 – The Journey (2020)	Be (2020)

Singles from Map of the Soul: 7 – The Journey
- 1. "Stay Gold" Released: June 19, 2020; 2. "Your Eyes Tell" Released: July 14, 2020

Professional ratings
Review scores
Source	Rating
AllMusic	3.5/5 stars

Map of the Soul: 7 – The Journey (stylized as MAP OF THE SOUL: 7 ~THE JOURNEY~) is the fourth Japanese and eighth overall studio album by South Korean boy band BTS. The release served as the band's next Japanese offering after Face Yourself, the album was released on July 14, 2020, through Universal Music Japan and Big Hit Entertainment. The album contains Japanese versions of songs from Love Yourself: Answer (2018), Map of the Soul: Persona (2019), and Map of the Soul: 7 (2020), as well as four new tracks: two instrumentals, "Intro: Calling" and "Outro: The Journey", and two original songs, lead single "Stay Gold", and "Your Eyes Tell" which was written by Jungkook. Previously released 2019 single "Lights" was also included.

The album was BTS' sixth to debut at number one in Japan, and their second of 2020 after Map of the Soul: 7. It sold 500,000 copies in its first two days of release and broke the record for highest first week sales of 2020 with 564,000 copies to become the most sold album of the year at the time. It also set a new all-time record for the highest first week sales by a male foreign artist, surpassing DBSK's ten-year record of 413,000 copies sold. The Recording Industry Association of Japan (RIAJ) certified the album Triple Platinum in its fourth week of release for surpassing sales of 750,000 physical copies. The album was nominated for and won Album of the Year, and Best 3 Albums (together with Map of the Soul: 7 and Be) in the Asia sub-category at the 35th Japan Gold Disc Awards in March 2021.

Elsewhere, the album achieved top-20 chart placements in six territories, top-10 in four, and top-five in six. It was BTS' first Japanese release to debut at number one in Portugal, and became the band's tenth chart-topper on the Billboard World Albums Chart when it peaked at number one in August after the physical album became available in the United States.

== Background ==
Billboard Japan first broke the news of a potential Japanese album on March 26, 2020, when it announced that a new BTS song titled "Stay Gold" had been selected as the theme for then upcoming Japanese television drama, Spiral Labyrinth – DNA Forensic Investigation (らせんの 迷宮 - DNA 科学捜査, Rasen no Meikyū – DNA Kagaku Sōsa). Billboard also stated that the song would be part of the band's "fourth Japanese album scheduled to be released this summer". In response to additional reports made in April that a Japanese version of "On" from Map of the Soul: 7 would also be included, Big Hit Entertainment only confirmed that an album would be released in July and stated that further information would be given once official schedules were finalized.

On May 7, BTS' fourth Japanese album was officially announced, marking the band's first full-length work in the language in two years since Face Yourself (2018). The album's title, Map of the Soul: 7 ~ The Journey ~, and July 14 release date were revealed, along with a complete 13-song tracklist and details of the various physical versions that would be available for purchase and their accompanying bonuses. The tracklist contained Japanese versions of "On", "Black Swan", "Make It Right", and "Dionysus", four new songs: "Intro: Calling", lead single "Stay Gold", "Your Eyes Tell" written by Jungkook, and "Outro: The Journey", and BTS' third original Japanese single "Lights" (2019). The first group concept photo was also unveiled: a monochrome image of the band in black suits, seated on stage against a curtained backdrop. The second group concept image was published on May 22 and featured the band in pastel clothes against a colorful 2D illustrated background. A series of seven further individual teaser images were shared online from June 12–18. These solo pictures featured the same monochromatic visual theme as the first group concept photo. Album jacket photos showing the official artwork for each of the album's editions were revealed on May 28. Universal Music Japan posted a music spot video featuring an audio snippet of "Stay Gold" to its YouTube channel on May 14. The clip garnered over 880,000 views within a week of release. A second and final music spot video, this time featuring "Lights" together with "Boy With Luv" and "Stay Gold", was uploaded on July 12.

Physical pre-orders for Japan, South Korea and other territories began on May 8, while US pre-orders began just over one month later on June 11 through Weverse Shop, and June 15 for Target, Amazon, and other US retailers. Global digital pre-save of the album began on June 19 across various online music platforms.

== Conception ==
The album's title is reflective of its theme, which maps BTS' seven-year journey since their debut in 2013, and the "many joys, successes, hardships, and challenges" they experienced during this time while on their "quest for the answer of the journey that will never end". In keeping with this, lead single "Stay Gold" conveys the message that "The world may not be full of good things, but please don't lose your luster." It was written and produced by longtime collaborator UTA, who has worked with the band on several other Japanese releases since 2015.

"Your Eyes Tell" is an original, "lush, string-laden ballad" created by BTS vocalist Jungkook. Having heard that preparations for a new Japanese album were ongoing, director Takahiro Miki, of then upcoming Japanese romance film Your Eyes Tell, (Note: a remake of the 2011 South Korean film Always; released on October 23, 2020.) reached out to the band about working on a possible soundtrack for the movie. Jungkook wrote the song after reading the film's script and watching its incomplete (at the time) footage. The lyrics embrace the concept of watching over someone protectively, and express "the beautiful and deep perspective of love" as portrayed in the film. Though originally intended for use on his as yet unnamed and unreleased mixtape, the track was sent in as a last minute submission for consideration alongside other demos from the band, just before recording of the soundtrack was set to begin. After hearing the song, which went in a completely different musical direction to the others, Miki felt that the "shining melody", "relaxed singing vocals", and the way the lyrics incorporated use of the film's keyword "watching", matched the movie so well that he decided to also use it during the film, instead of solely for the ending credits. It is the first time an original song was written by a foreign artist for a Japanese film, and the first movie theme of BTS' career. Accordingly, the song was selected for inclusion on the album as well.

== Release and promotion ==
=== Distribution ===
The album was released on July 14. Limited territories outside of Japan received the physical editions on the same day; the digital album was available globally. A staggered rollout for physicals occurred due to worldwide shipping restrictions put in place by various countries in light of the COVID-19 pandemic. Eight versions of the album were made available: four Limited Editions A-D, a CD only Regular Edition, and three limited editions of the regular edition. Limited Editions A and B contain content viewable on Blu-ray and DVD respectively, a 32-page booklet, and sticker sheets A and B individually. Limited Editions C and D include a 56-page photo booklet, in versions A and B respectively. Conversely, the CD-only Regular Edition comes with a 20-page lyric booklet instead and one of seven random "Selfie ver." photocards included as a first-press only bonus. The Universal Music Store, BTS Japan Official Fanclub, and SevenNet versions of the regular edition also include a 20-page lyric booklet, with the first two having one of seven random "Colourful ver." and "Monochrome ver." photocards respectively as their bonuses, and the third an exclusive set of seven jacket changing cards. All albums share the same track listing.

=== Marketing ===
In May, it was announced that BTS would appear in the August 2020 edition of Vogue Japan slated for release on June 27. Pre-orders for the magazine quickly sold out at online bookstores in South Korea and Japan. Vogue posted a short video clip from the exclusive photoshoot to their website and official Twitter on June 23, and a group teaser photo to their official Instagram on June 24. The issue contained an 8-page photo spread of the band and an interview that also included a segment about the new album; it was BTS' first ever appearance in the magazine.

The release of a two-part, web-based movie, BTS Music Journey, was announced on June 5 as a gift to the band's Japanese fans. Initially available for limited time viewing in Japan only on special website, bts-mapofthesoul7.jp, via web browser Brave, which also featured a unique BTS-themed home screen, it was later opened to viewers in South Korea and the US on July 31 until September 30. Part one was published on June 20 and contained a 24-minute long group interview where BTS discussed their thoughts on the new album and its making, revealed never before shared "secret stories", and "reminisced with fans on the last seven years of memories". Part two, featuring sub-unit interviews, was released on July 23. On July 1, MTV Japan announced a special programming schedule featuring blocks of selected BTS content that began airing on its network from July 9 and continued throughout the month in commemoration of the new album's release. TV Tokyo aired an exclusive 55-minute long, in-depth interview with the band, titled BTS Journey: ~The Journey of 7~, on July 5. The program was broadcast across six TXN stations to audiences in Tokyo, Osaka, Aichi, Setouchi, Hokkaido, and Kyushu. Commenting on a feature program being aired for BTS, the Japan Dong-a Ilbo wrote: "Famous Japanese singers are rarely seen to have a single special broadcast before their comeback," and noted domestic media's increased interest towards the band in recent times. The program was posted online in three parts to the special website for limited time viewing until September 30. Part one was uploaded on August 8, with parts two and three to be announced in the near future.

Yunika Vision ran a half-hour long special feature of seven BTS music videos including "Stay Gold" on its screens in front of Seibu-Shinjuku Station from July 6 to July 12; the feature was also accessible for mobile viewing with high-quality sound via the "VISION α" app. The complex later ran a Billboard Japan Hot 100 airplay feature of "Stay Gold" from July 28 to August 4; the music video was shown five times a day during that time.

The band appeared on several Japanese morning television shows for promotional Q&A sessions and remote interviews including Fuji TV's Mezamashi TV, NTV's Zip! Showbiz and Oha! 4 News Live, KBC's Asadesu, Nagoya TV's Dodesuka! and Delsata, TBS's Gutto Luck! (Good Luck!) and King's Brunch, and ABC TV's Good Morning Call ABC.

=== Singles ===
"Stay Gold" preceded the album with a digital release on June 19, 2020. In South Korea, the song immediately entered the real-time charts of domestic music streaming sites, marking the first time one of BTS' original Japanese songs entered said charts. In Japan, it debuted at number two on Oricon's Daily Digital Single chart, peaked at number six on the Weekly Digital Single chart, and at number twelve on the Billboard Japan Hot 100 respectively. In North America, with just over 10,000 copies sold, the song debuted at number one on Billboard's World Digital Song Sales chart, number six on the all-genre Digital Songs Sales chart, and number nine on the Bubbling Under Hot 100. Forbes reviewed the single favourably, describing it as a "soothing, uplifting track...blending bouncy hip-hop beats on the verses and power-pop production on the choruses" and "...a comforting pop blanket with its scaling, surging hook encouraging listeners to "stay gold", delivering empowering words at a time when many need it". The music video for "Stay Gold" was published on Big Hit's official YouTube channel on June 26, with an exclusive video message to fans from the band airing during the live countdown to the online premiere, one minute before release. It became BTS' fastest Japanese music video to attain 50 million views, doing so in five days, and surpassed 100 million views in August.

The first audio preview of "Your Eyes Tell" was revealed on July 9, 2020—it featured in the extended trailer for its namesake film. After the album was released, the Jungkook-penned track debuted at number one in Japan on Oricon's Daily Digital single chart with over 13,000 copies sold. It also topped real-time and daily charts of several of the biggest domestic music sites including Line Music, where it remained in the top position for a record six consecutive days. At the end of its first tracking week, "Your Eyes Tell" was the third most-streamed song according to Oricon for the period July 13–19, with over 5.1 million streams, giving it the biggest streaming debut in history for a song by a Korean act in Japan. It entered the Weekly Digital Single chart at number five, and the Billboard Japan Hot 100 at number eight. The single was certified gold by the Recording Industry Association of Japan (RIAJ) in March 2021, for surpassing 50 million streams. It received platinum certification in November 2022, for surpassing 100 million streams. In North America, "Your Eyes Tell" became BTS' 21st number one on the Billboard World Digital Song Sales chart, and their 125th entry overall, when it debuted in the top position for the same charting period as the album with 8,000 copies sold. It was the band's 15th entry on the ranking for that week, the most amongst all acts listed. The song also entered the Digital Song Sales chart at number 12, and the Canadian Digital Song Sales chart at number 18. Canadian electronic dance music duo Adventure Club and future bass producer Soar collaborated on a dubstep remix of the track featuring "fluctuating synths" and "plenty of super melodic and bass elements" released on July 21. Edm.com dubbed it "a mammoth remix" and a "serendipitous rework" with "all the lushness and euphoric gravitas of a signature Adventure Club tune." Dancing Astronaut called it "emotive", stating that "Adventure Club and Soar simply add the level of attitude that only drums can provide." Youredm.com described the remix as "beautiful" and "heavenly", writing that the original was "equally beautiful with soaring melodies and the band's harmonious vocals."

=== Live performances ===
BTS held the premiere performance of "Stay Gold" on TBS Japan's CDTV Live! Live! on June 22 via pre-recorded video. They guested on NTV's Sukkiri on July 13 for their second performance of "Stay Gold". The band presented the song later that same week on the July 17 broadcast of NTV's Buzz Rhythm 02, and again the following day on NHK's SONGS on July 18 together with "Black Swan". It was BTS' first appearance on SONGS in two years.

The band performed "Your Eyes Tell" for the first time on CDTV Live! Live! on July 13. Reviewing the performance post-broadcast, Real Sound's Tomoko Furuya mentioned the song's "beautiful melody...characterized by a relaxed and gentle sound", and complimented the way the band "always appeal to [the listener] about the meaning of the lyrics even though the song is not in their native language". Regarding the vocalists, Furuya wrote that Jungkook's "calm singing voice reassured the listener", V's voice "has such a charm that you can feel the depth even when he sings high notes", Jin's "beautiful" voice "pierced the heart", and that "the way Jimin sings strongly conveys the emotions of the lyrics". He also took note of the gentler style adopted by the rappers as the song is slower than their usual Korean rap verses, and how they delivered their lines in a "cool and refreshing manner". Two weeks later, BTS were featured in the July 26 episode of Fuji TV's Love Music where they performed the song again.

== Commercial performance ==
=== Japan ===
The album debuted at number one on the Oricon Daily Albums Chart having sold 447,869 copies within 24 hours of release. It surpassed BTS' previous Japanese album, 2018 predecessor Face Yourself's first day sales of 188,000 albums by more than twice as many copies. With these numbers, Map of the Soul: 7 – The Journey set new records for the highest first day sales by both a foreign and Korean artist in Japan, and became the highest selling album of 2020 out of all albums released in the country up to that time. It crossed an accumulated 500,000 copies sold on its second day, more than double Face Yourself's initial three days sales combined, and was the first 2020 album to exceed as many units. The album maintained its position atop the daily chart for six consecutive days. On July 21, 2020, at the end of its first week, Oricon reported that Map of the Soul: 7 – The Journey had debuted at number one on the Weekly Album Chart issue dated July 27, for the period July 13–19 with over 564,000 copies sold, breaking the record for highest first week sales of 2020 and becoming the most sold album of the year at the time. (Note: Prior to Map of the Soul: 7 – The Journey's release in July, the best selling album of 2020 in its first tracking week was Japanese rock band King Gnu's third studio album Ceremony, released on January 15 with 238,000 sales. BTS' record was surpassed in August by Japanese soloist Kenshi Yonezu with the release of his fifth studio album Stray Sheep, which sold over 880,000 copies its first week.) The album was BTS' sixth overall to debut at number one in Japan, and their second of the year after Map of the Soul: 7 in February. The band additionally set a new all-time record for the best-selling album by a male foreign artist in its first week of tracking, breaking a ten-year record previously held by DBSK's greatest hits album, Best Selection 2010. (Note: The record was originally set in 1995 when American rock band Bon Jovi's sixth studio album These Days sold 379,000 copies in its first week. South Korean pop group DBSK were the first act in 14 years to break that record when they sold 413,000 copies of their greatest hits album Best Selection 2010 in 2010. Their record remained unbroken for 10 years until BTS surpassed it in 2020.) The album crossed 600,000 copies in its third week, and went on to debut atop the Monthly Albums Chart for July with 605,785 copies sold. It was certified Triple Platinum by the RIAJ in its fourth week, on August 7, signifying 750,000 copies sold.

At the end of 2020, Map of the Soul: 7 – The Journey ranked fourth on Billboard Japan's Hot Albums Year End Chart. It was the third best-selling and the 22nd most-downloaded album in Japan overall.

=== Other territories ===
In North America, BTS marked their 12th entry on the Billboard 200 when Map of the Soul: 7 – The Journey debuted at number 115 on the chart issue dated July 21, 2020, for the week of July 25 with only two days of tracking and no physical release—it sold 8,000 equivalent album units—extending the band's record for the most entries amongst all K-pop acts. The album entered the World Albums chart at number two, giving BTS their 13th top-five entry on the World chart and marking the 29th consecutive week that releases from the group occupied the top three—Map of the Soul:7 (2020) and Love Yourself: Answer (2018) maintained their respective places at number one and number three. No other act has ever accomplished this since the chart's inception in 1990. The album also entered the Top Album Sales chart at number 19. It returned to the Billboard 200 the following month, after the physical release became available on August 7, and sold 28,000 copies for the week ending August 13 to rise to a new peak at number 14 on the chart issue dated August 22. The album is BTS' second and highest-charting Japanese-language entry on the ranking—Face Yourself (2018) debuted and peaked at number 43—and their seventh top-40 and sixth top-20 title respectively. It also peaked atop the World Albums chart for the same period, the band's milestone 10th number-one there.

In Canada, Map of the Soul: 7 – The Journey entered the Billboard Canadian Albums chart at number 90. It is BTS' 10th offering to appear on the 100-spot ranking, making the band the first and only Korean act to accumulate as many entries on the tally. In the UK, the album debuted at number 56 on the Official Albums Chart, also with only two days of tracking and no physical sales included, breaking the record previously held by Face Yourself—at number 78—for the highest-charting Japanese album by a Korean act on said chart. It also entered both the component Singles Sales and Singles Downloads Top 100 charts respectively at number 12. The album re-entered the albums chart in August, at a new peak of 35, with the advent of the physical release becoming available, giving the band its fourth top-40 entry on the ranking. The album additionally debuted at number six in Germany, number four in Hungary, number 19 in Ireland, number 33 in Italy, and number one in Portugal—BTS' first Japanese-language entry on these charts.

=== Worldwide ===
In March 2021, the International Federation of the Phonographic Industry (IFPI) published its annual Global Album Sales chart for 2020. The chart combines physical sales and digital downloads worldwide to determine the 10 best-selling albums of a given year. Of four Japanese-language albums to make the chart, Map of the Soul: 7 – The Journey was the second highest ranked at number eight having sold 1.2 million copies worldwide, only behind Kenshi Yonezu's Stray Sheep at number three which sold 2 million copies. The album was BTS's third entry on the chart, behind Map of the Soul: 7 at number one and Be at number two.

== Track listing ==
All Japanese lyrics are written by KM-Markit.

Map of the Soul: 7 – The Journey – Regular edition
No.	Title	Writer(s)	Producer(s)	Length
1.	"Intro: Calling"	UTA; Sunny Boy; Melanie Fontana; Michel Schulz; KM-MARKIT; JUN	UTA	1:25
2.	"Stay Gold"	UTA; Sunny Boy; Fontana; Schulz; JUN; KM-MARKIT	UTA	4:03
3.	"Boy with Luv" (Japanese version)	Pdogg; RM; Fontana; Schulz; "hitman" bang; Suga; Emily Weisband; J-Hope	Pdogg	3:50
4.	"Make It Right" (Japanese version)	Fred Gibson; Ed Sheeran; Benjy Gibson; Jo Hill; RM; Suga; J-Hope	FRED	3:46
5.	"Dionysus" (Japanese version)	Pdogg; J-Hope; Supreme Boi; RM; Suga; Roman Campolo	Pdogg	4:09
6.	"Idol" (Japanese version)	Pdogg; Supreme Boi; "hitman" bang; Ali Tamposi; Campolo; RM	Pdogg	3:43
7.	"Airplane Pt. 2" (Japanese version)	Pdogg; RM; Tamposi; Liza Owen; Campolo; "hitman" bang; Suga; J-Hope	Pdogg	3:40
8.	"Fake Love" (Japanese version)	Pdogg; "hitman" bang; RM	Pdogg	4:04
9.	"Black Swan" (Japanese version)	Pdogg; RM; August Rigo; Vince Nantes; Clyde Kelly	Pdogg	3:19
10.	"On" (Japanese version)	Pdogg; RM; Rigo; Fontana; Schulz; Suga; J-Hope; Antonina Armato; Krysta Youngs; Julia Ross	Pdogg	4:08
11.	"Lights"	UTA; Yohei; Sunny Boy	UTA	4:53
12.	"Your Eyes Tell"	Gustav Mared; Jungkook; UTA; JUN	Mared; UTA	4:05
13.	"Outro: The Journey"	UTA; Gustav Mared; Jungkook; JUN	UTA	1:17
Total length:				46:22

Map of the Soul: 7 – The Journey – Limited editions A and C (Blu-ray/DVD)
No.	Title	Director(s)	Length
1.	"Stay Gold Music Video"	Ko Yoo Jeong	4:16
2.	"On Music Video"	Choi Yongseok (Lumpens)	5:52
3.	"Black Swan Music Video"	Choi Yongseok	3:38
4.	"Lights Music Video"	Doori Kwak (GDW)	5:27
5.	"Idol Music Video"	Choi Yongseok	3:52
6.	"Airplane Pt. 2 Music Video" (Japanese ver.)	Choi Yongseok	3:48
7.	"Fake Love Music Video"	Choi Yongseok	5:19
8.	"Stay Gold Making of Music Video"		20:11
9.	"Making of Jacket Photos"		21:20
Total length:			73:43

Notes:

- "Fake Love", "Idol" and "On" are stylized in all caps.

== Personnel ==
Excludes songwriting and production credits already listed above.

Musicians

- UTA – keyboards (Tracks 1, 2), synthesizer (Tracks 1, 2), guitar (Tracks 1, 2), record engineering (Tracks 1, 2), mix engineering, digital editing (Track 2),
- KM-MARKIT – rap arrangement (Tracks 2–8)
- Melanie Joy Fontana – chorus (Tracks 3, 10)
- Masaya Wada – vocal arrangement (Track 2)
- Pdogg – vocal arrangement (Tracks 2–10), record engineering (Tracks 2, 4, 7–10), keyboards (Tracks 3, 5–10), synthesizer (Tracks 3, 5–10), record engineering (Tracks 3, 5), gang vocals (Track 5)
- Jungkook – chorus (Tracks 2–10), gang vocals (Track 6)
- Yohei – chorus (Track 2)
- Lee Taewook – guitar (Track 3)
- "Hitman" Bang – keyboards (Track 7)
- J-Hope – chorus (Track 5, 9), gang vocals (Tracks 5, 6)
- RM – chorus (Track 5), gang vocals (Tracks 5, 6)
- Fred – drums (Track 4), keyboards (Track 4), synthesizer (Track 4), programming (Track 4)
- Supreme Boi – digital editing (Track 5), record engineering (Tracks 5, 6, 9, 10), gang vocals (Tracks 5, 6), chorus (Tracks 6, 8), rap arrangement (Tracks 9, 10)
- Phil X – guitar (Track 5)
- Lee Jooyoung – bass (Track 7)
- Adora – chorus (Track 7)
- Lee Taewook – guitar (Tracks 7, 8)
- Del Atkins – bass (Track 10)
- Amber Wright – choir (Track 10)
- Chadaé McAllister – choir (Track 10)
- Cherene Cexil – choir (Track 10)
- Dedrick Bonner – choir (Track 10), choir direction (Track 10)
- Kayla Collins – choir (Track 10)
- Kia Dawn Fulton – choir (Track 10)
- Moiro Konchellah – choir (Track 10)
- Samuel Pounds – choir (Track 10)
- Summer Greer – choir (Track 10)
- Tym Brown – choir (Track 10)
- Zakiya Young – choir (Track 10)
- Duane Benjamin – conductor (Track 10), music direction (Track 10)
- Kevin McKeown – direction
- Meloney Collins – choir direction (assistant) (Track 10)
- Paul Addleman – direction (assistant) (Track 10)
- Kenn Fischer – direction (associate) (Track 10)
- Bianca Arriaga – drums (Track 10)
- Young – guitar (Track 10)
- Brendan Kersey-Wilson – horns (Track 10)

Technical

- D.O.I. – mix engineering (Tracks 1, 2)
- Michel "Lindgren" Schulz – record engineering (Tracks 3, 10)
- Kim Jeeyeon – record engineering (Tracks 2, 4, 5)
- Park Eunjeong – record engineering (Track 2)
- DJ Riggins – mixing (Tracks 3, 5, 9, 10)
- Jacob Richards – mixing (Tracks 3, 5, 7, 9, 10)
- Mike Seaberg – mixing (Tracks 3, 5, 7, 9, 10)
- Jaycen Joshua – mix engineering (Tracks 3, 5, 7, 9, 10)
- Park Jinse – record engineering (Tracks 3, 6)
- El Capitxn – digital editing (Tracks 4, 5)
- Hiss noise – digital editing (Tracks 4–8, 10), gang vocals (Track 5)
- James F. Reynolds – mix engineering (Tracks 4, 6, 8)
- Kim Minsoo – digital editing (Track 6)
- Moon Soojeong – digital editing (Track 7)
- Rashawn McLean – mixing (Track 7)
- J.Pearl – digital editing (Track 8)
- Ghstloop – digital editing (Track 9)
- Erik Reichers – record engineering (Track 10)

== Accolades ==
Year	Ceremony	Category	Result	Ref.
2021	Japan Gold Disc Award	Album of the Year (Asia)	Won	
2021	Japan Gold Disc Award	Best 3 Album (Asia)	Won	

== Charts ==
=== Weekly charts ===
Weekly chart performance
Chart (2020–2021)	Peak position
Australian Albums (ARIA)	9
Austrian Albums (Ö3 Austria)	5
Belgian Albums (Ultratop Flanders)	23
Belgian Albums (Ultratop Wallonia)	18
Canadian Albums (Billboard)	90
Croatian International Albums (HDU)	14
Dutch Albums (Album Top 100)	51
French Albums (SNEP)	18
German Albums (Offizielle Top 100)	6
German Albums (Offizielle Top 20 HipHop)	3
Hungarian Albums (MAHASZ)	4
Irish Albums (Official Charts)	19
Italian Albums (FIMI)	33
Japanese Albums (Oricon)	1
Japanese Hot Albums (Billboard Japan)	1
New Zealand Albums (RMNZ)	7
Polish Albums (ZPAV)	15
Portuguese Albums (AFP)	1
Scottish Albums (Official Charts)	21
Spanish Albums (Promusicae)	11
Swiss Albums (Schweizer Hitparade)	7
UK Albums (Official Charts)	35
US Billboard 200	14
US World Albums (Billboard)	1

=== Year-end charts ===
Year-end chart performance
Chart (2020)	Position
Japan Hot Albums (Billboard Japan)	4
Japanese Albums (Oricon)	3
Portuguese Albums (AFP)	81
Chart (2021)	Position
Hungarian Albums (MAHASZ)	75
Japan Hot Albums (Billboard Japan)	58
Japanese Albums (Oricon)	74

== Certifications and sales ==
Certifications and sales
Region	Certification	Certified units/sales
Canada (Music Canada)	2× Platinum	160,000^{‡}
Japan (RIAJ)	Million	1,000,000^{^}
South Korea	—	184,881
United Kingdom (BPI)	Gold	100,000^{‡}
Summaries
Worldwide (IFPI)	—	1,170,000
^{^} Shipments figures based on certification alone.^{‡} Sales+streaming figures based on certification alone.

== Release history ==
Release dates and formats
Region	Date	Formats	Labels	Ref.
North America	July 14, 2020	Digital download; streaming	Def Jam; Virgin	
Various	July 14, 2020	Digital download; streaming	Def Jam; Virgin	
Japan	July 15, 2020	Digital download; streaming	Def Jam; Virgin	
Japan	July 15, 2020	CD	Def Jam; Virgin	
Hong Kong, Korea, Taiwan	July 15, 2020	CD	Def Jam; Virgin	
Australia, New Zealand	July 17, 2020	CD	Def Jam; Virgin	
North America	August 7, 2020	CD	Def Jam; Virgin	
Various	August 7, 2020	CD	Def Jam; Virgin	
