= Stay Gold (BTS song) =

2020 single by BTS

Single by BTS

from the album Map of the Soul: 7 – The Journey
- Language: Japanese
- Released: June 19, 2020
- Studio: Dogg Bounce; Big Hit; Orat
- Genre: Pop
- Length: 4:03
- Label: Virgin Music
- Songwriters: UTA; Sunny Boy; JUN; Michel Schulz; KM-MARKIT; Melanie Fontana
- Producer: UTA

BTS singles chronology
"On" (2020)	"Stay Gold" (2020)	"Dynamite" (2020)

BTS Japanese singles chronology
"Lights" / "Boy With Luv" (2019)	"Stay Gold" (2020)	"Film Out" (2021)

Music video
- "Stay Gold" on YouTube

"Stay Gold" is a song recorded by South Korean boy band BTS as the original soundtrack for the TV Tokyo drama series Spiral Labyrinth – DNA Forensic Investigation. It is also the lead single from the band's fourth Japanese studio album, Map of the Soul: 7 – The Journey (2020). The song was produced by long-time Japanese collaborator UTA, who co-wrote it with Sunny Boy, Melanie Fontana, Michel Schulz, JUN, and KM-MARKIT. It was digitally pre-released on June 19, 2020, as part of the lead up to the album's debut.

== Music and lyrics ==
"Stay Gold" is a "soothing, uplifting track" that blends "bouncy hip-hop beats on the verses and power-pop production on the choruses". Teen Vogue called it a "piano-pop number infused with enough cheer to make your cheeks burst...that picks up into a mid-tempo anthem of pure joy." AP's Cristina Jaleru, writing for the Chicago Sun-Times, described it as "an uplifting piano tune with a catchy hook". Musically, the song is composed in the key of C# Major at a tempo of 129 beats per minute with a runtime of 4:33, and features keyboard, guitar, and synthesizers in its instrumentation. It was written by UTA, who has worked with the band on other Japanese releases since 2015, Sunny Boy, Melanie Fontana, Michel Schulz, JUN, and KM-MARKIT—the first was also responsible for production. Backing vocals were provided by Jungkook and Yohei. UTA, Pdogg, Jee-yeon Kim, and Eun-jeong Park served as recording engineers. Recording was split between Dogg Bounce and BigHit Studio in South Korea, and Studio Orat in Japan. Mixing was handled by D.O.I. at Daimonion Recordings in Shibuya, Tokyo.

Thematically, "Stay Gold" conveys the message that "The world may not be full of good things, but please don't lose your luster", with its opening line "In a world where you feel cold, you gotta stay gold, baby" highlighting the song's underlying positive message. Vocalist Jungkook softly sings the song's first line, backed by isolated piano notes, before it changes pace and segues into rapper Suga's verse accompanied by "bouncing strings". The rappers of the group handle the verses while the choruses are shared amongst the vocalists. The song's lyrics are "full of sentimentality" and "read like a love letter" in parts, with rapper RM delivering lines that liken the eyes of the song's subject to "diamonds", calling them "beautiful more than any other jewel." The chorus is filled with chants of "stay gold" from the band to their unnamed loved one interspersed between "declarations of affection", with Sound Digest calling it a "great moment for fans to shout the words". Vocalist Jimin sings his "signature high note" during the song's final chorus, backed by "booming drums" and "soaring vocals" from his bandmates. Jimin and Jungkook share the final verse, trading lines as the song winds down to end on a softer note with a smooth harmonization.

== Background and release ==
On March 26, Billboard Japan reported that a new BTS song called "Stay Gold" had been selected as the theme for then upcoming Japanese television drama, Spiral Labyrinth–DNA Forensic Investigation (Rasen no Meikyū–DNA Kagaku Sōsa)—it would be the band's first Japanese drama theme song in two years since "Don't Leave Me" for Fuji TV's 2018 series Signal. Billboard described the track as a "bright song with expressive lyrics that anyone can easily relate to", and claimed it would be part of a new BTS album releasing in the summer. Originally slated to air on TV Tokyo in April, filming for the drama was halted due to the COVID-19 pandemic in Japan, and the song's release was delayed.

In May, Big Hit Entertainment officially announced that the release of BTS' fourth Japanese studio album was set for July—"Stay Gold" was included on the finalized track list as the lead single and would digitally precede the album's drop roughly one month in advance. The first teaser of the song was revealed on May 14 through a promotional music spot video for the album uploaded to Universal Music Japan's YouTube channel. The 15-second long clip included a brief snippet of the song's official music video at the end, in which BTS member Jungkook could be heard singing the words "stay gold" with "kimi sae ireba" as the responding refrain. The clip garnered over 880,000 views within a week of release. A second music spot video was uploaded on July 12.

The single was simultaneously released across various digital platforms worldwide on June 19. Yunika Vision ran a 30-minute long special feature of seven BTS music videos including "Stay Gold" on its screens in front of Seibu-Shinjuku Station from July 6–12; the feature was also accessible for mobile viewing with high-quality sound via the "VISION α" app. The complex later ran a Billboard Japan Hot 100 airplay feature of the music video from July 28–August 4, during which it was shown five times a day.

== Reception ==
K-pop journalist Jeff Benjamin, via Forbes, described "Stay Gold" as a "comforting pop blanket" with a "scaling, surging hook encouraging listeners to "stay gold"" that "deliver[s] empowering words at a time when many need it." Reviewing for Sound Digest, Amanda Thilo felt the song was "romantic" but also "uplifting", stating that "during times like this it's nice to have a reminder to stay positive for ourselves and our loved ones". Thilo also praised vocalist Jimin's "signature high note" for how it "kicks the song into an even higher gear", and complimented the harmonies between himself and fellow vocalist Jungkook, stating that their "voices meld together seamlessly". She further remarked, "With everything going on in the world, staying gold may just be what we need." Billboard's Glenn Rowley also called the song "romantic", quoting the lyrics of the chorus in reference to this, and the video "hopeful" and "sunny". E! Online's Samantha Schnurr described the video as "an uplifting visual featuring plenty of sunshine and an apropos representation of the track title." Noting possible inspiration from world events in light of the COVID-19 pandemic, India's Mumbai Mirror wrote, "...many are forced to stay indoors, separated from their loved ones. But just like the track's encouraging message, the seven artistes see the light at the end of the tunnel...the seven walk out into spring, a stark contrast from where they were initially put." Consequence of Sound called the video "beautifully uplifting", stating that "while it might be easy to feel overwhelmed given the current state of affairs, BTS are adamant about remaining hopeful...that's the advice they pass along to their fans in "Stay Gold"." Echoing similar sentiments, ET Canada felt the video "brightens up the world, bringing light and colour to the darkness...when they [BTS] hit the chorus, things suddenly get bright and summery." Writing for Billboard post-album release, Gil Kaufman stated, "BTS know all about summer lovin'. And with..."Stay Gold", they're having a blast." He described the song as "another ear-worm classic" and said "BTS will melt your hearts".

=== Commercial performance ===
In Japan, "Stay Gold" entered the Billboard Japan Hot 100 at number 18. It rose six places the following day and peaked at number 12. On Oricon, the song debuted at number two on the Daily Digital Single chart (Note: Oricon's Daily Digital Single chart ranks the ten best-selling digital songs of each day. The Weekly Digital Single chart ranks the twenty best-selling digital songs of the week.) where it remained for two consecutive days. With only three days of tracking, as it was released just before the end of the charting week, the song entered the Weekly Digital Single chart for the period June 15–21 at number six with 10,880 sales. It also landed on the Total Weekly Single chart (Note: Oricon's Total Weekly Single chart aggregates physical sales, streaming, and digital downloads. "Stay Gold"'s entry was supported by streams and downloads only as it had no physical release.) at number 17. It continued to chart on the daily digital ranking, rising to number six on its fourth day and staying there for two consecutive days before leaving the top ten. The song sold a further 6,824 copies for the period June 22–28 to rank at number 10 on the weekly digital chart. It left the top 20 the following week, but achieved a new peak on the aggregate chart for the same period at number 12, and continued to rank there for five successive weeks. Upon the album's release, the song made a brief return to the daily digital chart dated July 14 at number six, and the weekly digital chart for the period July 13–19 at number 15, selling an additional 6,947 copies. According to Billboard Japan, "Stay Gold" was the 46th most-streamed song of 2020 in the country. It ranked at number 56 on the Japan Hot 100 Year End chart, the second-highest entry of four BTS songs to make it on the hundred-song ranking, behind only "Dynamite" at number 18. In March 2021, "Stay Gold" became BTS' first Japanese song—second song overall after "Dynamite"—to surpass 100 million on-demand streams in Japan. BTS is the first foreign artist in the chart's history to have two songs achieve this.

In the United States, "Stay Gold" debuted at number one on the World Digital Song Sales chart. This marked the band's 20th number-one entry on the World chart and their 89th top-10 ranking overall. The track was the sixth best-selling digital song of the week in the US with just over 10,000 sales, garnering the band its 16th top-10 entry on Billboard's all-genre Digital Song Sales chart. It is the highest charting Japanese song by a Korean artist on the chart. The song also landed on Billboard's Bubbling Under Hot 100 chart at number nine. It did not enter South Korea's Gaon Digital Chart, but peaked at number 52 on the component Download Chart.

Globally, "Stay Gold" became the first Japanese single in history to top iTunes charts in 82 countries within 24 hours of release, including the US, the United Kingdom, Japan, France, Brazil, and India. It surpassed previous record holder, the band's 2019 single "Lights", which charted at number one in 43 territories. The record was subsequently broken in July, by album-mate "Your Eyes Tell", which topped iTunes charts in 92 territories in its first 24 hours.

== Music video ==
The song's official music video, directed by Yoo-jung Ko of Lumpens, was posted to Big Hit's YouTube channel on June 26, 2020. It opens with member Jungkook in a dark room, gazing beyond the dilapidated spot. In the scenes that follow, the other band members are shown wandering various dark and decrepit locations, separated from one another. They collectively dream about reuniting on a sunshine-filled day and enjoying little things together. During each chorus, the video switches to lighter settings, showing the members playing Jenga, reading a book, or petting a dog. They enjoy the warm atmosphere while basking in gold light and confetti. Eventually, they see rays of light in the dark surroundings which help them escape and reunite with each other. As the video draws to a close, they successfully seek paradise together, and discover "a brighter world filled with purple flowers and lush nature".

The music video amassed more than 5 million views within four hours of its premiere, and became BTS' fastest Japanese music video to surpass 50 million views, doing so in five days. It became the band's milestone twenty-fifth music video to reach 100 million views when it crossed the mark on August 21, 2020.

== Live performances ==
BTS appeared on TBS Japan's CDTV Live! Live! on June 22 for the premiere performance of "Stay Gold" via pre-recorded video. Wearing blue-toned outfits by Dior, the band gave a sit-down performance of the song against an all-white minimalist set that featured a large, flowering tree in the background, reminiscent of the tree from the music video. The performance's visuals and the band's vocals were well received, particularly Jungkook's rendition of the song's intro, Jimin's high notes, and V's baritone, with BTS, individual member names, the song's title, and CDTV-related terms trending in real-time on Yahoo Japan, Google Japan, Twitter, and Twipple (Note: Twipple is the Japanese version of Twitter. Trending topics on the site are usually Japan-based. Both platforms can be synced so that information shared on Twipple will also appear on Twitter and vice versa.) searches and celebrity rankings both during and after the broadcast. The band gave further performances on NTV's Sukkiri on July 14, Buzz Rhythm 02 on July 17, and NHK TV's SONGS on July 18—this was BTS' first appearance on SONGS in two years and they additionally performed "Black Swan". On August 26, the band performed the song together with the Korean version of "Mic Drop" for Fuji TV's 2020 FNS Music Festival Summer, their second time on the show following their December 2019 performance of "Fake Love" (2018).

== Credits and personnel ==
Credits adapted from the liner notes of Map of the Soul: 7 – The Journey, Melon, and Tidal.

- BTS – primary vocals
- UTA – production, songwriting, keyboard, synthesizer, guitar, digital editing, record engineering, studio personnel
- SUNNY BOY – songwriting
- Melanie Joy Fontana – songwriting
- Michel "Lindgren" Schulz – songwriting
- JUN – songwriting
- KM-MARKIT – songwriting, rap arrangement
- Jungkook – chorus
- Yohei – chorus
- Pdogg – vocal arrangement, record engineering, studio personnel
- Masaya Wada – vocal arrangement
- Jee-yeon Kim – record engineering, studio personnel
- Eun-jeong Park – record engineering
- D.O.I. – mix engineering, studio personnel

== Charts ==
=== Weekly charts ===
Weekly chart performance
Chart (2020)	Peak position
Euro Digital Song Sales (Billboard)	10
Hungary (Single Top 40)	3
Japan (Japan Hot 100)	12
Japan Combined Singles (Oricon)	12
Malaysia (RIM)	3
South Korea Download (Gaon)	52
US Bubbling Under Hot 100 (Billboard)	9
US Digital Songs (Billboard)	6
US World Digital Song Sales (Billboard)	1

=== Year-end charts ===
Year-end chart performance
Chart	Year	Position
Japan (Japan Hot 100)	2020	56
Japan (Japan Hot 100)	2021	66

== Certifications and sales ==
Certifications and sales
Region	Certification	Certified units/sales
Brazil (Pro-Música Brasil)	Platinum	40,000^{‡}
Japan (RIAJ)	Gold	100,000^{*}
United States	—	10,000
Streaming
Japan (RIAJ)	2× Platinum	200,000,000^{†}
^{*} Sales figures based on certification alone.^{‡} Sales+streaming figures based on certification alone.^{†} Streaming-only figures based on certification alone.

== Release history ==
Release history and formats for "Stay Gold"
Region	Date	Format(s)	Label	Ref.
Various	June 19, 2020	Digital download; streaming	Virgin Music	
Italy	August 8, 2020	Contemporary hit radio	Universal	
