= Film Out =

2021 BTS single

Single by BTS

from the album BTS, the Best
- Language: Japanese
- Released: April 2, 2021
- Length: 3:34 (single version); 3:36 (album version)
- Label: Universal; Virgin Music
- Songwriters: Iyori Shimizu; Jungkook; UTA
- Producers: Back Number; UTA

BTS singles chronology
"Life Goes On" (2020)	"Film Out" (2021)	"Butter" (2021)

BTS Japanese singles chronology
"Stay Gold" (2020)	"Film Out" (2021)

Music video
- "Film Out" on YouTube

"Film Out" is a song recorded by South Korean boy band BTS. It was released on April 2, 2021, by Virgin Music and Universal Music Japan. The song was used as the ending theme for Signal the Movie Cold Case Investigation Unit (2021), and was later included on their second Japanese-language compilation album, BTS, the Best (2021).

== Background and release ==
"Film Out" was announced by BTS on February 16, 2021, as the ending theme for Signal the Movie Cold Case Investigation Unit. The song was written by BTS member Jungkook in collaboration with the lead vocalist of Japanese rock power trio Back Number, Iyori Shimizu, and the track's producer UTA. A ballad number, "Film Out" was eventually revealed as the opening track on BTS' then upcoming Japanese-language compilation album, BTS, the Best; the album was released in June. The song was released for digital download and streaming in various countries on April 2, through Universal Music Japan.

== Commercial performance ==
"Film Out" debuted at number one on Oricon's Daily Digital Singles chart dated April 2, 2021 with 23,344 downloads. With only three days of availability, the song also topped the Weekly Digital Singles chart for the tracking period dated March 29–April 4 with 32,947 cumulative downloads. "Film Out" debuted at number two on the Japan Hot 100, on the chart issue dated April 7, and topped the corresponding issues for the component Download and Streaming Songs charts. Following the release of BTS, the Best in June, the song re-entered Oricon's weekly Digital chart at number 20 with an additional 5,002 downloads sold for the period June 14–20.

In the United States, with only one day of availability for the tracking week ending April 2, "Film Out" debuted at number 185 on the Billboard Global Excl. U.S. chart issue dated April 10, with 2,400 downloads sold and an accumulated 15 million streams. It was one of four BTS songs in the top-10 that week, marking the second time the group charted songs in three languages (Japanese, English, and Korean) within the same period. No other artist has achieved this since the chart's inception. The following week, with its first full period of tracking from April 2–8, "Film Out" debuted on the Billboard Global 200 at number five, with 47.2 million streams and 66,000 sales, becoming BTS' fifth top-10 entry on the chart—the most among all groups since the ranking was launched. It is the first Japanese song to chart in the top five, and the second in the top 10 after LiSA's "Homura" which charted at number eight in October. The song moved up 182 spots on the Global Excl. U.S. chart to number three, with 44.3 million streams and second-week sales of 47,000 copies, marking the greatest jump on the chart by any song—the record was previously held by IU's "Celebrity" which moved up 146 spots from number 190 to 44 in February. "Film Out" became the group's first Japanese-language song to chart on the Billboard Hot 100, at number 81, and its 20th entry on the ranking overall. With 19,000 copies sold, the song was the best-selling release of the week and topped the Digital Songs chart. This marked BTS' first Japanese-language number-one on the sales chart, sixth number-one overall, and 24th top-10 entry.

== Music video ==
The music video for the song, directed by Yong Seok Choi of Lumpens, was released to Big Hit's YouTube channel at midnight KST on April 2, 2021. It was preceded by a trailer uploaded to the same platform on March 25. The video opens to show the band inside a white-themed house, suspended in the sky. In it, the members reflect on memories that they shared with one another. Jin notices an hour-glass counting down the time they have spent together. The hour-glass appears several times throughout the clip and leads up to a "dramatic" explosion that leaves the house in complete chaos.

== Credits and personnel ==
Adapted from Tidal.

- BTS – vocals
- UTA – producer, songwriter, keyboards, synthesizer, sound editor, studio personnel
- Back Number – producer
- Iyori Shimizu – songwriter, electric guitar
- Jungkook – songwriter
- Masato Ishinari – acoustic guitar
- Masami Horisawa – cello
- Yuki Mizuno – cello
- Akira Murata – piano
- Shoko Mabuchi – viola
- Tomoko Shimaoka – viola
- Ayaka Notomi – violin
- Eaisung Shin – violin
- Hanako Uesato – violin
- Koichiro Muroya – violin
- Rina Odera – violin
- Shoko Oki – violin
- Tomomi Tokunaga – violin
- Yuya Yanagihara – violin
- Keita Joko – sound editor, studio personnel
- Pdogg – recording engineer, studio personnel
- Toshihiro Watanabe – recording engineer, studio personnel
- D.O.I. – mix engineer, studio personnel

== Charts ==
=== Weekly charts ===
Weekly chart performance
Chart (2021)	Peak position
Canada Hot 100 (Billboard)	79
Global 200 (Billboard)	5
Hungary (Single Top 40)	4
Ireland (IRMA)	92
Japan Hot 100 (Billboard)	2
Japan Combined Singles (Oricon)	2
Lithuania (AGATA)	87
New Zealand Hot Singles (RMNZ)	5
Portugal (AFP)	111
Singapore (RIAS)	7
South Korea Download (Gaon)	30
UK Singles (Official Charts)	73
US Billboard Hot 100	81
US World Digital Song Sales (Billboard)	1

=== Year-end charts ===
Year-end chart performance
Chart (2021)	Position
Japan (Japan Hot 100)	54

== Certifications ==
Certifications
Region	Certification	Certified units/sales
Brazil (Pro-Música Brasil)	Platinum	40,000^{‡}
Streaming
Japan (RIAJ)	Platinum	100,000,000^{†}
^{‡} Sales+streaming figures based on certification alone.^{†} Streaming-only figures based on certification alone.

== Release history ==
Release dates and formats
Region	Date	Format(s)	Label	Ref.
Various	April 2, 2021	Digital download; streaming	Virgin Music; Universal Music	
