= Lights (BTS song) =

2019 single by BTS

- Digital and regular edition cover

Single by BTS
- A-side: "Boy with Luv (Japanese version)"
- B-side: "Idol"
- Released: July 3, 2019
- Genre: Electropop
- Length: 4:52
- Label: Universal; Def Jam
- Songwriters: Sunny Boy; UTA; Yohei
- Producer: UTA

BTS singles chronology
"Heartbeat" (2019)	"Lights" (2019)	"Make It Right" (2019)

BTS Japanese singles chronology
"Fake Love" / "Airplane Pt. 2" (2018)	"Lights" / "Boy with Luv" (2019)	"Stay Gold" (2020)

Music video
- "Lights" on YouTube

"Lights" is a song recorded by South Korean boy band BTS. It song was released as a double A-side single with the Japanese version of "Boy with Luv" on July 3, 2019, through Universal Music Japan, and was later included in their fourth Japanese-language studio album, Map of the Soul: 7 ~ The Journey ~ (2020). This marked the band's first original Japanese single in two years since 2017's "Crystal Snow". The song was written by Sunny Boy, Yohei, and UTA, with the latter of the three solely handling production. Musically, it is an electropop power ballad in the style of dance music, featuring a bassline and piano-driven chord progression. An uplifting song, the lyrics describe BTS and the listener as each other's light.

Upon release, the song received generally favourable reviews from music critics, who praised its lyrical content and the band's vocal performance. "Lights" was a commercial success in Japan, debuting at number one on the Oricon Singles Chart, selling 637,000 physical copies in its first week. The song also peaked at the summit of both the Billboard Japan Hot 100 and US World Digital Song Sales chart. It was the sixth best-selling single of 2019 in Japan and received a million certification from the Recording Industry Association of Japan (RIAJ) only a month after its release, making BTS the first male foreign artist to achieve this. The single album was later awarded as one of the top five singles of the year at the 2020 Japan Gold Disc Awards.

An accompanying music video was uploaded to YouTube on July 2, 2019, and depicts the band interacting with each other inside a movie theatre. The song was BTS' first Japanese single in four years to receive the music video treatment since "For You" (2015). The band performed "Lights" live as a part of their fifth Japanese fan-meeting concerts in Chiba and Osaka in 2019.

== Background and composition ==
Following the release of the band's sixth extended play Map of the Soul: Persona in April 2019, BTS announced that their tenth Japanese-language single "Lights" would be released alongside the Japanese versions of the band's previously released Korean-language singles "Idol" (2018) and "Boy with Luv" (2019). The record marked BTS's first original Japanese single in two years since "Crystal Snow" (2017). It was also the band's first Japanese single in four years to receive a music video, after "For You" (2015). "Lights" was written by Sunny Boy, Yohei and its producer UTA. The song was mixed by D.O.I, who also served as studio personnel.

"Lights" is an electropop power ballad in the style of dance music, that features a heavy bassline and "clear" piano-driven chord progression in its composition. The track is further instrumented by guitar and synthesizer. In terms of musical notation, the song is composed in the key of F major with a tempo of 99 beats per minute, and is four minutes and 52 seconds long. Lyrically, the track is "uplifting" and deals with themes of love and self-acceptance. In "Lights", BTS refer to themselves and the listener as each other's light, and sing about motivating each other to face hardships in a positive way.

== Release and reception ==
"Lights" was made available for digital download and streaming as a single in various countries on July 3, 2019, by Universal Music Japan, as the first single from BTS' fourth Japanese-language studio album, Map of the Soul: 7 ~ The Journey ~. The song was released as a CD single in Japan on July 5, 2019, through the aforementioned record label, in three different limited editions; A, B and C. All three editions contain "Lights" and "Boy with Luv" as a double A-side, and a B-side track "Idol". In addition, edition A of the single includes a DVD containing the music videos for "Lights" and "Idol". Edition B also comes with a DVD that contains behind the scenes footage of the music video for "Lights" and the making of album jacket photos, while C contains a 36-page photobook.

"Lights" was met with generally favourable reviews from music critics. Tamar Herman from Billboard complimented BTS' "sweet vocals and evocative raps" while also praising the song's lyrical content, writing that the "inspiring" song has the ability to "brighten up anyone’s day." Writing for Teen Vogue, Sara Delgado shared a similar view, deeming the band's vocal delivery as "awe-inspiring." In his review for Idolator, Mike Nied regarded the song as a "soaring anthem" which he felt complemented the "soft and dreamy" accompanying visuals. Chloe Gilke of Uproxx listed the track as one of the best pop songs of its release week and appreciated the transition from "rap verses to the soaring vocals" in the song's chorus, calling it "genuinely thrilling." At the 2020 Japan Gold Disc Awards, the single album "Lights / Boy with Luv" received the Best 5 Singles award, while the song "Lights" was awarded the Song of the Year by Download (Asia).

== Commercial performance ==
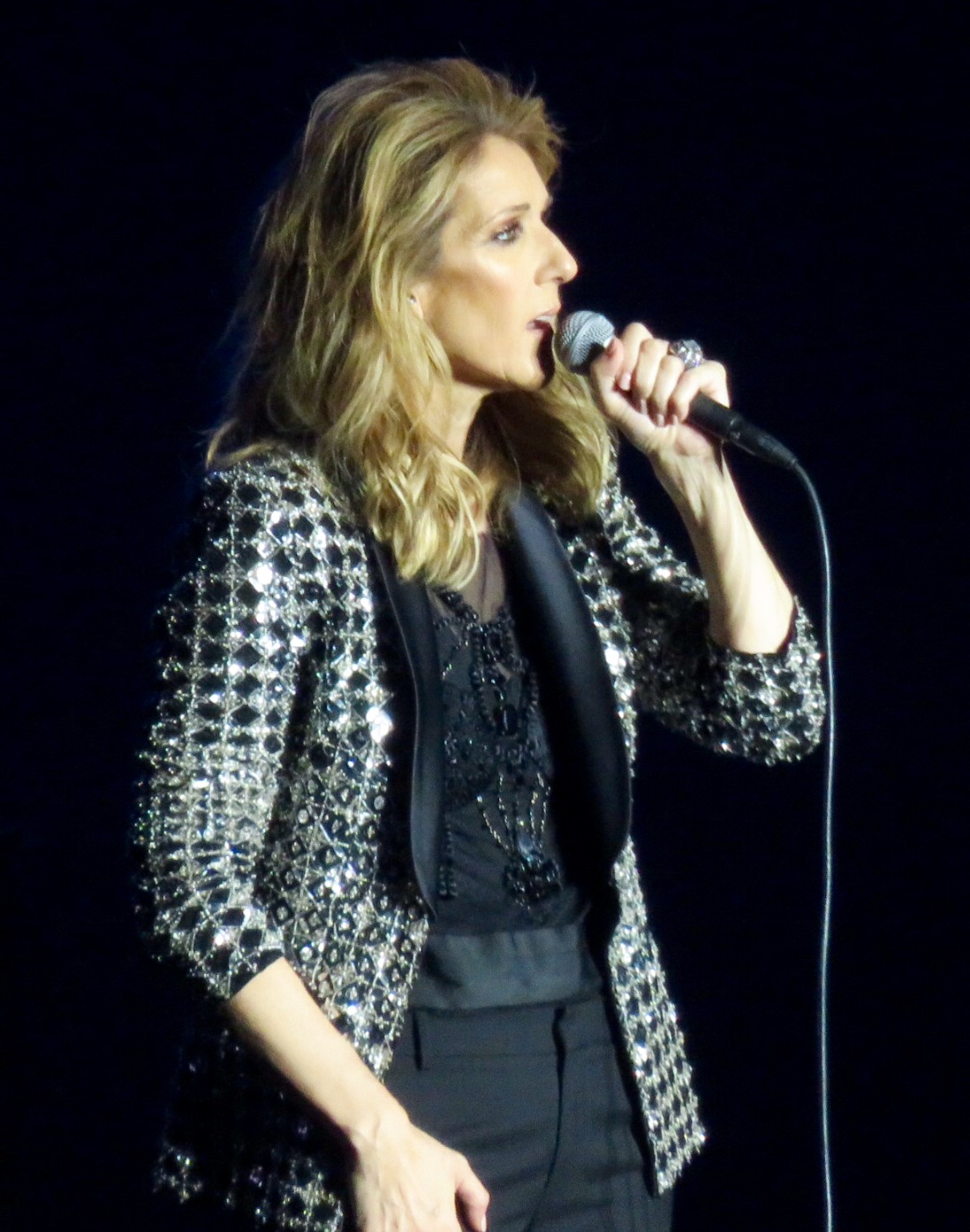
"Lights" surpassed one million pre-orders in Japan and broke the 24-year-old record of Celine Dion's 1995 single "To Love You More".

"Lights" was a commercial success in Japan. The single topped the Oricon Daily Singles Chart on its first day of release, selling 467,107 copies. By doing so, BTS achieved the highest sales in a single day by a foreign artist in the country, surpassing the record set by their previous Japanese single album, "Fake Love / Airplane Pt. 2", of 327,342 copies. The band also recorded the highest sales figures in a week, surpassing another self record of 454,829 copies. During the tracking period of July 1–3, 2019, the single recorded 636,345 copies sold, achieving higher sales than "Fake Love / Airplane Pt. 2" by over 100,000 units. On July 3, 2019, pre-orders for the single crossed 1,000,000 copies, marking the first time a Korean artist achieved a million shipments for a single in Japan, and breaking a 24-year-old record previously held solely by Celine Dion, with her 1995 single "To Love You More". The single remained at number one on the daily chart for seven consecutive days, selling 637,000 physical copies in its first week. "Lights" peaked at number one on the Oricon Weekly Singles Chart for the chart issue dated July 1–7, 2019, and became the best-selling physical single of July 2019 in Japan, selling 769,454 copies. For the year end chart, it was the sixth best-selling single in the country.

"Lights" debuted at number 81 on the Billboard Japan Hot 100 for the chart issue date of July 8, 2019. The following week, it rose up 80 places to number one on the chart. The single remained in the top five of the chart at number two, on the issue date of July 22, 2019. On August 8, 2019, "Lights" received a million certification from the Recording Industry Association of Japan (RIAJ), denoting shipments of 1,000,000 copies, making BTS the first male foreign artist to achieve this. The band also became the first male act in 11 years to earn a million award in the country since Masafumi Akikawa's 2007 single, "A Thousand Winds"; it was the first time the band attained the certification since their debut. "Lights" debuted at number one on the US World Digital Songs chart on the issue date of July 20, 2019, becoming the band's 14th number one on the chart. Elsewhere, the song entered the record charts in Scotland at number 73 on the Scottish Singles Chart, and appeared at number 10 on the New Zealand Hot Singles chart, an extension to the New Zealand Top 40 chart.

== Music video and promotion ==
The music video for "Lights" was uploaded to Universal Music Japan's official YouTube channel on July 2, 2019; it was preceded by a teaser released via the same platform on June 20. The visual is almost five-minutes long and opens in an empty movie theatre, where the opening title credits of a film titled "Lights" begin rolling on screen. In the following scene, Jungkook enters the theatre and sits down to watch the film. The video then cuts to show the other six members around the venue, engaged in different "mundane" activities. The visual is interspersed with scenes that show the band heading to an ATM, buying popcorn, discovering secret passageways, and running through a car park. In some of the scenes, the members are seen staring directly into the camera. Throughout the video, the band continue to watch the film, which features themselves, on screen. The visual explores the "concept of time and space," with scenes in which time has frozen and objects are seen floating around the cinema. As the clip progresses, the members are drawn towards each other while they interact and share effusive moments together. At one point, the projector beam scatters into tiny particles of light that turn into glowing orbs reminiscent of stars. Suga appears amongst them in the car park, rapping while the particles float around him. The rest of the band gaze up at the glowing lights from below while lying on a basketball court. The clip ends with the song's title displayed against the backdrop of light emanating from the movie projector. In her review for CelebMix, Ellie Nicholas called the music video "simplistic yet so beautiful" that it "matches the tone of the song perfectly." Lake Schatz of Consequence of Sound regarded the visual as "magical" and "dreamlike." Puah Ziwei from NME echoed similar sentiments, labeling the clip as "stunning" and "dreamy."

BTS performed "Lights" live for the first time on day one of their fifth Japanese fan-meeting concert event, BTS 5th Muster: Magic Shop, held at the Zozo Marine Stadium in Chiba, Japan on November 23 and 24, 2019. The song was also performed on the final two days of the event (December 14 and 15) at the Kyocera Dome in Osaka.

== Award & Nominations ==
Award and Nomination for "Lights"
Award Show	Year	Category	Result	Ref.
Japan Gold Disc Award	2020	Song of the Year by Download (Asia)	Won	
Japan Gold Disc Award	2020	Best 5 Singles	Won	

== Track listings ==
CD and digital download
No.	Title	Lyrics	Music	Length
1.	"Lights"	Sunny Boy; UTA; Yohei	UTA	4:53
2.	"Boy with Luv"	Pdogg; RM; Michel "Lindgren" Schulz; "Hitman" Bang; Suga; Emily Weisband; J-Hope; Ashley Frangipane	Pdogg	3:51
3.	"Idol"	"Hitman" Bang; Roman Campolo; Pdogg; RM; Supreme Boi; Ali Tamposi	Pdogg	3:42
Total length:				12:26

Limited Edition A (CD + DVD)
No.	Title	Length
1.	"Lights"	4:53
2.	"Boy with Luv"	3:51
3.	"Idol"	3:42
4.	"Lights" (music video)
5.	"Idol" (music video)

Limited Edition B (CD + DVD)
No.	Title	Length
1.	"Lights"	4:53
2.	"Boy with Luv"	3:51
3.	"Idol"	3:42
4.	"Lights" (making of music video)
5.	"Lights" (making of jacket photos)

Limited Edition C (CD + Booklet)
No.	Title	Length
1.	"Lights"	4:53
2.	"Boy with Luv"	3:51
3.	"Idol"	3:42

== Credits and personnel ==
Credits are adapted from Tidal.

- BTS – primary vocals
- UTA – producer, songwriter, guitar, keyboards, digital editing, synthesizer, studio personnel
- D.O.I. – mixing engineer, studio personnel
- Sunny Boy – songwriter
- Yohei – songwriter
- Jungkook – backing vocals
- Jimin – backing vocals
- Pdogg – recording engineer, vocal arrangement, studio personnel
- Jung Woo Young – recording engineer, studio personnel
- Park Jin Se – recording engineer, studio personnel
- KM-Markit – vocal arrangement
- Masaya Wada – vocal arrangement

== Charts ==
=== Weekly charts ===
Weekly chart performance
Chart (2019)	Peak position
Croatian International Albums (HDU) with "Boy with Luv"	3
Hungary (Single Top 40)	18
Japan (Japan Hot 100)	1
Japan (Oricon) with "Boy with Luv"	1
New Zealand Hot Singles (RMNZ)	10
Scottish Singles Sales (Official Charts) "Lights"	73
UK Singles Downloads (Official Charts)	80
US Digital Song Sales (Billboard)	48

=== Year-end charts ===
Year-end chart performance
Chart (2019)	Position
Japan (Oricon) with "Boy with Luv"	6
Japan (Japan Hot 100)	18

== Certifications ==
Certifications and sales
Region	Certification	Certified units/sales
Brazil (Pro-Música Brasil)	Platinum	40,000^{‡}
Japan (RIAJ)	Million	1,000,000^{^}
Poland (ZPAV)	2× Diamond	500,000^{‡}
South Korea	—	4,333
Streaming
Japan (RIAJ)	Platinum	100,000,000^{†}
^{^} Shipments figures based on certification alone.^{‡} Sales+streaming figures based on certification alone.^{†} Streaming-only figures based on certification alone.

== Release history ==
Release dates and formats
Country	Date	Format(s)	Edition	Label	Ref.
Various	July 3, 2019	Digital download; streaming	Regular Edition	Universal	
Japan	July 5, 2019	CD single	Regular Edition	Universal	
Japan	July 5, 2019	CD + DVD	Limited Edition A	Universal	
Japan	July 5, 2019	CD + DVD	Limited Edition B	Universal	
Japan	July 5, 2019	CD + Booklet	Limited Edition C	Universal	

== See also ==
- List of Hot 100 number-one singles of 2019 (Japan)
- List of Oricon number-one singles of 2019
