= Airplane Pt. 2 =

2018 song by BTS

- Japanese single cover

Single by BTS

from the album Love Yourself: Tear
- Released: November 7, 2018
- Genre: K-pop
- Length: 3:38
- Label: Big Hit; Def Jam
- Songwriters: Pdogg; RM; Ali Tamposi; Liza Owens; Roman Campolo; "hitman" bang; SUGA; J-Hope
- Producer: Pdogg

BTS singles chronology
"Waste It on Me" (2018)	"Airplane Pt. 2" (2018)	"Boy With Luv" (2019)

Music video
- "Airplane pt.2" on YouTube

BTS Japanese singles chronology
"Don't Leave Me" (2018)	"Fake Love" / "Airplane Pt. 2" (2018)	"Lights" / "Boy With Luv" (2019)

"Airplane Pt. 2" is a song recorded by South Korean boy group BTS from their sixth studio album Love Yourself: Tear (2018). On November 7, 2018, the Japanese version of the song was released through Def Jam as their ninth Japanese single.

== Background and release ==
It was confirmed by Big Hit Entertainment once the tracklist for Love Yourself: Tear was released that "Airplane Pt. 2" is a follow-up to the song "Airplane" which was off J-Hope's mixtape Hope World. In a behind the scene's album review member RM who's the songwriter said that when CEO Bang Si-hyuk first heard J-Hope's song it sounded like a BTS song, inspiring them to write a part two.

== Composition ==
"Airplane Pt. 2" is in the key of C minor. It is 140 beats per minute and 3:30 minutes long. It is a Latin-pop inspired song with lyrics that talks about how far they've come, from wishing to succeed to being able to travel around the world singing their music.

== Promotion ==
BTS promoted the Korean version of the song on various music programs in South Korea including Music Bank, Show! Music Core, Inkigayo, and M Countdown. The Korean version was also promoted live on The Ellen DeGeneres Show on May 25, although it was only released online.

On December 1, 2018, BTS performed the song at the 2018 Melon Music Awards in Seoul and in the same month they performed it at the 2018 Mnet Asian Music Awards in Hong Kong.

== Reception ==
Overall, the reception for the song was positive. Per Pearl Shin at thirdcoastreview, "Airplane Pt. 2" has an addictive hook that is perfect for the summer months. The popular Korean album reviewer IZM called it trendy and full of Latin rhythm while Elias Leight of Rolling Stone said "Airplane Pt. 2" rejuvenated the swanky strut of 50 Cent's "P.I.M.P.".

In the review for Pitchfork, Sheldon Pearce claimed that the song "reads like an analog for being a pop-star". MTV's Crystal Bell echoed these sentiments additionally characterizing the song as "catchy and current, a dreamy analog for the pop-star life" and praising "But to watch BTS perform the song live is to watch seven idols in full command of their artistry, where every subtle movement is part of a larger story".

Writing for The Guardian Alexis Petridis was a bit ambiguous about his review stating it sounded like a regular British pop song, with all the good and bad that entailed.

Upon release the Korean version of the song sold more than 10,000 copies in the United States.

== Accolades ==
Year-end lists
Critic/Publication	List	Rank	Ref.
Spotify	Best of 2018: K-Pop	21	

== Credits and personnel ==
=== Korean version ===
The original credits are adapted from the CD liner notes of Love Yourself: Tear.

- Pdogg – producer, keyboard, synthesizer, vocal and rap arrangement, digital editing, recording engineer
- RM – producer
- Ali Tamposi – producer
- Liza Owen – producer
- Roman Campolo – producer
- "hitman" bang – producer, keyboard
- Suga – producer
- J-Hope – producer
- Jungkook – chorus
- ADORA – chorus, recording engineer
- Lee Taewook – guitar
- Lee Jooyeong – bass
- Slow Rabbit – vocal arrangement, recording engineer
- Supreme Boi – rap arrangement, recording engineer
- Hiss noise – digital editing
- Jaycen Joshua – mix engineer

== Charts ==
=== Korean version ===
Chart (2018)	Peak position
France Download (SNEP)	111
Hungary (Single Top 40)	18
Japan Hot 100 (Billboard)	25
Malaysia (RIM)	7
South Korea Hot 100 (Billboard)	8
South Korea (Gaon)	37
UK Independent Singles (Official Charts Company)	40
US World Digital Song Sales (Billboard)	4

=== Japanese version ===
Chart (2018)	Peak position
Japan (Japan Hot 100)	25

== Certifications and sales ==
Sales and certifications for "Airplane Pt. 2"
Region	Certification	Certified units/sales
Brazil (Pro-Música Brasil)	Gold	20,000^{‡}
New Zealand (RMNZ)	Gold	15,000^{‡}
^{‡} Sales+streaming figures based on certification alone.
