= Boy with Luv =

2019 single by BTS featuring Halsey

- Japanese double A-side single cover (limited edition type A)

Single by BTS featuring Halsey

from the EP Map of the Soul: Persona
- A-side: "Lights"
- B-side: "Idol (Japanese version)"
- Released: April 12, 2019
- Genre: K-pop; funk; pop; nu-disco; bubblegum pop; disco-pop; electropop
- Length: 3:50
- Label: Big Hit (KR): Universal Japan (JP)
- Songwriters: Pdogg; RM; Melanie Joy Fontana; Michel "Lindgren" Schulz; "Hitman" Bang; Suga; Emily Weisband; J-Hope; Ashley Frangipane
- Producer: Pdogg

BTS singles chronology
"Waste It on Me" (2018)	"Boy with Luv" (2019)	"Dream Glow" (2019)

BTS Japanese singles chronology
"Fake Love" / "Airplane Pt. 2" (2018)	"Lights" / "Boy with Luv" (2019)	"Stay Gold" (2020)

Halsey singles chronology
"11 Minutes" (2019)	"Boy with Luv" (2019)	"Nightmare" (2019)

Music video
- "Boy with Luv" on YouTube "Boy with Luv" (ARMY with Luv version) on YouTube

Audio sample
- file; help

"Boy with Luv" (Korean: 작은 것들을 위한 시; RR: Jageun geotdeureul wihan si; lit. 'A Poem for Small Things') is a song recorded by South Korean boy band BTS, featuring American singer Halsey, as the lead single for their sixth extended play Map of the Soul: Persona. It was released on April 12, 2019, by Big Hit Entertainment. The song's music video was the most viewed online music video in 24 hours at the time, garnering over 74.6 million views within its first day of release. The song was certified Platinum by the RIAA in June. "Boy with Luv" held the record for the song with the most music show wins after the 2000s in South Korea with 21 wins, until the record was broken by "Dynamite".

The Japanese version of the song was released on July 3, 2019, on the double A-side single "Lights", via Universal Music Japan.

== Composition ==
"Boy With Luv" featuring American singer Halsey has been described as a "funk pop" song about happiness and love. It is performed in the key of D major with the vocals ranging from F♯_{4} to B_{5}. It serves as a parallel track to their earlier song "Boy in Luv", released in 2014. According to Tamar Herman of Billboard, the song describes how true strength and love come from finding joy in the smallest things in life. Elias Leight from Rolling Stone classified the song as "nu-disco single". NME characterized it as "bubblegum pop". Yim Hyun-su from The Korea Herald described the lead single as "an upbeat electro-pop song with catchy hooks". According to Refinery29, the light, funk-laced song features live instruments.

== Music video ==
A trailer for the music video was released on April 7, 2019, with a 13-second clip of the song towards the end. The teaser features Halsey working in a ticket booth before walking outside to find BTS sitting on a couch. A second teaser, featuring close-ups of the band, was released on April 10.

Directed by Yong-Seok Choi from Lumpens, the full music video was released on April 12. It simultaneously obtained the records of fastest-liked video and fastest-viewed video on YouTube, reaching 3 million likes in 2 hours and 74.6 million views within 24 hours of release, making it the most viewed YouTube video in the first 24 hours after its release at the time, averaging about 860 views per second during that interval. It was also the fastest video to reach 100 million views on YouTube, doing so in approximately one day and 10 hours. On April 26, BigHit released a second version of the music video, titled "ARMY With Luv", dedicated to the band's fandom, ARMY. The video featured footage of the band not seen in the original version and more moments with Halsey; the large "LOVE" sign that appears atop a building while the band dances in the original was replaced with one that spelt "ARMY" instead. In December 2019, YouTube named it the most viewed music video in South Korea of the year. The music video crossed 1 billion views in October 2020, eighteen months after release, and is the band's second to reach the mark.

== Promotion ==
The band performed the song for the first time on April 13, 2019, as the musical guests on Saturday Night Live (making them the first K-pop group to perform on the show) and performed it with Halsey at the 2019 Billboard Music Awards held on May 1, 2019. BTS started their Korean promotion on April 18, 2019, on M Countdown. They performed the song again to kick off Good Morning America's Summer Concert Series at New York's Central Park on May 15, 2019, along with their 2016 single, Fire. On May 15, 2019, BTS performed the song on The Late Show with Stephen Colbert, in an appearance themed after the Beatles' first appearance on The Ed Sullivan Show in 1964. On May 21, 2019, they performed the song at The Voice's finale. On May 30, 2019, they also performed the song at Britain Got Talent's semi-final.

On November 30, BTS performed "Boy with Luv" at the 2019 Melon Music Awards with throwbacks to "Boy in Luv". On December 4, the song was performed at the 2019 Mnet Asian Music Awards. Two days later, BTS performed the song at the KIIS-FM Jingle Ball in Los Angeles, where they appeared as a headliner. In addition, BTS performed the song in South Korea at the SBS Gayo Daejun and KBS Song Festival on December 25 and 27, respectively, following which the song was performed in New York's Times Square at Dick Clark's New Year's Rockin' Eve.

== Reception ==
"The first taste of BTS' 'Map Of The Soul: Persona' was an incredibly sweet one – a vibrant burst of bubblegum pop with an added Halsey twist. Its Korean title translated to 'A Poem For Small Things' and the lyrics celebrated "the things you're interested in, the way you walk or talk, and every little trivial habit of yours" over melodies that would make even the most mundane of days seem like a dream."

— R.D. from NME

Taylor Glasby writing for Dazed labelled "Boy With Luv" as "a beacon of pop sweetness". Dazed placed it in their list of "The 20 best K-pop songs of 2019" and commended the "catchy, made-for-radio immediacy" of the song, additionally characterizing "the playful lightness of the instrumental, vocals, and overall mood" that "bring to it a joyful ingenuousness and an old-world classiness that keeps the song sounding box fresh." Writing for the Consequence of Sound, Laura Dzubay called the song "familiarly romantic". The song was included in South China Morning Post's list of "The 10 best K-pop songs of 2019". In that article, Jeff Benjamin described it as "euphoric pop sound" while praising how the song "shows their maturity and growth and comes with a message – to allow love to take over gradually and to make changes from the inside." Rhian Daly from NME called the song "addictive and deftly balanced" with Halsey's chorus "fitting in naturally and seamlessly".Billboard included the song in their list of "The 100 Best Songs of 2019: Staff List" as well as their list of "The 25 Best K-pop Songs of 2019: Critics' Picks". NME placed the song on their list of "The 50 best songs of 2019". It was also named as the Song of the Year through the public survey conducted by Gallup Korea in 2019.

"Boy with Luv" on critic lists
Critic/Publication	List	Rank	Ref.
Billboard	100 Best Songs of 2019: Staff List	37	
Billboard	25 Best K-pop Songs of 2019: Critics' Picks	15	
Melon	Top 100 K-pop Songs of All Time	74	
BuzzFeed	Best K-pop Music Videos of 2019	8	
Dazed	20 best K-pop songs of 2019	7	
Gallup Korea	Best Songs in 2019	1	
Idolator	75 Best Pop Songs of 2019	42	
Insider	57 best music videos of 2019	22	
IZM	Top 10 Singles of 2019	—	
NME	50 best songs of 2019	49	
MTV	Greatest Videos of the 2010s	1	
SCMP	10 best K-pop songs of 2019	1	

== Commercial performance ==
Upon release, "Boy With Luv" debuted at No. 1 on the real-time charts of six major music sites including Soribada, Genie, Naver, Bugs, Mnet, and Flo on April 12. On the morning of April 13, it was reported that the song ranked No. 1 in real time charts of all digital platforms including Melon, thereby achieving an "all kill". In addition, all other tracks of Map of the Soul: Persona debuted in Top 10. It was reported that multiple servers crashed, including Korea's largest music site Melon, due to the number of fans streaming at the same time. "Boy With Luv" debuted at No. 1 on the Gaon Digital Chart and topped the weekly charts for three consecutive weeks. "Boy with Luv" debuted and peaked at No. 8 on the US Billboard Hot 100 Chart, becoming the group's highest Top 10 entry following "Fake Love". The song also debuted at No. 13 on the UK Official Singles Chart, making it the highest-charting single by a Korean act. The single also launched at No. 5 on the Billboard Streaming Songs chart, the highest rank for the band on the chart so far and the second top 10 after "Fake Love" peaked at No. 7, according to the Billboard website. It also ranked No. 3 on the Digital Song Sales chart, marking the group's fourth song hitting the chart's top 10.

"Boy with Luv" was certified Platinum by the Recording Industry Association of America (RIAA) in June, for selling over one million units in the United States. It is the group's second Platinum certification following "Mic Drop". The song surpassed 100 million streams on Gaon Music Chart, earning a Platinum certification from the Korea Music Content Association (KMCA). "Boy With Luv" was certified Gold by the Australian Recording Industry Association (ARIA) for selling 35,000 units in Australia.

BTS was named one of the Top 10 artists of 2019 by Genie Music with "Boy with Luv" topping their daily chart for 26 days.

== Credits and personnel ==
Credits adapted from the liner notes of Map of the Soul: Persona.

- BTS – primary vocals
- Halsey – featured vocals, songwriting
- Pdogg – production, songwriting, keyboard, synthesizer, vocal arrangement, rap arrangement, recording engineer, digital editing
- RM – songwriting, rap arrangement, recording engineer
- Melanie Fontana – songwriting, chorus
- Michel "Lindgren" Schulz – songwriting, recording engineer
- "Hitman" Bang – songwriting
- Suga – songwriting

- Emily Weisband – songwriting
- J-Hope – songwriting
- Lee Tae-wook – guitar
- Jungkook – chorus
- Park Jin-se − recording engineer
- Alex Williams − recording engineer
- Adora – digital editing

== Accolades ==
Awards and nominations
Year	Organization	Award	Result	Ref.
2019	Melon Music Awards	Song of the Year	Won	
2019	Melon Music Awards	Best Dance Award – Male	Won	
2019	Meus Prêmios Nick	Favorite International Hit	Won	
2019	Mnet Asian Music Awards	Song of the Year	Won	
2019	Mnet Asian Music Awards	Best Music Video	Won	
2019	Mnet Asian Music Awards	Best Dance Performance Male Group	Won	
2019	Mnet Asian Music Awards	Best Video Director	Won	
2019	MTV Europe Music Awards	Best Collaboration	Nominated	
2019	MTV Video Music Awards	Best K-Pop	Won	
2019	MTV Video Music Awards	Best Art Direction	Nominated	
2019	MTV Video Music Awards	Best Choreography	Nominated	
2019	MTV Video Music Awards	Best Collaboration	Nominated	
2019	People's Choice Awards	Music Video of 2019	Nominated	
2019	Teen Choice Awards	Choice Collaboration	Won	
2019	Telehit Awards	People's Best Video	Nominated	
2020	Gaon Chart Music Awards	Song of the Year – April	Nominated	
2020	Golden Disc Awards	Digital Bonsang	Won	
2020	Golden Disc Awards	Digital Daesang	Won	
2020	Hito Music Awards	Asian song of the year	Won	
2020	iHeartRadio Music Awards	Best Music Video	Won	
2020	Korean Music Awards	Best Pop Song	Nominated	
2020	Korean Music Awards	Song of the Year	Nominated	
2020	NME Awards	Best Collaboration	Nominated	
2020	RTHK International Pop Poll Awards	Top ten International Gold Songs	Won	

=== Music program awards ===
Program	Date (21 total)	Ref.
Music Bank	April 19, 2019	
Music Bank	April 26, 2019	
Music Bank	May 3, 2019	
Music Bank	May 17, 2019	
Music Bank	May 24, 2019	
Music Bank	June 14, 2019	
Music Bank	June 21, 2019	
Show! Music Core	April 20, 2019	
Show! Music Core	April 27, 2019	
Show! Music Core	May 11, 2019	
Show! Music Core	May 18, 2019	
Show! Music Core	May 25, 2019	
Show! Music Core	June 1, 2019	
Show! Music Core	June 8, 2019	
Show! Music Core	June 15, 2019	
Show! Music Core	June 22, 2019	
Show Champion	April 24, 2019	
M Countdown	April 25, 2019	
Inkigayo	April 28, 2019	
Inkigayo	May 12, 2019	
Inkigayo	May 19, 2019	

Melon Popularity Awards
Award	Date	Ref.
Weekly Popularity Award	April 22, 2019	
Weekly Popularity Award	April 29, 2019	
Weekly Popularity Award	May 6, 2019	
Weekly Popularity Award	May 13, 2019	
Weekly Popularity Award	May 20, 2019	

== Charts ==
=== Weekly charts ===
Weekly chart performance
Chart (2019–22)	Peak position
Argentina (Argentina Hot 100)	21
Australia (ARIA)	10
Austria (Ö3 Austria Top 40)	27
Belgium (Ultratip Bubbling Under Flanders)	4
Belgium (Ultratip Bubbling Under Wallonia)	17
Brazil (Top 100 Brasil)	80
Canada Hot 100 (Billboard)	7
Canada CHR/Top 40 (Billboard)	32
CIS Airplay (TopHit)	8
Czech Republic Singles Digital (ČNS IFPI)	11
El Salvador (Monitor Latino)	13
Estonia (Eesti Tipp-40)	4
Euro Digital Song Sales (Billboard)	12
Finland (Suomen virallinen lista)	20
France (SNEP)	114
Germany (GfK)	47
Global 200 (Billboard)	151
Greece (IFPI)	5
Hungary (Single Top 40)	1
Hungary (Stream Top 40)	6
Ireland (IRMA)	14
Israel (Media Forest TV Airplay)	2
Italy (FIMI)	60
Japan (Japan Hot 100)	7
Japan Combined Weekly Singles (Oricon)	12
Latvia (LAIPA)	5
Lithuania (AGATA)	2
Malaysia (RIM)	1
Mexico (Monitor Latino)	2
Mexico Airplay (Billboard)	1
Netherlands (Single Top 100)	58
New Zealand (Recorded Music NZ)	12
Norway (VG-lista)	24
Panama (Monitor Latino)	18
Poland Airplay (ZPAV)	57
Portugal (AFP)	14
Romania (Airplay 100)	100
Scottish Singles Sales (Official Charts)	14
Singapore (RIAS)	4
Slovakia Singles Digital (ČNS IFPI)	4
South Korea (Hot 100)	1
South Korea (Gaon)	1
South Korea (Gaon) Map of the Soul: 7 version	155
Spain (Promusicae)	65
Sweden (Sverigetopplistan)	29
Switzerland (Schweizer Hitparade)	27
UK Singles (Official Charts)	13
US Billboard Hot 100	8
US Pop Airplay (Billboard)	22
US Dance Airplay (Billboard)	30
Venezuela Anglo (Record Report)	64
Vietnam (Vietnam Hot 100)	8

=== Year-end charts ===
Year-end chart performance
Chart (2019)	Position
Argentina (Monitor Latino)	41
Costa Rica (Monitor Latino)	82
Guatemala (Monitor Latino)	58
Hungary (Single Top 40)	88
Hungary (Stream Top 40)	93
Japan (Japan Hot 100)	46
Malaysia (RIM)	4
Panama (Monitor Latino)	63
Peru (Monitor Latino)	98
South Korea (Gaon)	5
Tokyo (Tokio Hot 100)	56
Uruguay (Monitor Latino)	69
Chart (2020)	Position
Japan (Japan Hot 100)	69
South Korea (Gaon)	12
Chart (2021)	Position
Japan (Japan Hot 100)	81
South Korea (Gaon)	37
Chart (2022)	Position
South Korea (Circle)	119

== Certifications ==
Region	Certification	Certified units/sales
Australia (ARIA)	Platinum	70,000^{‡}
Canada (Music Canada)	4× Platinum	320,000^{‡}
Colombia	Gold	
Denmark (IFPI Danmark)	Gold	45,000^{‡}
France (SNEP)	Gold	100,000^{‡}
Italy (FIMI)	Gold	35,000^{‡}
Mexico (AMPROFON)	2× Platinum+Gold	150,000^{‡}
New Zealand (RMNZ)	Platinum	30,000^{‡}
Poland (ZPAV) Lights / Boy with Luv	2× Diamond	500,000^{‡}
South Korea (KMCA)	Platinum	2,500,000^{*}
Spain (Promusicae)	Gold	30,000^{‡}
United Kingdom (BPI)	Gold	400,000^{‡}
United States (RIAA)	Platinum	1,000,000^{‡}
Streaming
Japan (RIAJ) Japanese version	Gold	50,000,000^{†}
Japan (RIAJ) Original	2× Platinum	200,000,000^{†}
South Korea (KMCA)	3× Platinum	300,000,000^{†}
^{*} Sales figures based on certification alone.^{‡} Sales+streaming figures based on certification alone.^{†} Streaming-only figures based on certification alone.

== Release history ==
Region	Date	Format	Label	Ref.
Korean version
Various	April 12, 2019	Download; streaming	Big Hit; Columbia; Astralwerks	
United States	April 16, 2019	Contemporary hit radio	Columbia	
Italy	May 26, 2019	Contemporary hit radio	Sony	
Japanese version
Japan	July 3, 2019	CD; DVD; download; streaming	Def Jam; Virgin	

== See also ==
- List of M Countdown Chart winners (2019)
- List of number-one songs of 2019 (Malaysia)
- List of airplay number-one hits of the 2010s (Argentina)
