= Black Swan (song) =

2020 single by BTS

Single by BTS

from the album Map of the Soul: 7
- Language: Korean; English
- Released: January 17, 2020
- Genre: Emo hip hop; trap; cloud rap
- Length: 3:18
- Label: Big Hit
- Songwriters: Pdogg; RM; August Rigo; Vince Nantes; Clyde Kelly
- Producer: Pdogg

BTS singles chronology
| "Make It Right" (2019) | "Black Swan" (2020) | "On" (2020) |

Art film
- "Black Swan" on YouTube

Music video
- "Black Swan" on YouTube

"Black Swan" is a song by South Korean boy band BTS from their fourth Korean-language studio album, Map of the Soul: 7 (2020). The song was written by RM, August Rigo, Vince Nantes, Clyde Kelly and Pdogg, with the latter of the five also handling production. It was released on January 17, 2020, as the first single by Big Hit Entertainment as a countdown to the album. Musically, it was described as an emo hip hop song featuring cloud rap and trap drum beats. The song uses lo-fi-style guitar instrumentation and contains a "catchy" hook. The lyrics are introspective and find BTS confessing, as artists, the fear of losing their passion for music.

"Black Swan" received widespread acclaim from music critics for its "honest and raw" lyrics and dark production, with comparisons being drawn to the band's 2018 single, "Fake Love". Commercially, the former debuted at number seven on South Korea's Gaon Digital Chart and at number one on the US Billboard World Digital Song Sales chart. The song debuted at number 46 on the UK Singles Chart and number 57 on the US Billboard Hot 100, in addition to entering record charts in several other territories.

Two accompanying music videos, both inspired by Darren Aronofsky's 2010 movie of the same name, were directed by YongSeok Choi of Lumpens. The first one premiered simultaneously with the release of the single in the form of an "art film," including an interpretive dance performance by Slovenian-based modern dance troupe MN Dance Company. The second video, released without any prior announcements, is choreography-heavy and depicts BTS transforming into eponymous black swans on the stage of a theatre. The debut of "Black Swan", on The Late Late Show with James Corden, received positive reviews from critics, who praised the band's "impassioned" performance and "intricate" choreography. Following the release of Map of the Soul: 7, BTS promoted the song with televised live performances on several South Korean music programs, including M! Countdown, Music Bank, and Inkigayo.

== Background and release ==
Following the release of their sixth extended play Map of the Soul: Persona (2019), BTS took an "extended period of rest and relaxation" in the midst of their Love Yourself World Tour to "recharge and prepare to present themselves anew as musicians and creators" and "enjoy the lives of young people "in their 20s." On January 7, 2020, the band announced a return to music with the release of their fourth Korean-language studio album Map of the Soul: 7, on February 21 of that year. A "comeback map" for the album was released on January 8, 2020, revealing a schedule split into four phases. The map featured multiple dates, including the release dates for the album's two singles. Details on the first single, including its title and artwork, were revealed in conjunction with the release of the song. "Black Swan", the first single from Map of the Soul: 7, was made available for digital download and streaming in various countries on January 17, 2020, by Big Hit Entertainment. The song was written by RM, August Rigo, Vince Nantes, Clyde Kelly, and Pdogg. It was produced by Pdogg, while mixed by DJ Riggins, Jaycen Joshua, Jacob Richards and Max Seaberg. The song was released one week after BTS teased the track "Interlude: Shadow" from the album, performed by band member Suga. The release was in line with the band's global public art project, Connect, BTS, bringing together 22 contemporary artists across the world for curating works that resonate BTS' philosophy.

== Composition and lyrics ==
"Black Swan"
A 19-second sample leading up to the bridge of "Black Swan", described as an emo hip hop song featuring trap drum beats and guitar instrumentation which music critics compared to the band's 2018 single "Fake Love".

"Black Swan" has been described as an emo hip hop song that derives its style from trap drum beats and "doleful" lo-fi-style guitar instrumentation. Featuring cloud rap and a "catchy" hook, the song is built around an instrumental refrain. Some music critics identified it as an R&B ballad. In terms of music notation, the song is composed in the key of D minor, with a tempo of 147 beats per minute, and has a length of 3:18. Two versions of the song were released, a studio version on digital streaming platforms and an orchestral version accompanying an "art film." The latter features a capella vocals layered over "stripped-down" string-heavy instrumental production. In its composition, the studio version incorporates "synth-y guitar riffs" and a "pounding beat." The blend of trap beats with "mournful" instrumentals during production was used to create an "atmospheric" and "haunting" mood. Jason Lipshutz, writing for Billboard, noted that the instrumentation accentuates "the interwoven hooks, rap verses and falsetto exclamations." The song opens with distinctly East Asian riffs built over a rhapsodic melody, accompanied by distorted vocals. Pitchfork's Sheldon Pearce noted the heavy use of Auto-Tune in the song. Meanwhile, Evening Standard's Jochan Embley noted that the track incorporated the traditional Korean 12-stringed gayageum. Throughout the song, BTS' vocals are "layered and processed" to make them "indistinguishable" from each other, showing how they are one unit of seven people, while the minimalist sounds represent a subdued inner. At several points, the voices of the band sound like "an inner monologue torn between pushing through and carrying on as normal" or "being riddled with uncertainty and hesitation." Critics have compared the song to BTS' 2018 single "Fake Love".

According to Yonhap News Agency, "Black Swan" continues the theme of exploring one's ego from BTS' previous album, Map of the Soul: Persona, inspired by Swiss psychiatrist Carl Jung's theories of human psychology. The Korea Times's press release described the song as "a confession of an artist who has truly learned what music means to himself," in which "BTS dives deep into their inner selves as artists and faces the shadows they had once hidden." In an interview with Zach Sang, the band described the song as "very personal" in which they wanted to talk about their shadows. In the trap ballet, BTS use introspective lyrics to confess the fear of losing passion for music. "Black Swan" details the relationship artists have with their craft, comparing the harrowing feeling of loss of love for the craft to death, with lyrics such as "If this can no longer resonate, no longer make my heart vibrate, then like this may be how I die my first death." (Note: Original Hangul lyrics: 이게 나를 더 못 울린다면 (Ige nareul deo ullindamyeon) 내 가슴을 더 떨리게 못 한다면 (Nae gaseumeul deo tteollge mot handamyeon) 어쩜 이렇게 한 번 죽겠지 아마 (Eojjeom ireoke han beon jukgetji ama))

== Reception ==
"Black Swan" was met with acclaim from music critics. In her review for Consequence of Sound, Hannah Zwick complimented the song's "beautiful blend of trap drumbeats and strings, rap and vocals, that creates an atmosphere of anxiety before you even read the lyrics" and chose the song as a highlight of Map of the Soul: 7. Stereogum critic Chris DeVille felt that the version accompanying the art film "infuses it with classical elements to go along with the video’s modern dance routine." Writing for MTV, Crystal Bell regarded the song as BTS' "darkest single" since "Fake Love" in 2018, adding that the song characterizes "BTS at their most raw and unflinching," and is "deeper and more painful." So Seung-Geun from IZM viewed it as "heavy and philosophical" and described the song's production as "dark and serious." Calling the sound "mature," he rated the song four out of five stars, writing that "two completely different elements of Oriental Classic and Western Trend are compatible and entangled in an enlarged position, embodying the inner desire to fly much like a feather." In his review of Map of the Soul: 7 for the Los Angeles Times, August Brown described "Black Swan" as "foggy," "arty" and "catchy as hell" and stated that, "If 7 has a statement of purpose, it’s probably this cut. It shows the biggest band in the world as attentive students of trippy modern hip-hop, but aware of the meticulousness and skill they bring to it as well." Raisa Bruner of Time magazine listed "Black Swan" amongst the five best songs of the week and praised BTS' "focus on detail" for crafting "a maze of connected narratives that blend visuals with song lyrics and sound" and further added, "BTS' desire in this phase to express their passion for their art and its impact on their lives has never been more evident." Labelling "Black Swan" as "honest and raw," Rhian Daly from NME called it "a haunting, melancholy curveball" that deviates "from an immediate, radio-friendly choice", putting "artistry ahead of mass appeal". Sophia Simon-Bashall of The Line of Best Fit favoured the production incorporating modern trap beats with traditional Korean instruments while also appreciating the song's lyrical content and wrote, "It speaks to anyone who has been through depression, the uniquely crushing experience of losing interest in what once gave meaning. It reaches out a hand to acknowledge that pain and provides a reminder to fight." In his review for Clash, Robin Murray regarded the track as "a stunning return, steering their infinitely appealing pop template into left-field landscapes." Vannessa Jackson of E! Online deemed it their "most dramatic song yet."

Initially, "Black Swan" debuted at number 7 on the Gaon Digital Chart for the issue date of January 25, 2020, ultimately reaching number 10 following the release of Map of the Soul: 7. The song debuted and peaked at number two on the Gaon Download Chart, remaining in the top five for two consecutive weeks. "Black Swan" was the 11th best-performing song of the February 2020 issue of the Gaon Monthly Digital Chart, based on streaming, digital sales and downloads. The song debuted at number 57 on the US Billboard Hot 100 becoming BTS' eighth entry on the chart, and ranked at number 46 on the UK Singles Chart. Additionally, it debuted atop the US Billboard World Digital Song Sales chart for the issue date of February 1, 2020, becoming the band's 18th chart-topper, and the song entered the US Digital Song Sales chart at number 2. The song charted at number 63 on the Canadian Hot 100 chart and number 9 on the New Zealand Hot Singles chart, an extension to the New Zealand Top 40 chart. The song was also moderately successful in several other territories including Australia, Germany, Japan, Switzerland, Ireland and Flemish region of Belgium.

=== Accolades ===
The song achieved substantial popularity, earning the Melon Popularity Award for five consecutive weeks.

Melon Popularity Award
| Award | Date | Ref. |
|---|---|---|
| Weekly Popularity Award | January 27, 2020 | |
| Weekly Popularity Award | February 3, 2020 | |
| Weekly Popularity Award | February 10, 2020 | |
| Weekly Popularity Award | February 17, 2020 | |
| Weekly Popularity Award | February 24, 2020 | |

Awards and nominations for "Black Swan"
| Year | Organization | Award | Result | Ref. |
|---|---|---|---|---|
| 2021 | Gaon Chart Music Awards | Song of the Year – January | Nominated | |

Year-end lists for Black Swan
| Publication | List | Rank | Ref. |
|---|---|---|---|
| Billboard | The 20 Best K-Pop Songs of 2020: Critics' Picks | 8 | |
| CNN Philippines | Our best K-pop songs of 2020 | —N/a | |
| Dazed | The 40 best K-pop songs of 2020 | —N/a | |
| Paper | The 40 Best K-pop Songs of 2020 | 9 | |

== Music videos ==
=== Art film ===
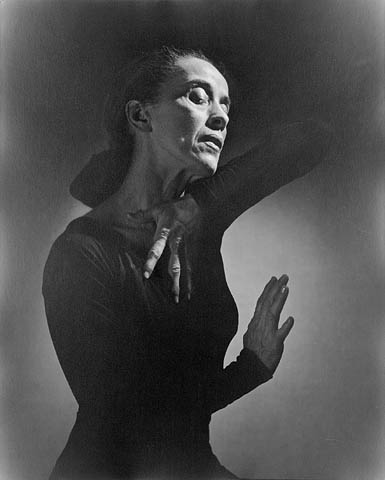
The art film is fronted by a quote from modern dance legend Martha Graham (pictured in 1948).

A music video for "Black Swan" was directed by YongSeok Choi of Lumpens and premiered simultaneously with the song's release on YouTube. Hyunwoo Nam of GDW was credited as the director of photography and Tiffany Suh as the producer. The video is in the form of an "art film," featuring an interpretive dance performance by Slovenian-based modern dance troupe MN Dance Company, danced to the orchestral version of the song. The video was inspired by the movie Black Swan (2010). The art film opens with a quote from American dancer Martha Graham, "A dancer dies twice — once when they stop dancing, and this first death is more painful", a quote which echoes the theme of the song. The video then fades to an abandoned mall where seven dancers, in a straight line, walk into the frame. The following scene shows one shirtless lead dancer standing apart from the rest, who are dressed in over-sized suits. The video runs for five minutes and showcases symbolic contemporary choreography that "gets more intense, combative" as the lead dancer, turning into the "black swan", tries to escape from the clutches of the other six shadowed figures and break free from the cage of light. In some scenes, the dancer is entirely alone, dancing for himself. The performance ends with the lead dancer being raised towards the sky by the others, alongside him flapping his arms like a bird. Visually, the clip explores "the grappling of conflicting emotions" offered in the lyrics, as reinterpreted by the dancers. Commenting on why the art film was chosen, Jimin stated that "It was a new experience for us [...] ‘Black Swan’ is a confession by artists, so we wanted to focus on bringing out an artistic atmosphere." NPR's Stephen Thompson called the art film "lavishly choreographed" and pointed out how it "nicely reflects the song's message — about artists' fraught relationship with the work that sustains them." Christie D'Zurilla, writing for the Los Angeles Times, labelled the visual "artsy". Entertainment Weekly's Nick Romano called it as "honest and raw" as the Black Swan film. Reviewing for Clash, Robin Murray deemed the video as "a riveting watch." Corey Atad of Entertainment Tonight Canada echoed similar sentiments and acknowledged the "gorgeous interpretive dance." Ellie Nicholas of Celebmix connected the music video with the song's lyrics and gave a positive review, writing "The phenomenal choreography meshed with the orchestral instrumental and lyrics created a truly moving atmosphere to really bring to life the meaning of the track."

=== Music video ===
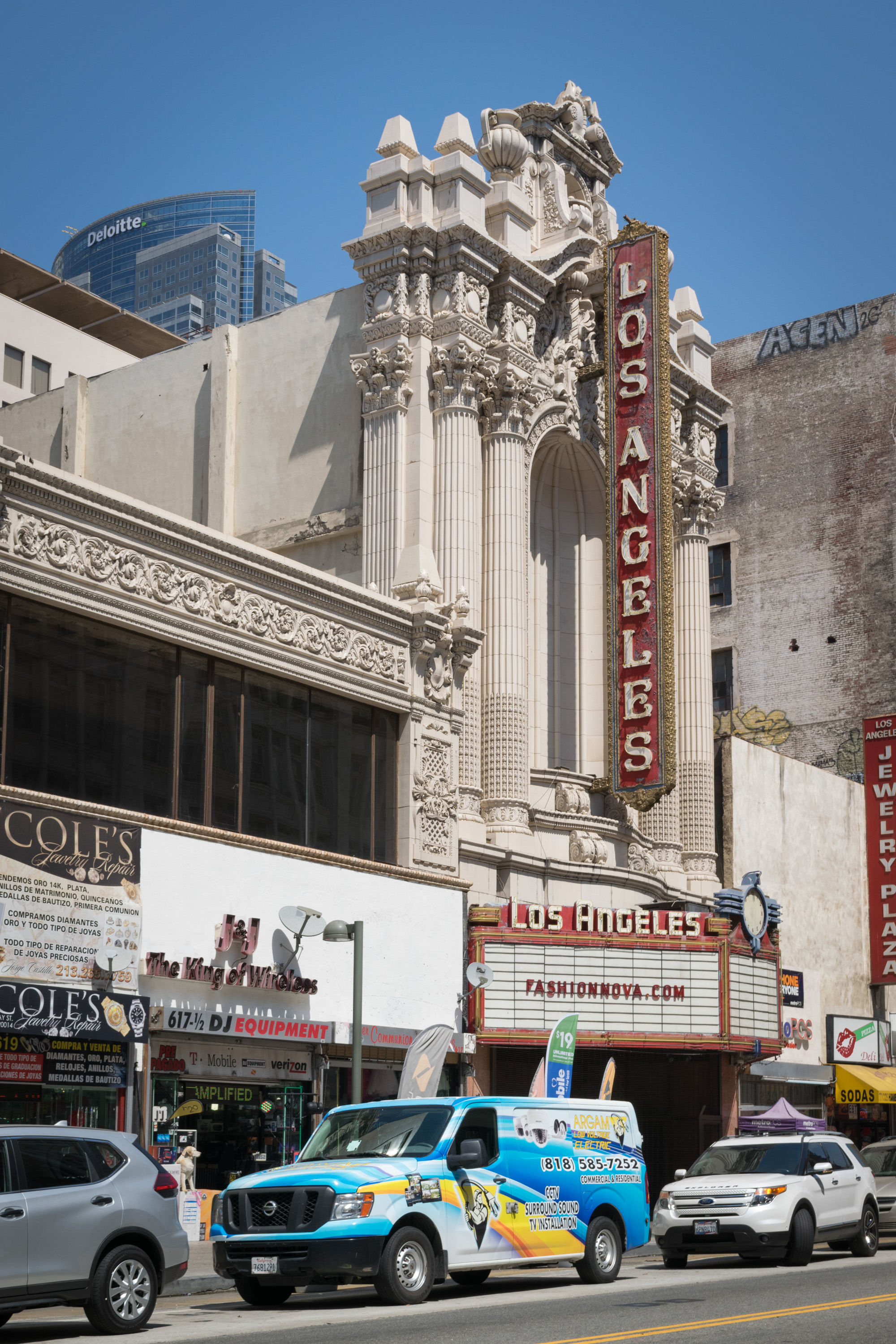
The Los Angeles Theatre (pictured) served as the filming location for the second music video.

A second accompanying music video was uploaded to Big Hit's official YouTube channel on March 4, 2020, without any prior announcements. It was also directed by YongSeok Choi, and co-directed by Guzza, both from Lumpens, while the video was shot in the Los Angeles Theatre. The music video is dark and choreography-heavy, seeing BTS transforming into eponymous black swans. The visual opens with BTS clad in white, standing on the dark stage of an intimate theatre. In the following scenes, the members are seen delivering their verses while surrounded by an ornate vaulted ceiling and gilded fixtures. The video alternates between close-ups of each member interacting with their shadows and group-shots of them performing "intricate" choreography on an empty stage. Suga is seen rapping in the backdrop of mural paintings when his shadow breaks free from his body and dances in the background. Several solo shots of Jimin's elegant choreography are shown; at one point, he spreads his wings like a bird. Jin is seen contemplating his reflection in a hall of mirrors, as he is haunted by himself. Throughout the video, BTS switch from white to black outfits, matching the "Black Swan" concept photos of the album. This is a metaphor for portraying the perception of good and evil as shadows play a central part in the video, alluding to the recurring theme of Map of the Soul: 7 and visual representation of the song's lyrics. The video draws heavy references to "Jungian shadows", Darren Aronofsky's 2010 psychological thriller film of the same name, as well as Tchaikovsky's ballet Swan Lake (1876). In her review for Vulture, Rebecca Alter called the video "perfect." Lake Schatz of Consequence of Sound wrote that "the group's bold and exquisite dance work is captivating in itself, but also symbolizes a swan-like transformation, as BTS eventually swap their crisp white suits for black ones." Paper magazine's Matt Moen called it "positively breathtaking."

== Live performances ==
BTS performed "Black Swan" for the first time on The Late Late Show with James Corden on January 28, 2020. For the performance, choreography by Brazilian-born choreographer Sergio Reis was commissioned. Big Hit had seen performances by Reis' Netherlands-based dance crew CDK, which "had a similar 'dark' feel to" what was wanted for "Black Swan". During the song's well-received performance, the band members were barefoot on stage, dressed in black suits. The performance set was elaborate, bolstered by an LCD-screen waterfall that made it look like they were performing in the backdrop of a darkened forest or on a frosty lake. Writing for Rolling Stone, Emily Zemler praised the performance, saying that "it was a notably impressive and energized rendition of the track and featured some impassioned barefoot choreography." Tom Breihan of Stereogum lauded the band's "intricate" choreography and wrote: "As pure pop spectacle, it was magnificent." Alyssa Bailey of Elle called it "one of the most breathtaking performances" and wrote, "one of the most mesmerizing aspects is the group's ability to perform elaborate, high-energy choreography while being perfectly in sync with each other and singing." Following the release of the album in February 2020, BTS performed "Black Swan" on several South Korean music programs, including Mnet's M! Countdown, KBS's Music Bank and SBS's Inkigayo.

== Credits and personnel ==
Credits adapted from Tidal and the liner notes of Map of the Soul: 7.

- BTS – primary vocals
  - RM - songwriting
  - J-Hope – chorus
  - Jungkook – chorus
- Pdogg – production, songwriting, keyboard, synthesizer, vocal arrangement, rap arrangement, recording engineer
- August Rigo – songwriting
- Vince Nantes – songwriting
- Clyde Kelly – songwriting
- DJ Riggins – mix engineer
- Jaycen Joshua – mix engineer
- Jacob Richards – mix engineer
- Max Seaberg – mix engineer
- Hiss noise – digital editing

== Charts ==
=== Weekly charts ===
Weekly chart performance
| Chart (2020–2022) | Peak position |
|---|---|
| Australia (ARIA) | 87 |
| Austria (Ö3 Austria Top 40) | 62 |
| Belgium (Ultratip Bubbling Under Flanders) | 23 |
| Canada Hot 100 (Billboard) | 63 |
| Czech Republic Singles Digital (ČNS IFPI) | 69 |
| Estonia (Eesti Ekspress) | 11 |
| Euro Digital Song Sales (Billboard) | 3 |
| France (SNEP) | 117 |
| Germany (GfK) | 77 |
| Greece (IFPI) | 16 |
| Hong Kong (HKRIA) | 2 |
| Hungary (Single Top 40) | 1 |
| Hungary (Stream Top 40) | 37 |
| Ireland (IRMA) | 49 |
| Japan (Japan Hot 100) | 31 |
| Lithuania (AGATA) | 16 |
| Malaysia (RIM) | 1 |
| New Zealand Hot Singles (RMNZ) | 9 |
| Scottish Singles Sales (Official Charts) | 9 |
| Singapore (RIAS) | 2 |
| Slovakia Singles Digital (ČNS IFPI) | 62 |
| South Korea (Gaon) | 7 |
| South Korea (K-pop Hot 100) | 4 |
| Sweden (Sverigetopplistan) | 93 |
| Switzerland (Schweizer Hitparade) | 45 |
| UK Singles (Official Charts) | 46 |
| US Billboard Hot 100 | 57 |
| US Rolling Stone Top 100 | 50 |
| Vietnam (Vietnam Hot 100) | 59 |

=== Monthly charts ===
Monthly chart performance
| Chart (2020) | Position |
|---|---|
| South Korea (Gaon) | 11 |

=== Year-end charts ===
Year-end chart performance
| Chart (2020) | Position |
|---|---|
| South Korea (Gaon) | 44 |

== Certifications ==
Streaming certifications for "Black Swan"
| Region | Certification | Certified units/sales |
|---|---|---|
| Mexico (AMPROFON) | Gold | 30,000^{‡} |
| New Zealand (RMNZ) | Gold | 15,000^{‡} |
| United States (RIAA) | Gold | 500,000^{‡} |
Streaming
| Japan (RIAJ) | Gold | 50,000,000^{†} |
^{‡} Sales+streaming figures based on certification alone.^{†} Streaming-only figures based on certification alone.

== Release history ==
| Region | Date | Format(s) | Label | Ref. |
|---|---|---|---|---|
| Various | January 17, 2020 | Digital download; streaming | Big Hit Entertainment | |

== See also ==
- List of number-one songs of 2020 (Malaysia)
- List of top 10 singles in 2020 (France)
