= Fake Love (BTS song) =

2018 single by BTS

- "Rocking Vibe Mix" single cover

Single by BTS

from the album Love Yourself: Tear
- Released: May 18, 2018
- Genre: Emo hip hop; rap rock; electropop
- Length: 4:02
- Label: Big Hit; Columbia; Universal Japan
- Songwriters: "Hitman" Bang; Pdogg; RM
- Producer: Pdogg

BTS singles chronology
"Don't Leave Me" (2018)	"Fake Love" (2018)	"Idol" (2018)

Alternative cover
- Japanese single cover

BTS Japanese singles chronology
"Don't Leave Me" (2018)	"Fake Love" / "Airplane Pt. 2" (2018)	"Lights" / "Boy with Luv" (2019)

Music video
- "Fake Love" on YouTube

"Fake Love" is a song recorded in Korean and Japanese by South Korean band BTS. It was written by "Hitman" Bang, RM, and Pdogg, with Pdogg as producer. The Korean version was released through Big Hit Entertainment on May 18, 2018, as the lead single from the band's third album Love Yourself: Tear (2018). Columbia Records serviced the song to US contemporary hit radio on June 12, 2018, as a single in the country. A remix, titled "Rocking Vibe", was released on June 4, 2018, and appears on the band's third compilation album, Love Yourself: Answer (2018). The Japanese version of the song was released for digital download and streaming on October 16, 2018, by Universal Music Japan as a single album that included the remix and "Airplane Pt. 2", both also in Japanese. "Fake Love" is an emo hip hop, rap-rock and electropop song which relies on rock instrumentals. The lyrics talk about a love that was once believed to be destiny, but turned out to be fake at the end.

The song received generally positive reviews from critics who praised its dark production, eclectic sound, and the band's vocal delivery. It received several accolades, including the Song of the Year and Best Pop Song at the 2019 Korean Music Awards, and appeared on the decade-end lists of NME and Consequence of Sound. Commercially, the Korean version of "Fake Love" debuted at number one on the Gaon Digital Chart and number ten on the US Billboard Hot 100, becoming the band's first top-ten single in the US. The Japanese version debuted and peaked at number one on the Oricon Singles Chart, becoming the 12th best-selling single of 2018 in Japan. It was certified platinum for both streaming and digital download sales by the Korea Music Content Association (KMCA) and double platinum by the Recording Industry Association of Japan (RIAJ).

Two music videos, for the original and the remix, were directed by YongSeok Choi. Premiering on May 18, 2018, the first video follows the story-line of BTS' fictional narrative universe and depicts the band dancing on various sets. The second video, an extended version of the first, was released on June 1, 2018, and has some additional footage. The debut performance of "Fake Love" at the 2018 Billboard Music Awards received positive reviews from critics. BTS later promoted the song with televised live performances on several South Korean music programs in 2018, including M! Countdown, Music Bank, and Inkigayo. It was also included on the setlist of their Love Yourself World Tour (2018–19).

== Background and release ==
BTS embarked on their extended three-part series "Love Yourself" with the release of their fifth extended play Love Yourself: Her in 2017. On April 16, 2018, the band announced the sequel of Her in the form of their third Korean-language studio album, Love Yourself: Tear. "Fake Love" was confirmed to be a part of Love Yourself: Tear, when the band shared the track-listing of the album. On May 14 of that year, it was announced as the first single from the album. The song was written by "Hitman" Bang, RM and its producer Pdogg. It was engineered by Pdogg and Jeong Wooyeong, while mixing was handled by James F. Reynolds at Schmuzik Studios. Backing vocals for the track was provided by band member Jungkook alongside Supreme Boi. BTS recorded the song at Big Hit Studios in Seoul, South Korea.

Talking about the song, RM explained in a V Live broadcast that among all songs on the album, "Fake Love" was most difficult to work on. The main foundation of it was created by him, while the rest of the song-making process was handled by Pdogg and "Hitman" Bang. He also shared a demo version of the track during the broadcast, which he felt was "completely different" and "more depressing and deeper" than the recorded one. Speaking about how the song was conceived, he said:

"To adjust to voice range of our vocalists, we change the pitch in the end so rappers often have difficulty adjusting to that. (In case of this song), it went up by 6 1/2 pitches as far as I know. Six and half -- that makes a totally different song! We adjusted to that pitch and added the guitar sound and there came the 'Fake Love' we listen to now."

"Fake Love" was released for digital download and streaming in various countries by Big Hit Entertainment on May 18, 2018, as the lead single from Love Yourself: Tear. On June 12 of that year, Columbia Records serviced the song to contemporary hit radio in the United States as a single in that country. A "Rocking Vibe" remix version of the track was recorded and issued digitally on June 4, 2018. It was subsequently included on the band's third compilation album, Love Yourself: Answer (2018). The remix has identical songwriting credits to the original version with the addition of Slow Rabbit serving as producer. A Japanese version of the song was made available for digital purchase on October 16, 2018, by Universal Music Japan as the band's ninth Japanese-language single album, together with the Japanese versions of the remix and previously released Korean track "Airplane Pt. 2" (2018). It was also released as a four-version CD single in Japan on November 7, 2018, with a regular edition and three different limited editions: A, B and C. All four editions contain Japanese versions of the original and remix of "Fake Love", "Airplane Pt. 2", and a "stadium" remix of their 2018 Korean single, "Idol". In addition, edition A includes a DVD containing the music videos for "Fake Love" and "Airplane Pt. 2". Edition B also comes with a DVD that contains behind the scenes footage of the music video for "Airplane Pt. 2" and the making of album jacket photos, while C contains a 36-page photobook. The lyrics for the Japanese version were written by KM-Markit. It was later included as the eighth track on the band's fourth Japanese-language studio album, Map of the Soul: 7 – The Journey (2020).

== Music and lyrics ==
"Fake Love"
A 24-second sample of the pre-chorus and chorus of "Fake Love", an emo hip hop, rap-rock and electropop song, driven by rock instrumentals in which the band use "anguished" and "wailing" vocals. The lyrics address themes of loss of self-identity to love and toxic relationship.

"Fake Love" is a emo hip hop, rap-rock and electropop song with elements of pop-rock, trap and adult contemporary music. It is composed in 4/4 time in the key of D minor, with a moderate tempo of 78 beats per minute, and runs for 4:02. Though the song keeps up with the band's signature hip hop sound, it employs a dark production consisting of thumping trap beats, "gritty guitars", "ambient synth quirks" and "doomy bass." The song primarily relies on rock instrumentation which includes electric guitar, drums, keyboards, and synthesizers. The drums have a repeating kick and snare sequence, which remains constant throughout the song. The verses are led by both arpeggiated and rhythm guitars.

The song makes use of dissonant and dark chord progressions and contains a "tense" chorus which is boosted by heavy bass. It features a "tenacious" and "blocky" bassline, which was compared to that of Atlanta hip-hop. The opening verse uses a "serpentine" delivery characterized by "breathy" vocals while the refrain is accompanied by "wailing" vocals from band. The song features "anguished" singing blending "warm" melodies and "dreamy, echoing" verses with "brusque" raps. The staccato-driven rapped verses follow the triplet flow saturating hip hop. The remix version adds "dynamic" electronic and acoustic string instruments over the original melody, introducing rock vibes to the song. The latter is also composed in the same key as the original recording, but with a moderately fast tempo of 155 beats per minute.

Lyrically, the song talks about love that was once believed to be destiny, but turned out fake at the end and reflects the theme of the entire "Love Yourself" series — "that any love wherein one does not love oneself is not real." It also recounts the emptiness that comes to a person who has invested too much in a relationship, only to lose one's own identity in the process through lyrics such as, "I even became quite unsure of who I was / Try babbling into the mirror, who the heck are you?" The lyrics further reference to the notion of holding onto a toxic relationship: "I grew a flower that can't be bloomed in a dream that can't come true." Lines like "Mold a pretty lie for you" and "Try to erase myself and make me your doll" suggest themes of "hiding depression" and "pressure" to maintain relationships despite struggling with mental health. During the chorus, the band chant the titular phrase singing, "I'm so sick of this fake love" admitting "disenchantment."

== Critical reception ==
"Fake Love" received generally positive reviews from critics. Jeff Benjamin of Paper praised the track's sound and the band's vocal delivery, writing that the song "might very well be the best representation of the pop excellence BTS brings to music." In The Korea Herald, Dam-young Hong wrote that the musical style "offers an overwhelming sense of darkness and maturity" to the song. She also appreciated its lyrical content, writing that the "poetic refrains" used throughout it "adds to the song's ineffable sensitivity." Hyun-su Yim, also of The Korea Herald, praised the song for "brilliantly" capturing the "genre-bending" and "emotion-heavy" musical essence of BTS. Rhian Daly of NME commended the "dark" production and labelled the song "beautifully gloomy," adding that the track is an "early instance of BTS tackling the idea of one's persona." IZM's Do-heon Kim compared the song to the band's previous tracks "I Need U" (2015) and "Blood Sweat & Tears" (2016), and praised the blend of "aggressive" guitar riff, "tensed synth samples," and "dreamy sounds" in the production which recreates "depression and anxiety" that is expressed through the "emotive" lyrics of the song. Markos Papadatos of Digital Journal said the song was "sonically and lyrically powerful" and "embodies the emotions of saying goodbye in a raw yet sincere fashion." He called the lyrics "exceptional".

"Fake Love" was positively reviewed by the writers of Rolling Stone, who likened the guitar line to that of '80s rock band, Def Leppard and stated that the track "is an impressive fusion, simultaneously bruised and bruising." In a separate review, music critic Elias Leight of the same publication viewed the song as "a jolt of angst-ridden, arena-ready rap-rock." Jess Lau of The 405 wrote that the song displayed significant growth in the band's sound and deemed it as the strongest track on Love Yourself: Tear. Writing for Spin, Blanca Méndez stated that the song "turns dark and marries the drama of Wings with the angst of their 2015 album The Most Beautiful Moment in Life: Young Forever." Dan Weiss of Consequence of Sound deemed it as a "breathy anthem-ballad," while Idolator's Mike Nied called the song "mega-infectious." Reviewing for Vulture, Kim Youngdae and Park T.K. opined that the song's music was "carefully selected to amplify" the central message of the album. They further wrote, "the tension between electric guitar and a hip-hop beat creates a sense of dark resolve, unique among contemporary K-Pop and even among BTS's other music."

In a Billboard publication, Caitlin Kelley cited it as one of the best songs of the band and wrote, "this is BTS at their angstiest, wallowing in the heartache of changing yourself so much for someone that your love is fake." Writing for The Malaysia Star, Chester Chin praised the song for "its explosive hook-heavy glory." Taylor Glasby from Dazed appreciated the "poignant rawness of the pre-choruses" while also complimenting the song's lyrical content. She also wrote an article for Clash, where she viewed the track "brittle pinnacle of deception." In another review for Vogue, she described the song as a "moody emo anthem." Salva Mubarak, of the same magazine, deemed the track as "iconic," citing its "unexpectedly complex music arrangement and lyrics." Billboard ranked "Fake Love" at number 22 on their list of 2018's best songs. Other publications that included the track among their lists of the best songs of 2018 were The Dong-a Ilbo, The Guardian, The New York Times, and Rolling Stone. The latter also ranked "Fake Love" as one of the greatest boy band songs of all time. Consequence of Sound and NME placed it on their decade-end list of the 100 best songs of the 2010s. "Fake Love" won the Song of the Year and Best Pop Song awards at the Korean Music Awards in 2019. It also won the Best Rap / Hip Hop song at the 2018 Melon Music Awards. The song also achieved the top spot on various South Korean music programs, garnering a total of 12 awards including "triple-crowns" (three consecutive wins) on Music Bank, Show! Music Core and Inkigayo. It also achieved five consecutive Melon Weekly Popularity Awards due to its substantial success on digital platforms.

== Awards and nominations ==
Awards for "Fake Love"
Year	Organization	Award	Result	Ref.
2018	Mnet Asian Music Awards	Mwave Global Fan Choice	Won	
2018	Mnet Asian Music Awards	Best Dance Performance – Male Group	Nominated	
2018	Mnet Asian Music Awards	Song of the Year	Nominated	
2018	Mnet Asian Music Awards	Best Choreographer of the Year	Won	
2018	Mnet Asian Music Awards	Best Art Director of the Year	Won	
2018	Melon Music Award	Song of the Year	Nominated	
2018	Melon Music Award	Best Rap/Hip Hop	Won	
2018	MBC Plus X Genie Music Awards	Song of the Year	Nominated	
2018	MBC Plus X Genie Music Awards	Rap/Hip Hop Music Award	Nominated	
2018	MTV Video Music Awards Japan	Best Group Video – International	Won	
2018	Soompi Awards	Music Video Of The Year	Won	
2019	Gaon Chart Music Awards	Song of the Year – May	Nominated	
2019	Golden Disc Awards	Digital Bonsang	Won	
2019	Hito Music Awards	Asian song of the year	Won	
2019	Korean Music Awards	Song of the Year	Won	
2019	Korean Music Awards	Best Pop Song	Won	
2019	Myx Music Award	Favorite International Video	Won	

Music program awards for "Fake Love"
Program	Date (12 total)	Ref.
Music Bank	May 25, 2018	
Music Bank	June 1, 2018	
Music Bank	June 8, 2018	
Show! Music Core	May 26, 2018	
Show! Music Core	June 2, 2018	
Show! Music Core	June 9, 2018	
Inkigayo	May 27, 2018	
Inkigayo	June 3, 2018	
Inkigayo	June 10, 2018	
Show Champion	May 30, 2018	
M Countdown	May 31, 2018	
M Countdown	June 7, 2018	

== Commercial performance ==
"Fake Love" was a commercial success in South Korea. It debuted at number six on the Gaon Digital Chart for issue date of May 19, 2018. The following week, it climbed to number one and also peaked at number one on the component Download Chart. The single remained in the top five of the digital chart for five consecutive weeks before falling for the week of June 30, 2018. "Fake Love" was the third best-performing song of the June 2018 issue of the Gaon Monthly Digital Chart based on digital sales, streaming, and background music (instrumental track) downloads. It was eventually the 19th best-selling song of 2018 in South Korea, selling over 680,480,472 digital units. In addition, the song peaked at number one on the Billboard K-pop Hot 100 on the chart issue dated May 26, 2018. "Fake Love" received platinum certifications, for both streaming and download, from the Korea Music Content Association (KMCA), denoting over 100 million streams and 2.5 million digital download sales, respectively.

"Fake Love" debuted and peaked at number 10 on the US Billboard Hot 100 on the issue date of June 2, 2018, selling 29,000 digital copies, which was the highest debut on the chart for that week. It became BTS' first top-ten entry on the chart and the highest-charting song by a Korean band in the United States, surpassing their own record achieved with 2017 song "Mic Drop" at number 28. BTS also became the second K-pop act to chart a top-ten song in the country after Psy achieved it with "Gangnam Style" and "Gentleman" in 2012 and 2013, respectively. The single appeared at number seven on the Billboard Streaming Songs chart with 27.8 million streams in its opening week, becoming their first top-ten on the chart. It also became their fifth number one on the US World Digital Songs chart. On the Pop Songs chart, the single peaked at number 34 in the week of July 21, 2018. It was certified gold by the Recording Industry Association of America (RIAA), for track equivalent sales of 500,000 units becoming BTS' third song to do so. "Fake Love" debuted and peaked at number 22 on the Canadian Hot 100 chart. In the United Kingdom, it debuted at number 42 on the Singles Chart, and reached number 3 on the Indie Chart. "Fake Love" appeared on the Australian Singles Chart at number 36, which later became its peak. It was certified gold by the Australian Recording Industry Association (ARIA) for track-equivalent sales of 35,000. The song peaked at number one in both Malaysia and Singapore. Additionally, it made top 40 appearances in Austria, New Zealand, Russia, Scotland, Slovakia, Switzerland and Flemish region of Belgium.

Following the release of the song as a single album in Japan, "Fake Love / Airplane Pt.2" topped the Oricon Daily Singles Chart on its first day of release, selling 327,342 copies. The single remained at number one on the daily chart for the next six days, selling 454,829 physical copies in its first week. By doing so, the band became the first foreign artist to surpass 400,000 copies in a week. "Fake Love / Airplane Pt. 2" peaked at number one on the Oricon Weekly Singles Chart for the chart issue dated November 5–11, 2018. It sold 481,000 copies in the month of November 2018, achieving higher sales than their previous Japanese single album "Mic Drop / DNA / Crystal Snow". For the year end chart, it was the 12th best-selling single of 2018 in the country. It additionally charted at number one on the Billboard Japan Hot 100 on the issue date of November 19, 2018. On December 9, 2018, the single album received double platinum certification from the Recording Industry Association of Japan (RIAJ), denoting shipments of 500,000 copies. On June 26, 2020, "Fake Love" received a silver streaming certification from the RIAJ for 30 million digital streams. It received gold certification the following year, on February 23, 2021, for surpassing 50 million streams.

== Music videos ==
Scene showing silhouettes of seven members dressed in black leather during the opening verse of "Fake Love". The darker lighting and bleak colours of the music video contrast that of their previous single, "DNA" (2017).

The music video for "Fake Love" was directed by YongSeok Choi of Lumpens. HyunWoo Nam of GDW was credited as the director of photography, while HyunSuk Song served as the gaffer. The video premiered on Big Hit's YouTube channel at 18:00 KST (08:00 UTC) on May 18, 2018; it was preceded by two teasers released on the same platform on May 14 and 16. The "high-production" visual is almost five-minutes long and features a darker atmosphere compared to that of the previous single, "DNA" (2017). It continues the extended story-line of BTS' fictional narrative universe by connecting "fantasy and reality, past and present" with multiple Easter eggs, and symbolisms. The video opens with a flower trapped inside a glass and then switches to show close-up shots of band members Jin and Jungkook. The clip then blacks out briefly before showing silhouettes of the seven members who start performing choreography as the opening line of the song plays. As the light brightens, the members are seen dressed in black leather outfits. The visual then rewinds to show Jin standing inside a room painted in bleak colours and filled with shattered glass. Jungkook plays the protagonist of the visual, as he runs through a hallway as floorboards collapse beneath his feet. Throughout the video, he searches for his band-mates on his own inside a maze-like manor. The video alternates with scenes which show the members reflecting their own personal struggles in several decaying rooms and group-shots of the band performing furious and tight choreography in an "imposing collection of sets". In some scenes, they are also seen staring blankly at the camera. Over the course of the clip, Jin tries to protect a flower as everything around him falls apart. As the flower crumbles to ashes, "annihilation" follows. Thematically, the entire visual correlates with the song's message. Scenes with sand slipping and rooms filled with abandoned toys and candy bars suggest themes of "dishonesty" and "disillusionment." In another scene, fire bursts in front of Suga, as he smirks in amusement and sits calmly while the fire grows. Jimin stands and stares ahead as water storms around him. The choreography depicted in the video consists of "sharp movements" and "dramatic poses" which portrays each member exhibiting the anguish of the song's lyrics. The clip also references to the band's previous thematic eras. A scene featuring V standing in front of a wall with the words "Save Me" written on it bears testimony to their "Wings" era. The visual ends with Jungkook returning eventually to a masked figure.

Papadatos of Digital Journal called the video "compelling from start to finish." In his review for Cosmopolitan, Alex Reed cited the clip as "wonderful" and said, "The styling is perfect, the vocals are on point, the choreography is exceptional, and the visuals are beyond." Anna Gaca from Spin deemed the visual as "glossy" and praised the "dramatic, CGI-enhanced" shots and the band's choreography. Reviewing for Celebmix, Ellie Nicholas labelled the video "intense, artistic and addicting," adding that it is "a masterpiece of a music video that you cannot help but replay." The clip was the most-watched music video on YouTube within 24 hours of 2018 upon release, achieving 35.9 million views on the platform on its first day, surpassing their own record of 22.3 million views with "DNA". It also became the third most watched music video within the first 24 hours in 2018. Within 8 days, "Fake Love" surpassed 100 million views besting the group's previous record with "DNA", which achieved the same in 24 days. As of November 2024, the visual has garnered over 1.3 billion views.

An accompanying music video for the remix version of "Fake Love", also directed by YongSeok Choi, was uploaded to Big Hit's YouTube channel on June 1, 2018. The visual introduces some "extended footage" while retaining the content of the original video. For its conclusion, Jungkook is joined by six hooded figures and closes out with the seven being crushed together by a wall.

== Live performances ==
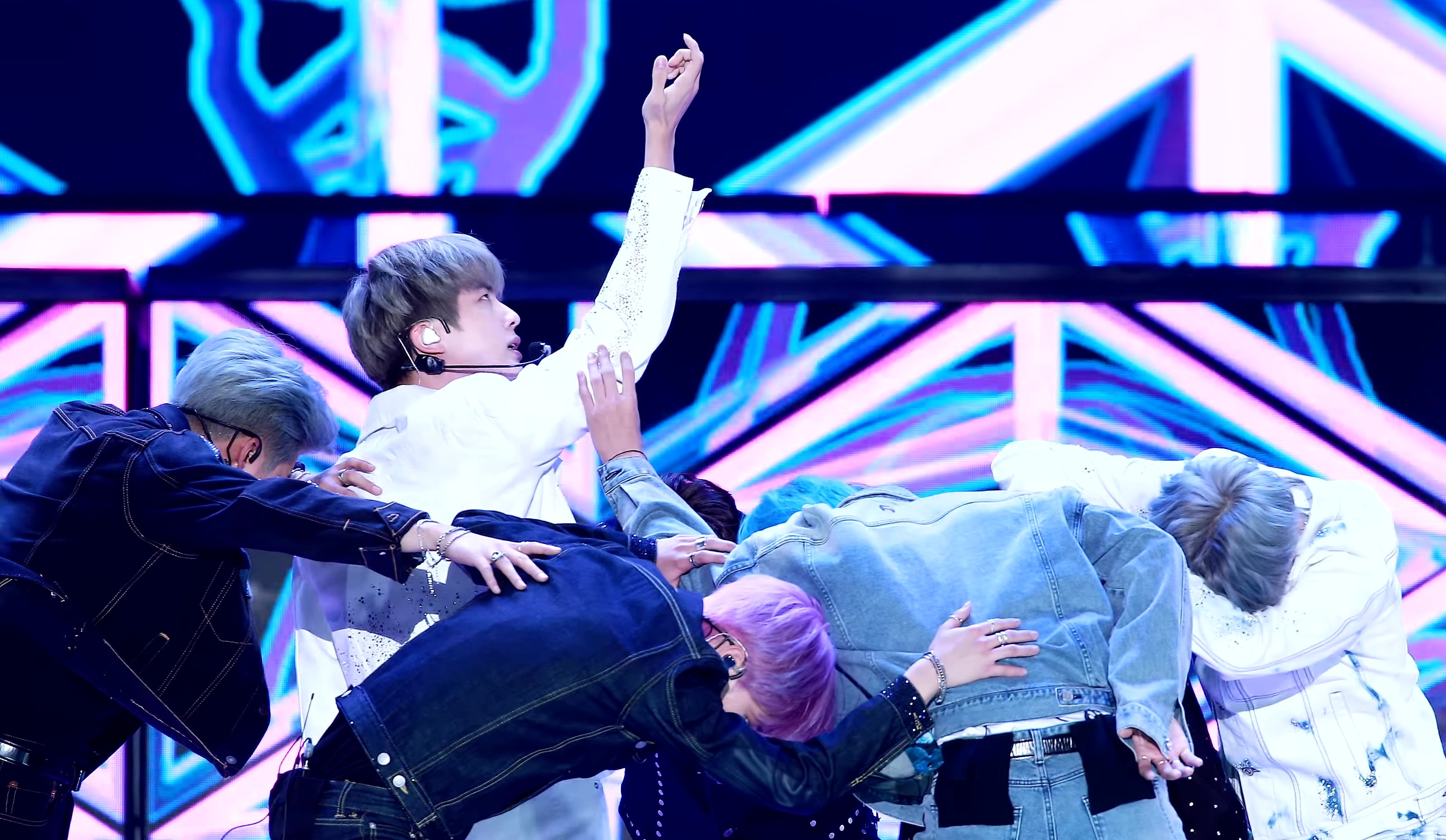
BTS performing "Fake Love" at Seoul Music Awards on January 15, 2019.

BTS performed "Fake Love" live for the first time at the 2018 Billboard Music Awards on May 20, 2018. The performance was acclaimed in the media. Taylor Weatherby of The Hollywood Reporter deemed the choreography as "intense" and "flawless" adding, "From high kicks to synchronized waves, BTS hit every move perfectly while singing their latest jam." Writing for Elle, Alyssa Bailey praised the performance writing, "the perfectly-synched dancing that was truly next-level." Jennifer Drysdale of Entertainment Tonight wrote that the band "slayed the performance with their intricate dance moves in front of a stunning display, completely stealing the show." The band performed the song on The Ellen DeGeneres Show on May 25, alongside "Airplane Pt. 2". On June 12, they gave a pre-recorded performance of the song on The Late Late Show with James Corden.

Following the release of Love Yourself: Tear, BTS appeared on several Korean music programs, including Mnet's M! Countdown, KBS's Music Bank, SBS's Inkigayo and MBC's Show! Music Core to promote "Fake Love" and the album. On December 1, 2018, BTS performed the song at the Melon Music Awards. The rock version of the song was promoted at the 2018 Mnet Asian Music Awards on December 12. They performed it again at the KBS Song Festival on December 29. On January 15, 2019, BTS performed the song at the Seoul Music Awards. "Fake Love" was included on the setlist of BTS' Love Yourself World Tour (2018–19).

== Track listing ==
Digital download / streaming – Korean version
No.	Title	Length
1.	"Fake Love"	4:02

Digital download / streaming – Rocking Vibe Remix
No.	Title	Length
1.	"Fake Love" (Rocking Vibe Remix)	3:58

Digital download / Regular CD Edition – Japanese version
No.	Title	Length
1.	"Fake Love"	4:03
2.	"Airplane Pt. 2"	3:39
3.	"Idol (Stadium Remix)"	4:13
4.	"Fake Love (Remix)"	4:04
Total length:		15:59

Limited Edition A (CD + DVD) – Japanese version
No.	Title	Length
1.	"Fake Love"	4:03
2.	"Airplane Pt. 2"	3:39
3.	"Idol (Stadium Remix)"	4:13
4.	"Fake Love (Remix)"	4:04
5.	"Airplane Pt. 2" (music video)
6.	"Fake Love" (music video)

Limited Edition B (CD + DVD) – Japanese version
No.	Title	Length
1.	"Fake Love"	4:03
2.	"Airplane Pt. 2"	3:39
3.	"Idol (Stadium Remix)"	4:13
4.	"Fake Love (Remix)"	4:04
5.	"Airplane Pt. 2" (making of music video)
6.	"Airplane Pt. 2" (making of jacket photos)

Limited Edition C (CD + Booklet) – Japanese version
No.	Title	Length
1.	"Fake Love"	4:03
2.	"Airplane Pt. 2"	3:39
3.	"Idol (Stadium Remix)"	4:13
4.	"Fake Love (Remix)"	4:04

== Credits and personnel ==
=== Korean and Japanese versions ===
Credits are adapted from the CD liner notes of Love Yourself: Tear and Tidal. (Note: All credits are for both Korean and Japanese versions of the song unless otherwise specified.)

- BTS – primary vocals
- "Hitman" Bang – songwriting
- RM – songwriting
- KM-Markit – songwriting, rap arrangement (Japanese version)
- Lee Taewook – guitar
- Jungkook – chorus
- Supreme Boi – chorus, digital editing
- Pdogg – production, songwriting, synthesizer, keyboard, digital editing, vocal arrangement, rap arrangement, record engineering
- Hiss noise – digital editing
- J.Pearl – digital editing (Japanese version)
- Jeong Wooyeong – record engineering
- James F. Reynolds – mix engineering

=== Rocking Vibe Remix ===
Credits are adapted from the CD liner notes of Love Yourself: Answer.

- BTS – primary vocals
- Slow Rabbit – production, keyboard, synthesizer, digital editing
- Pdogg – songwriting, vocal arrangement, rap arrangement, digital editing, recording engineer
- "Hitman" Bang – songwriting
- RM – songwriting
- Lee Taewook – guitar
- Lee Jooyeong – bass
- Jungkook – chorus
- Supreme Boi – chorus
- Hiss noise – digital editing
- Jeong Wooyeong – recording engineer
- Yang Ga – mix engineer

== Charts ==
=== Weekly charts ===
Weekly chart performance
Chart (2018)	Peak position
Argentina (Argentina Hot 100)	48
Australia (ARIA)	36
Austria (Ö3 Austria Top 40)	22
Belgium (Ultratip Bubbling Under Flanders)	34
Canada Hot 100 (Billboard)	22
Czech Republic Singles Digital (ČNS IFPI)	43
Estonia (Eesti Tipp-40)	6
France (SNEP)	116
Finland Digital Song Sales (Billboard)	1
Germany (GfK)	56
Hungary (Single Top 40)	1
Hungary (Stream Top 40)	13
Ireland (IRMA)	67
Japan (Japan Hot 100)	5
Japan (Japan Hot 100) Japanese ver.	1
Japan (Oricon) Fake Love/Airplane Pt. 2	1
Spanish Albums (PROMUSICAE) (Note: Appeared on the Spanish Albums chart in 2019, credited as a limited edition.) Japanese ver.	52
Malaysia (RIM)	1
Mexico Anglo (Monitor Latino)	18
Mexico Ingles Airplay (Billboard)	1
New Zealand (Recorded Music NZ)	35
Russia (Tophit)	40
Scottish Singles Sales (Official Charts)	36
Singapore (RIAS)	1
Slovakia Singles Digital (ČNS IFPI)	30
South Korea (Billboard Hot 100)	1
South Korea (Gaon)	1
Spain (Promusicae)	86
Sweden Digital Song Sales (Billboard)	2
Sweden (Sverigetopplistan)	54
Switzerland (Schweizer Hitparade)	41
UK Indie (Official Charts)	3
UK Singles (Official Charts)	42
US Billboard Hot 100	10
US Digital Song Sales (Billboard)	1
US Pop Airplay (Billboard)	34
US World Digital Songs (Billboard)	1

Weekly chart performance
Chart (2022)	Peak position
Vietnam (Vietnam Hot 100)	86

=== Monthly charts ===
Monthly chart performance
Chart (June 2018)	Position
South Korea (Gaon)	3

=== Year-end charts ===
2018 year-end chart positions for "Fake Love"
Chart (2018)	Position
Hungary (Single Top 40)	73
Japan (Japan Hot 100) Japanese ver.	13
Japan (Oricon) Japanese ver.	12
South Korea (Gaon)	19

2019 year-end chart position for "Fake Love"
Chart (2019)	Position
Japan (Japan Hot 100) Japanese ver.	96

== Certifications ==
Certifications
Region	Certification	Certified units/sales
Australia (ARIA)	Gold	35,000^{‡}
France (SNEP)	Gold	100,000^{‡}
Japan (RIAJ) Japanese version	2× Platinum	500,000^{^}
New Zealand (RMNZ)	Platinum	30,000^{‡}
South Korea (KMCA)	Platinum	2,500,000^{*}
United Kingdom (BPI)	Silver	200,000^{‡}
United States (RIAA)	Platinum	1,000,000^{‡}
Streaming
Japan (RIAJ)	Platinum	100,000,000^{†}
South Korea (KMCA)	Platinum	100,000,000^{†}
^{*} Sales figures based on certification alone.^{^} Shipments figures based on certification alone.^{‡} Sales+streaming figures based on certification alone.^{†} Streaming-only figures based on certification alone.

== Release history ==
Release dates and formats
Region	Date	Version	Format(s)	Label(s)	Ref.
Various	May 18, 2018	Original	Digital download; streaming	Big Hit	
Various	June 4, 2018	Remix	Digital download; streaming	Big Hit	
United States	June 12, 2018	Original	Contemporary hit radio	Columbia	
Various	October 16, 2018	Japanese	Digital download; streaming	Def Jam; Virgin	
Japan	November 7, 2018	Japanese	CD single	Def Jam; Virgin	
Japan	November 7, 2018	Japanese	CD + DVD	Def Jam; Virgin	
Japan	November 7, 2018	Japanese	CD + Booklet	Def Jam; Virgin	
United States	March 15, 2019	Japanese	CD	Big Hit; Columbia	

== See also ==
- List of Gaon Digital Chart number ones of 2018
- List of Hot 100 number-one singles of 2019 (Japan)
- List of K-pop Hot 100 number ones
- List of M Countdown Chart winners (2018)
- List of Oricon number-one singles of 2019
- List of number-one songs of 2018 (Malaysia)
- List of number-one songs of 2018 (Singapore)
