= BTS singles discography =

Singles recorded by South Korean boy band

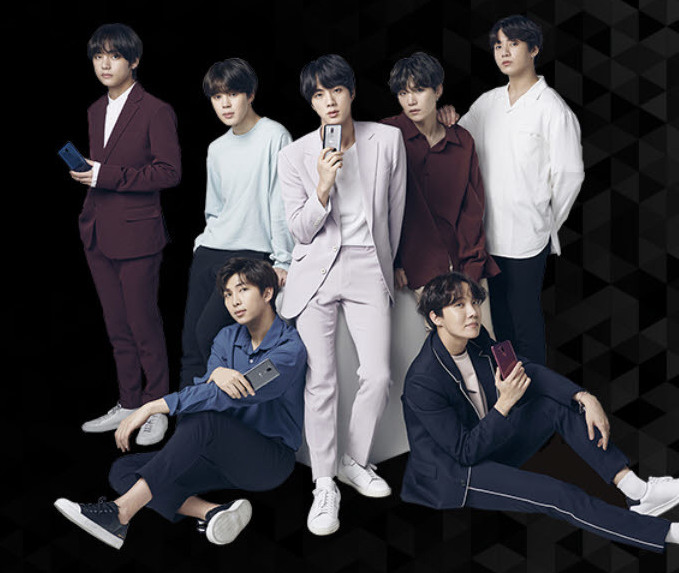
- BTS for LG Electronics in 2018
- As lead artist: 48
- As featured artist: 9
- Promotional singles: 3
- Other charted songs: 127

South Korean boy band BTS have released 48 singles as lead artist, including five soundtrack appearances; nine singles as a featured artist; three promotional singles; and over 100 other non-single songs. In Japan, according to Oricon and the Recording Industry Association of Japan (RIAJ), several of the band's singles are among the most-streamed songs of all time in the country and have set various other streaming and certification records that no other artist or group act in the history of either organization has. In the United States, according to Billboard, they had sold over 3.1 million tracks as of 2021, accounting for 72.3% of K-pop digital track sales, and achieved the second most number-one singles (after Taylor Swift's 9) of the 2020s decade with seven as of 2026. They are also the most-platinum certified Korean artist in the United States, according to the Recording Industry Association of America (RIAA).

BTS debuted in South Korea on June 13, 2013, with the single "No More Dream", which peaked at number 124 on the Gaon Digital Chart and sold 50,000 copies. To support their first extended play, O!RUL8,2?, the band released "N.O", which met with minor commercial success domestically. They released four singles in 2014, "Boy in Luv", "Just One Day", "Danger" and "War of Hormone", all of which entered the Digital Chart. "Boy in Luv" performed the best of the five and reached the top 50 of the chart—it sold over 200,000 copies by year's end.

"I Need U", released in April 2015, reached the top five of the Gaon Digital Chart, and peaked at number three on Billboard's World Digital Songs chart in the United States. BTS released two more singles in 2015, "Dope" and "Run"—the latter reached the top ten in South Korea. The band's fourth Japanese single, "For You", was released on June 17, 2015, and became its first number one hit in Japan, topping both the Oricon Singles Chart and Billboard Japan's Hot 100. The Japanese version of "I Need U" arrived in December 2015 and debuted at number one on the Singles Chart. A follow-up Japanese single, "Run", was released on March 15, 2016.

BTS scored their first number-one hit with "Blood Sweat & Tears" in late 2016, selling more than 1.5 million copies in South Korea and reaching number one on the US World Digital Songs chart. The single's Japanese version followed in May 2017 and became their first to be certified platinum by the RIAJ. The group released three other singles that year: "Spring Day", "Not Today", and "DNA". All three reached the top ten in South Korea and achieved first place on the World Digital Songs chart. "DNA" peaked at 67 on the US Hot 100. A remix of "Mic Drop" by American DJ Steve Aoki and rapper Desiigner was released in November 2017, reaching the top 40 of the Hot 100 and becoming the first song by a Korean boy group to be certified gold by the RIAA, in February 2018. The track was later certified platinum. A Japanese version of the single, including "DNA" and "Crystal Snow", was released in December 2017 and sold over 500,000 physical copies within a month, becoming the only record by a foreign artist to be certified double platinum by the RIAJ in 2017.

== As lead artist ==
=== 2010s ===
List of singles as lead artist, with selected chart positions, showing year released, sales, certifications, and album name
| Title | Year | Peak chart positions | | | | | | | | | | Sales (Note: Korean sales are paid digital downloads, previously provided weekly, monthly, and annually by the Gaon Music Chart. For songs released pre-2018, sales were reported monthly on Gaon's "Observation Board" upon reaching a specific milestone. In 2018, Gaon replaced detailed download and streaming numbers with the Gaon Digital Index. Sales were now based on digital sales certifications awarded by the KMCA. Japanese sales are physical and digital single sales provided by Oricon.) | Certifications (Note: In April 2018, the Korea Music Content Association introduced music recording certifications for albums and singles; pre-2018 releases are ineligible for certification.) | Album |
| Title | Year | KOR | KOR Billb. (Note: Includes the K-pop Hot 100 (discontinued between July 16, 2014 and June 4, 2017 and since April 30, 2022), the South Korea Songs chart (launched on May 7, 2022 and discontinued since January 18, 2025), and the Billboard Korea Hot 100 (launched on December 6, 2025).) | AUS | CAN | JPN | JPN Hot | NZ | UK | US | US World | Sales | Certifications | Album |
|---|---|---|---|---|---|---|---|---|---|---|---|---|---|---|
| "No More Dream" | 2013 | 124 | — | — | — | 8 | 6 | — | — | — (Note: "No More Dream" did not enter the Billboard Hot 100, but peaked at number 19 on the Digital Song Sales chart.) | 1 | KOR: 49,068; JPN: 41,346; US: 45,000 | —N/a | 2 Cool 4 Skool and Wake Up |
| "We Are Bulletproof Pt. 2" | 2013 | — | — | — | — | — | — | — | — | — | — | —N/a | —N/a | 2 Cool 4 Skool |
| "N.O" | 2013 | 92 | — | — | — | — | — | — | — | — | 7 | KOR: 42,952 | —N/a | O!RUL8,2? |
| "Boy in Luv" (상남자) | 2014 | 45 | — | — | — | 4 | 4 | — | — | — | 5 | KOR: 204,742; JPN: 49,000 | —N/a | Skool Luv Affair and Wake Up |
| "Just One Day" (하루만) | 2014 | 149 | — | — | — | — | — | — | — | — | 25 | KOR: 34,803; JPN: 1,550 | —N/a | Skool Luv Affair |
| "Danger" | 2014 | 58 | — | — | — | 5 | — | — | — | — (Note: "Danger" did not enter the Billboard Hot 100, but peaked at number 16 on the Digital Song Sales chart.) | 1 | KOR: 56,577; JPN: 58,811 | —N/a | Dark & Wild and Wake Up |
| "War of Hormone" (호르몬전쟁) | 2014 | 173 | — | — | — | — | — | — | — | — | 11 | KOR: 37,393 | —N/a | Dark & Wild |
| "I Need U" | 2015 | 5 | — | — | — | 3 | 4 | — | — | — | 3 | KOR: 830,333; JPN: 109,000; US: 98,000 | RIAJ: Gold; RIAJ: Gold (Note: Certification for streaming); RMNZ: Gold | The Most Beautiful Moment in Life, Pt. 1 and Youth |
| "For You" | 2015 | — | — | — | — | 1 | 1 | — | — | — | — | JPN: 84,000 | RIAJ: Gold | Youth |
| "Dope" (쩔어) | 2015 | 44 | — | — | — | — | — | — | — | — | 3 | KOR: 360,349; US: 100,000 | RIAJ: Gold (Note: Certification for streaming); RMNZ: Gold | The Most Beautiful Moment in Life, Part 1 |
| "Run" | 2015 | 8 | — | — | — | 2 | 2 | — | — | — | 3 | KOR: 623,482; JPN: 136,000 | RIAA: Platinum; RIAJ: Gold; RIAJ: Gold (Note: Certification for streaming); RMNZ: Gold; MC: Platinum | The Most Beautiful Moment in Life, Pt. 2 and Youth |
| "Epilogue: Young Forever" | 2016 | 29 | — | — | — | — | — | — | — | — | 3 | KOR: 103,724 | —N/a | The Most Beautiful Moment in Life: Young Forever |
| "Fire" (불타오르네) | 2016 | 7 | 93 | — | — | — | 30 | — | — | — | 1 | KOR: 856,373; US: 100,000 | RIAJ: Gold (Note: Certification for streaming); RMNZ: Gold | The Most Beautiful Moment in Life: Young Forever |
| "Save Me" | 2016 | 19 | — | — | — | — | — | — | — | — | 2 | KOR: 241,463; US: 92,000 | RIAA: Gold; RIAJ: Gold (Note: Certification for streaming); RMNZ: Gold | The Most Beautiful Moment in Life: Young Forever |
| "Blood Sweat & Tears" (피 땀 눈물) (original or Japanese version) | 2016 | 1 | 77 | — | 86 | 1 | 1 | — (Note: "Blood Sweat & Tears" did not enter the NZ Top 40 Singles Chart, but peaked at number seven on the NZ Heatseeker Singles Chart.) | — (Note: "Blood Sweat & Tears" did not enter the UK Singles Chart, but peaked at number 47 on the UK Independent Singles Chart.) | — | 1 | KOR: 2,500,000; JPN: 273,000; US: 97,000 | BPI: Silver; RIAA: Platinum; RIAJ: Gold (Note: Certification for streaming); RIAJ: Platinum; RMNZ: Gold | Wings |
| "Spring Day" (봄날) | 2017 | 1 | 28 | — | 100 | — | 38 | — (Note: "Spring Day" did not enter the NZ Top 40 Singles Chart, but peaked at number three on the NZ Heatseeker Singles Chart.) | — (Note: "Spring Day" did not enter the UK Singles Chart, but peaked at number 24 on the UK Independent Singles Chart.) | — (Note: "Spring Day" did not enter the Billboard Hot 100, but peaked at number 15 on the Bubbling Under Hot 100 chart.) | 1 | KOR: 5,000,000; JPN: 5,689; US: 14,000 | RIAA: Gold; RIAJ: Platinum (Note: Certification for streaming); RMNZ: Gold | You Never Walk Alone |
| "Not Today" | 2017 | 6 | — | — | 77 | — | 23 | — (Note: "Not Today" did not enter the NZ Top 40 Singles Chart, but peaked at number nine on the NZ Heatseeker Singles Chart.) | — (Note: "Not Today" did not enter the UK Singles Chart, but peaked at number 46 on the UK Independent Singles Chart.) | —— (Note: "Not Today" did not enter the Billboard Hot 100, but peaked at number 13 on the Digital Song Sales chart.) | 1 | KOR: 258,206; US: 12,000 | RIAJ: Gold | You Never Walk Alone |
| "DNA" (Korean or Japanese version) | 2017 | 2 | 1 | 99 | 47 | 1 | 5 | — (Note: "DNA" did not enter the NZ Top 40 Singles Chart, but peaked at number two on the NZ Heatseeker Singles Chart.) | 90 | 67 | 1 | KOR: 2,500,000; JPN: 401,000 (Note: Japanese maxi-single sales); US: 96,000 | ARIA: Gold; BPI: Silver; RIAA: Platinum; RIAJ: 2× Platinum (Note: Certification for streaming); RIAJ: 2× Platinum (Note: Certification for the Japanese maxi-single); RMNZ: Platinum | Love Yourself: Her |
| "Mic Drop" (original, Steve Aoki Remix featuring Desiigner, or Japanese version) | 2017 | 17 | 6 | 50 | 37 | 1 | 1 | — (Note: "MIC Drop" did not enter the NZ Top 40 Singles Chart, but peaked at number one on the NZ Heatseeker Singles Chart.) | 46 | 28 | 1 | KOR: 80,550; JPN: 401,000; US: 186,000 | ARIA: Gold; BPI: Silver; RIAA: Platinum; RIAJ: 2× Platinum; RMNZ: Gold | Love Yourself: Her |
| "Crystal Snow" | 2017 | 94 | — | — | — | 1 | 19 | — | — | — | 2 | JPN: 401,000; KOR: 31,543 (Note: digital sales of "Crystal Snow") | RIAJ: 2× Platinum; RIAJ: Gold (Note: Certification for streaming for "Crystal Snow") | Face Yourself |
| "Don't Leave Me" | 2018 | — (Note: "Don't Leave Me" did not enter the Gaon Digital Chart, but peaked at number 49 on the Gaon Download Chart.) | — | — | — | — (Note: "Don't Leave Me" did not enter the Oricon Singles Chart, but peaked at number 18 on the Oricon Digital Singles Chart.) | 10 | — | — | — | 1 | JPN: 4,611 (Dig.); US: 9,000 | RIAJ: Gold (Note: Certification for streaming) | Face Yourself |
| "Fake Love" (original or Japanese version) | 2018 | 1 | 1 | 36 | 22 | 1 | 5 | 35 | 42 | 10 | 1 | KOR: 2,500,000; US: 105,000 | KMCA: Platinum (Note: Certification for streaming) (Note: Certification for downloads); ARIA: Gold; BPI: Silver; RIAA: Platinum; RMNZ: Platinum | Love Yourself: Tear |
| "Idol" (solo or featuring Nicki Minaj) | 2018 | 1 | 1 | 35 | 5 (Note: The version featuring Nicki Minaj charted at number five on the Canadian Hot 100.) | — | 11 | — (Note: "Idol" did not enter the NZ Top 40 Singles Chart, but peaked at number two on the NZ Hot Singles Chart.) | 21 | 11 | 1 | KOR: 2,500,000 | KMCA: Platinum (Note: Certification for streaming); ARIA: Gold; BPI: Silver; RIAA: Platinum; RIAJ: Platinum (Note: Certification for streaming); RMNZ: Gold | Love Yourself: Answer |
| "Airplane Pt. 2" (original or Japanese version) | 2018 | 37 | 8 | — | — | 1 | 25 | — | — (Note: "Airplane Pt. 2" did not enter the UK Official Singles Chart, but peaked at number 40 on the Independent Singles and Album Charts) | — | 4 | JPN: 481,000 | RIAJ: 2× Platinum; RIAJ: Platinum (Note: Certification for streaming); RMNZ: Gold | Love Yourself: Tears |
| "Boy with Luv" (작은 것들을 위한 시) (featuring Halsey) (original or Japanese version) | 2019 | 1 | 1 | 10 | 7 | — | 7 | 12 | 13 | 8 | 1 | KOR: 2,500,000; AUS: 2,825; US: 81,000 | KMCA: 3× Platinum; KMCA: Platinum (Note: Certification for downloads); ARIA: Platinum; BPI: Gold; MC: Gold; RIAA: Platinum; RIAJ: Silver (Note: Boy With Luv (Japanese version) certification for streaming); RIAJ: Platinum (Note: Original Korean version certification for streaming); RMNZ: Platinum | Map of the Soul: Persona |
| "Dream Glow" (with Charli XCX) | 2019 | 75 | 74 | 77 | — (Note: "Dream Glow" did not enter the Canadian Hot 100, but peaked at number 17 on the Canadian Digital Song Sales chart.) | — | — | — (Note: "Dream Glow" did not enter the NZ Top 40 Singles Chart, but peaked at number 7 on the NZ Hot Singles Chart.) | 61 | — (Note: "Dream Glow" did not enter the Billboard Hot 100, but peaked at number six on the Bubbling Under Hot 100 chart.) | 1 | —N/a | —N/a | BTS World |
| "A Brand New Day" (with Zara Larsson) | 2019 | 103 | 93 | — | — (Note: "A Brand New Day" did not enter the Canadian Hot 100, but peaked at number 30 on the Canadian Digital Song Sales chart.) | — | — | — (Note: "A Brand New Day" did not enter the NZ Top 40 Singles Chart, but peaked at number 19 on the NZ Hot Singles Chart.) | — | —— (Note: "A Brand New Day" did not enter the Billboard Hot 100, but peaked at number 25 on the Digital Song Sales chart.) | 1 | —N/a | —N/a | BTS World |
| "All Night" (with Juice Wrld) | 2019 | 102 | 92 | — | — (Note: "All Night" did not enter the Canadian Hot 100, but peaked at number 36 on the Canadian Digital Song Sales chart.) | — | — | — (Note: "All Night" did not enter the NZ Top 40 Singles Chart, but peaked at number 17 on the NZ Hot Singles Chart.) | — | — (Note: "All Night" did not enter the Billboard Hot 100, but peaked at number 18 on the Bubbling Under Hot 100 chart.) | 1 | —N/a | —N/a | BTS World |
| "Heartbeat" | 2019 | 62 | 2 | — (Note: "Heartbeat" did not enter the ARIA Singles Chart, but peaked at number 32 on the ARIA Digital Track Chart.) | 83 | — | — | — (Note: "Heartbeat" did not enter the NZ Top 40 Singles Chart, but peaked at number 19 on the NZ Hot Singles Chart.) | — | — (Note: "Heartbeat" did not enter the Billboard Hot 100, but peaked at number seven on the Bubbling Under Hot 100 chart.) | 1 | —N/a | —N/a | BTS World |
| "Lights" | 2019 | — | — | — | — (Note: "Lights" did not enter the Canadian Hot 100, but peaked at number 48 on the Canadian Digital Song Sales chart.) | 1 | 1 | — (Note: "Lights" did not enter the NZ Top 40 Singles Chart, but peaked at number 10 on the NZ Hot Singles Chart.) | — | —— (Note: "Lights" did not enter the Billboard Hot 100, but peaked at number 18 on the Digital Song Sales chart.) | 1 | JPN: 765,997 (Note: Physical single sales); KOR: 4,333 (Note: Physical single sales) | RIAJ: Million | Non-album single |
| "Make It Right" (solo or featuring Lauv) | 2019 | 10 | 3 | 53 | 65 | — | 54 | — (Note: "Make It Right" did not enter the NZ Top 40 Singles Chart, but peaked at number three on the NZ Hot Singles Chart.) | — | 76 | 1 | —N/a | ARIA: Gold; RIAJ: Gold (Note: Certification for streaming) | Map of the Soul: Persona |
"—" denotes releases that did not chart or were not released in that region.

=== 2020s ===
List of singles as lead artist, with selected chart positions, showing year released, sales, certifications, and album name
| Title | Year | Peak chart positions | | | | | | | | | | Sales | Certifications | Album |
| Title | Year | KOR | KOR Billb. | AUS | CAN | JPN Dig. | JPN Hot | NZ | UK | US | WW | Sales | Certifications | Album |
|---|---|---|---|---|---|---|---|---|---|---|---|---|---|---|
| "Black Swan" | 2020 | 7 | 4 | 87 | 63 | — | 31 | — (Note: "Black Swan" did not enter the NZ Top 40 Singles Chart, but peaked at number seven on the NZ Hot Singles Chart.) | 46 | 57 | — (Note: "Black Swan" did not enter the Billboard Global 200, but peaked at number one on the World Digital Song Sales chart.) | US: 24,000 | RIAA: Gold; RIAJ: Gold (Note: Certification for streaming); RMNZ: Gold | Map of the Soul: 7 |
| "On" | 2020 | 1 | 1 | 29 | 18 | — | 8 | — (Note: "On" did not enter the NZ Top 40 Singles Chart, but peaked at number four on the NZ Hot Singles Chart.) | 21 | 4 | — (Note: "On" did not enter the Global 200 chart, but peaked at number one on the World Digital Song Sales chart.) | US: 86,000; KOR: 34,484 | KMCA: Platinum; ARIA: Gold; BPI: Silver; RIAA: Gold; RIAJ: Gold (Note: Certification for streaming); RMNZ: Gold | Map of the Soul: 7 |
| "Stay Gold" | 2020 | — (Note: "Stay Gold" did not enter the Gaon Digital Chart, but peaked at number 52 on the Gaon Download Chart.) | — | — | — (Note: "Stay Gold" did not enter the Canadian Hot 100, but peaked at number 15 on the Canadian Digital Song Sales chart.) | 6 | 12 | — | — | — (Note: "Stay Gold" did not enter the Billboard Hot 100, but peaked at number nine on the Bubbling Under Hot 100 chart.) | — (Note: "Stay Gold" did not enter the Global 200 chart, but peaked at number 181 on the Billboard Global Excl. US chart.) | JPN: 24,651 (Dig.); US: 10,000 | RIAJ: 2× Platinum (Note: Certification for streaming); RIAJ: Gold (Note: Certification for digital sales) | Map of the Soul: 7 – The Journey |
| "Your Eyes Tell" | 2020 | — (Note: "Your Eyes Tell" did not enter the Gaon Digital Chart, but peaked at number 72 on the Gaon Download Chart.) | — | — | — (Note: "Your Eyes Tell" did not enter the Canadian Hot 100, but peaked at number 18 on the Canadian Digital Song Sales chart.) | 5 | 8 | — | — (Note: "Your Eyes Tell" did not enter the Billboard Hot 100, but peaked at number 12 on the Digital Song Sales chart.) | — | — (Note: "Your Eyes Tell" did not enter the Global 200 chart, but peaked at number one on the World Digital Song Sales chart.) | JPN: 17,223 (Dig.); US: 8,000 | RIAJ: Platinum (Note: Certification for streaming) | Map of the Soul: 7 – The Journey |
| "Dynamite" | 2020 | 1 | 1 | 2 | 2 | 2 | 2 | 4 | 3 | 1 | 1 | JPN: 250,737 (Dig.); UK: 22,000; US: 1,568,000 | KMCA: 2× Platinum; ARIA: 2× Platinum; BPI: Platinum; MC: 5× Platinum; RIAA: 5× Platinum; RIAJ: 2× Platinum (Note: Certification for digital sales); RIAJ: Diamond (Note: Certification for streaming); RMNZ: 3× Platinum | Be |
| "Life Goes On" | 2020 | 3 | 2 | 27 | 8 | 23 | 10 | 33 | 10 | 1 | 1 | US: 150,000 | KMCA: Platinum (Note: Certification for streaming); RIAA: Gold; RIAJ: Platinum (Note: Certification for streaming); RMNZ: Gold | Be |
| "Film Out" | 2021 | — (Note: "Film Out" did not enter the Gaon Digital Chart, but peaked at number 30 on the Gaon Download Chart.) | — | — | 79 | 1 | 2 | — (Note: "Film Out" did not enter the NZ Top 40 Singles Chart, but peaked at number five on the NZ Hot Singles Chart.) | 73 | 81 | 5 | JPN: 54,266 (Dig.) | RIAJ: Gold (Note: Certification for streaming) | Signal the Movie: Cold Case Investigation Unit OST and BTS, the Best |
| "Butter" | 2021 | 1 | 1 | 6 | 2 | 1 | 1 | 6 | 3 | 1 | 1 | JPN: 196,980 (Dig.); US: 1,890,000 | KMCA: Platinum (Note: Certification for streaming); BPI: Gold; MC: 3× Platinum; RIAJ: Platinum (Note: Certification for digital sales); RIAJ: Diamond (Note: Certification for streaming); RIAA: 2× Platinum; RMNZ: Platinum | Non-album singles |
| "Permission to Dance" | 2021 | 2 | 1 | 6 | 10 | 1 | 1 | 8 | 16 | 1 | 1 | JPN: 115,068 (Dig.); US: 404,000 | BPI: Silver; RIAA: Gold; RIAJ: Gold (Note: Certification for digital sales); RIAJ: 3× Platinum (Note: Certification for streaming); RMNZ: Gold | Non-album singles |
| "My Universe" (with Coldplay) | 2021 | 2 | — | 7 | 9 | 1 | 3 | 17 | 3 | 1 | 1 | JPN: 21,151; US: 287,000; KOR: 4,966 | ARIA: Platinum; BPI: Platinum; MC: 2× Platinum; RIAA: Platinum; RIAJ: Platinum (Note: Certification for streaming); RMNZ: 2× Platinum | Music of the Spheres |
| "Yet to Come (The Most Beautiful Moment)" | 2022 | 4 | 1 | 17 | 16 | 2 | 1 | 24 | 27 | 13 | 2 | JPN: 21,579 (Dig.); WW: 42,000 | RIAJ: Platinum (Note: Certification for streaming) | Proof |
| "Bad Decisions" (with Benny Blanco and Snoop Dogg) | 2022 | 82 | 24 | 31 | 31 | 5 | 33 | — (Note: "Bad Decisions" did not enter the NZ Top 40 Singles Chart, but peaked at number three on the NZ Hot Singles Chart.) | 53 | 10 | 6 | JPN: 13,669 (Dig.); US: 66,000; WW: 40,000 | —N/a | Non-album single |
| "The Planet" | 2023 | 77 | — | — | — (Note: "The Planet" did not enter the Canadian Hot 100, but peaked at number 17 on the Canadian Digital Song Sales chart.) | 2 | 40 | — (Note: "The Planet" did not enter the NZ Top 40 Singles Chart, but peaked at number eight on the NZ Hot Singles Chart.) | — | — (Note: "The Planet" did not enter the Billboard Hot 100, but peaked at number six on the Digital Songs chart.) | 62 | JPN: 19,169 | —N/a | Bastions OST |
| "Take Two" | 2023 | 11 | 23 | 60 | 49 | 2 | 6 | — (Note: "Take Two" did not enter the NZ Top 40 Singles Chart, but peaked at number four on the NZ Hot Singles Chart.) | 59 | 48 | 1 | JPN: 38,570 (Dig.); WW: 64,000 | —N/a | Non-album single |
| "Swim" | 2026 | 1 | 1 | 4 | 5 | 2 | 3 | 8 | 2 | 1 | 1 | US: 256,000 | AFP: Gold; BPI: Silver; MC: Platinum; RMNZ: Gold | Arirang |
| "Hooligan" | 2026 | 16 | 8 | 46 | 32 | — | 28 | 37 | — | 35 | 3 | —N/a | —N/a | Arirang |
| "Normal" | 2026 | 95 | 35 | 59 | 33 | — | 49 | — | 36 | 33 | 4 | —N/a | —N/a | Arirang |
"—" denotes releases that did not chart or were not released in that region.

== As featured artist ==
List of singles as featured artist, with selected chart positions, showing year released, sales, certifications, and album name
| Title | Year | Peak chart positions | | | | | | | | | | Sales | Certifications | Album |
| Title | Year | KOR | AUS | CAN | GER | IRE | JPN Hot | NZ | SCO | UK | US | Sales | Certifications | Album |
|---|---|---|---|---|---|---|---|---|---|---|---|---|---|---|
| "Ashes" (재) (Lim Jeong-hee featuring BTS) | 2010 | — | — | — | — | — | — | — | — | — | — | —N/a | —N/a | It Can't Be Real |
| "Love U, Hate U" (2AM featuring BTS) | 2010 | 86 | — | — | — | — | — | — | — | — | — | —N/a | —N/a | Saint o'Clock |
| "Bad Girl" (Lee Hyun featuring BTS and GLAM) | 2011 | — | — | — | — | — | — | — | — | — | — | —N/a | —N/a | You Are the Best of My Life |
| "Because I'm a Foolish Woman" (바보같은 여자라) (Kan Mi-youn featuring BTS) | 2011 | — | — | — | — | — | — | — | — | — | — | —N/a | —N/a | Watch |
| "Song to Make You Smile" (널 웃게 할 노래) (Lee Seung-gi featuring BTS and Hareem) | 2011 | 36 | — | — | — | — | — | — | — | — | — | KOR: 329,031 | —N/a | Tonight |
| "Waste It on Me" (Steve Aoki featuring BTS) | 2018 | 80 | 61 | 64 | 98 | 63 | 19 | — (Note: "Waste It on Me" did not enter the NZ Top 40 Singles Chart, but peaked at number six on the NZ Hot Singles Chart.) | 28 | 57 | 89 | US: 27,000 | MC: Platinum; RIAA: Gold | Neon Future III |
| "Who" (Lauv featuring BTS) | 2020 | 113 | — | — (Note: "Who" did not enter the Canadian Hot 100, but peaked at number 24 on the Canadian Digital Song Sales chart.) | — | — | — | — (Note: "Who" did not enter the NZ Top 40 Singles Chart, but peaked at number 11 on the NZ Hot Singles Chart.) | — | — | — (Note: "Who" did not enter the Billboard Hot 100, but peaked at number 14 on the Digital Song Sales chart.) | —N/a | —N/a | How I'm Feeling |
| "Savage Love (Laxed – Siren Beat) (BTS Remix)" (Jawsh 685, Jason Derulo and BTS) | 2020 | 6 | — | 2 | — | — | 73 | — (Note: "Savage Love (Laxed – Siren Beat) [BTS Remix]" did not enter the NZ Top 40 Singles Chart, but peaked at number nine on the NZ Hot Singles Chart.) | — | — | 1 | —N/a | KMCA: Platinum (Note: Certification for streaming); RIAJ: Gold (Note: Certification for streaming) | Non-album single |
"—" denotes releases that did not chart or were not released in that region.

== Promotional singles ==
List of promotional singles, with selected chart positions, showing year released, sales, and album name
| Title | Year | Peak | | | | | | | | Sales | Album |
| Title | Year | KOR | AUS | CAN | JPN Hot | NZ Hot | UK | US | WW | Sales | Album |
|---|---|---|---|---|---|---|---|---|---|---|---|
| "Come Back Home" | 2017 | 21 | — | — | — | — | — | — | — | KOR: 52,128 | Seo Taiji 25 Project |
| "With Seoul" | 2017 | — | — | — | — | — | — | — | — | —N/a | Non-album single |
| "Come Over" | 2026 | 85 | 79 | 66 | 19 | 6 | 52 | 69 | 14 | —N/a | Arirang (Deluxe) |

== Other charted and certified songs ==
=== 2010s ===
List of other charted songs, with selected chart positions, showing year released, sales, certifications, and album name
| Title | Year | Peak chart positions | | | | | | | | Sales | Certifications | Album |
| Title | Year | KOR | KOR Billb. | AUS | CAN | JPN Hot | NZ Hot | US | US World | Sales | Certifications | Album |
|---|---|---|---|---|---|---|---|---|---|---|---|---|
| "Like" (좋아요) | 2013 | — (Note: "I Like It" did not enter the Gaon Digital Chart, but peaked at number 247 on the Gaon Download Chart.) | — | — | — | — | — | — | 10 | KOR: 10,700; US: 18,000 | —N/a | 2 Cool 4 Skool |
| "Intro: 2 Cool 4 Skool" | 2013 | — | — | — | — | — | — | — | 18 | US: 1,000 | —N/a | 2 Cool 4 Skool |
| "Interlude" | 2013 | — | — | — | — | — | — | — | 22 | —N/a | —N/a | 2 Cool 4 Skool |
| "Skit: Circle Room Talk" | 2013 | — | — | — | — | — | — | — | 23 | —N/a | —N/a | 2 Cool 4 Skool |
| "Outro: Circle Room Cypher" | 2013 | — | — | — | — | — | — | — | 24 | —N/a | —N/a | 2 Cool 4 Skool |
| "Attack On Bangtan" (진격의 방탄) | 2013 | — | — | — | — | — | — | — | 1 | —N/a | —N/a | O!RUL8,2? |
| "Where You From" (어디에서 왔는지) | 2014 | 156 | — | — | — | — | — | — | — | KOR: 11,950 | —N/a | Skool Luv Affair |
| "Tomorrow" | 2014 | 180 | — | — | — | — | — | — | 24 | KOR: 6,808 | —N/a | Skool Luv Affair |
| "Jump" | 2014 | 190 | — | — | — | — | — | — | — | KOR: 6,320 | —N/a | Skool Luv Affair |
| "Miss Right" | 2014 | 43 | — | — | — | — | — | — | — | KOR: 67,954 | —N/a | Skool Luv Affair Special Addition |
| "Rain" | 2014 | 162 | — | — | — | — | — | — | — | KOR: 12,220 | —N/a | Dark & Wild |
| "Blanket Kick" (이불킥) | 2014 | 163 | — | — | — | — | — | — | — | KOR: 12,164 | —N/a | Dark & Wild |
| "Let Me Know" | 2014 | 175 | — | — | — | — | — | — | — | KOR: 10,338 | —N/a | Dark & Wild |
| "24/7=Heaven" | 2014 | 175 | — | — | — | — | — | — | 9 | KOR: 10,505 | —N/a | Dark & Wild |
| "Look Here" (여기 봐) | 2014 | 178 | — | — | — | — | — | — | — | KOR: 10,370 | —N/a | Dark & Wild |
| "Would You Turn Off Your Cellphone?" (핸드폰 좀 꺼줄래) | 2014 | 182 | — | — | — | — | — | — | — | KOR: 10,158 | —N/a | Dark & Wild |
| "2nd Grade" (2학년) | 2014 | 192 | — | — | — | — | — | — | — | KOR: 9,350 | —N/a | Dark & Wild |
| "Hip Hop Lover" (힙합성애자) | 2014 | 196 | — | — | — | — | — | — | — | KOR: 9,102 | —N/a | Dark & Wild |
| "BTS Cypher Pt. 3: Killer" (featuring Supreme Boi) | 2014 | 199 | — | — | — | — | — | — | 3 | KOR: 8,707 | —N/a | Dark & Wild |
| "Hold Me Tight" (잡아줘) | 2015 | 59 | — | — | — | — | — | — | 12 | KOR: 50,941 | —N/a | The Most Beautiful Moment in Life, Part 1 |
| "Converse High" | 2015 | 70 | — | — | — | — | — | — | 15 | KOR: 42,309 | —N/a | The Most Beautiful Moment in Life, Part 1 |
| "Boyz with Fun" (흥탄소년단) | 2015 | 80 | — | — | — | — | — | — | 13 | KOR: 33,096 | —N/a | The Most Beautiful Moment in Life, Part 1 |
| "Outro: Love Is Not Over" | 2015 | 98 | — | — | — | — | — | — | 25 | KOR: 24,796 | —N/a | The Most Beautiful Moment in Life, Part 1 |
| "Moving On" (이사) | 2015 | 102 | — | — | — | — | — | — | — | KOR: 25,996 | —N/a | The Most Beautiful Moment in Life, Part 1 |
| "Intro: The Most Beautiful Moment in Life" | 2015 | 110 | — | — | — | — | — | — | — | KOR: 22,056 | —N/a | The Most Beautiful Moment in Life, Part 1 |
| "Skit: Expectation!" | 2015 | 128 | — | — | — | — | — | — | — | KOR: 15,095 | —N/a | The Most Beautiful Moment in Life, Part 1 |
| "Butterfly" | 2015 | 15 | — | — | — | — | — | — | 4 | KOR: 115,630 | —N/a | The Most Beautiful Moment in Life, Part 2 |
| "Whalien 52" | 2015 | 31 | — | — | — | — | — | — | 14 | KOR: 83,432 | —N/a | The Most Beautiful Moment in Life, Part 2 |
| "Autumn Leaves" (고엽) | 2015 | 35 | — | — | — | — | — | — | 10 | KOR: 76,029 | —N/a | The Most Beautiful Moment in Life, Part 2 |
| "Ma City" | 2015 | 36 | — | — | — | — | — | — | 1 | KOR: 74,542 | —N/a | The Most Beautiful Moment in Life, Part 2 |
| "Silver Spoon" (뱁새) | 2015 | 44 | — | — | — | — | — | — | 8 | KOR: 58,494; UK: 6,000 | —N/a | The Most Beautiful Moment in Life, Part 2 |
| "Outro: House of Cards" | 2015 | 47 | — | — | — | — | — | — | 11 | KOR: 52,230 | —N/a | The Most Beautiful Moment in Life, Part 2 |
| "Intro: Never Mind" | 2015 | 50 | — | — | — | — | — | — | 19 | KOR: 44,443 | —N/a | The Most Beautiful Moment in Life, Part 2 |
| "Skit: One Night in a Strange City" | 2015 | 74 | — | — | — | — | — | — | — | KOR: 32,799 | —N/a | The Most Beautiful Moment in Life, Part 2 |
| "Butterfly (Prologue Mix)" | 2016 | 57 | — | — | — | — | — | — | — | KOR: 44,247 | —N/a | The Most Beautiful Moment in Life: Young Forever |
| "Love Is Not Over" | 2016 | 60 | — | — | — | — | — | — | 10 | KOR: 44,984 | —N/a | The Most Beautiful Moment in Life: Young Forever |
| "House of Cards" | 2016 | 61 | — | — | — | — | — | — | 9 | KOR: 44,225 | —N/a | The Most Beautiful Moment in Life: Young Forever |
| "Run (Ballad Mix)" | 2016 | 68 | — | — | — | — | — | — | — | KOR: 38,314 | —N/a | The Most Beautiful Moment in Life: Young Forever |
| "I Need U (Urban Mix)" | 2016 | 97 | — | — | — | — | — | — | — | KOR: 31,423 | —N/a | The Most Beautiful Moment in Life: Young Forever |
| "I Need U (Remix)" | 2016 | 122 | — | — | — | — | — | — | — | KOR: 25,720 | —N/a | The Most Beautiful Moment in Life: Young Forever |
| "Butterfly (Alternative Mix)" | 2016 | 162 | — | — | — | — | — | — | — | KOR: 23,873 | —N/a | The Most Beautiful Moment in Life: Young Forever |
| "Run (Alternative Mix)" | 2016 | 128 | — | — | — | — | — | — | — | KOR: 23,391 | —N/a | The Most Beautiful Moment in Life: Young Forever |
| "Lie" (Jimin solo) | 2016 | 19 | — | — | — | — | — | — | 3 | KOR: 129,428 | —N/a | Wings |
| "Stigma" (V solo) | 2016 | 26 | — | — | — | — | — | — (Note: "Stigma" did not enter the Billboard Hot 100, but peaked at number 22 on the Digital Song Sales chart.) | 1 | KOR: 110,898 | —N/a | Wings |
| "Begin" (Jungkook solo) | 2016 | 27 | — | — | — | — | — | — (Note: "Begin" did not enter the Billboard Hot 100, but peaked at number 23 on the Digital Song Sales chart.) | 1 | KOR: 90,526 | —N/a | Wings |
| "Lost" | 2016 | 28 | — | — | — | — | — | — | 11 | KOR: 126,846 | —N/a | Wings |
| "21st Century Girl" | 2016 | 29 | — | — | — | — | — | — (Note: "21st Century Girl" did not enter the Billboard Hot 100, but peaked at number 15 on the Digital Song Sales chart.) | 2 | KOR: 129,884 | —N/a | Wings |
| "Awake" (Jin solo) | 2016 | 31 | — | — | — | — | — | — | 6 | KOR: 105,382 | —N/a | Wings |
| "First Love" (Suga solo) | 2016 | 32 | — | — | — | — | — | — | 8 | KOR: 103,240 | —N/a | Wings |
| "2! 3!" (둘! 셋! (그래도 좋은 날이 더 많기를)) | 2016 | 34 | — | — | — | — | — | — (Note: "2! 3!" did not enter the Billboard Hot 100, but peaked at number 42 on the Digital Song Sales chart.) | 1 | KOR: 116,773 | —N/a | Wings |
| "Am I Wrong" | 2016 | 35 | — | — | — | — | — | — | 14 | KOR: 118,474 | —N/a | Wings |
| "Mama" (J-Hope solo) | 2016 | 37 | — | — | — | — | — | — | 13 | KOR: 97,929 | —N/a | Wings |
| "Reflection" (RM solo) | 2016 | 38 | — | — | — | — | — | — | — | KOR: 82,068 | —N/a | Wings |
| "BTS Cypher 4" | 2016 | 39 | — | — | — | — | — | — | 6 | KOR: 103,656 | —N/a | Wings |
| "Intro: Boy Meets Evil" | 2016 | 40 | — | — | — | — | — | — | 9 | KOR: 69,618 | —N/a | Wings |
| "Interlude: Wings" | 2016 | 43 | — | — | — | — | — | — | 24 | KOR: 55,318 | —N/a | Wings |
| "A Supplementary Story: You Never Walk Alone" | 2017 | 15 | — | — | — | — | — | — | 3 | KOR: 87,532; US: 8,000 | —N/a | You Never Walk Alone |
| "Outro: Wings" | 2017 | 19 | — | — | — | — | — | — | 4 | KOR: 78,261; US: 6,000 | —N/a | You Never Walk Alone |
| "Best of Me" | 2017 | 7 | 86 | — | — | 73 | — | — | 3 | KOR: 298,321 | RIAJ: Gold (Note: Certification for streaming) | Love Yourself: Her |
| "Dimple" (보조개) | 2017 | 10 | — | — | — | — | — | — | 4 | KOR: 158,239 | RIAJ: Gold (Note: Certification for streaming); RMNZ: Gold | Love Yourself: Her |
| "Pied Piper" | 2017 | 13 | — | — | — | — | — | — | 8 | KOR: 126,775 | —N/a | Love Yourself: Her |
| "Go (Go Go)" (고민보다) | 2017 | 14 | 2 | — | — | 58 | — | — | 6 | KOR: 434,749 | RIAJ: Gold (Note: Certification for streaming) | Love Yourself: Her |
| "Mic Drop" | 2017 | 17 | — | — | — | — | — | — | 7 | KOR: 337,136 | RIAJ: Gold (Note: Certification for streaming) | Love Yourself: Her |
| "Intro: Serendipity" | 2017 | 18 | — | — | — | — | — | — | 2 | KOR: 114,128 | —N/a | Love Yourself: Her |
| "Outro: Her" | 2017 | 21 | — | — | — | — | — | — | 10 | KOR: 104,635 | —N/a | Love Yourself: Her |
| "Skit: Billboard Music Awards Speech" | 2017 | 34 | — | — | — | — | — | — | — | KOR: 55,944 | —N/a | Love Yourself: Her |
| "Let Go" | 2018 | — | — | — | — | 40 | — | — | 2 | —N/a | RIAJ: Platinum (Note: Certification for streaming) | Face Yourself |
| "Intro: Ringwanderung" | 2018 | — | — | — | — | — | — | — | 4 | —N/a | —N/a | Face Yourself |
| "Outro: Crack" | 2018 | — | — | — | — | — | — | — | 5 | —N/a | —N/a | Face Yourself |
| "The Truth Untold" (전하지 못한 진심) (featuring Steve Aoki) | 2018 | 7 | 2 | 100 | — | — | — | — | 2 | —N/a | RIAJ: Gold (Note: Certification for streaming); RMNZ: Gold | Love Yourself: Tear |
| "134340" | 2018 | 25 | 4 | — | — | — | — | — | 11 | —N/a | —N/a | Love Yourself: Tear |
| "Paradise" (낙원) | 2018 | 23 | 3 | — | — | — | — | — | 8 | —N/a | —N/a | Love Yourself: Tear |
| "Love Maze" | 2018 | 28 | 5 | — | — | — | — | — | 7 | —N/a | RIAJ: Gold (Note: Certification for streaming) | Love Yourself: Tear |
| "Magic Shop" | 2018 | 32 | 6 | — | — | — | — | — | 6 | JPN: 1,103; US: 18,000 | RIAJ: Gold (Note: Certification for streaming) | Love Yourself: Tear |
| "Anpanman" | 2018 | 22 | 5 | — | — | 33 | — | — | 1 | —N/a | RIAJ: Gold (Note: Certification for streaming); RMNZ: Gold | Love Yourself: Tear |
| "Airplane Pt. 2" | 2018 | 35 | 6 | — | — | 52 | — | — | 4 | —N/a | —N/a | Love Yourself: Tear |
| "So What" | 2018 | 44 | 9 | — | — | — | — | — | 9 | —N/a | —N/a | Love Yourself: Tear |
| "Intro: Singularity" | 2018 | 54 | 10 | — | — (Note: "Intro: Singularity" did not enter the Canadian Hot 100, but peaked at number 40 on the Canadian Digital Song Sales chart.) | 34 | — | — (Note: "Singularity" did not enter the Billboard Hot 100, but peaked at number 44 on the Digital Song Sales chart.) | 3 | —N/a | —N/a | Love Yourself: Tear |
| "Outro: Tear" | 2018 | 65 | 11 | — | — | — | — | — | 10 | JPN: 2,365 | —N/a | Love Yourself: Tear |
| "Fake Love (Rocking Vibe Mix)" | 2018 | 61 | — | — | — | — | — | — | — | —N/a | —N/a | Love Yourself: Answer |
| "Euphoria" (Jungkook solo) | 2018 | 11 | 2 | — | 86 | 76 | 9 | — (Note: "Euphoria" did not enter the Billboard Hot 100, but peaked at number five on the Bubbling Under Hot 100 Singles chart.) | 1 | US: 15,000 | RIAJ: Gold (Note: Certification for streaming); RMNZ: Gold | Love Yourself: Answer |
| "I'm Fine" | 2018 | 14 | 3 | — | 75 | 36 | 12 | — (Note: "I'm Fine" did not enter the Billboard Hot 100, but peaked at number seven on the Bubbling Under Hot 100 Singles chart.) | 3 | US: 14,000 | RIAJ: Gold (Note: Certification for streaming) | Love Yourself: Answer |
| "Answer: Love Myself" | 2018 | 24 | 4 | — | — (Note: "Answer: Love Myself" did not enter the Canadian Hot 100, but peaked at number 30 on the Canadian Digital Song Sales chart.) | — | — | — (Note: "Answer: Love Myself" did not enter the Billboard Hot 100, but peaked at number 24 on the Digital Song Sales chart.) | 6 | US: 10,000 | RIAJ: Gold (Note: Certification for streaming) | Love Yourself: Answer |
| "Epiphany" (Jin solo) | 2018 | 30 | 5 | — | — (Note: "Epiphany" did not enter the Canadian Hot 100, but peaked at number 28 on the Canadian Digital Song Sales chart.) | — | — | — (Note: "Epiphany" did not enter the Billboard Hot 100, but peaked at number 19 on the Digital Song Sales chart.) | 4 | US: 10,000 | —N/a | Love Yourself: Answer |
| "Trivia 起: Just Dance" (J-Hope solo) | 2018 | 42 | 6 | — | — (Note: "Trivia: Just Dance" did not enter the Canadian Hot 100, but peaked at number 33 on the Canadian Digital Song Sales chart.) | — | — | — (Note: "Trivia 起: Just Dance" did not enter the Billboard Hot 100, but peaked at number 25 on the Digital Song Sales chart.) | 7 | US: 10,000 | —N/a | Love Yourself: Answer |
| "Trivia 轉: Seesaw" (Suga solo) | 2018 | 39 | 6 | — | — (Note: "Trivia: Seesaw" did not enter the Canadian Hot 100, but peaked at number 31 on the Canadian Digital Song Sales chart.) | — | 15 | — (Note: "Trivia 轉: Seesaw" did not enter the Billboard Hot 100, but peaked at number 22 on the Bubbling Under Hot 100 Singles chart.) | 5 | US: 11,000 | —N/a | Love Yourself: Answer |
| "Trivia 承: Love" (RM solo) | 2018 | 56 | 8 | — | — (Note: "Trivia: Love" did not enter the Canadian Hot 100, but peaked at number 37 on the Canadian Digital Song Sales chart.) | — | — | — (Note: "Trivia 承: Love" did not enter the Billboard Hot 100, but peaked at number 31 on the Digital Song Sales chart.) | 9 | US: 10,000 | —N/a | Love Yourself: Answer |
| "Serendipity" (Full-length edition) (Jimin solo) | 2018 | 77 | 9 | — | — (Note: "Serendipity" did not enter the Canadian Hot 100, but peaked at number 39 on the Canadian Digital Song Sales chart.) | — | — | — (Note: "Serendipity" did not enter the Billboard Hot 100, but peaked at number 29 on the Digital Song Sales chart.) | 8 | US: 10,000 | —N/a | Love Yourself: Answer |
| "Mikrokosmos" (소우주) | 2019 | 8 | 2 | 92 | 79 | 53 | 6 | — (Note: "Mikrokosmos" did not enter the Billboard Hot 100, but peaked at number two on the Bubbling Under Hot 100 chart.) | 3 | US: 11,600 | RIAJ: Gold (Note: Certification for streaming) | Map of the Soul: Persona |
| "Home" | 2019 | 16 | 4 | 99 | 75 | 69 | 10 | — (Note: "Home" did not enter the Billboard Hot 100, but peaked at number one on the Bubbling Under Hot 100 chart.) | 1 | US: 8,700 | | Map of the Soul: Persona |
| "Jamais Vu" | 2019 | 17 | 5 | — | 95 | 95 | — | — (Note: "Jamais Vu" did not enter the Billboard Hot 100, but peaked at number 14 on the Bubbling Under Hot 100 chart.) | 6 | US: 7,100 | | Map of the Soul: Persona |
| "Dionysus" | 2019 | 21 | 6 | — | 88 | 65 | — | — (Note: "Dionysus" did not enter the Billboard Hot 100, but peaked at number 11 on the Bubbling Under Hot 100 chart.) | 5 | US: 7,800 | RIAJ: Gold (Note: Certification for streaming) | Map of the Soul: Persona |
| "Intro: Persona" | 2019 | 34 | 7 | — | — (Note: "Intro: Persona" did not enter the Canadian Hot 100, but peaked at number 40 on the Canadian Digital Song Sales chart.) | — | — | — (Note: "Intro: Persona" did not enter the Billboard Hot 100, but peaked at number 34 on the Digital Song Sales chart.) | 7 | US: 6,800 | —N/a | Map of the Soul: Persona |
"—" denotes releases that did not chart or were not released in that region.

=== 2020s ===
List of other charted songs, with selected chart positions, showing year released, sales, certifications, and album name
| Title | Year | Peak chart positions | | | | | | | | | | Sales | Certifications | Album |
| Title | Year | KOR | KOR Billb. | AUS | CAN | JPN Hot | NZ | NZ Hot | US | US World | WW | Sales | Certifications | Album |
|---|---|---|---|---|---|---|---|---|---|---|---|---|---|---|
| "00:00 (Zero O'Clock)" | 2020 | 6 | 6 | — | — (Note: "00:00 (Zero O'Clock)" did not enter the Canadian Hot 100, but peaked at number 24 on the Canadian Digital Song Sales chart.) | — | — | — | — (Note: "00:00 (Zero O'Clock)" did not enter the Billboard Hot 100, but peaked at number 21 on the Bubbling Under Hot 100 chart.) | 2 | — | —N/a | RIAJ: Gold (Note: Certification for streaming) | Map of the Soul: 7 |
| "Filter" | 2020 | 15 | 9 | — | 88 | — | — | 10 | 87 | 1 | — | US: 22,000 | —N/a | Map of the Soul: 7 |
| "Friends" (친구) | 2020 | 13 | 7 | — | — (Note: "Friends" did not enter the Canadian Hot 100, but peaked at number 23 on the Canadian Digital Song Sales chart.) | — | — | — | — (Note: "Friends" did not enter the Billboard Hot 100, but peaked at number 16 on the Bubbling Under Hot 100 chart.) | — | — | US: 12,000 | RIAJ: Gold (Note: Certification for Streaming) | Map of the Soul: 7 |
| "My Time" (시차) | 2020 | 21 | 17 | — | — (Note: "My Time" did not enter the Canadian Hot 100, but peaked at number 20 on the Canadian Digital Song Sales chart.) | — | — | 12 | 84 | 1 | — | US: 24,000 | —N/a | Map of the Soul: 7 |
| "Inner Child" | 2020 | 24 | 19 | — | — (Note: "Inner Child" did not enter the Canadian Hot 100, but peaked at number 30 on the Canadian Digital Song Sales chart.) | — | — | — | — (Note: "Inner Child" did not enter the Billboard Hot 100, but peaked at number 23 on the Bubbling Under Hot 100 chart.) | 1 | — | US: 11,000 | —N/a | Map of the Soul: 7 |
| "Moon" | 2020 | 22 | 12 | — | — (Note: "Moon" did not enter the Canadian Hot 100, but peaked at number 19 on the Canadian Digital Song Sales chart.) | — | — | — | — (Note: "Moon" did not enter the Billboard Hot 100, but peaked at number 17 on the Digital Song Sales chart.) | 2 | — | —N/a | —N/a | Map of the Soul: 7 |
| "Ugh!" (욱) | 2020 | 34 | 21 | — | — (Note: "Ugh!" did not enter the Canadian Hot 100, but peaked at number 27 on the Canadian Digital Song Sales chart.) | — | — | 14 | — (Note: "Ugh!" did not enter the Billboard Hot 100, but peaked at number seven on the Bubbling Under Hot 100 chart.) | 2 | — | —N/a | —N/a | Map of the Soul: 7 |
| "Louder Than Bombs" | 2020 | 36 | 24 | — | — (Note: "Louder Than Bombs" did not enter the Canadian Hot 100, but peaked at number 19 on the Canadian Digital Song Sales chart.) | — | — | — | — (Note: "Louder Than Bombs" did not enter the Billboard Hot 100, but peaked at number six on the Bubbling Under Hot 100 chart.) | 2 | — | US: 11,000 | —N/a | Map of the Soul: 7 |
| "We Are Bulletproof: The Eternal" | 2020 | 38 | 22 | — | — (Note: "We Are Bulletproof: The Eternal" did not enter the Canadian Hot 100, but peaked at number 16 on the Canadian Digital Song Sales chart.) | — | — | — | — (Note: "We Are Bulletproof: The Eternal" did not enter the Billboard Hot 100, but peaked at number 20 on the Bubbling Under Hot 100 chart.) | 2 | — | US: 11,000 | —N/a | Map of the Soul: 7 |
| "Respect" | 2020 | 47 | 28 | — | — (Note: "Respect" did not enter the Canadian Hot 100, but peaked at number 44 on the Canadian Digital Song Sales chart.) | — | — | — | — (Note: "Respect" did not enter the Billboard Hot 100, but peaked at number 26 on the Digital Song Sales chart.) | 12 | — | —N/a | —N/a | Map of the Soul: 7 |
| "Interlude: Shadow" | 2020 | 48 | 31 | — | — (Note: "Interlude: Shadow" did not enter the Canadian Hot 100, but peaked at number 32 on the Canadian Digital Song Sales chart.) | — | — | — | — (Note: "Interlude: Shadow" did not enter the Billboard Hot 100, but peaked at number 19 on the Digital Song Sales chart.) | 11 | — | —N/a | —N/a | Map of the Soul: 7 |
| "Outro: Ego" | 2020 | 51 | 32 | — | — (Note: "Outro: Ego" did not enter the Canadian Hot 100, but peaked at number 34 on the Canadian Digital Song Sales chart.) | — | — | — | — (Note: "Outro: Ego" did not enter the Billboard Hot 100, but peaked at number 21 on the Digital Song Sales chart.) | 11 | — | —N/a | —N/a | Map of the Soul: 7 |
| "Boy with Luv" (featuring Halsey) | 2020 | 155 | — | — | — | — | — | — | — | — | — | —N/a | —N/a | Map of the Soul: 7 |
| "Dynamite (Instrumental)" | 2020 | — (Note: "Dynamite (Instrumental)" did not enter the Gaon Digital Chart, but peaked at number 16 on the Gaon Download Chart.) | — | — | — | — | — | — | — | — | — | —N/a | —N/a | Dynamite (DayTime Version) |
| "Dynamite (Acoustic Remix)" | 2020 | 178 | — | — | — | — | — | — | — | — | — | —N/a | —N/a | Dynamite (DayTime Version) |
| "Dynamite (EDM Remix)" | 2020 | — (Note: "Dynamite (EDM Remix)" did not enter the Gaon Digital Chart, but peaked at number 22 on the Gaon Download Chart.) | — | — | — | — | — | — | — | — | — | —N/a | —N/a | Dynamite (DayTime Version) |
| "Dynamite (Tropical Remix)" | 2020 | — (Note: "Dynamite (Tropical Remix)" did not enter the Gaon Digital Chart, but peaked at number 94 on the Gaon Download Chart.) | — | — | — | — | — | — | — | — | — | —N/a | —N/a | Dynamite (DayTime Version) |
| "Dynamite (Poolside Remix)" | 2020 | — (Note: "Dynamite (Poolside Remix)" did not enter the Gaon Digital Chart, but peaked at number 115 on the Gaon Download Chart.) | — | — | — | — | — | — | — | — | — | —N/a | —N/a | Dynamite (DayTime Version) |
| "Blue & Grey" | 2020 | 24 | 6 | — | 64 | 52 | — | 7 | 13 | 2 | 9 | —N/a | RIAJ: Gold (Note: Certification for Streaming) | Be |
| "Fly to My Room" (내 방을 여행하는 법) | 2020 | 22 | 14 | — | 65 | 42 | — | 8 | 69 | 6 | 22 | —N/a | —N/a | Be |
| "Telepathy" (잠시) | 2020 | 38 | 17 | — | 70 | 76 | — | 10 | 70 | 4 | 28 | —N/a | —N/a | Be |
| "Stay" | 2020 | 43 | 20 | — | 76 | 85 | — | — | 22 | 1 | 16 | —N/a | —N/a | Be |
| "Dis-ease" (병) | 2020 | 48 | 22 | — | 73 | 86 | — | — | 72 | 5 | 30 | —N/a | —N/a | Be |
| "Skit" | 2020 | 87 | 36 | — | — | — | — | — | — | — | — | —N/a | —N/a | Be |
| "Dynamite (Holiday Remix)" | 2020 | 110 | — | — | — | — | — | — | — | — | — | —N/a | —N/a | Non-album song |
| "Butter (Instrumental)" | 2021 | — (Note: "Butter (Instrumental)" did not enter the Gaon Digital Chart, but peaked at number 30 on the Gaon Download Chart.) | — | — | — | — | — | — | — | — | — | —N/a | —N/a | Butter (Hotter, Sweeter, Cooler) |
| "Butter (Hotter Remix)" | 2021 | — (Note: "Butter (Hotter Remix)" did not enter the Gaon Digital Chart, but peaked at number 50 on the Gaon Download Chart.) | — | — | — | — | — | 30 | — | — | — | —N/a | —N/a | Butter (Hotter, Sweeter, Cooler) |
| "Butter (Sweeter Remix)" | 2021 | — (Note: "Butter (Sweeter Remix)" did not enter the Gaon Digital Chart, but peaked at number 80 on the Gaon Download Chart.) | — | — | — | — | — | — | — | — | — | —N/a | —N/a | Butter (Hotter, Sweeter, Cooler) |
| "Butter (Cooler Remix)" | 2021 | — (Note: "Butter (Cooler Remix)" did not enter the Gaon Digital Chart, but peaked at number 79 on the Gaon Download Chart.) | — | — | — | — | — | — | — | — | — | —N/a | —N/a | Butter (Hotter, Sweeter, Cooler) |
| "Permission to Dance (Instrumental)" | 2021 | — (Note: "Permission to Dance (Instrumental)" did not enter the Gaon Digital Chart, but peaked at number 40 on the Gaon Download Chart.) | — | — | — | — | — | — | — | — | — | —N/a | —N/a | Butter / Permission to Dance |
| "Permission to Dance (R&B Remix)" | 2021 | — (Note: "Permission to Dance (R&B Remix)" did not enter the Gaon Digital Chart, but peaked at number 38 on the Gaon Download Chart.) | — | — | — | — | — | — | — | — | — | —N/a | —N/a | Non-album songs |
| "Butter (Megan Thee Stallion Remix)" | 2021 | 200 | — | — | — | — | 27 | 9 | — | — | 3 | —N/a | —N/a | Non-album songs |
| "My Universe (Instrumental)" (with Coldplay) | 2021 | — (Note: "My Universe (Instrumental)" did not enter the Gaon Digital Chart, but peaked at number 155 on the Gaon Download Chart.) | — | — | — | — | — | — | — | — | — | —N/a | —N/a | Non-album songs |
| "My Universe (Acoustic Version)" (with Coldplay) | 2021 | — (Note: "My Universe (Acoustic Version)" did not enter the Gaon Digital Chart, but peaked at number 180 on the Gaon Download Chart.) | — | — | — | — | — | — | — | — | — | —N/a | —N/a | Non-album songs |
| "My Universe (Supernova 7 Mix)" (with Coldplay) | 2021 | — (Note: "My Universe (Supernova 7 Mix)" did not enter the Gaon Digital Chart, but peaked at number 187 on the Gaon Download Chart.) | — | — | — | — | — | — | — | — | — | —N/a | —N/a | Non-album songs |
| "My Universe (Suga's Remix)" (with Coldplay) | 2021 | — (Note: "My Universe (Suga's Remix)" did not enter the Gaon Digital Chart, but peaked at number 124 on the Gaon Download Chart.) | — | — | — | — | — | — | — | — | — | —N/a | —N/a | Non-album songs |
| "Butter (Holiday Remix)" | 2021 | — (Note: "Butter (Holiday Remix)" did not enter the Gaon Digital Chart, but peaked at number 40 on the Gaon Download Chart.) | 35 | — | — | — | — | — | — | — | — | —N/a | —N/a | Non-album songs |
| "Born Singer" | 2022 | 54 | — | — | — (Note: "Born Singer" did not enter the Canadian Hot 100, but peaked at number 10 on the Canadian Digital Song Sales chart.) | 65 | — | 10 | — (Note: "Born Singer" did not enter the Billboard Hot 100, but peaked at number 21 on the Bubbling Under Hot 100 chart.) | 4 | 36 | —N/a | —N/a | Proof |
| "Run BTS" (달려라 방탄) | 2022 | 84 | — | 63 | 49 | 39 | — | 6 | 73 | 1 | 12 | WW: 19,000 | RIAJ: Gold (Note: Certification for Streaming) | Proof |
| "For Youth" | 2022 | 88 | — | — | — (Note: "For Youth" did not enter the Canadian Hot 100, but peaked at number 7 on the Canadian Digital Song Sales chart.) | 67 | — | 9 | — (Note: "For Youth" did not enter the Billboard Hot 100, but peaked at number 10 on the Bubbling Under Hot 100 chart.) | 3 | 30 | —N/a | —N/a | Proof |
| "On" (live) | 2025 | — (Note: "On" (live) did not enter the Circle Digital Chart, but peaked at number 130 on the Circle Download Chart.) | — | — | — | — | — | — | — | 2 | — | —N/a | —N/a | Permission to Dance on Stage – Live |
| "Fire" (live) | 2025 | — (Note: "Fire" (live) did not enter the Circle Digital Chart, but peaked at number 134 on the Circle Download Chart.) | — | — | — | — | — | — | — | 3 | — | —N/a | —N/a | Permission to Dance on Stage – Live |
| "Dope" (live) | 2025 | — (Note: "Dope" (live) did not enter the Circle Digital Chart, but peaked at number 141 on the Circle Download Chart.) | — | — | — | — | — | — | — | 5 | — | —N/a | —N/a | Permission to Dance on Stage – Live |
| "DNA" (live) | 2025 | — (Note: "DNA" (live) did not enter the Circle Digital Chart, but peaked at number 135 on the Circle Download Chart.) | — | — | — | — | — | — | — | 8 | — | —N/a | —N/a | Permission to Dance on Stage – Live |
| "Blue & Grey" (live) | 2025 | — (Note: "Blue & Grey" (live) did not enter the Circle Digital Chart, but peaked at number 133 on the Circle Download Chart.) | — | — | — | — | — | — | — | 4 | — | —N/a | —N/a | Permission to Dance on Stage – Live |
| "Black Swan" (live) | 2025 | — (Note: "Black Swan" (live) did not enter the Circle Digital Chart, but peaked at number 144 on the Circle Download Chart.) | — | — | — | — | — | — | — | 6 | — | —N/a | —N/a | Permission to Dance on Stage – Live |
| "Blood Sweat & Tears" (live) | 2025 | — (Note: "Blood Sweat & Tears" (live) did not enter the Circle Digital Chart, but peaked at number 138 on the Circle Download Chart.) | — | — | — | — | — | — | — | 9 | — | —N/a | —N/a | Permission to Dance on Stage – Live |
| "Fake Love" (live) | 2025 | — (Note: "Fake Love" (live) did not enter the Circle Digital Chart, but peaked at number 139 on the Circle Download Chart.) | — | — | — | — | — | — | — | 7 | — | —N/a | —N/a | Permission to Dance on Stage – Live |
| "Life Goes On" (live) | 2025 | — (Note: "Life Goes On" (live) did not enter the Circle Digital Chart, but peaked at number 142 on the Circle Download Chart.) | — | — | — | — | — | — | — | 10 | — | —N/a | —N/a | Permission to Dance on Stage – Live |
| "Boy With Luv" (live) (featuring Halsey) | 2025 | — (Note: "Boy With Luv" (live) did not enter the Circle Digital Chart, but peaked at number 137 on the Circle Download Chart.) | — | — | — | — | — | — | — | — | — | —N/a | —N/a | Permission to Dance on Stage – Live |
| "Dynamite" (live) | 2025 | — (Note: "Dynamite" (live) did not enter the Circle Digital Chart, but peaked at number 145 on the Circle Download Chart.) | — | — | — | — | — | — | — | — | — | —N/a | —N/a | Permission to Dance on Stage – Live |
| "Butter" (live) | 2025 | — (Note: "Butter" (live) did not enter the Circle Digital Chart, but peaked at number 154 on the Circle Download Chart.) | — | — | — | — | — | — | — | — | — | —N/a | —N/a | Permission to Dance on Stage – Live |
| "Telepathy" (live) | 2025 | — (Note: "Telepathy" (live) did not enter the Circle Digital Chart, but peaked at number 156 on the Circle Download Chart.) | — | — | — | — | — | — | — | — | — | —N/a | —N/a | Permission to Dance on Stage – Live |
| "Outro: Wings" (live) | 2025 | — (Note: "Outro: Wings" (live) did not enter the Circle Digital Chart, but peaked at number 155 on the Circle Download Chart.) | — | — | — | — | — | — | — | — | — | —N/a | —N/a | Permission to Dance on Stage – Live |
| "Stay" (live) | 2025 | — (Note: "Stay" (live) did not enter the Circle Digital Chart, but peaked at number 160 on the Circle Download Chart.) | — | — | — | — | — | — | — | — | — | —N/a | —N/a | Permission to Dance on Stage – Live |
| "So What" (live) | 2025 | — (Note: "So What" (live) did not enter the Circle Digital Chart, but peaked at number 158 on the Circle Download Chart.) | — | — | — | — | — | — | — | — | — | —N/a | —N/a | Permission to Dance on Stage – Live |
| "Idol" (live) | 2025 | — (Note: "Idol" (live) did not enter the Circle Digital Chart, but peaked at number 152 on the Circle Download Chart.) | — | — | — | — | — | — | — | — | — | —N/a | —N/a | Permission to Dance on Stage – Live |
| "Airplane Pt. 2" (live) | 2025 | — (Note: "Airplane Pt. 2" (live) did not enter the Circle Digital Chart, but peaked at number 165 on the Circle Download Chart.) | — | — | — | — | — | — | — | — | — | —N/a | —N/a | Permission to Dance on Stage – Live |
| "Silver Spoon" (live) | 2025 | — (Note: "Silver Spoon" (live) did not enter the Circle Digital Chart, but peaked at number 161 on the Circle Download Chart.) | — | — | — | — | — | — | — | — | — | —N/a | —N/a | Permission to Dance on Stage – Live |
| "Dis-ease" (live) | 2025 | — (Note: "Dis-ease" (live) did not enter the Circle Digital Chart, but peaked at number 164 on the Circle Download Chart.) | — | — | — | — | — | — | — | — | — | —N/a | —N/a | Permission to Dance on Stage – Live |
| "Spring Day" (live) | 2025 | — (Note: "Spring Day" (live) did not enter the Circle Digital Chart, but peaked at number 143 on the Circle Download Chart.) | — | — | — | — | — | — | — | — | — | —N/a | —N/a | Permission to Dance on Stage – Live |
| "Permission to Dance" (live) | 2025 | — (Note: "Permission to Dance" (live) did not enter the Circle Digital Chart, but peaked at number 92 on the Circle Download Chart.) | — | — | — | — | — | — | — | 1 | — | —N/a | —N/a | Permission to Dance on Stage – Live |
| "Body to Body" | 2026 | 4 | 3 | 26 | 20 | 17 | 27 | 2 | 25 | — | 2 | —N/a | MC: Gold | Arirang |
| "Aliens" | 2026 | 23 | 11 | 63 | 37 | 44 | — | — | 47 | 1 | 6 | —N/a | —N/a | Arirang |
| "Fya" | 2026 | 20 | 9 | 48 | 34 | 39 | 39 | 4 | 36 | — | 4 | —N/a | —N/a | Arirang |
| "2.0" | 2026 | 31 | 20 | 66 | 41 | 10 | — | — | 50 | — | 8 | —N/a | MC: Gold | Arirang |
| "No. 29" | 2026 | 97 | 36 | — | — | 95 | — | — | — | — | — | —N/a | —N/a | Arirang |
| "Merry Go Round" | 2026 | 34 | 18 | 69 | 43 | 55 | — | — | 52 | — | 9 | —N/a | —N/a | Arirang |
| "Like Animals" | 2026 | 25 | 15 | 65 | 38 | 66 | — | — | 53 | — | 7 | —N/a | —N/a | Arirang |
| "They Don't Know 'Bout Us" | 2026 | 50 | 32 | 74 | 45 | 75 | — | — | 56 | — | 11 | —N/a | —N/a | Arirang |
| "One More Night" | 2026 | 47 | 33 | 86 | 48 | 62 | — | — | 61 | 3 | 15 | —N/a | —N/a | Arirang |
| "Please" | 2026 | 52 | 34 | 89 | 49 | 77 | — | — | 63 | 2 | 17 | —N/a | —N/a | Arirang |
| "Into the Sun" | 2026 | 72 | 36 | — | 52 | 84 | — | — | 68 | — | 19 | —N/a | —N/a | Arirang |
| "Swim (Instrumental)" | 2026 | — (Note: "Swim (Instrumental)" did not enter the Circle Digital Chart, but peaked at number 130 on the Circle Download Chart.) | — | — | — | — | — | — | — | — | — | —N/a | —N/a | Keep Swimming |
| "Swim with RM (Chill Hip Hop Remix)" | 2026 | — (Note: "Swim with RM (Chill Hip Hop Remix)" did not enter the Circle Digital Chart, but peaked at number 104 on the Circle Download Chart.) | — | — | — | — | — | — | — | — | — | —N/a | —N/a | Keep Swimming |
| "Swim with Jin (Alternative Rock Remix)" | 2026 | — (Note: "Swim with Jin (Alternative Rock Remix)" did not enter the Circle Digital Chart, but peaked at number 73 on the Circle Download Chart.) | — | — | — | — | — | — | — | — | — | —N/a | —N/a | Keep Swimming |
| "Swim with Suga (Melodic Techno Remix)" | 2026 | — (Note: "Swim with Suga (Melodic Techno Remix)" did not enter the Circle Digital Chart, but peaked at number 105 on the Circle Download Chart.) | — | — | — | — | — | — | — | — | — | —N/a | —N/a | Keep Swimming |
| "Swim with J-Hope (Afrobeat Remix)" | 2026 | — (Note: "Swim with J-Hope (Afrobeat Remix)" did not enter the Circle Digital Chart, but peaked at number 111 on the Circle Download Chart.) | — | — | — | — | — | — | — | — | — | —N/a | —N/a | Keep Swimming |
| "Swim with Jimin (Slow Jam R&B Remix)" | 2026 | — (Note: "Swim with Jimin (Slow Jam R&B Remix)" did not enter the Circle Digital Chart, but peaked at number 87 on the Circle Download Chart.) | — | — | — | — | — | — | — | — | — | —N/a | —N/a | Keep Swimming |
| "Swim with V (Electronic Remix)" | 2026 | — (Note: "Swim with V (Electronic Remix)" did not enter the Circle Digital Chart, but peaked at number 85 on the Circle Download Chart.) | — | — | — | — | — | — | — | — | — | —N/a | —N/a | Keep Swimming |
| "Swim with Jung Kook (Acoustic Lofi Remix)" | 2026 | — (Note: "Swim with Jung Kook (Acoustic Lofi Remix)" did not enter the Circle Digital Chart, but peaked at number 81 on the Circle Download Chart.) | — | — | — | — | — | — | — | — | — | —N/a | —N/a | Keep Swimming |
| "Swim (Underwater Remix)" | 2026 | — (Note: "Swim (Underwater Remix)" did not enter the Circle Digital Chart, but peaked at number 196 on the Circle Download Chart.) | — | — | — | — | — | — | — | — | — | —N/a | —N/a | Non-album song |
| "Normal (Korean Ver.)" | 2026 | — (Note: "Normal (Korean Ver.) (Explicit Ver.)" did not enter the Circle Digital Chart, but peaked at number 27 on the Circle Download Chart.) | — | — | — | — | — | — | — | — | — | —N/a | —N/a | Normal EP |
| "Normal (Korean Ver.) (Clean Ver.)" | 2026 | — (Note: "Normal (Korean Ver.) (Clean Ver.)" did not enter the Circle Digital Chart, but peaked at number 34 on the Circle Download Chart.) | — | — | — | — | — | — | — | — | — | —N/a | —N/a | Normal EP |
| "Normal (Instrumental)" | 2026 | — (Note: "Normal (Instrumental)" did not enter the Circle Digital Chart, but peaked at number 124 on the Circle Download Chart.) | — | — | — | — | — | — | — | — | — | —N/a | —N/a | Normal EP |
"—" denotes releases that did not chart or were not released in that region.

== Other collaborations ==
| Title | Year | Members | Other artist(s) | Sales |
|---|---|---|---|---|
| "Perfect Christmas" | 2013 | RM, Jungkook | Jo Kwon, Lim Jeong Hee, Joo Hee of 8eight | KOR: 64,789 |
| "Danger (MO-BLUE-MIX)" | 2014 | All | (Thanh Bui) | —N/a |
