= World Digital Song Sales =

Weekly record chart published by Billboard magazine

The World Digital Song Sales chart (formerly World Digital Songs) was a weekly record chart compiled by Nielsen SoundScan and published by Billboard magazine. Established in 2010—its first issue was dated January 23—as one of 21 genre-specific song charts launched by Billboard that year, it originally ranked the 25 best-selling digital singles in the World Music genre, but was reduced to 15 entries in November 2021, then 10 entries effective the issue dated October 28, 2023.

Hawaiian singer-songwriter and musician Israel Kamakawiwoʻole's recording of "Somewhere Over the Rainbow" was the first song to rank at number one on the chart. It dominated the ranking for its early existence, spending 375 cumulative weeks at the top, including a 116-week run at number one from the chart's inception until April 2012. The song appeared on 856 issues of the chart, excluding one issue for the week dated June 25, 2022. Another notable chart-topper is Psy's "Gangnam Style", which stands in second place for most weeks at number one with a total of 50 weeks between 2012 and 2014, and for total weeks on the chart, with 381. Over the years, many other K-pop artists appeared on the chart, with some reaching the top position. BTS, who earned their first number-one on the chart with "Fire" in 2016, achieved a record 44 number-one singles. Blackpink accumulated nine number-one singles, the most of any female artist on the chart.

Billboard discontinued the World Digital Songs Sales chart in 2026. The final song to rank at number-one was "Come Over" by BTS, on the issue dated June 27.

== List of number-one songs ==
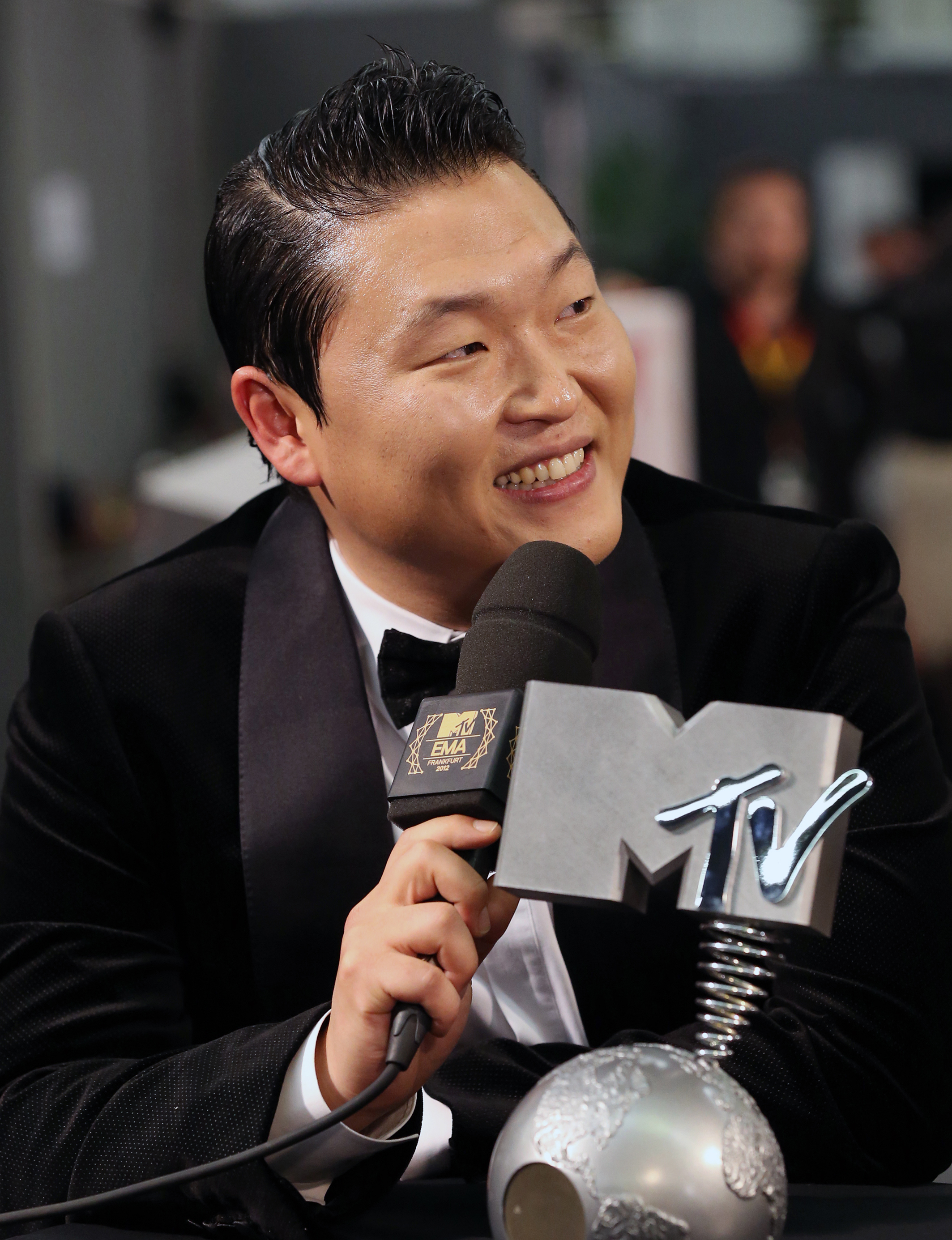
Since he first entered the World Digital Song Sales chart in 2013, Psy has achieved five number-one singles and spent 63 non-consecutive weeks atop the ranking.

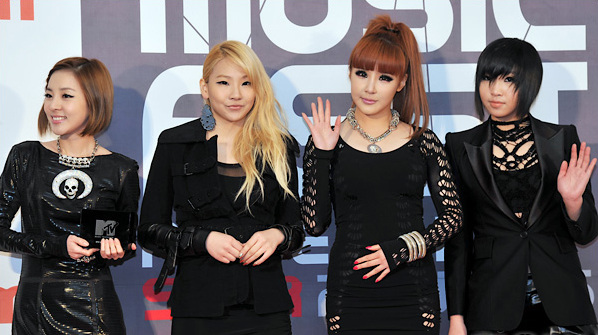
2NE1 was the first K-Pop group to reach the number one spot with "I Am the Best" in 2014.

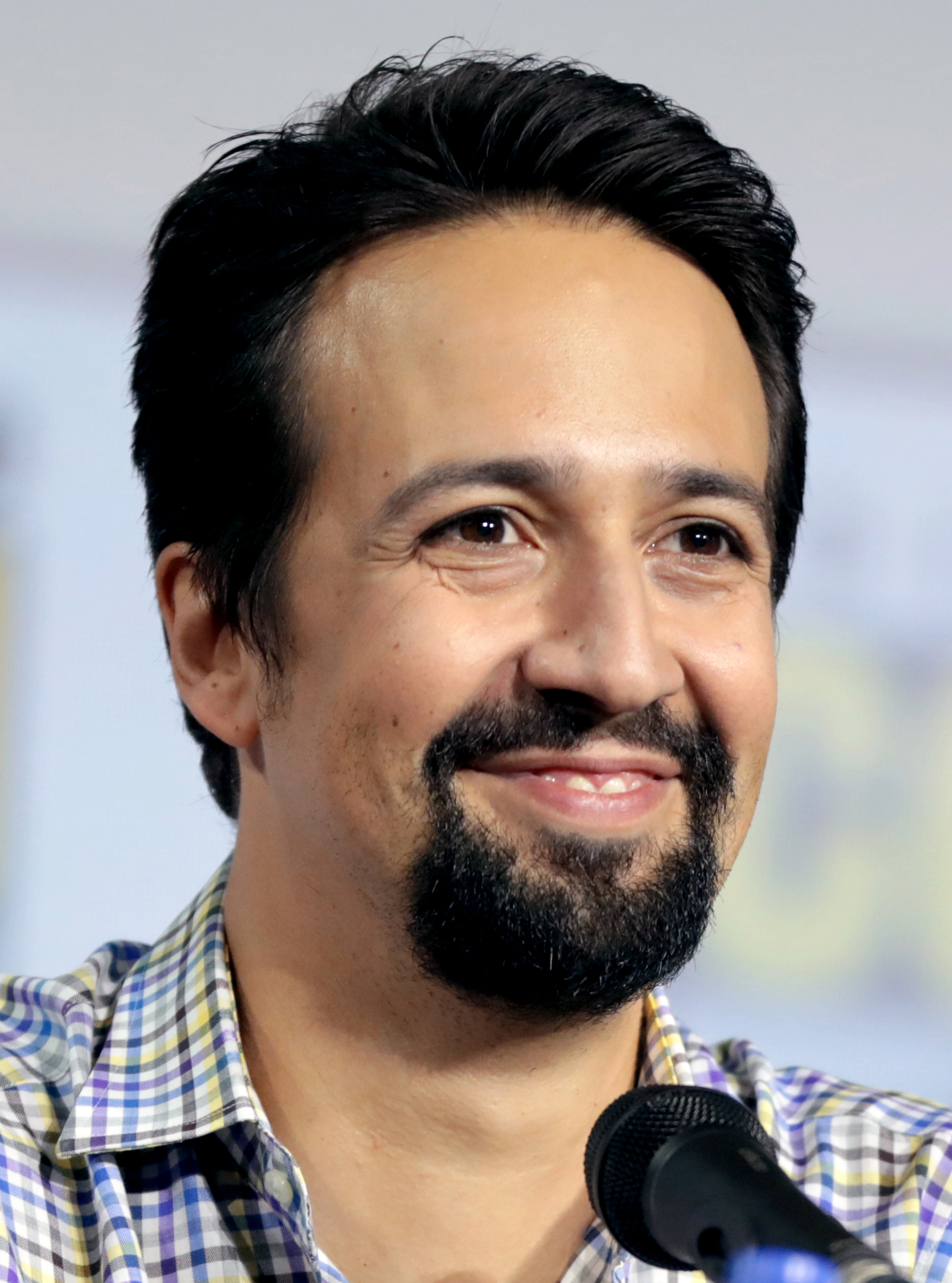
Lin-Manuel Miranda collaborated with Opetaia Foa'i on "We Know the Way" which spent 29 non-consecutive weeks at number one.

Issue date	Song	Artist(s)	Wks.	Ref.
January 23, 2010	"Somewhere Over the Rainbow"	Israel Kamakawiwoʻole	116	
April 14, 2012	"Zou Bisou Bisou"	Jessica Paré	1	
April 21, 2012	"Somewhere Over the Rainbow"	Israel Kamakawiwoʻole	1	
April 28, 2012	"Ai Se Eu Te Pego"	Michel Teló	4	
May 26, 2012	"Somewhere Over the Rainbow"	Israel Kamakawiwoʻole	12	
August 18, 2012	"Gangnam Style"	Psy	36	
April 27, 2013	"Gentleman"	Psy	7	
June 15, 2013	"Gangnam Style"	Psy	12	
September 7, 2013	"Somewhere Over the Rainbow"	Israel Kamakawiwoʻole	9	
November 9, 2013	"Gangnam Style"	Psy	1	
November 16, 2013	"Somewhere Over the Rainbow"	Israel Kamakawiwoʻole	8	
January 11, 2014	"Gangnam Style"	Psy	1	
January 18, 2014	"Somewhere Over the Rainbow"	Israel Kamakawiwoʻole	23	
June 28, 2014	"Hangover"	Psy featuring Snoop Dogg	1	
July 5, 2014	"Somewhere Over the Rainbow"	Israel Kamakawiwoʻole	14	
October 11, 2014	"I Am the Best"	2NE1	1	
October 18, 2014	"Somewhere Over the Rainbow"	Israel Kamakawiwoʻole	7	
December 6, 2014	"Good Boy"	GD X Taeyang	1	
December 13, 2014	"Somewhere Over the Rainbow"	Israel Kamakawiwoʻole	8	
February 14, 2015	"I Am the Best"	2NE1	1	
February 21, 2015	"Somewhere Over the Rainbow"	Israel Kamakawiwoʻole	12	
May 16, 2015	"Loser"	BigBang	1	
May 23, 2015	"Somewhere Over the Rainbow"	Israel Kamakawiwoʻole	4	
June 20, 2015	"Bang Bang Bang"	BigBang	1	
June 27, 2015	"Somewhere Over the Rainbow"	Israel Kamakawiwoʻole	1	
July 4, 2015	"Lava"	Kuana Torres Kahele and Napua Greig	6	
August 15, 2015	"Somewhere Over the Rainbow"	Israel Kamakawiwoʻole	1	
August 22, 2015	"Let's Not Fall in Love"	BigBang	1	
August 29, 2015	"Somewhere Over the Rainbow"	Israel Kamakawiwoʻole	16	
December 19, 2015	"Daddy"	Psy featuring CL	3	
January 9, 2016	"Somewhere Over the Rainbow"	Israel Kamakawiwoʻole	18	
May 14, 2016	"There Will Be Time"	Mumford & Sons x Baaba Maal	1	
May 21, 2016	"Fire"	BTS	1	
May 28, 2016	"Somewhere Over the Rainbow"	Israel Kamakawiwoʻole	4	
June 25, 2016	"Monster"	Exo	2	
July 9, 2016	"Somewhere Over the Rainbow"	Israel Kamakawiwoʻole	7	
August 27, 2016	"Boombayah"	Blackpink	1	
September 3, 2016	"Somewhere Over the Rainbow"	Israel Kamakawiwoʻole	1	
September 10, 2016	"Lotto"	Exo	1	
September 17, 2016	"Somewhere Over the Rainbow"	Israel Kamakawiwoʻole	6	
October 29, 2016	"Blood Sweat & Tears"	BTS	1	
November 5, 2016	"Somewhere Over the Rainbow"	Israel Kamakawiwoʻole	2	
November 19, 2016	"Playing with Fire"	Blackpink	1	
November 26, 2016	"Somewhere Over the Rainbow"	Israel Kamakawiwoʻole	2	
December 10, 2016	"We Know the Way"	Opetaia Foa'i and Lin-Manuel Miranda	9	
February 11, 2017	"Goodbye"	2NE1	1	
February 18, 2017	"We Know the Way"	Opetaia Foa'i and Lin-Manuel Miranda	1	
February 25, 2017	"Somewhere Over the Rainbow"	Israel Kamakawiwoʻole	1	
March 4, 2017	"Spring Day"	BTS	1	
March 11, 2017	"Not Today"	BTS	1	
March 18, 2017	"We Know the Way"	Opetaia Foa'i and Lin-Manuel Miranda	11	
June 3, 2017	"Somewhere Over the Rainbow"	Israel Kamakawiwoʻole	5	
July 8, 2017	"As If It's Your Last"	Blackpink	2	
July 22, 2017	"We Know the Way"	Opetaia Foa'i and Lin-Manuel Miranda	6	
September 2, 2017	"Somewhere Over the Rainbow"	Israel Kamakawiwoʻole	1	
September 9, 2017	"We Know the Way"	Opetaia Foa'i and Lin-Manuel Miranda	1	
September 16, 2017	"Somewhere Over the Rainbow"	Israel Kamakawiwoʻole	1	
September 23, 2017	"We Know the Way"	Opetaia Foa'i and Lin-Manuel Miranda	1	
September 30, 2017	"Somewhere Over the Rainbow"	Israel Kamakawiwoʻole	1	
October 7, 2017	"DNA"	BTS	2	
October 21, 2017	"Somewhere Over the Rainbow"	Israel Kamakawiwoʻole	4	
November 18, 2017	"Likey"	Twice	2	
December 2, 2017	"Somewhere Over the Rainbow"	Israel Kamakawiwoʻole	1	
December 9, 2017	"DNA"	BTS	1	
December 16, 2017	"Mic Drop"	BTS featuring Desiigner	13	
March 10, 2018	"Somewhere Over the Rainbow"	Israel Kamakawiwoʻole	1	
March 17, 2018	"Daydream"	J-Hope	1	
March 24, 2018	"Flower Road"	BigBang	1	
March 31, 2018	"Somewhere Over the Rainbow"	Israel Kamakawiwoʻole	2	
April 14, 2018	"Don't Leave Me"	BTS	2	
April 28, 2018	"Somewhere Over the Rainbow"	Israel Kamakawiwoʻole	5	
June 2, 2018	"Fake Love"	BTS	4	
June 30, 2018	"Ddu-Du Ddu-Du"	Blackpink	1	
July 7, 2018	"Somewhere Over the Rainbow"	Israel Kamakawiwoʻole	9	
September 8, 2018	"Idol"	BTS featuring Nicki Minaj	6	
October 20, 2018	"La Vie en rose"	Lady Gaga	1	
October 27, 2018	"Fake Love"	BTS	1	
November 3, 2018	"Checklist"	Normani x Calvin Harris featuring WizKid	1	
November 10, 2018	"Somewhere Over the Rainbow"	Israel Kamakawiwoʻole	1	
November 17, 2018	"Pop/Stars"	K/DA	1	
November 24, 2018	"2! 3! (Still Wishing There Will Be Better Days)"	BTS	1	
December 1, 2018	"Solo"	Jennie	1	
December 8, 2018	"Simon Says"	NCT 127	1	
December 15, 2018	"RBB (Really Bad Boy)"	Red Velvet	1	
December 22, 2018	"Love Shot"	Exo	3	
January 12, 2019	"Somewhere Over the Rainbow"	Israel Kamakawiwoʻole	3	
February 2, 2019	"Face My Fears"	Hikaru Utada and Skrillex	4	
March 2, 2019	"Somewhere Over the Rainbow"	Israel Kamakawiwoʻole	2	
March 16, 2019	"Crown"	Tomorrow X Together	1	
March 23, 2019	"Somewhere Over the Rainbow"	Israel Kamakawiwoʻole	3	
April 13, 2019	"Deutschland"	Rammstein	1	
April 20, 2019	"Kill This Love"	Blackpink	1	
April 27, 2019	"Boy with Luv"	BTS featuring Halsey	8	
June 22, 2019	"Dream Glow"	BTS and Charli XCX	1	
June 29, 2019	"A Brand New Day"	BTS and Zara Larsson	1	
July 6, 2019	"All Night"	BTS and Juice Wrld	1	
July 13, 2019	"Heartbeat"	BTS	1	
July 20, 2019	"Lights"	BTS	1	
July 27, 2019	"Circle of Life / Nants' Ingonyama"	Lindiwe Mkhize and Lebo M	1	
August 3, 2019	"Brown Skin Girl"	Beyoncé, Saint Jhn and WizKid featuring Blue Ivy Carter	3	
August 24, 2019	"Somewhere Over the Rainbow"	Israel Kamakawiwoʻole	6	
October 5, 2019	"Feel Special"	Twice	1	
October 12, 2019	"Chicken Noodle Soup"	J-Hope featuring Becky G	1	
October 19, 2019	"Jopping"	SuperM	1	
October 26, 2019	"Somewhere Over the Rainbow"	Israel Kamakawiwoʻole	1	
November 2, 2019	"Make It Right"	BTS featuring Lauv	1	
November 9, 2019	"Somewhere Over the Rainbow"	Israel Kamakawiwoʻole	1	
November 16, 2019	"Make It Right"	BTS featuring Lauv	2	
November 30, 2019	"Hip"	Mamamoo	1	
December 7, 2019	"Ahimsa"	U2 and A. R. Rahman	1	
December 14, 2019	"Obsession"	Exo	1	
December 21, 2019	"Somewhere Over the Rainbow"	Israel Kamakawiwoʻole	1	
December 28, 2019	"365"	Loona	1	
January 4, 2020	"Psycho"	Red Velvet	1	
January 11, 2020	"Somewhere Over the Rainbow"	Israel Kamakawiwoʻole	1	
January 18, 2020	"Winter Flower"	Younha featuring RM	1	
January 25, 2020	"Wolf Totem"	The Hu featuring Jacoby Shaddix	1	
February 1, 2020	"Black Swan"	BTS	3	
February 22, 2020	"Somewhere Over the Rainbow"	Israel Kamakawiwoʻole	2	
March 7, 2020	"On"	BTS	3	
March 28, 2020	"From Zero"	Monsta X	1	
April 4, 2020	"Somewhere Over the Rainbow"	Israel Kamakawiwoʻole	6	
May 16, 2020	"Eight"	IU featuring Suga	1	
May 23, 2020	"Somewhere Over the Rainbow"	Israel Kamakawiwoʻole	2	
June 6, 2020	"Daechwita"	Agust D	1	
June 13, 2020	"Somewhere Over the Rainbow"	Israel Kamakawiwoʻole	3	
July 4, 2020	"Stay Gold"	BTS	1	
July 11, 2020	"How You Like That"	Blackpink	2	
July 25, 2020	"Your Eyes Tell"	BTS	1	
August 1, 2020	"How You Like That"	Blackpink	1	
August 8, 2020	"Wolf Totem"	The Hu featuring Jacoby Shaddix	1	
August 15, 2020	"My Time"	BTS	1	
August 22, 2020	"Wolf Totem"	The Hu featuring Jacoby Shaddix	2	
September 5, 2020	"On"	BTS	1	
September 12, 2020	"The Baddest"	K/DA	1	
September 19, 2020	"Jerusalema"	Master KG featuring Burna Boy and Nomcebo Zikode	1	
September 26, 2020	"Oh My Gawd"	Mr Eazi X Major Lazer featuring Nicki Minaj and K4mo	1	
October 3, 2020	"Jerusalema"	Master KG featuring Burna Boy and Nomcebo Zikode	1	
October 10, 2020	"Filter"	BTS	1	
October 17, 2020	"Lovesick Girls"	Blackpink	1	
October 24, 2020	"Jerusalema"	Master KG featuring Burna Boy and Nomcebo Zikode	1	
October 31, 2020	"G.B.T.B."	Verivery	1	
November 7, 2020	"I Can't Stop Me"	Twice	1	
November 14, 2020	"More"	K/DA	1	
November 21, 2020	"Jerusalema"	Master KG featuring Burna Boy and Nomcebo Zikode	2	
December 5, 2020	"Life Goes On"	BTS	4	
January 2, 2021	"Cry for Me"	Twice	1	
January 9, 2021	"Stay"	BTS	1	
January 16, 2021	"Somewhere Over the Rainbow"	Israel Kamakawiwoʻole	4	
February 13, 2021	"World Money"	Tomoro featuring Nice & Smooth	1	
February 20, 2021	"Jerusalema"	Master KG featuring Burna Boy and Nomcebo Zikode	1	
February 27, 2021	"Somewhere Over the Rainbow"	Israel Kamakawiwoʻole	1	
March 6, 2021	"Inner Child"	BTS	1	
March 13, 2021	"Daechwita"	Agust D	1	
March 20, 2021	"Get Away"	Verivery	2	
April 3, 2021	"Somewhere Over the Rainbow"	Israel Kamakawiwoʻole	2	
April 17, 2021	"Film Out"	BTS	1	
April 24, 2021	"Somewhere Over the Rainbow"	Israel Kamakawiwoʻole	2	
May 8, 2021	"Singularity"	BTS	1	
May 15, 2021	"Don't"	eAeon featuring RM	1	
May 22, 2021	"Somewhere Over the Rainbow"	Israel Kamakawiwoʻole	2	
June 5, 2021	"Life Goes On"	BTS	1	
June 12, 2021	"Stigma"	BTS	1	
June 19, 2021	"Somewhere Over the Rainbow"	Israel Kamakawiwoʻole	3	
July 10, 2021	"Mixtape: Oh"	Stray Kids	1	
July 17, 2021	"Euphoria"	BTS	1	
July 24, 2021	"Essence"	Wizkid featuring Justin Bieber and Tems	4	
August 21, 2021	"Begin"	BTS	1	
August 28, 2021	"Essence"	Wizkid featuring Justin Bieber and Tems	4	
September 25, 2021	"Lalisa"	Lisa	1	
October 2, 2021	"Essence"	Wizkid featuring Justin Bieber and Tems	7	
November 20, 2021	"Yours"	Jin	1	
November 27, 2021	"Essence"	Wizkid featuring Justin Bieber and Tems	2	
December 11, 2021	"Hcoin To The Moon"	Miles Guo	2	
December 25, 2021	"Love Nwantiti"	CKay	1	
January 1, 2022	"Ameno Amapiano (You Wanna Bamba)"	Goya Menor and Nektunez	2	
January 15, 2022	"Love Nwantiti"	CKay	2	
January 29, 2022	"Ameno Amapiano (You Wanna Bamba)"	Goya Menor and Nektunez	4	
February 26, 2022	"Stay Alive"	Jungkook	2	
March 12, 2022	"Love Nwantiti"	CKay	1	
March 19, 2022	"Somewhere Over the Rainbow"	Israel Kamakawiwoʻole	1	
March 26, 2022	"Peru"	Fireboy DML and Ed Sheeran	1	
April 2, 2022	"Maniac"	Stray Kids	1	
April 9, 2022	"Peru"	Fireboy DML and Ed Sheeran	1	
April 16, 2022	"Still Life"	BigBang	1	
April 23, 2022	"Hey, Hey, Rise Up!"	Pink Floyd featuring Andriy Khlyvnyuk	1	
April 30, 2022	"Shake It"	Loona	1	
May 7, 2022	"Peru"	Fireboy DML and Ed Sheeran	1	
May 14, 2022	"That That"	Psy featuring Suga	2	
May 28, 2022	"Somewhere Over the Rainbow"	Israel Kamakawiwoʻole	4	
June 25, 2022	"Yet to Come (The Most Beautiful Moment)"	BTS	3	
July 16, 2022	"More"	J-Hope	1	
July 23, 2022	"Somewhere Over the Rainbow"	Israel Kamakawiwoʻole	1	
July 30, 2022	"Arson"	J-Hope	1	
August 6, 2022	"No Woman, No Cry"	Tems	2	
August 20, 2022	"Somewhere Over the Rainbow"	Israel Kamakawiwoʻole	2	
September 3, 2022	"Pink Venom"	Blackpink	1	
September 10, 2022	"Sexy Nukim"	Balming Tiger featuring RM	2	
September 24, 2022	"Calm Down"	Rema and Selena Gomez	1	
October 1, 2022	"Shut Down"	Blackpink	1	
October 8, 2022	"Rush Hour"	Crush featuring J-Hope	1	
October 15, 2022	"Calm Down"	Rema and Selena Gomez	1	
October 22, 2022	"Case 143"	Stray Kids	1	
October 29, 2022	"Calm Down"	Rema and Selena Gomez	1	
November 5, 2022	"Super Tuna"	Jin	1	
November 12, 2022	"The Astronaut"	Jin	3	
December 3, 2022	"Dreamers"	Jungkook	2	
December 17, 2022	"Wild Flower"	RM featuring Youjeen	1	
December 24, 2022	"Calm Down"	Rema and Selena Gomez	5	
January 28, 2023	"Vibe"	Taeyang featuring Jimin	1	
February 4, 2023	"Calm Down"	Rema and Selena Gomez	1	
February 11, 2023	"Sugar Rush Ride"	Tomorrow X Together	1	
February 18, 2023	"Attack on Bangtan"	BTS	1	
February 25, 2023	"Calm Down"	Rema and Selena Gomez	5	
April 1, 2023	"Set Me Free Pt. 2"	Jimin	1	
April 8, 2023	"Like Crazy"	Jimin	2	
April 22, 2023	"People Pt. 2"	Agust D featuring IU	1	
April 29, 2023	"Like Crazy"	Jimin	1	
May 6, 2023	"Haegeum"	Agust D	1	
May 13, 2023	"Calm Down"	Rema and Selena Gomez	2	
May 27, 2023	"The Planet"	BTS	1	
June 3, 2023	"Calm Down"	Rema and Selena Gomez	3	
June 24, 2023	"Take Two"	BTS	1	
July 1, 2023	"Calm Down"	Rema and Selena Gomez	1	
July 8, 2023	"Like Crazy"	Jimin	1	
July 15, 2023	"Still with You"	Jungkook	1	
July 22, 2023	"Calm Down"	Rema and Selena Gomez	5	
August 26, 2023	"Love Me Again"	V	1	
September 2, 2023	"More"	J-Hope	1	
September 9, 2023	"Calm Down"	Rema and Selena Gomez	7	
October 28, 2023	"Chasing That Feeling"	Tomorrow X Together	1	
November 4, 2023	"Water"	Tyla	3	
November 25, 2023	"Lalalala"	Stray Kids	1	
December 2, 2023	"Water"	Tyla	3	
December 23, 2023	"Spring Day"	BTS	1	
December 30, 2023	"No More Dream"	BTS	1	
January 6, 2024	"Closer Than This"	Jimin	1	
January 13, 2024	"Water"	Tyla	3	
February 3, 2024	"Danger"	BTS	1	
February 10, 2024	"Water"	Tyla	2	
February 24, 2024	"Ruin"	Usher and Pheelz	1	
March 2, 2024	"Water"	Tyla	1	
March 9, 2024	"Fake Love"	BTS	1	
March 16, 2024	"Water"	Tyla	4	
April 13, 2024	"Neuron"	J-Hope (with Gaeko and Yoon Mi-rae)	1	
April 20, 2024	"Why Kiki?"	Iam Tongi	1	
April 27, 2024	"Water"	Tyla	2	
May 11, 2024	"Spot!"	Zico featuring Jennie	1	
May 18, 2024	"Not Today"	BTS	1	
May 25, 2024	"Somewhere Over the Rainbow"	Israel Kamakawiwoʻole	2	
June 8, 2024	"Nuts"	RM	1	
June 15, 2024	"Work"	Ateez	1	
June 22, 2024	"Super Tuna"	Jin	1	
June 29, 2024	"Somewhere Over the Rainbow"	Israel Kamakawiwoʻole	2	
July 13, 2024	"Smeraldo Garden Marching Band"	Jimin	1	
July 20, 2024	"Mamushi"	Megan Thee Stallion featuring Yuki Chiba	2	
August 3, 2024	"Chk Chk Boom"	Stray Kids	2	
August 17, 2024	"Mamushi"	Megan Thee Stallion featuring Yuki Chiba	1	
August 24, 2024	"Active"	Asake and Travis Scott	1	
August 31, 2024	"Mamushi"	Megan Thee Stallion featuring Yuki Chiba	1	
September 7, 2024	"The Last"	Agust D	1	
September 14, 2024	"Crazy"	Le Sserafim	1	
September 21, 2024	"Mamushi"	Megan Thee Stallion featuring Yuki Chiba	4	
October 19, 2024	"Otonoke"	Creepy Nuts	1	
October 26, 2024	"Super Tuna"	Jin	1	
November 2, 2024	"Otonoke"	Creepy Nuts	1	
November 9, 2024	"I'll Be There"	Jin	1	
November 16, 2024	"Otonoke"	Creepy Nuts	2	
November 30, 2024	"Heart On the Window"	Jin and Wendy	1	
December 7, 2024	"Falling"	Jin	1	
December 14, 2024	"Otonoke"	Creepy Nuts	2	
December 28, 2024	"Walkin on Water"	Stray Kids	1	
January 4, 2025	"Otonoke"	Creepy Nuts	2	
January 18, 2025	"Mingle Game Squid Song: Merry-Go-Round"	Bodybag Zippers	1	
January 25, 2025	"Somewhere Over the Rainbow"	Israel Kamakawiwoʻole	2	
February 8, 2025	"Close to You"	Jin	1	
February 15, 2025	"Somewhere Over the Rainbow"	Israel Kamakawiwoʻole	2	
March 1, 2025	"Earthquake"	Jisoo	1	
March 8, 2025	"ReawakeR"	Lisa and Felix	1	
March 15, 2025	"Dam"	SB19	1	
March 22, 2025	"Somewhere Over the Rainbow"	Israel Kamakawiwoʻole	1	
March 29, 2025	"Hot"	Le Sserafim	1	
April 5, 2025	"Escape"	Bang Chan and Hyunjin	1	
April 12, 2025	"Somewhere Over the Rainbow"	Israel Kamakawiwoʻole	2	
April 26, 2025	"Shake It to the Max (Fly)"	Moliy, Silent Addy, Skillibeng and Shenseea	2	
May 10, 2025	"Somewhere Over the Rainbow"	Israel Kamakawiwoʻole	1	
May 17, 2025	"Love Language"	Tomorrow X Together	1	
May 24, 2025	"Hawaiian Roller Coaster Ride"	Iam Tongi and Kamehameha Schools Children's Chorus	1	
May 31, 2025	"Nothing Without Your Love"	Jin	1	
June 7, 2025	"Hawaiian Roller Coaster Ride"	Iam Tongi and Kamehameha Schools Children's Chorus	1	
June 14, 2025	"Shake It to the Max (Fly)"	Moliy, Silent Addy, Skillibeng and Shenseea	2	
June 28, 2025	"Lemon Drop"	Ateez	1	
July 5, 2025	"Home"	BTS	1	
July 12, 2025	"Shake It to the Max (Fly)"	Moliy, Silent Addy, Skillibeng and Shenseea	2	
July 26, 2025	"In Your Fantasy"	Ateez	1	
August 2, 2025	"Permission to Dance (Live)"	BTS	1	
August 9, 2025	"Shake It to the Max (Fly)"	Moliy, Silent Addy, Skillibeng and Shenseea	2	
August 23, 2025	"Hunting Soul"	Kishō Taniyama	1	
August 30, 2025	"Shake It to the Max (Fly)"	Moliy, Silent Addy, Skillibeng and Shenseea	1	
September 6, 2025	"Ceremony"	Stray Kids	2	
September 20, 2025	"Lights"	BTS	1	
September 27, 2025	"Somewhere Over the Rainbow"	Israel Kamakawiwoʻole	3	
October 18, 2025	"Shake It to the Max (Fly)"	Moliy, Silent Addy, Skillibeng, and Shenseea	2	
November 1, 2025	"Somewhere Over the Rainbow"	Israel Kamakawiwoʻole	1	
November 8, 2025	"Spaghetti"	Le Sserafim featuring J-Hope	2	
November 22, 2025	"Ma City"	BTS	1	
November 29, 2025	"Somewhere Over the Rainbow"	Israel Kamakawiwoʻole	1	
December 6, 2025	"Do It"	Stray Kids	1	
December 13, 2025	"Good Goodbye"	Hwasa	1	
December 20, 2025	"Anpanman"	BTS	1	
December 27, 2025	"Lullaby"	Nai Barghouti, Leigh-Anne, and Neneh Cherry, featuring Amena, Bastille, Brian Eno	1	
January 3, 2026	"Chanel"	Tyla	1	
January 10, 2026	"Run BTS"	BTS	1	
January 17, 2026	"Chanel"	Tyla	2	
January 31, 2026	"Knife"	Enhypen	1	
February 7, 2026	"Papaoutai (Afro Soul)"	Chill77 and Unjaps	1	
February 14, 2026	Chanel	Tyla	1	
February 21, 2026	"Adrenaline"	Ateez	1	
February 28, 2026	"Papaoutai (Afro Soul)"	Chill77 and Unjaps	1	
March 7, 2026	"Let Me Be"	The Second Voice	1	
March 14, 2026	"Berghain"	Rosalía, Björk, and Yves Tumor	1	
March 28, 2026	"Rocky Road to Dublin"	Jack O'Connell, Brian Dunphy, and Darren Holden	1	
April 4, 2026	"Aliens"	BTS	1	
April 11, 2026	"Let Me Be"	The Second Voice	10	
June 20, 2026	"Dai Dai"	Shakira and Burna Boy	1	
June 27, 2026	"Come Over"	BTS	1	

== Song milestones ==
=== Most weeks at number one ===
Number of weeks	Song	Artist(s)	Ref.
375	"Somewhere Over the Rainbow"	Israel Kamakawiwoʻole	
50	"Gangnam Style"	Psy	
32	"Calm Down"	Rema featuring Selena Gomez	
29	"We Know the Way"	Opetaia Foa'i and Lin-Manuel Miranda	
18	"Water"	Tyla	
17	"Essence"	Wizkid featuring Justin Bieber and Tems	

=== Most total weeks on the World Digital Song Sales chart ===
Number of weeks	Song	Artist(s)	Ref.
856	"Somewhere Over the Rainbow"	Israel Kamakawiwoʻole	
396	"Hawaiian Roller Coaster Ride"	Kamehameha Schools Children's Chorus and Mark Kealiʻi Hoʻomalu	
381	"Gangnam Style"	Psy	
299	"The Girl from Ipanema"	Stan Getz and João Gilberto	
297	"La Vie en rose"	Édith Piaf	
275	"Du hast"	Rammstein	
272	"He Mele No Lilo"	Kamehameha Schools Children's Chorus and Mark Kealiʻi Hoʻomalu	
206	"What a Wonderful World"	Israel Kamakawiwoʻole	
190	"Ai Se Eu Te Pego"	Michel Teló	
190	"Non, je ne regrette rien"	Édith Piaf	

== Artist achievements ==
=== Most number-one singles ===
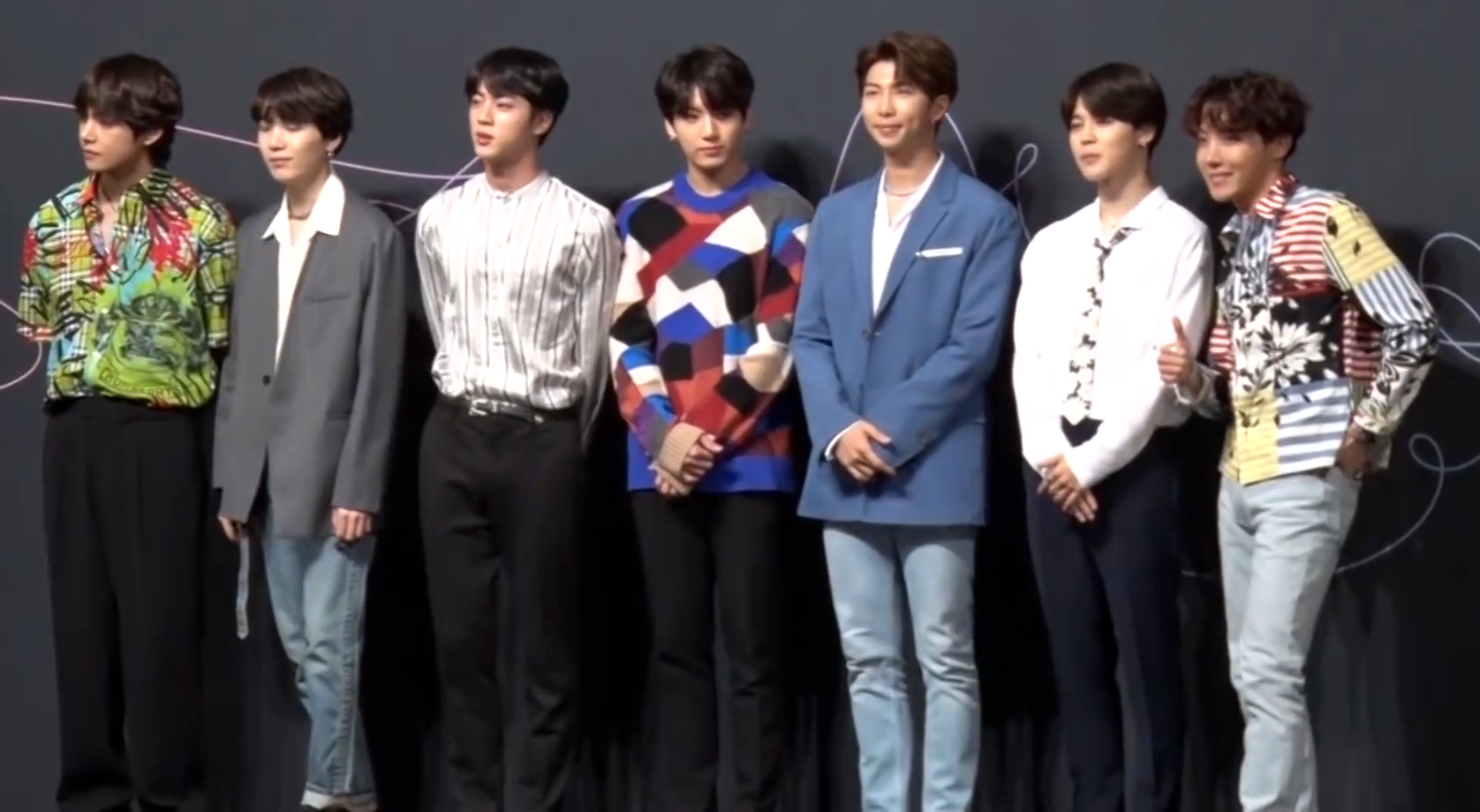
BTS has the most number-one singles of any artist on the chart, with 44.

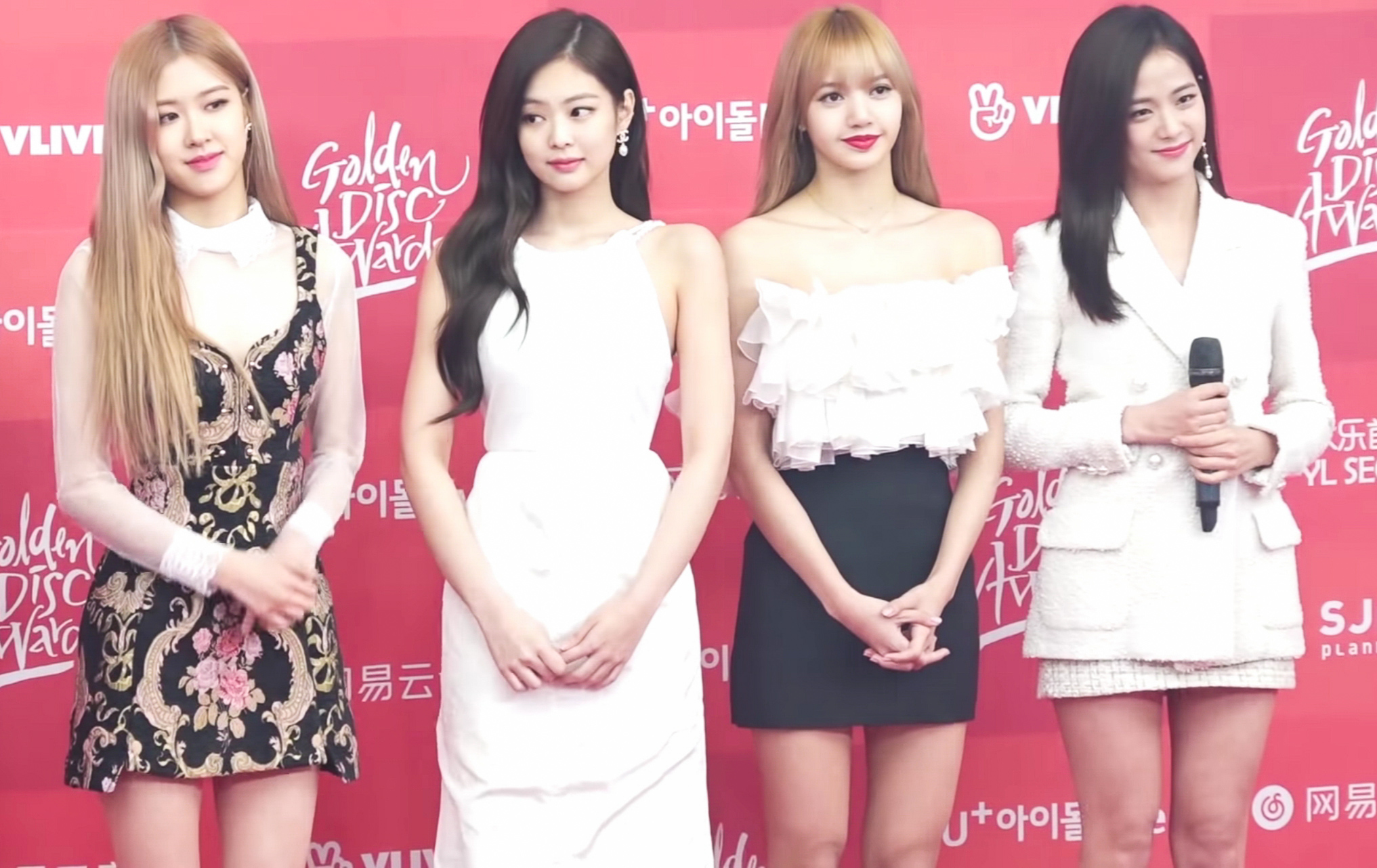
Blackpink has the most number-one singles for a female artist on the chart, with nine.

Number of singles	Artist (Note: Where multiple artists share a ranking, the oldest is listed first)	Songs (Note: songs are listed oldest to newest)	Ref.
44	BTS	"Fire" "Blood Sweat & Tears" "Spring Day" "Not Today" "DNA" "Mic Drop" (featuring Desiigner) "Don't Leave Me" "Fake Love" "Idol" (featuring Nicki Minaj) "2! 3! (Still Wishing There Will Be Better Days)" "Boy with Luv" (featuring Halsey) "Dream Glow" (with Charli XCX) "A Brand New Day" (with Zara Larsson) "All Night" (with Juice Wrld) "Heartbeat" "Lights" "Make It Right" (featuring Lauv) "Black Swan" "On" "Stay Gold" "Your Eyes Tell" "My Time" "Filter" "Life Goes On" "Stay" "Inner Child" "Film Out" "Singularity" "Stigma" "Euphoria" "Begin" "Yet to Come" "Attack On Bangtan" "The Planet" "Take Two" "No More Dream" "Danger" "Home" "Permission to Dance (Live)" "Ma City" "Anpanman" "Run BTS" "Aliens" "Come Over"	
9	Blackpink	"Boombayah" "Playing with Fire" "As If It's Your Last" "Ddu-Du Ddu-Du" "Kill This Love" "How You Like That" "Lovesick Girls" "Pink Venom" "Shut Down"	
8	Jin	"Yours" "Super Tuna" "The Astronaut" "I'll Be There" "Heart On the Window" (with Wendy) "Falling" "Close to You" "Nothing Without Your Love"	
8	Stray Kids	"Mixtape: Oh" "Maniac" "Case 143" "Lalalala" "Chk Chk Boom" "Walkin on Water" "Ceremony" "Do It"	
7	J-Hope	"Daydream" "Chicken Noodle Soup" (featuring Becky G) "More" "Arson" "Rush Hour" (with Crush) "Neuron" (with Gaeko and Yoon Mi-rae) "Spaghetti" (with Le Sserafim)	
6	Suga	"Eight" (with IU) "Daechwita" "That That" (with Psy) "People Pt. 2" (featuring IU) "Haegeum" "The Last"	
5	Psy	"Gangnam Style" "Gentleman" "Hangover" (featuring Snoop Dogg) "Daddy" (featuring CL) "That That" (featuring Suga)	
5	Big Bang	"Loser" "Bang Bang Bang" "Let's Not Fall in Love" "Flower Road" "Still Life"	
5	RM	"Winter Flower" (with Younha) "Don't (with eAeon)" "Sexy Nukim" (with Balming Tiger) "Wildflower" (featuring Youjeen) "Nuts"	
5	Jimin	"Vibe" (with Taeyang) "Set Me Free Pt. 2 "Like Crazy" "Closer Than This "Smeraldo Garden Marching Band"	

=== Most cumulative weeks at number one (all songs) ===
Weeks at number one	Artist
375	Israel Kamakawiwoʻole
93	BTS
63	Psy
32	Rema and Selena Gomez
29	Opetaia Foa'i and Lin-Manuel Miranda

=== Number one debuts ===
Issue date	Song	Artist(s)	Ref.
April 27, 2013	"Gentleman"	Psy	
June 28, 2014	"Hangover"	Psy (featuring Snoop Dogg)	
December 6, 2014	"Good Boy"	GD X Taeyang	
May 16, 2015	"Loser"	Big Bang	
June 20, 2015	"Bang Bang Bang"	Big Bang	
July 4, 2015	"Lava"	Kuana Torres Kahele and Napua Greig	
August 22, 2015	"Let's Not Fall in Love"	Big Bang	
December 19, 2015	"Daddy"	Psy (featuring CL)	
May 14, 2016	"There Will Be Time"	Mumford & Sons x Baaba Maal	
May 21, 2016	"Fire"	BTS	
June 25, 2016	"Monster"	Exo	
August 27, 2016	"Boombayah"	Blackpink	
September 10, 2016	"Lotto"	Exo	
October 29, 2016	"Blood Sweat & Tears"	BTS	
November 19, 2016	"Playing with Fire"	Blackpink	
February 11, 2017	"Goodbye"	2NE1	
March 4, 2017	"Spring Day"	BTS	
July 8, 2017	"As If It's Your Last"	Blackpink	
October 7, 2017	"DNA"	BTS	
November 18, 2017	"Likey"	Twice	
March 24, 2018	"Flower Road"	Big Bang	
April 14, 2018	"Don't Leave Me"	BTS	
June 2, 2018	"Fake Love"	BTS	
June 30, 2018	"Ddu-Du Ddu-Du"	Blackpink	
September 8, 2018	"Idol"	BTS (featuring Nicki Minaj)	
October 20, 2018	"La Vie en rose"	Lady Gaga	
November 3, 2018	"Checklist"	Normani x Calvin Harris (featuring WizKid)	
November 17, 2018	"Pop/Stars"	K/DA	
November 24, 2018	"2! 3! (Still Wishing There Will Be Better Days)"	BTS	
December 8, 2018	"Simon Says"	NCT 127	
December 15, 2018	"RBB (Really Bad Boy)"	Red Velvet	
December 22, 2018	"Love Shot"	Exo	
February 2, 2019	"Face My Fears"	Hikaru Utada and Skrillex	
March 16, 2019	"Crown"	Tomorrow X Together	
April 13, 2019	"Deutschland"	Rammstein	
April 27, 2019	"Boy with Luv"	BTS (featuring Halsey)	
June 22, 2019	"Dream Glow"	BTS and Charli XCX	
June 29, 2019	"A Brand New Day"	BTS and Zara Larsson	
July 6, 2019	"All Night"	BTS and Juice Wrld	
July 13, 2019	"Heartbeat"	BTS	
August 3, 2019	"Brown Skin Girl"	Beyoncé, Saint Jhn and Wizkid (featuring Blue Ivy Carter)	
October 5, 2019	"Feel Special"	Twice	
October 12, 2019	"Chicken Noodle Soup"	J-Hope (featuring Becky G)	
October 19, 2019	"Jopping"	SuperM	
December 7, 2019	"Ahimsa"	U2 and A. R. Rahman	
December 28, 2019	"365"	Loona	
January 4, 2020	"Psycho"	Red Velvet	
January 18, 2020	"Winter Flower"	Younha (featuring RM)	
February 1, 2020	"Black Swan"	BTS	
March 7, 2020	"On"	BTS	
March 28, 2020	"From Zero"	Monsta X	
May 16, 2020	"Eight"	IU (featuring Suga)	
June 6, 2020	"Daechwita"	Agust D	
July 4, 2020	"Stay Gold"	BTS	
July 11, 2020	"How You Like That"	Blackpink	
July 25, 2020	"Your Eyes Tell"	BTS	
September 12, 2020	"The Baddest"	K/DA	
September 26, 2020	"Oh My Gawd"	Mr Eazi X Major Lazer (featuring Nicki Minaj and K4mo)	
October 17, 2020	"Lovesick Girls"	Blackpink	
October 31, 2020	"G.B.T.B."	Verivery	
November 7, 2020	"I Can't Stop Me"	Twice	
December 5, 2020	"Life Goes On"	BTS	
January 2, 2021	"Cry For Me"	Twice	
February 13, 2021	"World Money"	Tomoro (featuring Nice & Smooth)	
March 20, 2021	"Get Away"	Verivery	
April 17, 2021	"Film Out"	BTS	
May 15, 2021	"Don't"	eAeon (featuring RM)	
July 10, 2021	"Mixtape: Oh"	Stray Kids	
September 25, 2021	"Lalisa"	Lisa	
November 20, 2021	"Yours"	Jin	
December 11, 2021	"Hcoin to the Moon"	Miles Guo	
February 26, 2022	"Stay Alive"	Jungkook	
April 2, 2022	"Maniac"	Stray Kids	
April 16, 2022	"Still Life"	Big Bang	
April 23, 2022	"Hey, Hey, Rise Up!"	Pink Floyd (featuring Andriy Khlyvnyuk)	
April 30, 2022	"Shake It"	Loona	
May 14, 2022	"That That"	Psy (featuring Suga)	
June 25, 2022	"Yet to Come"	BTS	
July 16, 2022	"More"	J-Hope	
July 30, 2022	"Arson"	J-Hope	
August 6, 2022	"No Woman No Cry"	Tems	
September 3, 2022	"Pink Venom"	Blackpink	
September 10, 2022	"Sexy Nukim"	Balming Tiger (featuring RM)	
October 1, 2022	"Shut Down"	Blackpink	
October 22, 2022	"Case 143"	Stray Kids	
November 5, 2022	"Super Tuna"	Jin	
November 12, 2022	"The Astronaut"	Jin	
December 3, 2022	"Dreamers"	Jungkook	
December 17, 2022	"Wild Flower"	RM (featuring Youjeen)	
January 28, 2023	"Vibe"	Taeyang (featuring Jimin)	
February 11, 2023	"Sugar Rush Ride"	Tomorrow X Together	
February 18, 2023	"Attack on Bangtan"	BTS	
April 1, 2023	"Set Me Free Pt. 2"	Jimin	
April 8, 2023	"Like Crazy"	Jimin	
April 22, 2023	"People Pt. 2"	Agust D (featuring IU)	
May 6, 2023	"Haegeum"	Agust D	
May 27, 2023	"The Planet"	BTS	
June 24, 2023	"Take Two"	BTS	
July 15, 2023	"Still with You"	Jungkook	
August 26, 2023	"Love Me Again"	V	
October 28, 2023	"Chasing That Feeling"	Tomorrow X Together	
November 25, 2023	"Lalalala"	Stray Kids	
January 6, 2024	"Closer Than This"	Jimin	
April 13, 2024	"Neuron"	J-Hope (with Gaeko and Yoon Mi-rae)	
May 11, 2024	"Spot!"	Zico (featuring Jennie)	
June 8, 2024	"Nuts"	RM	
June 15, 2024	"Work"	Ateez	
July 13, 2024	"Smeraldo Garden Marching Band"	Jimin	
August 3, 2024	"Chk Chk Boom"	Stray Kids	
August 24, 2024	"Active"	Asake and Travis Scott	
October 19, 2024	"Otonoke"	Creepy Nuts	
November 9, 2024	"I'll Be There"	Jin	
November 30, 2024	"Heart on the Window"	Jin with Wendy	
December 28, 2024	"Walkin on Water"	Stray Kids	
January 18, 2025	"Mingle Game Squid Song: Merry-Go-Round"	Bodybag Zippers	
February 8, 2025	"Close to You"	Jin	
March 1, 2025	"Earthquake"	Jisoo	
March 15, 2025	"Dam"	SB19	
March 29, 2025	"Hot"	Le Sserafim	
April 5, 2025	"Escape"	Bang Chan and Hyunjin	
May 17, 2025	"Love Language"	Tomorrow X Together	
May 24, 2025	"Hawaiian Roller Coaster Ride"	Iam Tongi and Kamehameha Schools Children's Chorus	
May 31, 2025	"Nothing Without Your Love"	Jin	
June 28, 2025	"Lemon Drop"	Ateez	
July 26, 2025	"In Your Fantasy"	Ateez	
August 2, 2025	"Permission to Dance (Live)"	BTS	
September 6, 2025	"Ceremony"	Stray Kids	
November 8, 2025	"Spaghetti"	Le Sserafim (featuring J-Hope)	
December 6, 2025	"Do It"	Stray Kids	
January 31, 2026	"Knife"	Enhypen	
February 21, 2026	"Adrenaline"	Ateez	
April 4, 2026	"Aliens"	BTS	
June 27, 2026	"Come Over"	BTS	

=== Most number-one debuts ===
Count	Artist	Songs
25 songs	BTS	"Fire" "Blood Sweat & Tears" "Spring Day" "DNA" "Don't Leave Me" "Fake Love" "Idol" (featuring Nicki Minaj) "2! 3! (Still Wishing There Will Be Better Days)" "Boy with Luv" (featuring Halsey) "Dream Glow" (with Charli XCX) "A Brand New Day" (with Zara Larsson) "All Night" (with Juice Wrld) "Heartbeat" "Black Swan" "On" "Stay Gold" "Your Eyes Tell" "Life Goes On" "Film Out" "Yet to Come (The Most Beautiful Moment)" "The Planet" "Take Two" "Permission to Dance (Live)" "Aliens" "Come Over"
8 songs	Blackpink	"Boombayah" "Playing with Fire" "As If It's Your Last" "Ddu-Du Ddu-Du" "How You Like That" "Lovesick Girls" "Pink Venom" "Shut Down"
8 songs	Stray Kids	"Mixtape: Oh" "Maniac" "Case 143" "Lalalala" "Chk Chk Boom" "Walkin on Water" "Ceremony" "Do It"
6 songs	Jin	"Yours" "Super Tuna" "The Astronaut" "I'll Be There" "Close to You" "Nothing Without Your Love"
5 songs	Big Bang	"Loser" "Bang Bang Bang" "Let's Not Fall in Love" "Flower Road" "Still Life"
5 songs	Suga	"Eight" (with IU) "Daechwita" "That That" (with Psy) "People Pt. 2" (featuring IU) "Haegeum"
5 songs	RM	"Winter Flower" (with Younha) "Don't" (with eAeon) "Sexy Nukim" (with Balming Tiger) "Wild Flower" (featuring Youjeen) "Nuts"
5 songs	Jimin	"Vibe" (with Taeyang) "Set Me Free Pt. 2 "Like Crazy" "Closer Than This "Smeraldo Garden Marching Band"
5 songs	J-Hope	"Chicken Noodle Soup" (featuring Becky G) "More" "Arson" "Neuron" "Spaghetti" (with Le Sserafim)
4 songs	Psy	"Gentleman" "Hangover" (featuring Snoop Dogg) "Daddy" (featuring CL) "That That" (featuring Suga)
4 songs	Twice	"Likey" "Feel Special" "I Can't Stop Me" "Cry for Me"
4 songs	Ateez	"Work" "Lemon Drop" "In Your Fantasy" "Adrenaline"
3 songs	Exo	"Monster" "Lotto" "Love Shot"
3 songs	Tomorrow X Together	"Crown" "Sugar Rush Ride" "Chasing That Feeling"
3 songs	Jungkook	"Stay Alive" "Dreamers" "Still with You"

== Other select World Digital Song Sales chart achievements ==
- BTS is the only act to simultaneously occupy the chart's top-15 spots on three separate occasions. The group did so on the issues dated September 8, 2018, with songs from Love Yourself: Answer; March 7, 2020, with songs from Map of the Soul: 7; and June 25, 2022, with songs from Proof.
- Blackpink tied with Psy and Big Bang for the second-most number-one singles of any act on the chart in 2018, when they earned their fourth number-one with "Ddu-Du Ddu-Du". The girl group claimed the second-place record the following year when they earned their fifth number-one single with "Kill This Love", which rose to the top of the chart on the issue dated April 20, 2019.
- Wizkid, Burna Boy, Mr Eazi, Tems, Rema, and Asake are the only Nigerian artists to reach number one on the chart. Of the six, Wizkid, Mr. Eazi, Tems, and Asake are the only artists to debut in the lead position. Wizkid was the first to do so, debuting atop the chart in November 2018 as a featured artist on the song "Checklist" by Normani and Calvin Harris. Mr Eazi earned his number-one debut in 2020 with the Major Lazer collaboration single "Oh My Gawd" featuring Nicki Minaj and K4mo. Tems debuted at number one in August 2022, with her cover of "No Woman, No Cry" from the Wakanda Forever Prologue extended play. Asake debuted at number one in August 2024 with "Active", a collaboration single with Travis Scott.
- Hwasa is the first female K-pop solo artist to have two songs simultaneously enter the top-10 of the chart. Her songs "I'm a B" and "Bless U" debuted at numbers 7 and 10 respectively on the issue dated December 4, 2021.
- Agust D, J-Hope, and Jin are the only solo artists in the history of the chart to simultaneously occupy the top three positions. Agust D did it with "Daechwita", "Strange", and "Burn It" on the chart issue dated June 6, 2020; J-Hope did it with "Arson", "= (Equal Sign)", and "Safety Zone" on the chart issue dated July 30, 2022; and Jin did it with "Super Tuna", "Abyss", and "Tonight" on the chart issue dated November 5, 2022. Since then, Jin has additionally achieved the feat on the November 30, 2024, (Note: Jin occupied the top five positions on the chart simultaneously following the release of his debut EP Happy.) and May 31, 2025, issues, (Note: Jin occupied the top six positions on the chart simultaneously following the release of his second EP Echo.) making him the only solo artist to do so thrice.
- SB19 is the first Filipino band to appear on the chart. Their song "Gento" debuted at number eight on the chart issue dated June 3, 2023. Their single "Dam" debuted at number one on the March 15, 2025 issue, making them the first Filipino act to top the chart.
