= BTS World =

2019 video game

- Developer: Takeone Company Corp
- Publisher: Netmarble
- Platforms: iOS, Android
- Release: June 26, 2019
- Genre: Visual novel
- Mode: Single-player

BTS World (stylized in all caps) is a mobile video game developed by South Korean studio Takeone Company Corp and published by Netmarble. Players take the role of BTS' manager, going through various journeys with each of the seven members from 2012, before their debut, to 2019.

On September 2023, it was announced the game ended the service on December 26, 2023.

On December 1st of 2024, the revamp of the BTS World was announced, subtitled as "Season 2". Most of the contents from original has preserved to the "Season 2". However, unlike the original, the sequel presenting the puzzle gameplay mechanics with card-collecting elements, with brand new features like casual spaces called "BTS Land". It is launched on December 17, 2024.

== Release ==
The game was released to iOS and Android systems in over 175 countries on June 26, 2019.

== Gameplay ==
BTS World is a visual novel where most of the story relies on clicking through interactions between the user and game characters. The game is based on conversations and choices that impact the later chapters. The player can also style the characters and play a card game to achieve a specific score.

The game uses real photos and voice recordings of the BTS members. Its official website has galleries of photos and videos of the members as the game characters.

Another mode, Another Story, has similar gameplay but different stories, as each focuses on the player and only one member of BTS as if they were not together back then.

== Characters ==
Based on the descriptions on the game's official website, there are seven different characters in "Another Story".

| Name | Occupation |
|---|---|
| Kim Namjoon (RM) | Creative writing & literature student caught up in a real case |
| Kim Seokjin (Jin) | Hotel intern who tries taking care of a special guest |
| Min Yoongi (Suga) | Piano student working hard to win a competition |
| Jeong Hoseok (J-Hope) | Veterinary medicine student who starts taking care of an animal sanctuary |
| Park Jimin (Jimin) | High school student trying to take care of his grandmother's rice cake shop |
| Kim Taehyung (V) | High school student trying out farming |
| Jeon JungKook (Jungkook) | High school student trying to revive a Taekwondo club |

== Development and release ==
BTS World was developed by TakeOne Company and published by Netmarble. It was developed for two years. Netmarble claimed that the group's strong fanbase "leads to a good potential market for creating a brand-new game." The game is based on the members' true personalities.

The game was released worldwide on 26 June 2019.

== Soundtrack ==
The game features original music from the group. An accompanying soundtrack album, BTS World: Original Soundtrack, was released worldwide on June 28, 2019.

The soundtrack was supported by three collaboration singles: "Dream Glow" by Jin, Jimin, and Jungkook featuring British singer Charli XCX (June 7), "A Brand New Day" by J-Hope and V featuring Swedish singer Zara Larsson (June 14), and "All Night" by RM and Suga featuring American rapper Juice Wrld (June 21). On June 26, the game's official theme song and the soundtrack's lead single, "Heartbeat", was revealed in-game after its release.

== Reception ==
=== Pre-release ===
Before being released, the game received significant media coverage. CNBC said the game "will offer opportunities for microtransactions." MTV reports for people who are not familiar with the band, "the game could become a powerful learning tool for anyone just getting into their music."

=== Awards ===
| Year | Organization | Award | Result | Ref. |
|---|---|---|---|---|
| 2019 | Golden Joystick Awards | Mobile Game of the Year | Won | |
| 2019 | Google Play Korea Users' Choice Awards | Users' Choice Game | Nominated | |
| 2019 | Korea Game Awards | Good Game Award | Won | |
