= BTS World: Original Soundtrack =

2019 mobile game soundtrack album by various artists

Soundtrack album by BTS / various artists (Note: The soundtrack is credited to "BTS" in sources such as Gaon, Oricon, and Amazon, but to "various artists" in other sources such as Spotify and iTunes.)
- Released: June 28, 2019
- Length: 40:04
- Languages: Korean; English
- Labels: Big Hit; Take One Company; kakao M
- Producers: Stargate; Mura Masa; RM; Powers Pleasant; DJ Swivel

BTS chronology
Map of the Soul: Persona (2019)	BTS World: Original Soundtrack (2019)	Map of the Soul: 7 (2020)

Singles from BTS World: Original Soundtrack
- 1. "Dream Glow" Released: June 7, 2019; 2. "A Brand New Day" Released: June 14, 2019; 3. "All Night" Released: June 21, 2019; 4. "Heartbeat" Released: June 28, 2019

Professional ratings
Review scores
Source	Rating
Pitchfork	4.6/10

BTS World: Original Soundtrack is the soundtrack album for the mobile game of the same name developed by Netmarble. Released on June 28, 2019, two days after the mobile game's release, the album features four singles by South Korean boy band BTS and instrumentals from the game. Its release was preceded by the singles "Dream Glow" (a collaboration with British singer Charli XCX), "A Brand New Day" (a collaboration with Swedish singer Zara Larsson) and "All Night" (a collaboration with American rapper and singer Juice Wrld). On June 26, the song "Heartbeat" was revealed in the game after its release. The album debuted atop the Gaon Album Chart and the Spanish Albums chart, representing the band's first album to reach the No. 1 spot in Spain. It also debuted at No. 2 on the Billboard Top Soundtracks chart in the United States and became the first K-pop soundtrack album to be featured on this chart. Having debuted at No. 26 on the all-genre Billboard 200, it is the highest-charting game soundtrack ever in the United States, and one of only three game soundtracks to have reached the Top 50 since the Billboard 200 began publishing weekly in March 1956.

== Background and release ==
An original soundtrack featuring new music from BTS for the group's then upcoming BTS World mobile game was first announced on June 4, 2019 (in South Korea, June 5 elsewhere). An unnamed-at-the-time sub-unit song by members Jin, Jimin, and Jungkook, would precede the soundtrack's release on June 7.

On June 10, 2019, links to various Korean e-commerce sites where physical editions of the soundtrack could be pre-ordered were shared via the group's company Twitter account. A subsequent link for global purchasing via Weply was shared from the platform's official Twitter account. Album pre-orders began that same day.

On June 27, it was revealed that the official album would have a total of 14 songs, including the three main singles, background music, and 7 solo "theme" songs. It was also revealed that there would be a music video released with the single "Heartbeat", which is the lead track on the album.

=== Singles ===
Three singles preceded the album's release. The first single "Dream Glow", a collaboration with British singer Charli XCX, was released on June 7, 2019. The second single, "A Brand New Day" with Swedish singer Zara Larsson, was released on June 14. The third single, "All Night" with American rapper Juice Wrld, was released on June 21.

A fourth single, "Heartbeat", was initially released in-game on June 26, and then globally on June 28 when digital and physical versions of the album became available. An accompanying music video, featuring concert footage of the group and scenes from the game, was simultaneously released with the track.

== Track listing ==
All tracks produced by Kang Minkook, except where noted.

CD version
No.	Title	Writer(s)	Producer(s)	Length
1.	"Heartbeat"	Coyle Girelli; J-Hope; Lee Hyun; RM; Bang Si-hyuk	DJ Swivel	4:13
2.	"Dream Glow" (with Charli XCX)	Stargate; Charli XCX; Ryn Weaver; Bobby Chung	Stargate	3:07
3.	"A Brand New Day" (with Zara Larsson)	Larsson; J-Hope; Yoo Gi-ta; Mura Masa; Max Wolfgang; Scott Quinn	Mura Masa	3:25
4.	"All Night" (with Juice Wrld)	RM; Suga; Juice Wrld; Powers Pleasant; Marric Strobert	RM; Powers Pleasant	3:36
5.	"Captain" (Namjun theme)	Kang Minkook; Brandon Jung		3:19
6.	"Cake Waltz" (Jimin theme)	Minkook; Lim Hyunji		3:44
7.	"Shine" (Yunki theme)	Jung		3:52
8.	"Not Alone" (Jeongguk theme)	Minkook; Hyunji		3:45
9.	"Friends" (Hoseok theme)	Jung		3:30
10.	"Wish" (Seok Jin theme)	Minkook		3:57
11.	"Flying" (Taehyung theme)	Skylar Nam; Victor Kong		3:36
Total length:				40:04

Digital version
No.	Title	Writer(s)	Length
12.	"LaLaLa" (performed by Okdal)	Minkook; Jung Jichan	3:11
13.	"You Are Here" (performed by Lee Hyun)	Minkook; Jichan	3:36
14.	"You Are Here" (instrumental)	Minkook; Jichan	3:36
Total length:			50:27

== Charts ==
=== Weekly charts ===
Weekly chart performance
Chart (2019)	Peak position
Argentine Albums (CAPIF)	15
Australian Albums (ARIA)	55
Austrian Albums (Ö3 Austria)	16
Belgian Albums (Ultratop Flanders)	19
Belgian Albums (Ultratop Wallonia)	48
Canadian Albums (Billboard)	58
Danish Albums (Hitlisten)	37
Dutch Albums (Album Top 100)	24
Finnish Albums (Suomen virallinen lista)	16
French Albums (SNEP)	16
German Albums (Offizielle Top 100)	7
Hungarian Albums (MAHASZ)	9
Italian Albums (FIMI)	38
Japanese Albums (Oricon)	4
Japanese Hot Albums (Billboard Japan)	40
Lithuanian Albums (AGATA)	8
New Zealand Albums (RMNZ)	16
Polish Albums (ZPAV)	2
Scottish Albums (Official Charts)	91
South Korean Albums (Gaon)	1
Spanish Albums (Promusicae)	1
Swiss Albums (Schweizer Hitparade)	6
US Billboard 200	26
US Top Soundtracks (Billboard)	2
US World Albums (Billboard)	1

=== Monthly charts ===
Monthly chart performance
Chart (2019)	Peak position
Japanese Albums (Oricon)	8
South Korean Albums (Gaon)	1

=== Year-end charts ===
Year-end chart performance
Chart (2019)	Position
Hungarian Albums (MAHASZ)	89
Japanese Albums (Oricon)	72
South Korean Albums (Gaon)	5

== Certifications ==
Certifications
Region	Certification	Certified units/sales
South Korea (KMCA)	2× Platinum	500,000^{^}
^{^} Shipments figures based on certification alone.
