= Dream Glow =

Single by BTS and Charli XCX

from the album BTS World: Original Soundtrack
- Language: Korean; English
- Released: June 7, 2019
- Genre: EDM
- Length: 3:07
- Label: Big Hit; TakeOne
- Songwriters: Charlotte Aitchison; Erin Wüthrich; Mikkel Storleer Eriksen; Tor Erik Hermansen; Bobby Jung
- Producer: Stargate

BTS singles chronology
| "Boy with Luv" (2019) | "Dream Glow" (2019) | "A Brand New Day" (2019) |

Charli XCX singles chronology
| "Spicy" (2019) | "Dream Glow" (2019) | "XXXTC" (2019) |

"Dream Glow" is a song by Jin, Jimin and Jung Kook of the South Korean boy band BTS and British singer Charli XCX, released as a single on June 7, 2019. It was produced by Stargate, and is the first song from the soundtrack of their BTS World game, released on June 26.

== Background ==
"Dream Glow" is a reworked version of an unreleased Charli XCX song that was titled "Glow". "Glow" was written in 2016 during writing sessions for her unreleased third studio album. Charli XCX initially planned to include the song on the album, but ultimately decided not to as she stated that "it never quite fit in my world in its original form".

In 2017, Charli XCX met BTS in Seoul, South Korea, when she was in the country performing for the Pentaport Rock Festival. During their meeting, they decided to work on a song together. Charli XCX would later send them her version of "Glow" as a potential song to use, and it was eventually chosen as the song for their collaboration. The group "sat with it for a while" in order to tweak the song and also adapt it to fit the Korean language.

Charli XCX's version of the song leaked in 2018. Charli XCX stated that the song was originally about "falling in love with someone in the club [because] they had that "glow" about them".

The song is credited as being "part one" of the soundtrack to the Netmarble mobile game BTS World.

== Critical reception ==
Sheldon Pearce of Pitchfork gave the track a positive review, saying Jin, Jimin and Jung Kook "don't miss a beat, with Charli filling the vacant spaces to maintain their carefully arranged synchronicity". Pearce also said that the four "sing vaguely but assuredly, in English and Korean, about the yet-to-be-realized potential of dreams", calling it "starry-eyed but not fanciful", "nearly pessimist-proof" and "pristine EDM-lite".

== Track listing ==
Digital download
| No. | Title | Length |
|---|---|---|
| 1. | "Dream Glow (BTS World Original Soundtrack) [Part 1]" (with Charli XCX) | 3:07 |

== Charts ==
| Chart (2019) | Peak position |
|---|---|
| Australia (ARIA) | 77 |
| Euro Digital Song Sales (Billboard) | 18 |
| Finland Digital Song Sales (Billboard) | 3 |
| France Downloads (SNEP) | 30 |
| Greece International Digital (IFPI) | 41 |
| Hungary (Single Top 40) | 3 |
| Ireland (IRMA) | 63 |
| Lithuania (AGATA) | 46 |
| Malaysia (RIM) | 4 |
| New Zealand Hot Singles (RMNZ) | 7 |
| Scottish Singles Sales (Official Charts) | 18 |
| Singapore (RIAS) | 27 |
| South Korea (Gaon) | 75 |
| Sweden Heatseeker (Sverigetopplistan) | 10 |
| Switzerland (Schweizer Hitparade) | 89 |
| UK Singles (Official Charts) | 61 |
| UK Independent Singles (OCC) | 8 |
| US Bubbling Under Hot 100 (Billboard) | 6 |

== Release history ==
| Region | Date | Format | Label | Ref. |
|---|---|---|---|---|
| Various | 7 June 2019 | Digital download; streaming | Big Hit; TakeOne | |
