= A Brand New Day (BTS and Zara Larsson song) =

Single by BTS and Zara Larsson

from the album BTS World: Original Soundtrack
- Language: Korean; English
- Released: June 14, 2019
- Length: 3:25
- Label: Big Hit; TakeOne
- Songwriters: J-Hope; Yoo Gi-ta; Zara Larsson; Alexander George Edward Crossan; Max Wolfgang; Scott Quinn
- Producer: Mura Masa

BTS singles chronology
"Dream Glow" (2019)	"A Brand New Day" (2019)	"All Night" (2019)

Zara Larsson singles chronology
"Now You're Gone" (2019)	"A Brand New Day" (2019)	"All the Time" (2019)

Audio video
- "A Brand New Day" on YouTube

"A Brand New Day" is a song by J-Hope and V of South Korean boy band BTS and Swedish singer Zara Larsson, released on June 14, 2019, as the second single from the BTS World: Original Soundtrack. It was produced by Mura Masa.

== Background ==
"A Brand New Day" has been described as an "electronic hip-hop song", with instrumentation featuring a prominent daegeum, a Korean bamboo flute, and producer Mura Masa providing an accompanying beat.

== Track listing ==
Digital download
No.	Title	Length
1.	"A Brand New Day (BTS World Original Soundtrack) [Part 2]" (with Zara Larsson)	3:25

== Charts ==
Chart (2019)	Peak position
Canadian Digital Songs (Billboard)	30
Finland Digital Song Sales (Billboard)	3
France Downloads (SNEP)	34
Greece International Digital (IFPI)	79
Hungary (Single Top 40)	7
Lithuania (AGATA)	90
Malaysia (RIM)	12
New Zealand Hot Singles (RMNZ)	19
Scottish Singles Sales (Official Charts)	36
South Korea (Gaon)	103
Sweden Heatseeker (Sverigetopplistan)	9
UK Download Singles (OCC)	29
UK Independent Singles (OCC)	17
US Digital Songs (Billboard)	25

== Release history ==
Region	Date	Format	Label	Ref.
Various	14 June 2019	Digital download; streaming	Big Hit; TakeOne	
