= All Night (BTS and Juice Wrld song) =

Single by BTS and Juice Wrld

from the album BTS World: Original Soundtrack
- Language: Korean; English
- Released: June 21, 2019
- Length: 3:36
- Label: Big Hit; TakeOne
- Songwriter(s): Jarad Higgins; Marric Antonio Strobert; Powers Pleasant; Kim Nam-joon; Min Yoon-gi
- Producer(s): Powers Pleasant

BTS singles chronology
"A Brand New Day" (2019)	"All Night" (2019)	"Heartbeat" (2019)

Juice Wrld singles chronology
"Hear Me Calling" (2019)	"All Night" (2019)	"Hate Me" (2019)

"All Night" is a song by RM and Suga of the South Korean boy band BTS and American rapper Juice Wrld, released on June 21, 2019. It is the third single to be taken from the BTS World: Original Soundtrack, and was produced by RM.

== Background ==
The song was described as a "moderate tempo hip hop song with a 90's chill vibe". It also features beats produced by Powers Pleasant.

== Track listing ==
Digital download
No.	Title	Length
1.	"All Night (BTS World Original Soundtrack) [Part 3]" (with Juice Wrld)	3:36

== Charts ==
Chart (2019)	Peak position
France (SNEP)	32
Greece International Digital (IFPI)	100
Hungary (Single Top 40)	13
New Zealand Hot Singles (RMNZ)	17
Scotland (OCC)	47
South Korea (Gaon)	102
UK Download Singles (OCC)	37
UK Independent Singles (OCC)	40
US Bubbling Under Hot 100 (Billboard)	18

== Release history ==
Region	Date	Format	Label	Ref.
Various	21 June 2019	Digital download; streaming	Big Hit; TakeOne	
