= Heartbeat (BTS song) =

Single by BTS

from the album BTS World: Original Soundtrack
- Language: Korean
- Released: June 28, 2019
- Genre: Pop rock
- Length: 4:13
- Label: Big Hit; TakeOne
- Songwriters: Coyle Girelli; Jordan Young; Jung Ho-seok; Lee Hyun; Kim Nam-joon; Bang Si-hyuk
- Producer: DJ Swivel

BTS singles chronology
| "All Night" (2019) | "Heartbeat" (2019) | "Lights" (2019) |

Music video
- "Heartbeat" on YouTube

"Heartbeat" is a song by South Korean boy band BTS, released on June 28, 2019, as the fourth and main single from and in tandem with the album BTS World: Original Soundtrack. A music video was released alongside the song.

== Background ==
The song is described as having a "pop-rock melody" featuring the group's "dulcet vocals" as well as lyrics about destiny, which were also called a "love letter" to the group's fans. The song was revealed in the game prior to the soundtrack's release, but players had to first reach mission 14 of the first chapter to listen to it.

== Music video ==
The music video was also released on June 28, featuring "fantasy-meets-reality visuals which sees all seven members on their own journeys". It has been described as intermedial and self-reflexive.

== Charts ==
| Chart (2019) | Peak position |
|---|---|
| Australia Digital Tracks (ARIA) | 32 |
| Canada Hot 100 (Billboard) | 82 |
| Hungary (Single Top 40) | 4 |
| Lithuania (AGATA) | 89 |
| Malaysia (RIM) | 6 |
| New Zealand Hot Singles (RMNZ) | 19 |
| Scottish Singles Sales (Official Charts) | 36 |
| Singapore (RIAS) | 8 |
| South Korea (Gaon) | 62 |
| UK Singles Downloads (Official Charts) | 31 |
| UK Indie (Official Charts) | 39 |
| US Bubbling Under Hot 100 (Billboard) | 7 |
