= Coping Mechanisms (Tayla Parx album) =

Studio album by Tayla Parx
- Released: November 20, 2020
- Genre: Pop; electropop; R&B
- Length: 31:02
- Label: Taylamade, Inc. / Atlantic
- Producer: Tayla Parx; Dem Jointz; Fredrik Sixten; Haze; Hiko Momoji; Gitty; Junior Oliver Frid; Mattman & Robin; Oscar Görres; TBHits; Tushar Apte; Void Stryker; Wynne Bennett; xSDTRK

Tayla Parx chronology
A Blue State (2020)	Coping Mechanisms (2020)	Many Moons, Many Suns (2024)

Singles from Coping Mechanisms
- 1. "Dance Alone" Released: May 18, 2020; 2. "Residue" Released: October 16, 2020; 3. "Fixerupper" Released: November 13, 2020; 4. "System" Released: November 20, 2020; 5. "Sad" Released: March 4, 2021

Professional ratings
Review scores
Source	Rating
The Guardian	4/5 stars
Dork	4/5 stars
The Forty-Five	3.5/5 stars

Coping Mechanisms is the second studio album by American singer-songwriter Tayla Parx. It was released on November 20, 2020 through Atlantic Records.

== Track listing ==
Coping Mechanisms track listing

No.	Title	Writer(s)	Producer(s)	Length
1.	"Sad"	Taylor Parks; Kameron Glasper; James Norton; Wynne Bennett; Fredrik Sixten	Bennett; Sixten	2:42
2.	"Dance Alone"	Parks; Glasper; Lara Andersson; Oscar Gorres; Jeff Gitelman	OzGo; Gitty	2:33
3.	"System"	Parks; Glasper; Dwayne Abernathy Jr.	Dem Jointz	3:02
4.	"Stare"	Parks; Glasper; Robin Oliver Frid; Bennett	Bennett; Tayla Parx; Oliver Frid	2:18
5.	"Fixerupper"	Parks; Nija Charles; Alexandra Tamposi; Tommy Brown; Tushar Apte	TBHits; Apte	2:34
6.	"Bricks"	Parks; Glasper; Abernathy Jr.	Dem Jointz	2:54
7.	"Residue"	Parks; Andersson; Mattias Larsson; Robin Fredriksson	Mattman & Robin	2:26
8.	"Justified" (featuring Tank and The Bangas)	Parks; Glasper; Bennett; Tarriona Ball; Albert Allenback	Bennett	3:24
9.	"Nonchalant"	Parks; Amanda Lucille Warner; Hiko Momoji; Void Stryker; Yonatan Ayal	Momoji; Stryker; XSDTRK	1:27
10.	"Nevermind"	Parks; Andersson; Norton; Frid; Bennett	Bennett; Frid	2:43
11.	"Last Words"	Parks; Glasper; Norton; Bennett	Bennett; Parx	2:47
12.	"You Don't Know"	Parks; Glasper; Abernathy Jr.; Rashad Muhammad	Dem Jointz; Haze	2:12
Total length:				31:02
