= Many Moons, Many Suns =

Studio album by Tayla Parx
- Released: July 12, 2024
- Genres: Soul; country; pop; rock; house; R&B
- Length: 32:56
- Label: TaylaMade

Tayla Parx chronology
Coping Mechanisms (2020)	Many Moons, Many Suns (2024)

Singles from Many Moons, Many Suns album
- 1. "Rich" Released: April 29, 2022; 2. "Flowers" Released: June 29, 2022; 3. "For What It's Worth" Released: November 18, 2022; 4. "Dream Hotel" Released: March 17, 2023; 5. "Something in My Eye" Released: August 18, 2023; 6. "Celebration Weight" Released: November 16, 2023; 7. "Era" Released: June 14, 2024

Many Moons, Many Suns is the third studio album by Tayla Parx. It was released on July 12, 2024 on TaylaMade.

== Background ==
Parx began working on Many Moons, Many Suns in 2020, shortly after completing her second album, Coping Mechanisms. The album is about a breakup. She wrote and recorded songs as she was inspired, releasing the album singles "Celebration Weight," "Flowers", "Eras", and "Dream Hotel" between 2021 and 2024.

Parx released her first two albums on the TaylaMade imprint in conjunction with Atlantic Records. She chose to release Many Moon's, Many Suns independently on her label, TaylaMade.

== Critical reception ==
In Rolling Stone, Brittany Spanos wrote that the album was the "culmination of a few years’ worth of life lived to its fullest," and described the single "Eras" as "raucous, catchy, and empowering." A review in People described Many Moons, Many Suns as a "vulnerable, genre-bending project."

=== Track listing ===
All tracks are written by Tayla Parx.

Many Moons, Many Suns track listing
No.	Title	Writer(s)	Producer(s)	Length
1.	"Dream Hotel"	Tayla Parx; Lara Andersson	Parx; Oliver Frid; Heavy Mellow	2:37
2.	"This Was Supposed to Be Our Wedding Song"	Parx; Andersson	Parx	1:58
3.	"Something in My Eye"	Parx; Andersson; Em Walcott; Kam Parker	Parx; Gustav Landell; Patrick Wimberly	2:44
4.	"Flowers"	Parx; Wynne Bennett; Parker	Parx; Bennett	2:48
5.	"Celebration Weight"	Parx; Walcott; Dan Fernandez; Landell	Parx; Dan Fernandez; Landell	2:08
6.	"For What It's Worth"	Parx; Walcott	Parx; Albin Tengblad; Daoud	2:31
7.	"Gentlewoman"	Parx	Parx; Spencer Stewart	2:35
8.	"Rich"	Parx; Justin Tranter; Sam Homaee; Jon Wienner; Justus West	Parx; The Roommates; West	2:57
9.	"Emotional Support Ex"	Parx; Parker	Parx; Fernandez	1:51
10.	"Standing Up to the Wind"	Parx; Parker; Yonatan Ayal	Parx; XSDTRK	2:18
11.	"Era" (Featuring Tkay Maidza)	Parx; Ayal	Parx; XSDTRK	2:13
12.	"10s"	Parx; Parker	Parx; XSDTRK	2:57
13.	"I Don't Talk About Texas"	Parx; Sid Dorey; Corook	Parx; Fernandez	3:19
Total length:				32:56
