= Mic drop =

Gesture of dropping a microphone

A mic drop is the gesture of intentionally dropping one's microphone at the end of a performance or speech to signal triumph. Figuratively, it is an expression of triumph for a successful event and indicates a boastful attitude toward one's own performance.

== History ==
President Barack Obama's mic drop at the 2016 White House Correspondents' Dinner

The gesture with a microphone became prevalent in the 1980s, when it was used by rappers and comedians. The context could be a rap battle or a comedian interacting with a heckler — and dropping the microphone after a particularly effective line indicated complete confidence in the opponent's inability to come back with anything that would be worthy of a response. An early occurrence was Eddie Murphy in 1983 in his standup show Delirious. He did it again in his 1988 film Coming to America after a musical performance of “The Greatest Love of All” when playing the character Randy Watson.

The gesture gained increased popularity from 2012. US President Barack Obama performed a mic drop on Late Night with Jimmy Fallon, which has been credited with popularising the meme. Then at the White House Correspondents' Dinner on April 30, 2016, Obama ended his speech with the words "Obama out", then dropped a mic, evoking a speech by the then retiring NBA basketball player Kobe Bryant, who had ended his speech with the words "mamba out" at the end of his last game on April 14, 2016. In 2017, RM, the leader of boy band BTS, revealed that the track "Mic Drop" from their extended play Love Yourself: Her was inspired by Obama's speech. A figurative use also features in a promotional video for the Invictus Games featuring Obama and the British royal family.

Google introduced a "mic drop" feature to Gmail on April 1, 2016, as an April Fools' Day joke, allowing users to send a GIF of a Minion dropping a microphone as a reply to any email. If used, the feature also prevented the sender from seeing any subsequent replies that the recipient sent. The feature was removed within hours after Google received complaints from some users, with some reporting that they lost their job as a result of accidentally using it.
