= Synthetic Soul =

EP by Chiiild
- Released: February 28, 2020
- Genres: Experimental; R&B; psychedelic soul; indie electronic
- Length: 22:34
- Labels: Avant Garden; Island
- Producers: xSDTRK; Pierre-Luc Rioux

Chiiild chronology
Synthetic Soul (2020)	Hope for Sale (2021)

Singles from Synthetic Soul
- 1. "Count Me Out" Released: July 31, 2019; 2. "Back to Life" Released: September 13, 2019; 3. "Darling" Released: November 13, 2019; 4. "Hands Off Me" Released: January 22, 2020

Synthetic Soul is the debut extended play by Canadian experimental soul band Chiiild. It was released on February 28, 2020, by Avant Garden and Island Records. The EP exemplifies the band's blend of soul, r&b, psychedelia, jazz, indie, and pop. It also features a sole guest appearance from Zimbabwean American singer and songwriter Shungudzo.

== Release and promotion ==
Synthetic Soul was officially released for digital download and streaming on February 28, 2020, by Avant Garden and Island Records. A short documentary film of the same name—shot by Peter Hou at Wild Studio, in Saint-Zénon, Quebec—was released on May 14, 2020. The film exhibits the remote haven in which the EP was created and introduces the band's empirical approach to songwriting.

=== Singles ===
"Count Me Out" was released on July 31, 2019, as the EP's lead single. It received world premiere support from Rory Farrell on The Joe Budden Podcast. The EP's second single, "Back to Life", featured Shungudzo and premiered on Zane Lowe's Beats 1 radio show on September 13, 2019. "Darling" was released as the third single on November 13, 2019. The fourth single, "Hands Off Me", was released on January 22, 2020.

On July 22, 2020, a stripped version of "Pirouette" was released as a promotional single. It was synced on ABC's Grey's Anatomy, airing on the seventeenth season's fifth episode, "Fight the Power," on December 10, 2020.

== Critical reception ==
Upon its release, Synthetic Soul's sound was widely acclaimed by music critics. In speaking about the band's artistry, Krista Apardian of Ones to Watch proclaimed that the EP's "delicate balance of smooth retro soul, psychedelia, and modern R&B" produced "an entrancing mix of old and new." Writing for Lyrical Lemonade discography, Lucas Garrison commended the EP's introspective lyrics, claiming that "[Chiiild] really succeed in blending experimentation with emotion." While commenting on the saturation of experimental R&B in indie music, Dominiq Robinson of HotNewHipHop positively distinguished Synthetic Soul's textural production—calling it a sonic "blueprint" in the use of "ambient synth pads, funky basslines, lo-fi drum sequencing, and reverb-heavy vocals".

In addition to Synthetic Soul's positive reception, Chiiild has been listed as an "Artist to Watch" by media outlets such as Pigeons & Planes, The Line of Best Fit, Paste Magazine, Exclaim!, and Spotify's global emerging-artist program, RADAR.

=== Accolades ===
"Hands Off Me" was shortlisted for Triple J's Hottest 100 on December 8, 2020. On December 15, Chiiild received their first Song of the Year nomination, for "Pirouette", at WTB's inaugural We The Beat Awards. They were announced as the winners of the award on December 28, 2020.

Year-end lists for Synthetic Soul
Publication	List	Rank	Ref.
COMPLEX^{CA}	Best Canadian Albums of 2020	11	
Time Out Montréal	Best New Montreal Albums of 2020	3	
Cult MTL	Top 10 Albums of 2020	3	
TECO APPLE	The 10 Best EPs of 2020	3	
NEXT Magazine	Top 20 Canadian Albums of 2020	N/A	
KIND Magazine	Best Albums To Vibe To 2020	N/A	

== Track listing ==
EP credits adapted from Tidal.

Synthetic Soul track listing
No.	Title	Writer(s)	Producer(s)	Length
1.	"Count Me Out"	Yonatan Ayal; Pierre-Luc Rioux; Isabelle Dunn; Lauren Malyon; Maxime Bellavance; Cole "Col3trane" Basta	xSDTRK; Pierre-Luc Rioux	3:27
2.	"Back to Life" (feat. Shungudzo)	Ayal; Rioux; Dunn; Alexandra Shungudzo Govere	xSDTRK; Rioux	3:42
3.	"Hands Off Me"	Ayal; Rioux; Dunn; Malyon; Govere	xSDTRK; Rioux	3:45
4.	"Darling"	Ayal; Rioux; Bellavance; Cameron Mitchell	xSDTRK; Rioux	2:44
5.	"Pirouette"	Ayal; Rioux; Mick Coogan	xSDTRK; Rioux	2:57
6.	"Sunday Morning"	Ayal; Rioux; Coogan; Dernst Emile II	xSDTRK; Rioux	3:12
7.	"Easy on Yourself"	Ayal; Rioux; Dunn	xSDTRK; Rioux	2:44
Total length:				22:34

== Personnel ==
Personnel credits adapted from AllMusic.

- Yonatan "xSDTRK" Ayal – vocals, production, recording engineer, bass, keyboards
- Pierre-Luc Rioux – production, recording engineer, guitar
- Alexandra Shungudzo Govere – featured artist
- Isabelle "Izzi" Dunn – strings
- Lauren "LYON" Malyon – strings
- Maxime Bellavance – drums
- John "J-Banga" Kercy – mixing
- Chris Gehringer – mastering

== Release history ==
Region	Date	Format(s)	Label	UPC	Ref.
Worldwide	February 28, 2020	digital download • streaming	Avant Garden • Island	6-02508-28947-7	
