= Tayla Parx =

American singer and actress (born 1993)

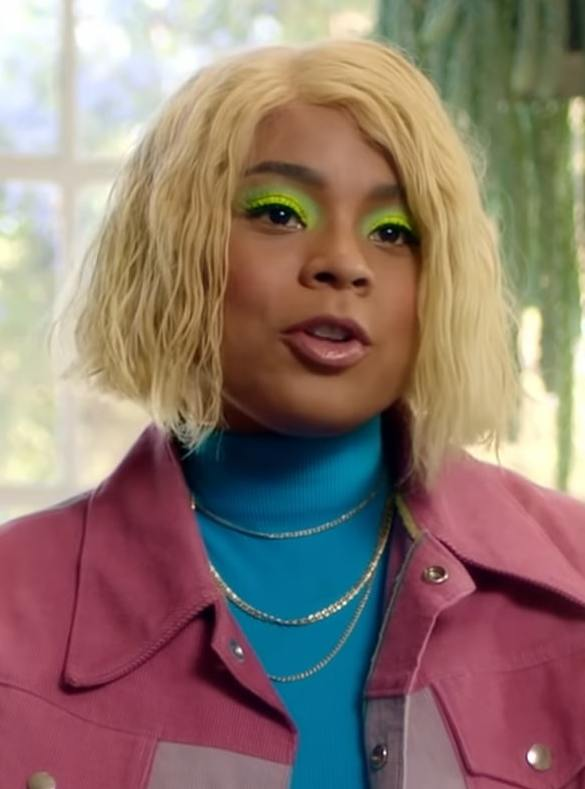
- Parks in 2019

Background information
- Born: Taylor Monét Parks; September 16, 1993 (age 33); Dallas, Texas, U.S.
- Genres: R&B; pop; hip hop; country; urban contemporary; soul; Latin alternative; K-pop
- Occupations: Songwriter; singer; actress; entrepreneur
- Years active: 2006–present
- Labels: Atlantic; Def Jam; TaylaMade
- Website: taylaparx.com

Taylor Monét Parks (born September 16, 1993), known professionally as Tayla Parx, is an American singer, songwriter, entrepreneur, and actress. A two-time Grammy nominee in the Album of the Year category, songs she has written and co-written have exceeded 16 billion streams on Spotify and appeared on the pop, hip hop, R&B, K-pop, country, and Latin charts. She has released four albums, an EP, and a mixtape as a solo artist.

Born in Dallas, Texas, Parx took singing, dance, and classical piano lessons growing up, and wrote her first songs as a child. At 9, she was enrolled at the Debbie Allen Dance Academy, where, at Allen's urging, she began to act. Her family moved to Los Angeles in 2005, and in 2006 she was cast in her first television show. In 2007, she appeared as Little Inez Stubbs in the film Hairspray.

Parx was signed to Warner Chappell Music when she was 19. Her first hit as a songwriter was on Fifth Harmony's single "Boss". In 2018, three songs she co-wrote all appeared simultaneously on the Billboard Hot 100: Khalid and Normani's "Love Lies", Ariana Grande's "Thank U, Next", and Panic! at the Disco's "High Hopes". In 2021, with Dan + Shay's "Glad You Exist", she became the fourth Black woman to write a #1 country song in the history of the genre's airplay charts.

In 2017, Parx debuted as a solo artist with the mixtape, TaylaMade, It was followed by the full-length albums We Need to Talk (2019), Coping Mechanisms (2020), and Many Moons, Many Suns (2024). She also released A Blue State, a three-song collection of covers, in 2020.

Parx is the founder of TaylaMade, Inc, a company that acts as an umbrella organization for Parx Publishing, a joint venture with Warner Chappell Music; 3020 Management, a management company for artists, writers, and producers; Trailer Parx, a lifestyle brand; Parx Studios, a creative collective; and TaylaMade Records, an independent record label.

== Early life and education ==
Parx was born Taylor Monét Parks in Texas, and grew up in Dallas before moving to Los Angeles at the age of 13. Her mother worked in IT and her father in mortgage underwriting. She sang before she could speak, and as a young child, her grandmother—a pianist—sang lullabies to teach her to harmonize.

Music was a central focus of Parx's upbringing. She sang in church, and took dance, voice, and classical piano lessons. She began writing songs in elementary school. She loved Missy Elliott, who later introduced Parx to songwriting as a profession through her work with Aaliyah.

Planning to concentrate on dance, Parx began attending Debbie Allen's Dance Academy in 2002. Allen was enthusiastic about Parx's talent, and in addition to dancing, she encouraged her to act.

== Career ==
=== Early career: Lincoln Center, Hairspray, Nickelodeon ===
With her parents' permission, Allen brought Parx to Washington, DC, and from the age of nine until she was eleven, she performed at Lincoln Center as the narrator in a stage adaptation of Allen's book, Dancing in the Wings.

At Allen's urging, the Parks family moved to Los Angeles in 2006. During her first year in LA, Parx was cast in Gilmore Girls and Everybody Hates Chris. Her breakthrough role was as Little Inez Stubbs in the 2007 musical remake of the film Hairspray. She subsequently appeared on television shows including Nickelodeon's True Jackson, VP and Victorious. She met Ariana Grande, who starred in Victorious, at Nickelodeon.

=== 2012–2016: Warner Chappell, "BO$$", "Solo Yo" ===
Feeling that she had become pigeonholed as an actor, in 2013 Parx decided to take a break from film and television. Refocused on music, she learned to engineer and began studying entertainment law. At 17, she met Babyface, who became a mentor, and at 19, Jon Platt signed her to a publishing deal at Warner Chappell. In a 2021 interview she said that her background as an actor helped her as a songwriter: "The art of songwriting is really being able to say, 'I'm here with you. I'm listening to you'. It was like this clash of two worlds that I loved."

In 2013, she earned her first album credit as a co-writer and co-producer on the title track of Sevyn Streeter's debut album, Call Me Crazy, But... She reconnected with Grande, and together with Tommy Brown and Victoria Monét, they wrote "My Everything", the title track of Grande's second album. She scored her first big hit as a co-writer and vocal producer on "Boss," the lead single from Fifth Harmony's debut album. Certified platinum in the US, it was on the Billboard Hot 100 or 15 weeks.

Parx voiced Sim in the video game The Sims 4 in 2014, and a year later voiced Victor Stone in the film Justice League: Gods and Monsters.

In 2015, her songs were recorded by The Internet, Pentatonix, Red Velvet, Jason Derulo, and Keyshia Cole, among others, and she was featured on "Anyway", a track co-written with Chris Brown. She also released her first single as a solo artist, "Don't Answer the Phone". In April 2016, she had her first #1 hit on the Latin Pop charts with the Sofía Reyes and Prince Royce track "Solo Yo."

=== 2017–2019: We Need to Talk, "Thank U, Next", Dirty Computer ===
Atlantic Records released Parx's TaylaMade, a mixtape composed of 20 songs and interludes, in 2017. She said she had a feeling of freedom when she stepped into the studio to work on the mixtape, knowing all she had to do was be herself. Khalid, Chiiild, and Syd were featured on TaylaMade.

Parx co-wrote the BTS song Mic Drop", released in 2017. It held the #1 spot on the Japanese K-pop charts for six weeks. The following year, she co-wrote "Like I Do" with Christina Aguilera. The track won a Grammy for Best Rap/Sung performance. Parx also co-wrote the title track of Chloe x Halle's The Kids Are Alright, (which was Grammy-nominated in the Best Contemporary Urban album category). She co-wrote four songs for Janelle Monae's Dirty Computer, taking a "deep creative storytelling dive" to help Monae tell her story. Parx received her first Grammy nomination in the album of the year category for her work on Dirty Computer.

In October 2018, Parx collaborated with Grande, Monet and Brown on the follow-up to Grande's album Sweetener. They wrote nine songs in a week, including the "internet -melting" title track, "Thank U, Next." Parx urged Grande to use the names of her exes in the song. Released in November 2018, the song hit #1 in 23 countries, becoming a "worldwide cultural moment." Parx also co-wrote "7 Rings", which hit #1 in 28 countries and became one of the best-selling songs in digital music history. Like "Thank U, Next", "7 Rings" debuted at #1 on the Hot 100.

In 2018, in addition to voicing AJ for The Walking Dead video game series, Parx had three songs simultaneously on the Billboard Hot 100: “Thank U, Next,” "High Hopes" by Panic! at the Disco, and the Khaled featuring Normani track, "Love Lies." "High Hopes," which Parx began working on at a BMI writing camp in 2016, was Panic! at the Disco's biggest hit to date, peaking at #4 on the Billboard Hot 100. "Love Lies" was a Top 10 hit in seven countries.

With her debut album, We Need to Talk, released in April 2019, Parx explored genre, gender, and feminism as well as her identity as a queer Black woman. In a review in Vice, Kristin Corry wrote that Parx's habit of "crafting 200 songs a year has made her a painfully concise songwriter, one who carefully crafts every moment of the record's 15 tracks". The review emphasized Parx's ability to both convey and elicit emotion in her songs: Corry wrote that she could "almost hear Parx's heart breaking" on one track, and that another induced anxiety "like the moment you send a risky text, and see that the other person is typing." Entertainment Weekly described the album as "equal parts swagger and vulnerability."

=== 2020–present: Coping Mechanisms, Many Moons, Many Suns ===
At the start of the COVID-19 pandemic. Parx built out her home studio, and finished her second album, Coping Mechanisms. During the 2020 presidential election cycle, she recorded A Blue State, a 3-song EP of cover songs that "captured the truths" of the moment, and "reflected society, how society was feeling." She covered Marvin Gaye's "What's Going On", Lauryn Hill's "Everything Is Everything" and Kirk Franklin's "I Smile" on A Blue State, which was released on Atlantic in October 2020.

Coping Mechanisms was released in November. In an article in Nylon, Steffanee Wang wrote that with Coping Mechanisms, Parx "turned the demons and emotional baggage that live in (Parx's) head into vibrant soundscapes of breezy disco, glitchy techno, and percussive pop."

During the pandemic, Parx produced vocals and co-wrote six songs, including "34+35" and "POV", for Grande's fifth album, Positions, while observing strict social distancing protocols. She and Grande were rarely in the same room. She was nominated for a Grammy in the Best R&B Album category for her co-write, "I'm Ready", on John Legend's Bigger Love. She received her third Album of the Year Grammy Nomination as a co-writer of "FUBT" on Haim's Women in Music Pt. III.

In 2021, she become the fourth Black woman to write a #1 country hit with "Glad You Exist", a collaboration with Dan + Shay. She received her fourth Album of the Year Grammy nomination as a songwriter on Justin Biebers Justice the same year, and in 2022 earned Grammy nominations for Best Contemporary Jazz album for her work on Not Tight, the debut album by Domi and JD Beck, and Best Traditional Pop Vocal Album for Diana Ross's Thank You.

Writing when inspiration hit, Parx began working on her third album, Many Moons, Many Suns, just after the release of Coping Mechanisms. In July 2024, she dropped the "raucous, catchy, empowering, high-energy track" "Era" (featuring Tkay Maidza). The album was released independently on TaylaMade. In Rolling Stone, Parx said: "I'm in my era of owning everything that I am, If you listen to my lyrics, I'm telling you everything that you need to know about me and what my values are as a as a human. I'm saying that when you go through those dark times, you will finally bounce back and realize that you're OK."

== TaylaMade, Inc. ==
Formally launched in 2021, Parx established TaylaMade, Inc. as an umbrella organization for her ventures. It includes Parx Studios, a creative collective that has worked with artists including Lil Nas X, Billie Eilish and Noah Cyrus; and Trailer Parx, a lifestyle brand. TaylaMade Inc. also encompasses Parx Publishing, a joint venture with Warner Chappell; 3020 Management, and TaylaMade Records. Parx Publishing and 3020 Management have signed writers and producers including Grammy nominees Oliver Frid, Kameron Glasper, and Em Walcott.

== Personal life and advocacy ==
Parx lives in Nashville. She is queer. In the mini-documentary, Who Is Tayla Parx?, she described herself as "a dog mom, a sister, a daughter, an executive, a writer and an artist."

Parx is a member of the Mechanical Licensing Collective and a founding member of The Pact, a songwriter's lobby established to end the practice of performers receiving credit and publishing rights for songs they did not write. She was appointed to the leadership committee of the Recording Academy's Black Music Collective in September 2020.

== Discography ==
=== Albums ===
| Title | Details |
|---|---|
| We Need to Talk | Released: April 5, 2019; Label: Atlantic; Format: Digital download |
| Coping Mechanisms | Released: November 20, 2020; Label: Atlantic; Format: Digital download |
| Many Moons, Many Suns | Released: July 11, 2024; Label: TaylaMade; Format: Digital download |

=== Mixtapes ===
| Title | Details |
|---|---|
| Tayla Made | Released: July 7, 2017; Label: Atlantic; Format: Digital download, Cassette |

=== Extended plays ===
| Title | Details |
|---|---|
| A Blue State | Released: October 2, 2020; Label: Atlantic; Format: Digital download |

=== Singles ===
==== As lead artist ====
List of singles with Tayla Parx as main artist
| Title | Year | Album |
|---|---|---|
| "Do Not Answer" | 2015 | Non-album singles |
| "I Love You" | 2016 | Non-album singles |
| "Bump That" | 2016 | Non-album singles |
| "Potential" | 2016 | Non-album singles |
| "Runaway" (featuring Khalid) | 2018 | Tayla Made |
| "Me vs. Us" | 2018 | We Need to Talk |
| "Slow Dancing" | 2018 | We Need to Talk |
| "I Want You" | 2019 | We Need to Talk |
| "Fight" (with Florida Georgia Line) | 2019 | Non-album single |
| "Dance Alone" | 2020 | Coping Mechanisms |
| "Residue" | 2020 | Coping Mechanisms |
| "Fixerupper" | 2020 | Coping Mechanisms |
| "System" | 2020 | Coping Mechanisms |
| "Sad" | 2021 | Coping Mechanisms |
| "Rich" | 2022 | Many Suns, Many Moons |
| "Flowers" | 2022 | Many Suns, Many Moons |
| "For What it's Worth" | 2022 | Many Suns, Many Moons |
| "Dream Hotel" | 2023 | Many Suns, Many Moons |
| "Something In My Eye" | 2023 | Many Suns, Many Moons |
| "Celebration Weight" | 2023 | Many Suns, Many Moons |
| "Era" (with Tkay Maidza) | 2024 | Many Suns, Many Moons |

==== As featured artist ====
| Title | Year | Peak chart positions | | Album |
| Title | Year | US Bub. | US R&B/ HH Dig. | Album |
|---|---|---|---|---|
| "Anyway" (Chris Brown featuring Tayla Parx) | 2015 | 7 | 25 | Royalty |
| "Your Eyes" (The Knocks featuring Tayla Parx) | 2017 | — | — | Testify |

=== Soundtrack appearances ===
Appearances by Tayla Parx on soundtrack albums
| Title | Year | Album |
|---|---|---|
| "You Can't Stop the Beat" (with cast of Hairspray) | 2007 | Hairspray |
| "Run and Tell That" (with Elijah Kelley) | 2007 | Hairspray |
| "Windows" | 2021 | Love, Victor: Season 2 |

=== Songwriting credits ===
Songs on which Tayla Parx received songwriting credit
| Title | Year | Artist | Album |
|---|---|---|---|
| "Call Me Crazy" | 2013 | Sevyn Streeter | Call Me Crazy, But... |
| "My Everything" | 2014 | Ariana Grande | My Everything |
| "All In A Day's Work" | 2014 | Danity Kane | DK3 |
| "Bye Baby" | 2014 | Danity Kane | DK3 |
| "Boss" | 2014 | Fifth Harmony | Reflection |
| "So Good" | 2014 | Jennifer Lopez | A.K.A. |
| "Glass House" | 2014 | Luke James | Luke James |
| "Rick James" | 2014 | Keyshia Cole | Point of No Return |
| "Infinity" | 2015 | Mariah Carey | Number 1 to Infinity |
| "Diamond" | 2015 | f(x) | 4 Walls |
| "Dope" | 2015 | Fifth Harmony | 7/27 |
| "Birthday" | 2015 | Elle Varner featuring 50 Cent | Non-album single |
| "Love Me Down" | 2015 | Jason Derulo | Everything is 4 |
| "Lie to Me" | 2015 | Prince Royce | Double Vision |
| "Paris On a Sunny Day" | 2015 | Prince Royce | Double Vision |
| "Campfire" | 2015 | Red Velvet | The Red |
| "Don't U Wait No More" | 2015 | Red Velvet | The Red |
| "Dumb Dumb" | 2015 | Red Velvet | The Red |
| "Just Sayin/I Tried" | 2015 | The Internet | Ego Death |
| "Special Affair" | 2015 | The Internet | Ego Death |
| "Anyway" | 2015 | Chris Brown featuring Tayla Parx | Royalty |
| "Ref" | 2015 | Pentatonix | Pentatonix |
| "Na Na Na" | 2015 | Pentatonix | Pentatonix |
| "Fuck Apologies" | 2016 | JoJo | Mad Love |
| "All the Time" | 2016 | Chris Lane | Girl Problems |
| "In Common" | 2016 | Alicia Keys | Here |
| "Set in Stone" | 2016 | Guy Sebastian | Conscious |
| "Your Eyes" (featuring Tayla Parx) | 2016 | The Knocks | Testify |
| "Better" | 2016 | Meghan Trainor | Thank You |
| "Woman Up" | 2016 | Meghan Trainor | Thank You |
| "Solo Yo" | 2017 | Sofia Reyes featuring Prince Royce | Louder |
| "Deliver" | 2017 | Fifth Harmony | Fifth Harmony |
| "Cry Baby" | 2017 | Demi Lovato | Tell Me You Love Me |
| "Just Like You" | 2017 | Fergie | Double Dutchess |
| "Asleep" | 2017 | Majid Jordan | The Space Between |
| "The Space Between" | 2017 | Majid Jordan | The Space Between |
| "Island" (featuring Tayla Parx) | 2017 | Eric Bellinger | Eric B For President: Term 2 |
| "Make You Mine" | 2017 | Emma Jensen | Non-album single |
| "Mic Drop" | 2017 | BTS featuring Desiigner | Love Yourself: Her |
| "Mic Jack" | 2017 | Big Boi featuring Adam Levine, Scar and Sleepy Brown | Boomiverse |
| "AllSheWannaDo" | 2017 | Travis Garland featuring Casey Veggies | Travis Garland |
| "Motel Pool" | 2017 | Travis Garland | Travis Garland |
| "You Made Your Bed (So Lay In It)" | 2017 | Travis Garland | Travis Garland |
| "Lolita" | 2017 | Christina Aguilera | Unreleased; leaked in 2021 |
| "Your Song" | 2018 | BoA featuring Junoflo | One Shot, Two Shot |
| "The Kids Are Alright" | 2018 | Chloe x Halle | The Kids Are Alright |
| "Love Lies" | 2018 | Khalid, Normani | Love, Simon |
| "Pynk" | 2018 | Janelle Monáe featuring Grimes | Dirty Computer |
| "I Like That" | 2018 | Janelle Monáe | Dirty Computer |
| "I Got the Juice" | 2018 | Janelle Monáe featuring Pharrell Williams | Dirty Computer |
| "Don't Judge Me" | 2018 | Janelle Monáe | Dirty Computer |
| "Accelerate" | 2018 | Christina Aguilera featuring 2 Chainz and Ty Dolla Sign | Liberation |
| "Maria" | 2018 | Christina Aguilera | Liberation |
| "Right Moves" | 2018 | Christina Aguilera featuring Keida and Shenseea | Liberation |
| "Like I Do" | 2018 | Christina Aguilera featuring GoldLink | Liberation |
| "Out of Your Mind" | 2018 | The Presets featuring Alison Wonderland | Hi Viz |
| "High Hopes" | 2018 | Panic! at the Disco | Pray for the Wicked |
| "Invited" | 2018 | Marcus & Martinus | Soon |
| "Tints" | 2018 | Anderson .Paak featuring Kendrick Lamar | Oxnard |
| "Swing" | 2018 | Quavo featuring Davido and Normani | Quavo Huncho |
| "Thank U, Next" | 2018 | Ariana Grande | Thank U, Next |
| "7 Rings" | 2019 | Ariana Grande | Thank U, Next |
| "Needy" | 2019 | Ariana Grande | Thank U, Next |
| "NASA" | 2019 | Ariana Grande | Thank U, Next |
| "Make Up" | 2019 | Ariana Grande | Thank U, Next |
| "Ghostin" | 2019 | Ariana Grande | Thank U, Next |
| "Got Her Own" | 2019 | Ariana Grande and Victoria Monét | Charlie's Angels: Original Motion Picture Soundtrack |
| "Pocket Dial" | 2019 | Marcus & Martinus | Soon |
| "Let Me Go" | 2019 | Marcus & Martinus | Soon |
| "Coffee" | 2019 | Tori Kelly | Inspired by True Events |
| "2 Places" | 2019 | Tori Kelly | Inspired by True Events |
| "Honey" | 2020 | Kesha | High Road |
| "Summer" | 2020 | Kesha | High Road |
| "Diamonds" | 2020 | Megan Thee Stallion and Normani | Birds of Prey |
| "Overshare" | 2020 | Kelsea Ballerini | Kelsea |
| "Easy To Love" | 2020 | Fleur East | Fearless |
| "I'm Ready" | 2020 | John Legend | Bigger Love |
| "Take Yourself Home" | 2020 | Troye Sivan | In a Dream |
| "Not a Pop Song" | 2020 | Little Mix | Confetti |
| "Sweet Melody" | 2020 | Little Mix | Confetti |
| "Rendezvous" | 2020 | Little Mix | Confetti |
| "Shut Up" | 2020 | Ariana Grande | Positions |
| "34+35" | 2020 | Ariana Grande | Positions |
| "My Hair" | 2020 | Ariana Grande | Positions |
| "Love Language" | 2020 | Ariana Grande | Positions |
| "POV" | 2020 | Ariana Grande | Positions |
| "Worst Behavior" | 2020 | Ariana Grande | Positions |
| "test drive" | 2020 | Ariana Grande | Positions |
| "If It Ain't Me" | 2021 | Dua Lipa | Future Nostalgia: The Moonlight Edition |
| "For Ya" | 2021 | Paloma Mami | Sueños de Dalí |
| "Step Back" | 2022 | Got the Beat | Non-album single |
| "Take A Chance" | 2022 | Domi and JD Beck | Not Tight |
| "Stamp on It" | 2023 | Got the Beat | Stamp on It |
| "Deserve Me" | 2023 | Kali Uchis | Red Moon in Venus |
| "Wallflower" | 2023 | TWICE | Ready to Be |
| "Better Man" | 2023 | Ellie Goulding | Higher Than Heaven |
| "Water Slide" | 2023 | Janelle Monáe | The Age of Pleasure |
| "Got Me Started" | 2023 | Troye Sivan | Something to Give Each Other |
| "Bad Thing" | 2023 | Jesy Nelson | TBA |
| "In My Bag" | 2024 | Flo featuring GloRilla | Access All Areas |
| "Nassau" | 2024 | Shakira | Las Mujeres Ya No Lloran |
| "Anticipate" | 2024 | Leigh-Anne Pinnock | No Hard Feelings |
| "Like Jennie" | 2025 | Jennie | Ruby |
| "I Hate Your Ex-Girlfriend" | 2025 | BANKS featuring Doechii | Off with Her Head |
| "Delulu" | 2025 | BANKS | Off with Her Head |
| "Move" | 2025 | BANKS featuring Yseult | Off with Her Head |
| "Candy" | 2025 | BANKS | Off with Her Head |
| "Best For Me" | 2025 | Cynthia Erivo | I Forgive You |
| "This Is For" | 2025 | TWICE | This Is For |
| "Meeeeee" (Nayeon solo) | 2025 | TWICE | Ten: The Story Goes On |

== Filmography ==
=== Film ===
Film appearances by Tayla Parx
| Year | Title | Role | Notes |
|---|---|---|---|
| 2007 | Hairspray | Little Inez Stubbs | Critic's Choice Movie Awards for Best Acting Ensemble |
| 2007 | Beyond the Pretty Door | Angel Turner | |
| 2007 | Love... & Other 4 Letter Words | Young Stormy | |
| 2015 | Justice League: Gods and Monsters | Victor Stone (voice) | Direct-to-video |
| 2023 | Spinning Gold | Donna Summer | |
| 2025 | Juliet & Romeo | Rosaline | |

=== Television ===
Television appearances by Tayla Parx
| Year | Title | Role | Notes |
|---|---|---|---|
| 2006 | Gilmore Girls | Singing Kid #3 | Episode: "The Real Paul Anka" |
| 2006 | Everybody Hates Chris | Girl #2 | Episode: "Everybody Hates Rejection" |
| 2007 | Carpoolers | Aubrey's daughter | Episode: "The Toaster" |
| 2009–2010 | True Jackson, VP | Shelley | 3 episodes |
| 2010 | Bones | Jill MacIntosh | Episode: "The Twisted Bones in the Melted Truck" |
| 2012 | Victorious | Kara | Episode: "Tori & Jade's Playdate" |
| 2020 | The Sims Spark'd | Herself | Judge; 4 episodes |

=== Video games ===
Video game credits for Tayla Parx
| Year | Title | Role |
|---|---|---|
| 2014–2025 | The Sims 4 | Sim (voice) |
| 2018–2019 | The Walking Dead: The Final Season | Alvin "AJ" Jr. (voice) |
