= Don't Leave Me (BTS song) =

Single by BTS

from the album Face Yourself
- Language: Japanese
- Released: April 4, 2018
- Genre: J-pop; alternative hip hop; electronica
- Length: 3:47
- Label: Universal Japan; Def Jam
- Songwriters: "hitman" bang; Hiro; Pdogg; SUNNY BOY; UTA
- Producer: UTA

BTS singles chronology
| "Mic Drop" (2017) | "Don't Leave Me" (2018) | "Fake Love" (2018) |

BTS Japanese singles chronology
| "Mic Drop" / "DNA" / "Crystal Snow" (2017) | "Don't Leave Me" (2018) | "Fake Love" / "Airplane Pt. 2" (2018) |

"Don't Leave Me" is a song recorded by South Korean boy group BTS for their third Japanese studio album Face Yourself (2018). Released through Universal Music Japan, it is the third single from the album and also serves as the original soundtrack for the Japanese series Signal (2018).

== Composition ==
The single has been described as "a forward-thinking, genre-bending pop anthem of the highest quality", with samples of electronica and rap found throughout the song. It was produced by UTA, with "hitman" bang, Hiro, Pdogg, SUNNY BOY, & UTA writing lyrics for the piece.

The song is in the key of A♭ minor and it is 147 beats per minute running 3:47 minutes long.

== Reception ==
"Don't Leave Me" debuted on the Oricon Weekly Digital Singles chart in Japan at number 28, with 4,611 digital copies sold for the period dated April 2–8. In the United States, it topped the Billboard World Digital Song Sales chart issue dated April 14, 2018, with 9,000 copies sold, marking BTS' fifth-biggest sales debut for a song and sixth-biggest sales week overall. The band earned its seventh number-one entry on the ranking, further extending its record as the act with the most number-one's in the history of the chart.

== Charts ==
=== Weekly charts ===
| Chart (2018) | Peak position |
|---|---|
| Finland Digital Song Sales (Billboard) | 4 |
| France (SNEP) | 91 |
| Japan Digital Singles (Oricon) | 18 |
| Japan (Japan Hot 100) | 21 |
| South Korean International (Gaon) | 20 |
| US World Digital Song Sales (Billboard) | 1 |

=== Year-end charts ===
| Chart (2018) | Position |
|---|---|
| Japan (Japan Hot 100) | 96 |

== Certifications and sales ==
Sales and certifications for "Don't Leave Me"
| Region | Certification | Certified units/sales |
|---|---|---|
| Brazil (Pro-Música Brasil) | Gold | 20,000^{‡} |
| Japan | — | 4,611 |
| United States | — | 9,000 |
Streaming
| Japan (RIAJ) | Gold | 50,000,000^{†} |
^{‡} Sales+streaming figures based on certification alone.^{†} Streaming-only figures based on certification alone.
