= Chiiild =

Canadian experimental soul band

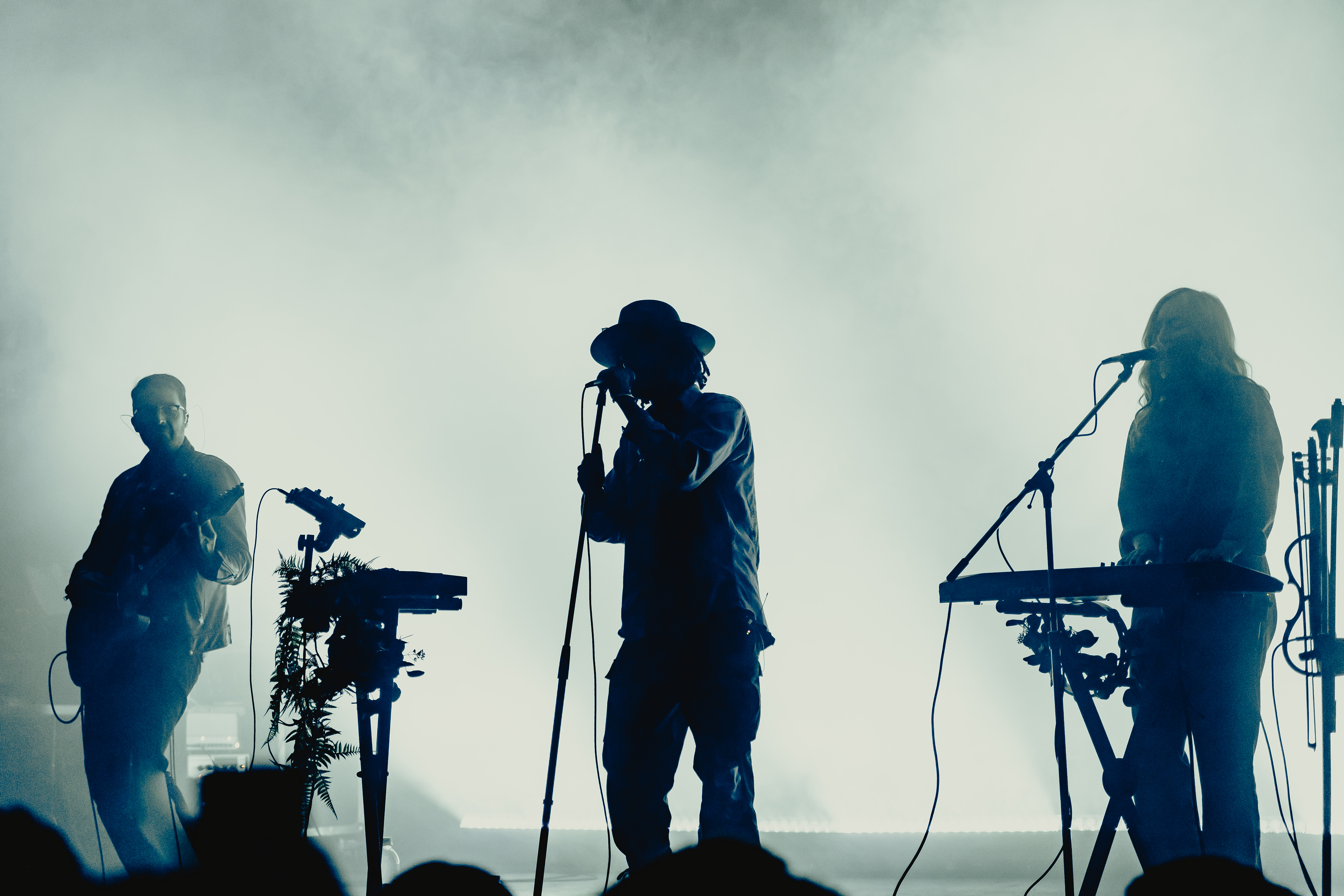
- Chiiild at the Phoenix Concert Theatre, Toronto on October 2, 2019

Background information
- Origin: Montréal, Quebec, Canada
- Genres: Synthetic soul; R&B; psychedelic soul; indie electronic
- Years active: 2017–present
- Labels: Avant Garden; 4th & Broadway; Def Jam Recordings
- Members: Yonatan "xSDTRK" Ayal
- Website: www.chiiild.com

Chiiild (pronounced "child") is a Canadian experimental soul band, fronted by Yonatan "xSDTRK" Ayal signed to Avant Garden Records and 4th & Broadway (Def Jam Recordings). The Montréal-based band formed in 2017 and released their debut EP, Synthetic Soul, in 2020.

== Musical style and influences ==
With a creative process rooted in collaborative experimentation, Chiiild's work has been universally described as "genre-bending." Various styles the band has drawn from include soul, R&B, psychedelia, jazz, indie, and pop. The band has dubbed this wide-ranging textural sound as “synthetic soul”.

The band has cited D'Angelo, Tame Impala, Pink Floyd, Marvin Gaye, The Notorious B.I.G., Brandy, Wu-Tang Clan, Fleetwood Mac and Moby as influences.

== Band members ==
The band's logo was designed in 2019 by Michael Brandonisio.

=== Current members ===
- Yonatan Ayal – producer, lead vocals, bass guitar, sampler (2017–present)
- Pierre-Luc Rioux – guitar, producer (2017–present)
- Janiyah Chappell - guitar, background vocalist (2018–present)

=== Supporting members ===
- Lauren "LYON" Malyon – violin, keyboards, tambourine, backing vocals (2017–present)
- Maxime Bellavance – drums (2017–present)

== Discography ==
=== Studio albums ===
List of studio albums, with release details
Title	Album details
Hope for Sale	Released: July 23, 2021; Label: Avant Garden / 4th & Broadway
Better Luck in the Next Life	Released: March 3, 2023; Label: Avant Garden / 4th & Broadway (Def Jam Recordings)

=== Extended plays ===
List of extended plays, with release details
Title	EP Details
Synthetic Soul	Released: February 28, 2020; Label: Avant Garden / 4th & Broadway; Formats: digital download, streaming

=== Singles ===
==== As lead artist ====
List of singles as lead artist, with release year and project name
Title	Year	Album / EP	Ref
"Count Me Out"	2019	Synthetic Soul	
"Back to Life" (featuring Shungudzo)	2019	Synthetic Soul	
"Darling"	2019	Synthetic Soul	
"Hands Off Me"	2020	Synthetic Soul	
"Sleepwalking"	2021	Hope for Sale	
"Awake" (featuring Mahalia)	2021	Hope for Sale	
"Gone"	2021	Hope for Sale	
"Eventually"	2021	Hope for Sale	
"Day 'n' Nite" (Kid Cudi cover)	2022		
"Bon Voyage"	2022	Better Luck in the Next Life	

==== As featured artist ====
Title	Year	Album / EP	Ref
"Bonafide" (Emotional Oranges featuring Chiiild)	2021	The Juicebox	
"Compassion" (Lucky Daye featuring Chiiild)	2022	Candydrip	

==== Promotional singles ====
List of promotional singles, with release year and project name
Title	Year	Album / EP	Ref
"Pirouette (Stripped)"	2020	Non-album single	

=== Guest appearances ===
List of non-single guest appearances, with other performing artist(s), release year and album name
Title	Year	Other artist	Album
"Careless"	2017	Daley	The Spectrum
"South Beach"	2018	Tayla Parx	Tayla Made

== Tours ==
=== Headline Tour ===
- Apocalyptic Optimistic Tour (2021)

=== Opening act ===
- The Boundless Tour (2022) (supporting Leon Bridges)
- A Very Emotional Tour (2019) (supporting Emotional Oranges)

== Awards and nominations ==
=== VEVO ===
Year	Work	Category
2022	Hope For Sale	DSCVR Artist To Watch 2022

=== JUNOS Awards ===
Year	Work	Category	Result
2022	Hope For Sale	Alternative Album of the Year	Nominated

=== Prism Prize ===
Year	Work	Category	Result
2022	Hope For Sale	Hi-Fidelity Award	Won

=== We The Beat Awards ===
Year	Work	Category	Result	Ref
2020	"Pirouette"	Song of the Year	Won	
