= DNA (BTS song) =

2017 single by BTS

- Regular and digital edition Japanese single cover

Single by BTS

from the EP Love Yourself: Her
- Language: Korean
- Released: September 18, 2017
- Studio: Big Hit Studios (Seoul)
- Genre: EDM; pop
- Length: 3:43
- Label: Big Hit; Universal Music Japan
- Songwriters: Pdogg; "Hitman" Bang; KASS; Supreme Boi; Suga; RM
- Producer: Pdogg

BTS singles chronology
"Not Today" (2017)	"DNA" (2017)	"Mic Drop" (2017)

BTS Japanese singles chronology
"Chi, Ase, Namida" (2017)	"Mic Drop" / "DNA" / "Crystal Snow" (2017)	"Don't Leave Me" (2018)

Music video
- "DNA" on YouTube

"DNA" is a song recorded in two languages (Korean and Japanese) by South Korean boy band BTS. The Korean version was released on September 18, 2017, as the lead single from the band's fifth extended play Love Yourself: Her (2017) by Big Hit Entertainment. The Japanese version of the song was released on December 6, 2017, by Universal Music Japan as a triple A-side single album that included "Mic Drop" and a new, original song "Crystal Snow", both also in Japanese. Both versions were written by "Hitman" Bang, Supreme Boi, KASS, Suga, RM, Pdogg, with the latter of the six solely handling production. A "Pedal 2 LA" remix of the track appears on the band's third compilation album, Love Yourself: Answer (2018). An EDM and pop song, the lyrics talk about fate and love at first sight.

The song received generally favourable reviews from music critics, who praised its production, sound, and the band's musical direction. It was also likened to the works of Selena Gomez, Shawn Mendes and Avicii. Commercially, the Korean version of "DNA" debuted at number two on the Gaon Digital Chart and number one on the Billboard K-pop Hot 100. It has since sold over 2.5 million digital copies in South Korea as of February 2019. The song peaked at number 67 on the US Billboard Hot 100 and at number 90 on the UK Singles Chart, becoming the band's first entry on both the charts. The Japanese version debuted and peaked at number one on the Oricon Singles Chart, becoming the 13th best-selling single of 2017 in Japan. The song was certified gold by the Recording Industry Association of America (RIAA) and double platinum by the Recording Industry Association of Japan (RIAJ). "DNA" received several accolades, including a nomination for Song of the Year at the 15th Korean Music Awards and the 19th Mnet Asian Music Awards.

The music video was directed by YongSeok Choi and premiered simultaneously with the release of the song. The video features the band performing complex choreography in various CGI-enhanced settings. Following the release of Love Yourself: Her, BTS promoted the song with televised live performances on several South Korean music programs, including M Countdown, Music Bank, and Inkigayo. The band's US television debut performance of "DNA" at the 2017 American Music Awards received positive reviews from critics. It was also included on the setlist of their Love Yourself World Tour (2018–19).

== Background and release ==
Following the success of their third studio album Wings (2016), and its reissue You Never Walk Alone (2017), BTS embarked on their "Love Yourself" thematic series. On August 24, 2017, the band announced the release of their fifth extended play, Love Yourself: Her which formed the first chapter of the extended three-part series. "DNA" was announced as the lead single from the EP. The song was written by "Hitman" Bang, Supreme Boi, Kass, Suga, RM, and its producer Pdogg. It was engineered by Pdogg, Wooyeong Jeong and KASS, while mixing was handled by James F. Reynolds at Schmuzik Studios. BTS recorded the song at Big Hit Studios in Seoul, South Korea.

"DNA" was released for digital download and streaming in various countries by Big Hit on September 18, 2017, as the lead single from Love Yourself: Her. A "Pedal 2 LA" remix version of the track was recorded and subsequently included on the band's third compilation album, Love Yourself: Answer (2018). The original version also appears on that album. A Japanese version of the song was digitally released for purchase on December 6, 2017, by Universal Music Japan as the band's eighth Japanese-language single album, together with the Japanese version of previously released Korean single "Mic Drop" and a new, original Japanese track "Crystal Snow". It was also released as a four-version CD single in Japan on the same day, with a regular edition and three different limited editions: A, B and C. All four editions contain "Mic Drop", "DNA" and "Crystal Snow" as a triple A-side. Individually, edition A includes a DVD with the music video for the Japanese version of "Mic Drop" and a dance version video of the song, edition B comes with a DVD that contains behind the scenes footage of the music video for "Mic Drop" and the making of album jacket photos, and edition C contains a 36-page photobook. The Japanese version was later included on the band's third Japanese-language studio album, Face Yourself (2018).

== Music and lyrics ==
"DNA"
A 22-second sample of the chorus of EDM and pop song "DNA", featuring an instrumental breakdown composed of rising-falling synth-line over acoustic guitar and Auto-Tuned vocals.

"DNA" has been characterised as an upbeat EDM and pop song. Some music journalists have noted elements of soft rock, hip hop and turbo-pop. In terms of musical notation, the song is composed in the key of C♯ minor, with a tempo of 130 beats per minute, and runs for 3:43. The modern electronic production consists of whistles, added bells, and acoustic guitar. It is driven by dynamic strings and a pulsating drum-line. Instrumentation for the song is provided by guitar, bass, keyboards, synthesizer, and drums. Band members RM, J-Hope and Jungkook provided backing vocals for the track, alongside KASS, Supreme Boi, Pdogg, and Lee Shinseong, while Tim Finn provided the bass vocals.

The song opens with a whistle hook glissando, which leads to an acoustic guitar loop. The beat introduced in the next section follows an accented four-on-the-floor rhythm pattern. The pre-chorus makes use of staccato guitar strums leading to an EDM-heavy drop. The chorus utilizes an instrumental breakdown composed of rising-falling synth-line over acoustic guitar, accompanied by heavy Auto-Tuned vocals. The titular phrase is chanted during the chorus. The song features "melodic" verses, "softer" vocal harmonies and "aggressive" raps from the band.

According to RM, "DNA" revolves around "the expression of a young, passionate love" that is "very different" from the band's previous releases. Lyrically, the song explores the theme of fate and love at first sight, through lines like: "I knew you from first sight/ As if we have been calling for each other/ The DNA in my veins tells me/ You're the one I’ve been searching for. (Note: Original Hangul lyrics: 첫눈에 널 알아보게 됐어 서롤 불러왔던 것처럼 내 혈관 속 DNA가 말해줘 내가 찾아 헤매던 너라는 걸) It also delves into themes of science and religion comparing love to a mathematical formula and divine providence; "Our meeting is a mathematical formula/ Religious commandments, law of the universe." (Note: Original Hangul lyrics: 우리 만남은 수학의 공식 종교의 율법 우주의 섭리) The lyrics further use cosmic and corporeal imagery to display the theme of universal love such as "From the day the universe was birthed/ Over the infinite centuries/ In our past lives and probably in our next too/ We are together eternally." (Note: Original Hangul lyrics: 우주가 생긴 그 날부터 계속 무한의 세기를 넘어서 계속 우린 전생에도 아마 다음 생에도 영원히 함께니까)

== Critical reception ==
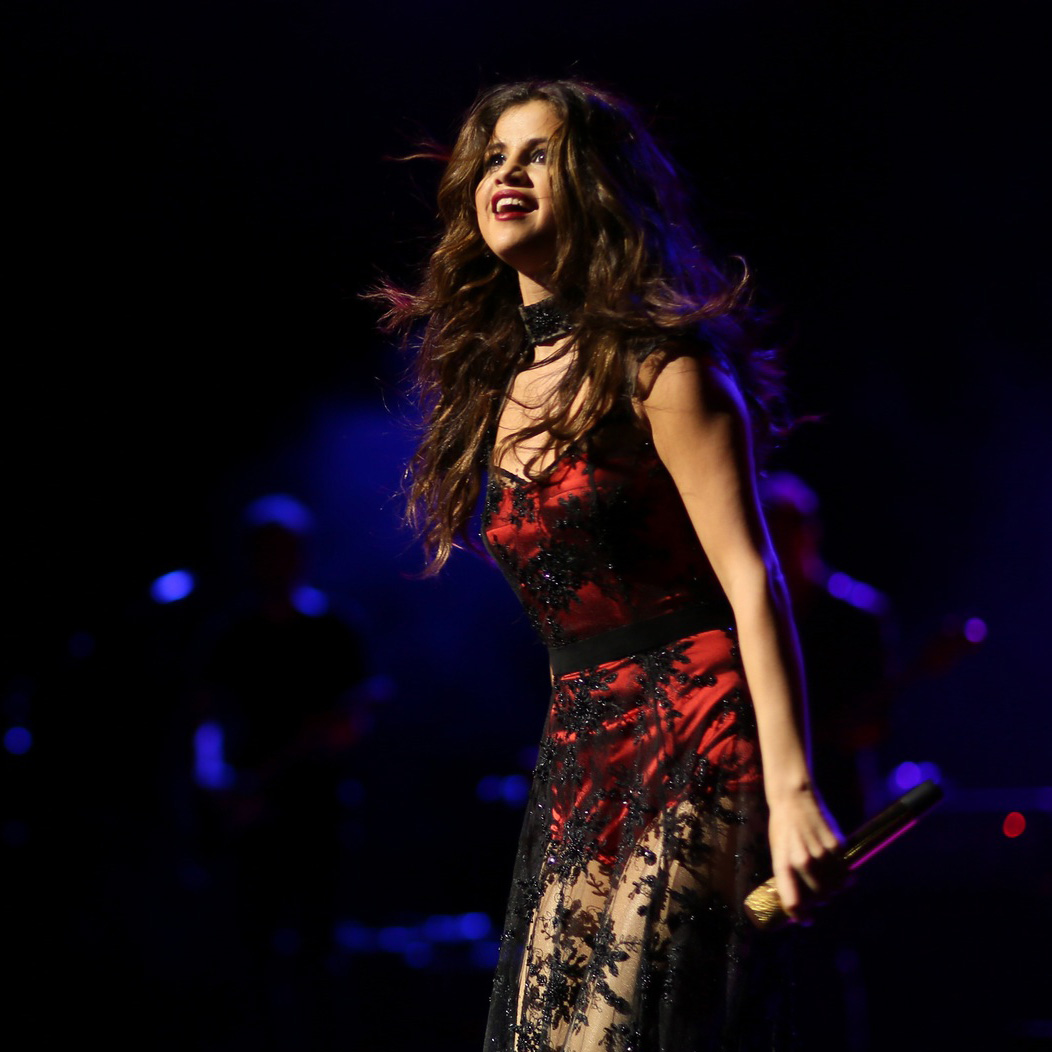
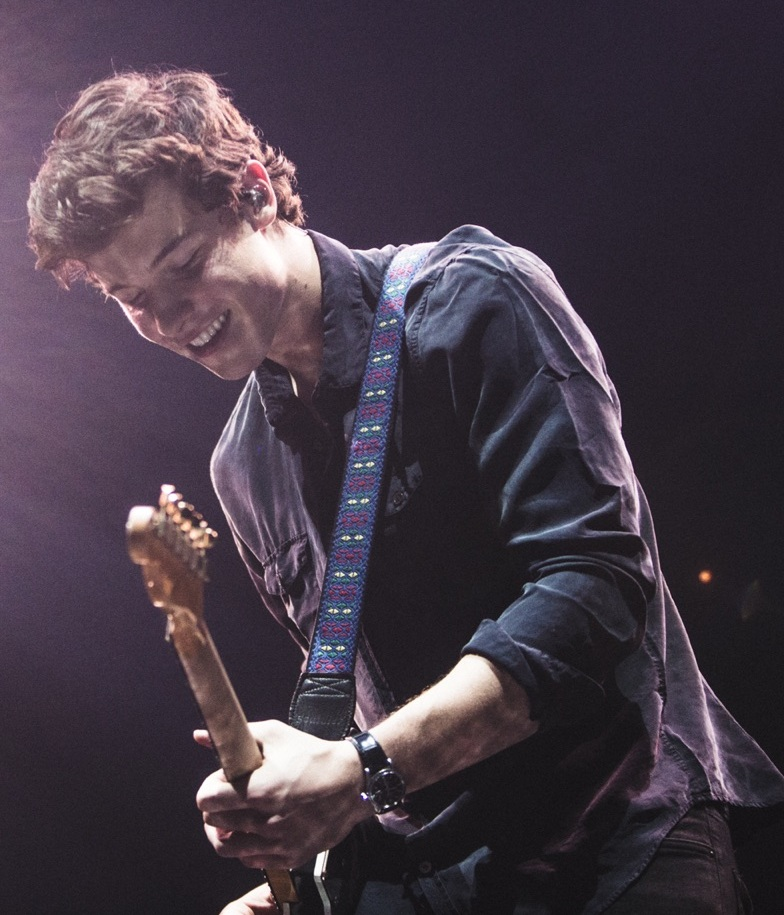
Critics noted similarities in the song's production and styles to the works of Selena Gomez (left) and Shawn Mendes (right).

"DNA" received generally favourable reviews from music critics. Writing for Idolator, Jacques Peterson regarded the song as "fizzy, candy-coated EDM" and likened the acoustic guitars in the production to that of Swedish DJ Avicii. Peterson also wrote another article for the same publication where he praised the "musical bells and whistles" in the song's production which "completely transcends racial and language barriers for a truly global sound." Do-heon Kim from IZM praised the song's "detailed" production, labelling the track as a "moment of peak." Reviewing for Vulture, Dee Lockett stated that the song evolved the band's sound and was "unlike so many of the songs that made them an international phenomenon," calling it one of the better singles of the year." Billboard's Tamar Herman appreciated the balance of "powerful EDM elements and softer harmonies" and likened the whistling to Selena Gomez's song, "Kill Em with Kindness" (2016). Caitlin Kelley, also of Billboard, cited the track as "one of those rare instances when a K-pop act's transmutation of their American influences was reflected back at the U.S. in full Technicolor."

In The Korea Herald, Dam-young Hong felt that the track displayed a new musical direction for the band as opposed to their signature hip-hop styles and wrote that the song "is a hint of the group's resolution that it will continue trying different musical approaches." Hyun-su Yim, also of The Korea Herald, acclaimed the song for its "whistled hook", "feather-light guitar riffs" and "generous use of the pop-drop." Elias Leight of Rolling Stone enjoyed the track, describing it as "a jauntily strummed pop tune." Reviewing for The New York Times, Jon Caramanica favoured the "shuddering club-music drops" in the production and also likened the guitar intro to that of Shawn Mendes. In another review for the same publication, Caramanica cited the song as a "peak hypercolor pop." Taylor Glasby from Clash magazine praised the track, calling it an "idiosyncratic earworm," which "struck a chord." Tamara Fuentes of Seventeen liked the song and deemed it as "fun and infectious." Writing for The Malaysia Star, Chester Chin shared a similar view, describing the track as a "livewire EDM banger." In a mixed review for Spin, Monique Melendez regarded the song as an "outlier" as compared to the band's previous songs but panned the use of heavy Auto-Tune.

== Accolades ==
"DNA" became the first-place winner on various South Korean weekly music programs. The song won a total of 10 music show awards including a "triple crown" (three consecutive wins) on both Music Bank and Inkigayo. The song also achieved five consecutive Melon Weekly Popularity Awards due to its substantial success on digital platforms. Billboard included "DNA" in their lists of greatest boy band songs of all time and 100 best songs of 2017. The song received several accolades, most notably Best Music Video at the 2017 Melon Music Awards and a nomination for Song of the Year at both the 15th Korean Music Awards and the 19th Mnet Asian Music Awards. In 2023, "DNA" became one of the first K-pop songs (along with Blackpink's "Whistle") to be inducted into Korea World Music Culture's Hall of Fame.

Awards and nominations for "DNA"
Award-giving body	Year	Category	Result	Ref.
Melon Music Awards	2017	Best Dance	Nominated	
Melon Music Awards	2017	Best Music Video	Won	
Mnet Asian Music Awards	2017	Mwave Global Fans' Choice	Nominated	
Mnet Asian Music Awards	2017	Best Dance Performance – Male Group	Nominated	
Mnet Asian Music Awards	2017	Qoo10 Song of the Year	Nominated	
Korean Music Awards	2018	Song of the Year	Nominated	
Korean Music Awards	2018	Best Pop Song	Nominated	
Radio Disney Music Awards	2018	Best Song That Makes You Smile	Won	
Annual Soompi Awards	2018	Song of the Year	Won	
Annual Soompi Awards	2018	Fuse Video of the Year	Won	
Annual Soompi Awards	2018	Best Choreography	Won	
Korea World Music Culture Hall of Fame	2023	Hall of Fame	Inducted	

Music program awards (10 total)
Program	Date	Ref.
The Show	September 26, 2017	
Show Champion	September 27, 2017	
M Countdown	September 28, 2017	
M Countdown	October 5, 2017	
Music Bank	September 29, 2017	
Music Bank	October 6, 2017	
Music Bank	October 13, 2017	
Inkigayo	October 1, 2017	
Inkigayo	October 8, 2017	
Inkigayo	October 15, 2017	

== Commercial performance ==
"DNA" debuted at number two on South Korean's Gaon Digital Chart for the chart issue dated September 17–23, 2017, and sold 224,178 digital units in its first week of release. The song remained in the top five for four consecutive weeks before falling out of the top ten for the week of October 15, 2017. "DNA" was the sixth best-performing song of the September 2017 issue of the Gaon Monthly Digital Chart based on digital sales, streaming, and background music (instrumental track) downloads. It eventually became the 56th and 22nd best-performing song of 2017 and 2018 respectively in South Korea. As of February 2019, "DNA" has sold over 2.5 million digital units in the country. Additionally, the song peaked at number one on the Billboard K-pop Hot 100 and at number five on the Billboard Japan Hot 100.

"DNA" debuted at number 85 on the US Billboard Hot 100 for the chart issue dated September 21, 2017, becoming BTS' first entry on the chart. The following week, it climbed to and peaked at number 67. In so doing, it became the highest-charting song by a Korean band, surpassing Wonder Girls' record at number 76. The single debuted at number one on the US World Digital Songs chart issue dated October 10, 2017, becoming the band's fourth number one on the chart. As of September 2019, the track has sold nearly 100,000 downloads in the US. On February 9, 2018, it was certified gold by the Recording Industry Association of America (RIAA), for track equivalent sales of 500,000 units." "DNA" gave BTS their first entry on the UK Singles Chart at number 90. The song also charted at number 47 on the Canadian Hot 100 and appeared at number 99 on Australia's ARIA Charts. It was certified gold by the Australian Recording Industry Association (ARIA) for track-equivalent sales of 35,000 units.

Following the release of the song as a single album in Japan, "Mic Drop / DNA / Crystal Snow" topped the Oricon Daily Singles Chart on its first day of release, selling 269,861 copies. The single remained at number one on the daily chart for the next six days, selling 365,096 physical copies in its first week. With this, the band became the first foreign artist to surpass 300,000 copies in a week. "Mic Drop / DNA / Crystal Snow" peaked at number one on the Oricon Weekly Singles Chart for the chart issue dated December 4–10, 2017. For the year end chart, it was the 13th best-selling single of 2017 in the country. On January 15, 2018, the single album received Double Platinum certification from the Recording Industry Association of Japan (RIAJ), denoting shipments of 500,000 copies, making BTS the only foreign artist to achieve this for a single released in 2017. In April 2020, "DNA" received a Silver streaming certification from the RIAJ for 30 million digital streams.

== Music video ==
=== Background ===
The music video for "DNA" premiered on Big Hit's YouTube channel at 18:00 KST (01:00 PST) on September 18, 2017; it was preceded by two teasers released on the same platform on September 14 and 15. The video was directed by YongSeok Choi of Lumpens, with WonJu Lee serving as the assistant director. It was choreographed by Christopher Martin with Keone and Mari Madrid. HyunWoo Nam of GDW was credited as the director of photography, while HyunSuk Song served as the gaffer and Park Jinsil as the art director. As opposed to the band's other music videos, the visual is without an extensive plot and depicts the band performing choreography on CGI sets.

=== Synopsis ===
BTS performing the double helix of DNA molecule in the music video

The music video opens with close-up shots of Jungkook whistling against a backdrop of mathematical formulas and molecular structures. The video then switches to show him joining the rest of the band as the whistling continues and they start dancing, being backed by gentle guitar strumming. In it, they are seen in bubblegum-shade hair with technicolors exploding in the background. The clip alternates between close-ups of each member staring directly into the camera and group shots of the band performing "complex, floor-sweeping" choreography in multiple vibrant coloured CGI-enhanced sets. In some of these scenes, the members are dressed in casual basketball jerseys and jumpers of bold primary colors, while in others, they wear retro-themed outfits. At one point, they roam around a glowing set illuminated with pastel-hued lights.

The video features helix structures, mathematical and molecular formulas as imagery. It also keeps up with the theme of science and religion depicting solar systems, stars and celestial symbolism. In one scene, the band is surrounded by stars and they start dancing with a giant moon in the background. During the final chorus, the visual depicts images of actual DNA as BTS hold hands and impersonate the chemical structure of the molecule through choreography. The clip ends with the band performing a "dramatic finale" as J-Hope sings "la la la."

=== Reception ===
In her review for Vogue, Monica Kim praised the video's flamboyant fashion styles and "fluid dancing." Arim Kim from The Korea Herald connected the music video with the song's lyrics writing that it exudes "a vibrant and bombastic energy" depicting love "in full blossom." Alex Rees of Cosmopolitan enjoyed the clip, calling it a "trippy fun" video and also deemed the choreography as "killer." The music video achieved over 22 million views in 24 hours, becoming the most viewed video in 24 hours by a K-pop band and eleventh most viewed video at the time of release. Within 24 days, it garnered over 100 million views, becoming the fastest K-pop video to do so. It was the most watched Korean video of 2017 on YouTube. In January 2019, it became the first music video by a K-pop group to reach 600 million views on the platform. On June 1, 2020, the video surpassed one billion views, becoming BTS' first music video to do so. It also became the first music video by a K-pop boy band to attain the milestone, making BTS the third Korean act to achieve this. As of September 2025, the video has garnered over 1.6 billion views on YouTube.

== Live performances and other usage ==
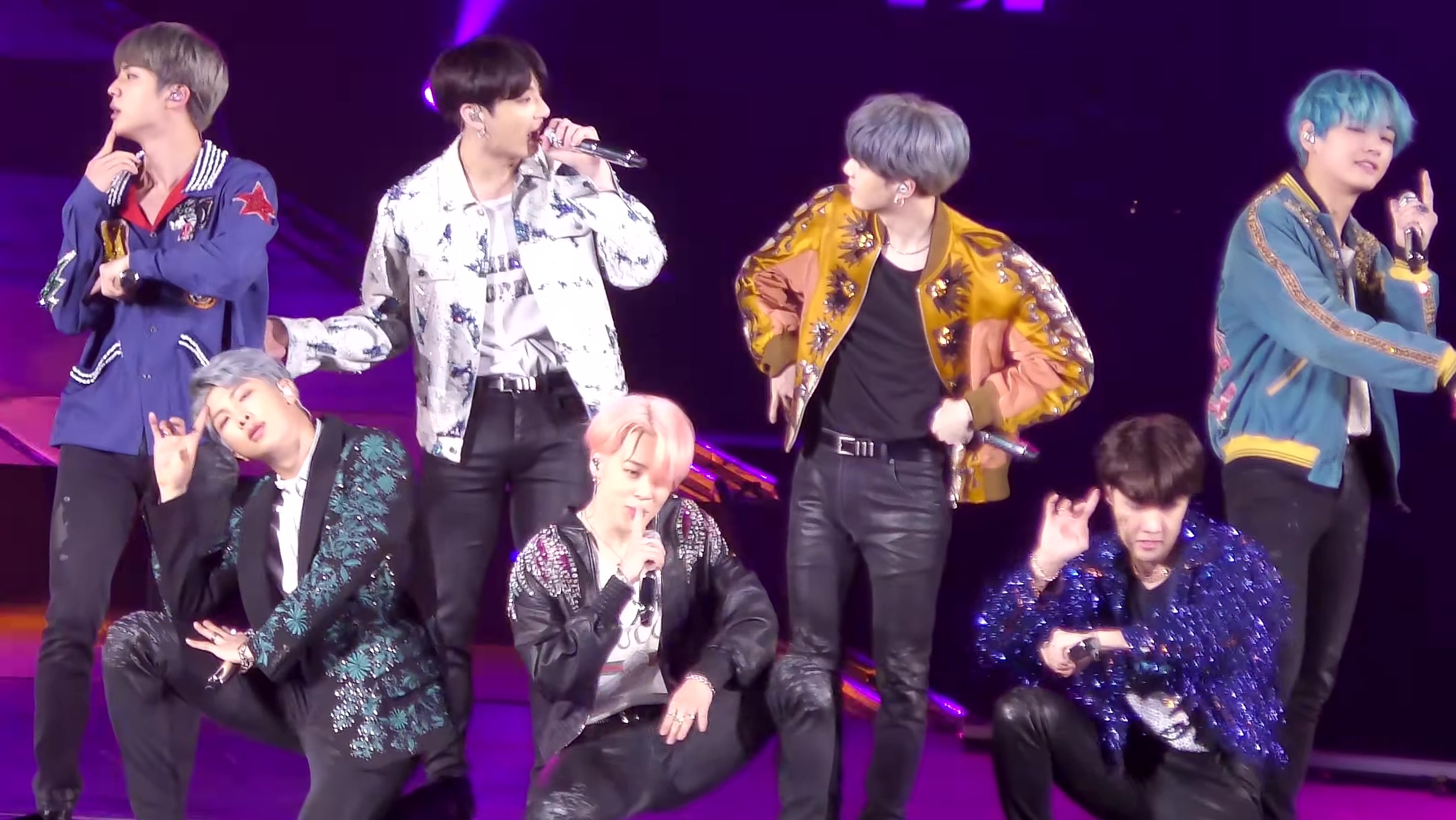
BTS performing "DNA" during the Love Yourself World Tour on January 13, 2019, at Nagoya Dome, Japan

Following the release of Love Yourself: Her, BTS appeared on several Korean music programs, including Mnet's M! Countdown, KBS's Music Bank, SBS's Inkigayo and MBC Music's Show Champion to promote "DNA" and the album. During their first live performance on Music Bank, the band wore liquid silk shirts and simple trainers. They performed the song at the SBS Gayo Daejeon music festival on December 25, 2018.

BTS performed "DNA" at the 2017 American Music Awards on November 19, 2017, marking their US television debut. The band wore "jeans-and-bomber combos" for their dynamic rendition of the song. The performance was acclaimed in the media. Jennifer Drysdale of Entertainment Tonight labelled the performance as "energetic" and "mind-blowing" with "some of the most intricate choreography of any pop boy band ever." Mary Wang of Vogue praised the "characteristically tight choreography" and "coordinating" on-stage fashion style of the band. Maura Johnston of Rolling Stone chose the performance as one of the best moments of the awards show writing, "BTS’ synchronized moves and the lovelorn lyrics of 'DNA' make them feel like a bit of a throwback to the TRL era, but their forward-thinking music, which borrows from Kpop's meticulously detailed sonics and hip-hop's spaced-out beats, places them ahead of the late-2010s’ pop pack." Melendez of Spin lauded the "complex choreography", "rapid fire footwork" and "an on-the-nose double helix formation" of the band. On November 30, 2017, they performed the song again on The Late Late Show with James Corden, becoming the first Korean act to do so. Additionally, BTS gave a pre-recorded performance of the track on Dick Clark's New Year's Rockin' Eve in December 2017. "DNA" was included on the setlist of BTS' Love Yourself World Tour (2018–19). The song was played during the opening ceremony of the 2018 Winter Olympics.

== Track listings ==
Digital download / streaming – Korean version
No.	Title	Length
1.	"DNA"	3:43

Digital download / streaming – Pedal 2 LA Remix
No.	Title	Length
1.	"DNA" (LA Pedal Remix)	3:43

Digital download / Regular CD Edition – Japanese version
No.	Title	Length
1.	"Mic Drop"	3:58
2.	"DNA"	3:44
3.	"Crystal Snow"	5:22
Total length:		13:04

Limited Edition A (CD + DVD) – Japanese version
No.	Title	Length
1.	"Mic Drop"	3:58
2.	"DNA"	3:44
3.	"Crystal Snow"	5:22
4.	"Mic Drop" (music video)
5.	"Mic Drop" (music video - dance version)

Limited Edition B (CD + DVD) – Japanese version
No.	Title	Length
1.	"Mic Drop"	3:58
2.	"DNA"	3:44
3.	"Crystal Snow"	5:22
4.	"Mic Drop" (making of music video)
5.	"Mic Drop" (making of jacket photos)

Limited Edition C (CD + Booklet) – Japanese version
No.	Title	Length
1.	"Mic Drop"	3:58
2.	"DNA"	3:44
3.	"Crystal Snow"	5:22

== Credits and personnel ==
=== Korean / Japanese version ===
Credits are adapted from the CD liner notes of Love Yourself: Her.

- BTS – primary vocals
- Pdogg – production, keyboard, synthesizer, gang vocals, rap arrangement, record engineering
- "Hitman" Bang – songwriting
- KASS – songwriting, record engineering, gang vocals
- Supreme Boi – songwriting, record engineering, gang vocals, chorus
- Suga – songwriting
- RM – songwriting, gang vocals
- J-Hope – gang vocals
- Jungkook – chorus
- Lee Shinseong – chorus
- Jeong Jaepil – guitar
- Lee Jooyeong – bass
- Jeong Wooyeong – record engineering
- James F. Reynolds – mix engineering
- Tim Finn – drums, bass vocals

=== Pedal 2 LA Remix ===
Credits are adapted from the CD liner notes of Love Yourself: Answer.

- BTS – primary vocals
- Pdogg – production, gang vocals, vocal and rap arrangement, record engineering
- "Hitman" Bang – production
- KASS – production, chorus, gang vocals, record engineering
- Supreme Boi – production, chorus, gang vocals, record engineering
- Suga – production
- RM – production, gang vocals
- Slow Rabbit – production, keyboard, synthesizer
- Jungkook – chorus
- Lee Shinseong – chorus
- Lee Taewook – guitar
- Lee Jooyeong – bass
- J-Hope – gang vocals
- Jeong Wooyeong – record engineering
- Park Jinse – mix engineering

== Charts ==
=== Weekly charts ===
Weekly chart performance
Chart (2017)	Peak position
Australia (ARIA)	99
Canada (Canadian Hot 100)	47
France (SNEP)	76
Finland Download (Latauslista)	10
Japan (Japan Hot 100)	5
Japan (Oricon)	1 (Note: Based on physical sales of single album Mic Drop / DNA / Crystal Snow)
Malaysia (RIM)	6
New Zealand Heatseeker (RMNZ)	2
Philippines (Philippine Hot 100)	8
Philippines (K-Pop Top 5)	1
Scottish Singles Sales (Official Charts)	63
Slovakia Singles Digital (ČNS IFPI)	92
South Korea (Gaon)	2
South Korea (Hot 100)	1
Sweden Heatseeker (Sverigetopplistan)	2
UK Indie (Official Charts)	12
UK Singles (Official Charts)	90
Uruguay (Monitor Latino)	12
US Billboard Hot 100	67
US World Digital Songs (Billboard)	1

=== Monthly charts ===
Monthly chart performance
Chart (2017)	Position
South Korea (Gaon Digital Chart)	6

=== Yearly charts ===
Year-end chart performance
Chart (2017)	Position
Japan (Oricon)	13
South Korea (Gaon Digital Chart)	56

Year-end chart performance
Chart (2018)	Position
Japan (Japan Hot 100)	24
South Korea (Gaon Digital Chart)	22

Year-end chart performance
Chart (2019)	Position
South Korea (Gaon Digital Chart)	133

== Certifications and sales ==
Certifications and sales
Region	Certification	Certified units/sales
Australia (ARIA)	Gold	35,000^{‡}
France (SNEP)	Gold	100,000^{‡}
Japan (RIAJ) DNA Japanese version	2× Platinum	500,000^{^}
New Zealand (RMNZ)	Platinum	30,000^{‡}
South Korea	—	2,500,000
United Kingdom (BPI)	Silver	200,000^{‡}
United States (RIAA)	Platinum	1,000,000^{‡}
Streaming
Japan (RIAJ)	2× Platinum	200,000,000^{†}
Japan (RIAJ) DNA Japanese version	Silver	30,000,000^{†}
^{^} Shipments figures based on certification alone.^{‡} Sales+streaming figures based on certification alone.^{†} Streaming-only figures based on certification alone.

== Release history ==
Release dates and formats
Country	Date	Format(s)	Version	Label(s)	Ref.
Various	September 18, 2017	Digital download; streaming	Korean	Big Hit Entertainment	
Various	August 24, 2018	Digital download; streaming	Remix	Big Hit Entertainment	
Japan	December 6, 2017	CD single	Japanese	Universal Music Japan	
Japan	December 6, 2017	CD + DVD	Japanese	Universal Music Japan	
Japan	December 6, 2017	CD + Booklet	Japanese	Universal Music Japan	
Various	December 6, 2017	Digital download; streaming	Japanese	Universal Music Japan	

== See also ==
- List of K-pop Hot 100 number ones
- List of Oricon number-one singles of 2017
