= Mic Drop (song) =

2017 song by BTS

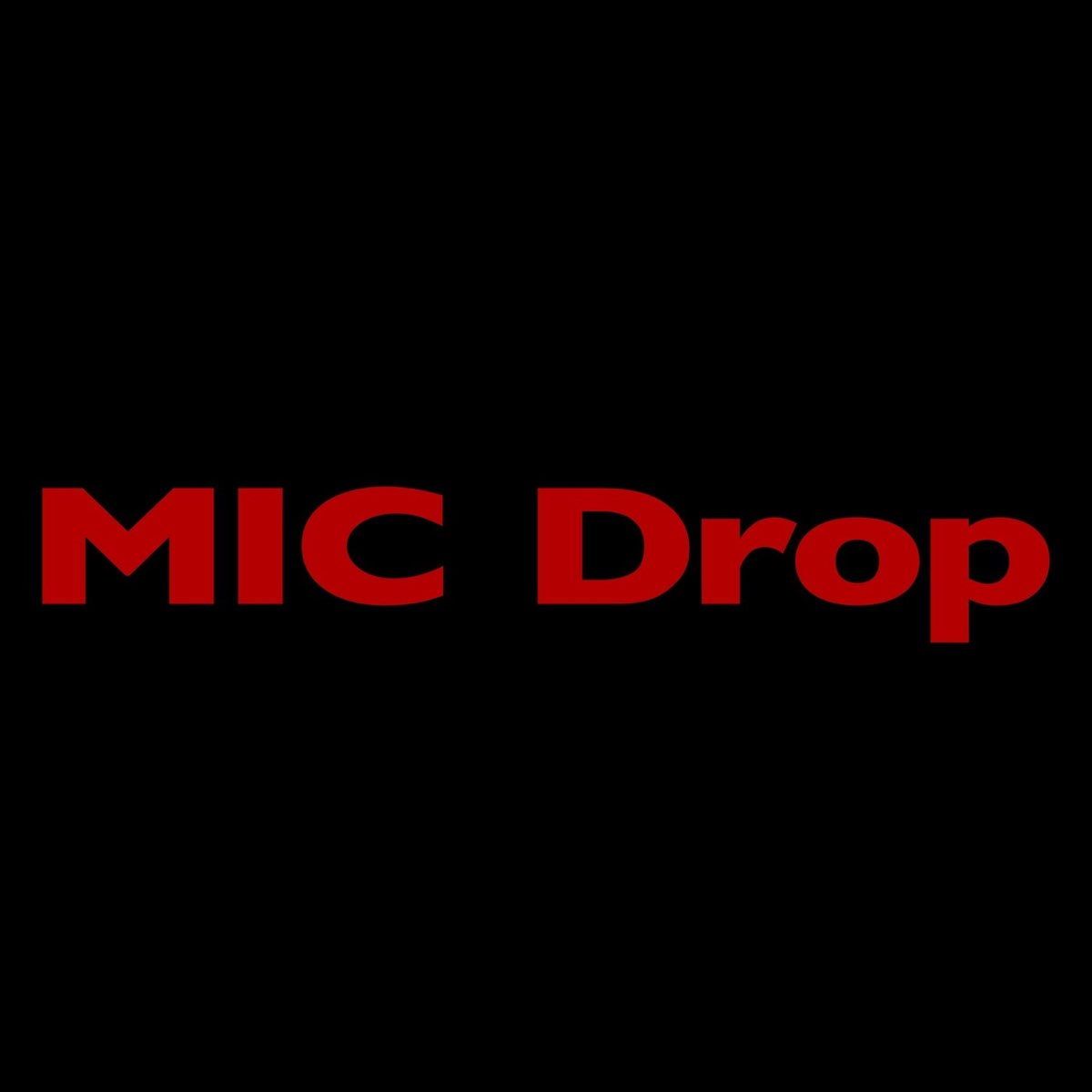
- Cover for Steve Aoki remix featuring Desiigner

Single by BTS featuring Desiigner

from the EP Love Yourself: Her
- Released: November 24, 2017
- Genre: Hip hop; EDM; trap
- Length: 3:58
- Label: Big Hit; Def Jam; Virgin
- Songwriters: RM; Supreme Boi; "Hitman" Bang; J-Hope; Pdogg; Steve Aoki; Desiigner; Tayla Parx; Flowsik; Shae Jacobs
- Producers: Pdogg (Korean and Japanese); Steve Aoki (Remix)

BTS singles chronology
"DNA" (2017)	"Mic Drop" (2017)	"Don't Leave Me" (2018)

Alternative cover
- Japanese single cover

BTS Japanese singles chronology
"Chi, Ase, Namida" (2017)	"Mic Drop" / "DNA" / "Crystal Snow" (2017)	"Don't Leave Me" (2018)

Music videos
- "Mic Drop" (Steve Aoki remix) on YouTube
- "Mic Drop" (Japanese version) on YouTube

"Mic Drop" (stylized as "MIC Drop") is a song recorded in two languages (Korean and Japanese) by South Korean boy band BTS. The Korean version was originally included as a B-side track on the band's fifth extended play, Love Yourself: Her (2017), and later remixed by American producer and DJ Steve Aoki. The remix was released as the second single from the EP on November 24, 2017, by Big Hit Entertainment and features a guest appearance by American rapper Desiigner. It was serviced to US contemporary hit radio on December 5, 2017, as a single in that country. The Japanese-language version of "Mic Drop" was released on December 6, 2017, by Def Jam Recordings and Virgin Music as a triple A-side single album that included "DNA" and a new, original song "Crystal Snow", both also in Japanese. Both the Korean and Japanese versions of the song were written by Supreme Boi, "Hitman" Bang, J-Hope, RM, and Pdogg, with the latter of the five solely handling production. The remix version was also written by the same songwriters, with additional songwriting by Aoki, Desiigner, Tayla Parx, Flowsik, and Shae Jacobs. It was produced by Aoki, with Pdogg providing additional production. A hip hop song, the lyrics celebrate BTS' numerous achievements.

The song received generally favourable reviews from music critics, who praised its beat, sound, and musical styles, and picked it as a standout track on Love Yourself: Her. Commercially, the remix version of "Mic Drop" debuted at number 28 on the US Billboard Hot 100, becoming the band's first track to reach the top 40 on the chart. The song appeared at number 37 on the Canadian Hot 100 and number 46 on the UK Singles Chart, in addition to reaching moderate peaks in several other territories. The Japanese version debuted at number one on both the Oricon Singles Chart and the Billboard Japan Hot 100. It was the 13th best-selling single of 2017 in Japan. It was certified platinum by the Recording Industry Association of America (RIAA) and double platinum by the Recording Industry Association of Japan (RIAJ).

Two music videos were filmed for "Mic Drop", one for the Korean remix version and one for the Japanese version. Woogie Kim directed the music video for the Korean version which premiered on Big Hit's YouTube channel at the same time as the song's release. The video for the Japanese version was uploaded to Universal Music Japan's YouTube channel on December 5, 2017. Both videos depict the band performing powerful choreography in various settings. Following the release of Love Yourself: Her, BTS appeared on several South Korean music programs including M! Countdown, Music Bank, and Inkigayo. They promoted the remix version of the song with performances on The Ellen DeGeneres Show, Jimmy Kimmel Live!, and Saturday Night Live, amongst others. It was also included on the setlist for the band's Love Yourself World Tour (2018–19).

== Background and release ==
South Korean boy band BTS had achieved consecutive entries on Billboard charts with The Most Beautiful Moment in Life, Pt. 2 (2015), The Most Beautiful Moment in Life: Young Forever (2016), and Wings (2016). The band further garnered major attention in the United States after winning the Top Social Artist award at the 2017 Billboard Music Awards, becoming the first K-pop group ever to be nominated for and win a Billboard Music Award. They released their fifth extended play Love Yourself: Her on September 18, 2017, to commercial success. The EP debuted and peaked at number seven on the US Billboard 200, becoming the first Korean album to enter the top 10 on the chart. Originally included as a B-side track on Love Yourself: Her, a remix of "Mic Drop" by electro house DJ Steve Aoki featuring American rapper Desiigner, was announced for release as a single on November 7, 2017. In an interview with Billboard magazine, Desiigner stated that he had met the band at the Billboard Music Awards earlier that year and became involved in the collaboration.

"Mic Drop" was released for digital download and streaming in various countries by Big Hit Entertainment on November 24, 2017, as the second single from Love Yourself: Her. Big Hit and RED Music later serviced the song to contemporary hit radio in the US on December 5, 2017. An extended version of the remix appears on the band's third compilation album Love Yourself: Answer (2018). A Japanese version of the song was digitally released for purchase on December 6, 2017, by Universal Music Japan as the band's eighth Japanese-language single album, together with the Japanese version of previously released Korean single "DNA" and a new, original Japanese track "Crystal Snow". It was also released as a four-version CD single in Japan on the same day, with a regular edition and three different limited editions: A, B and C. All four editions contain "Mic Drop", "DNA" and "Crystal Snow" as a triple A-side. Individually, edition A includes a DVD with the music video for the Japanese version of "Mic Drop" and a dance version video of the song, edition B comes with a DVD that contains behind the scenes footage of the music video for "Mic Drop" and the making of album jacket photos, and edition C contains a 36-page photobook. The Japanese version was later included on the band's third Japanese-language studio album Face Yourself (2018).

== Music and lyrics ==
"Mic Drop" (Steve Aoki remix)
A 23-second sample of the chorus of the remix version of "Mic Drop", an EDM and trap song over hip hop melody.

Musically, the album version of "Mic Drop" has been described as a groovy hip hop number backed by heavy bass and sampled gunshots. The remix version introduces EDM synths and trap-infused beats over the original hip hop melody. In terms of musical notation, the original version was composed in the key of F♯ major, while the remix was composed in A♯ minor. Both versions have a tempo of 170 beats per minute and last for 3:58. Two versions of the remix were released: the studio version released on digital streaming platforms featured Desiigner, while the version accompanying the music video replaced the rapper's intro with Korean verses from the original album version. Both the original Korean and Japanese versions were written by Pdogg, Supreme Boi, "Hitman" Bang, and band members RM and J-Hope, with production handled solely by Pdogg. The remixed version was also created by the same songwriters, with additional writing by Aoki, Desiigner, Tayla Parx, Flowsik, and Shae Jacobs. The latter was produced by Aoki, with additional production from Pdogg who also served as one of the recording engineers of the track. Band member Jungkook provided backing vocals for the song, alongside Supreme Boi, Docskim, Hiss Noise and Pdogg. It was mixed by Jaycen Joshua with assistance from David Nakaj and Ben Milchev at the Larrabee Sound Studios in North Hollywood, Los Angeles, while mastering was handled by Randy Merrill at Sterling Sound in New York City.

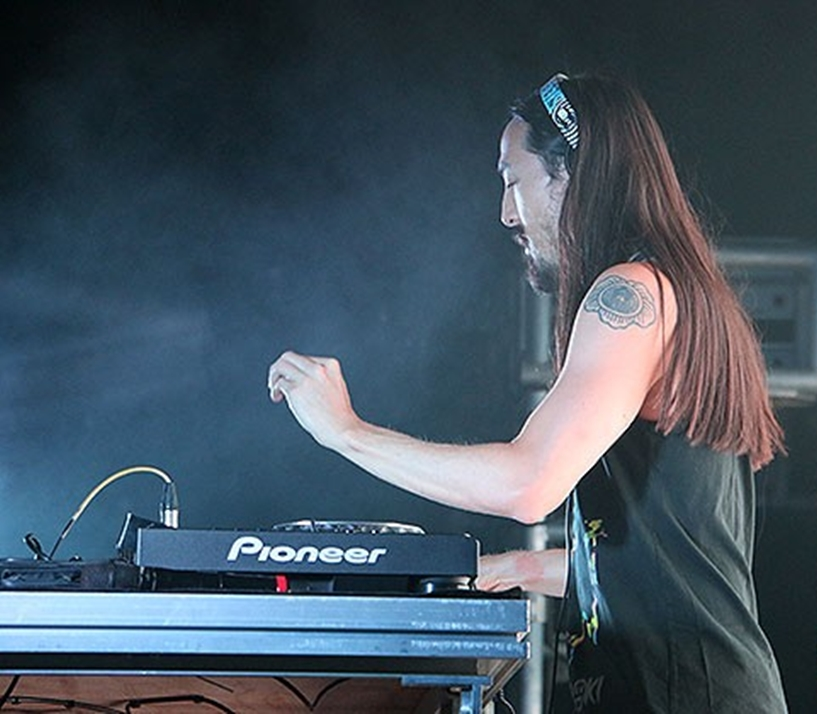
American electro house musician Steve Aoki (pictured) produced the remix of "Mic Drop".

The song incorporates a dark percussion line and Lil Wayne-esque cadences in its composition. As opposed to Aoki's signature build-and-drop house music style, it makes use of an uptempo "cluttered" production, which loops its starting rhythm with trap and a pulsating synth-line. Instrumentation is provided by keyboards, synthesizer, and guitar. The song is further driven by drumbeats and features repetitive chanting from the band. The opening verse features Desiigner's "fast-talking" followed by heavy Auto-Tuned vocals and "super-aggressive" English verses from the band.

According to RM, "Mic Drop" was inspired by former US president Barack Obama's mic drop at his last White House Correspondents' Dinner in 2016. Speaking about the song in an interview, Desiigner said: "What ["Mic Drop"] means to me is definitely—like when you really amazingly, tremendously kill the beat. And you just drop the mic after that. You just know that you did your thing on that." In the song's lyrics, BTS celebrate their global popularity, narrating their hard work and numerous achievements through lines like: "Another trophy, my hands carry 'em / Too many that I can't even count 'em (turn it up now) / Mic drop, mic drop / Be careful of your feet, be careful of what you say." (Note: The quoted lyrics are from the remix version of the song.)

== Critical reception ==
Upon release, "Mic Drop" was met with generally favourable reviews from music critics. Writing for The Malaysia Star, Chester Chin praised the song as "a brilliant display of artistry," calling it "an explosive and menacing track with some dirty bass to boot." Jeff Benjamin from Fuse lauded the cohesiveness of the song's diverse musical styles, writing that the Steve Aoki remix "wasn't just brilliant for its blending of different genres and styles, but how all those elements enhance one another." He further stated, "Desiigner's ridiculously awesome flow fits perfectly alongside BTS' braggadocio, with it all backed by a mainstream-accessible Aoki beat." Reviewing for Clash, Taylor Glasby viewed the track as a "scorching, hater-baiting" song and deemed it as the "sonic outlier" of Love Yourself: Her. Rhian Daly of NME regarded the song as "a swag-filled rap-led track full of their very own mic drop moments." In his review for The Korea Herald, Dam-young Hong cited the track as "an artwork, offering listeners a flash of footprints BTS have left in the K-pop scene over the past few months." Music critic Sunmi Ahn also wrote an article for the same publication where she praised the song's production and lyrical content writing, "With a killer beat and smart yet frank lyrics, it's a song that describes how BTS got to the top." IZM's Do-heon Kim favoured the aggressive guitar riff in the production, likening it to that of '90s South Korean music group Seo Taiji and Boys. Mike Nied of Idolator deemed the song "one of the hardest hitting on an album of iridescent pop hits."

Reviewing for Vulture, Kim Youngdae and Park T.K. wrote, "The beat is distinctive, making every part of this song instantly recognizable." In The New York Times, Jon Caramanica shared a similar view, favouring the sound of the song and labelling it as "a fantastically squelchy beat." Billboard's Caitlin Kelley cited it as one of the best songs of BTS and wrote, "the intensity of the song is the product of a potent mixture: an ominous, trap-infused beat rages against boastful lyricism befitting a world class act." Emlyn Travis of PopCrush called "Mic Drop" BTS' "quintessential hip hop track", noting that it evolved the band's sound "while keeping their old roots intact." Chris DeVille from Stereogum viewed the song as "tensely jittery" in which the band "never cease sounding like a boy band even as they lean liberally into hip-hop." In a mixed review for Spin, Monique Melendez felt that the song is "inspiring in its lyrical confidence" but "doesn't push any musical boundaries."

=== Accolades ===
Year-end lists for "Mic Drop"
Publication	List	Rank	Ref.
Billboard	10 Best Dance/Electronic Remixes of 2017: Critics' Picks	—N/a	
Fuse	The 20 Best Songs of 2017	1	
YouTube Rewind	Top 10 Most Popular Music Videos in Korea From 2018	3	

== Commercial performance ==
The original version of "Mic Drop" debuted at number 17 on the Gaon Digital Chart and at number 14 on the component Download Chart on the issue date of September 23, 2017. The song peaked at number six on the Billboard K-pop Hot 100 chart and number seven on the US World Digital Song Sales chart. The remix of "Mic Drop" debuted at number 28 on the US Billboard Hot 100 for the chart issue dated December 16, 2017, becoming the first top 40 entry by a K-pop group on the chart. It also became BTS' first top 40 hit. The single debuted at number one on the US World Digital Songs chart, becoming the band's sixth number one on the chart, and entered the US Digital Song Sales chart at number four. The song charted at number 37 on the Canadian Hot 100 and appeared at number 46 on the UK Singles Chart. Additionally, it peaked at number 5 in Malaysia, number 33 in France, number 26 in Scotland, number 39 in South Korea, number 50 in Australia, and number 71 in Germany. On February 3, 2018, the song was certified gold by the Recording Industry Association of America (RIAA) for track equivalent sales of 500,000 units, making BTS the first Korean group to have a song certified in the United States. The song eventually received platinum certification from the RIAA in November 2018 for track-equivalent sales of one million units, making BTS the first Korean group to achieve this. In April 2019, it was certified gold by the Australian Recording Industry Association (ARIA) for track-equivalent sales of 35,000 units in Australia.

Following the release of the song as a single album in Japan, "Mic Drop / DNA / Crystal Snow" topped the Oricon Daily Singles Chart on its first day of release, selling 269,861 copies. The single remained at number one on the daily chart for the next six days, selling 365,096 physical copies in its first week. By doing so, the band became the first foreign artist to surpass 300,000 copies in a week. "Mic Drop / DNA / Crystal Snow" peaked at number one on the Oricon Weekly Singles Chart for the chart issue dated December 4–10, 2017. For the year end chart, it was the 13th best-selling single of 2017 in the country. "Mic Drop" peaked at number one on the Billboard Japan Hot 100 for the chart issue date of December 18, 2017. On January 15, 2018, the single received double platinum certification from the Recording Industry Association of Japan (RIAJ), denoting shipments of 500,000 copies, making BTS the only foreign artist to achieve this for a single released in 2017.

== Music videos ==
BTS rapper Suga performing the mic drop move at the end of the music video. It was inspired by former US President Barack Obama's mic drop at his final White House Correspondents' Dinner in 2016.

A music video for "Mic Drop" directed by Woogie Kim of GDW, premiered on Big Hit's official YouTube channel at 18:00 KST (01:00 PST) on November 24, 2017; it was preceded by a 59-second teaser released on the same platform on November 16. Hyunwoo Nam was credited as the director of photography and Cathy Kim as the producer. The visual is almost four-minutes long and features several VFX shots. The video opens with Aoki walking towards a console, set against a backdrop of neon-lights. The clip then cuts to show the band inside an interrogation room with several cameras pointed at them. They remain seated before a table which is occupied with microphones. In the following scene, Aoki puts on a pair of headphones and starts DJ-ing. J-Hope jumps over the table and lines up with the rest of the band to perform the song's powerful choreography. The clip is interspersed with scenes featuring the band dancing in multiple settings. In some of these scenes, the band dances in a darkened room with Aoki's figure looming over them in the background, while in others they are in a grungy hallway or inside a prison. Over the course of the video, several black-hooded figures are seen rioting as the band continue to dance in military-style outfits while surrounded by burning cars. The visual ends with the band disappearing from the interrogation room as Suga performs the titular mic drop. A closing shot of Aoki removing his headphones is shown before the clip goes black and the song's title is displayed in red against it. Commenting on the setting of the music video, the director stated in an interview: "Listening to the song, the first thing that came to my mind was that I wanted to lock BTS in an interrogation room. Then I wanted to show the viewers how they managed to escape and free themselves with music."

Critics associated the visual with the theme of rebellion. Stereogum's Tom Breihan listed the visual as one of the five best music videos of its release week. Jennifer Drysdal from Entertainment Tonight called the video "epic" and praised the band's performance writing that the members "command the screen with electrifying dance sequences." Writing for Vice magazine, Phil Witmer deemed the visual as "objectively incredible." The clip was an instant success on YouTube, achieving over 10 million views in 14 hours. "Mic Drop" was the ninth most watched K-pop video of 2017 on YouTube. As of January 2024, the visual has garnered over 1.4 billion views.

An accompanying music video for the Japanese version of the song was uploaded to Universal Music Japan's YouTube channel on December 5, 2017. The setting of the visual is almost identical to the remix music video, except for Aoki's figure, which was replaced by a hooded silhouette with glowing red eyes.

== Live performances and other usage ==
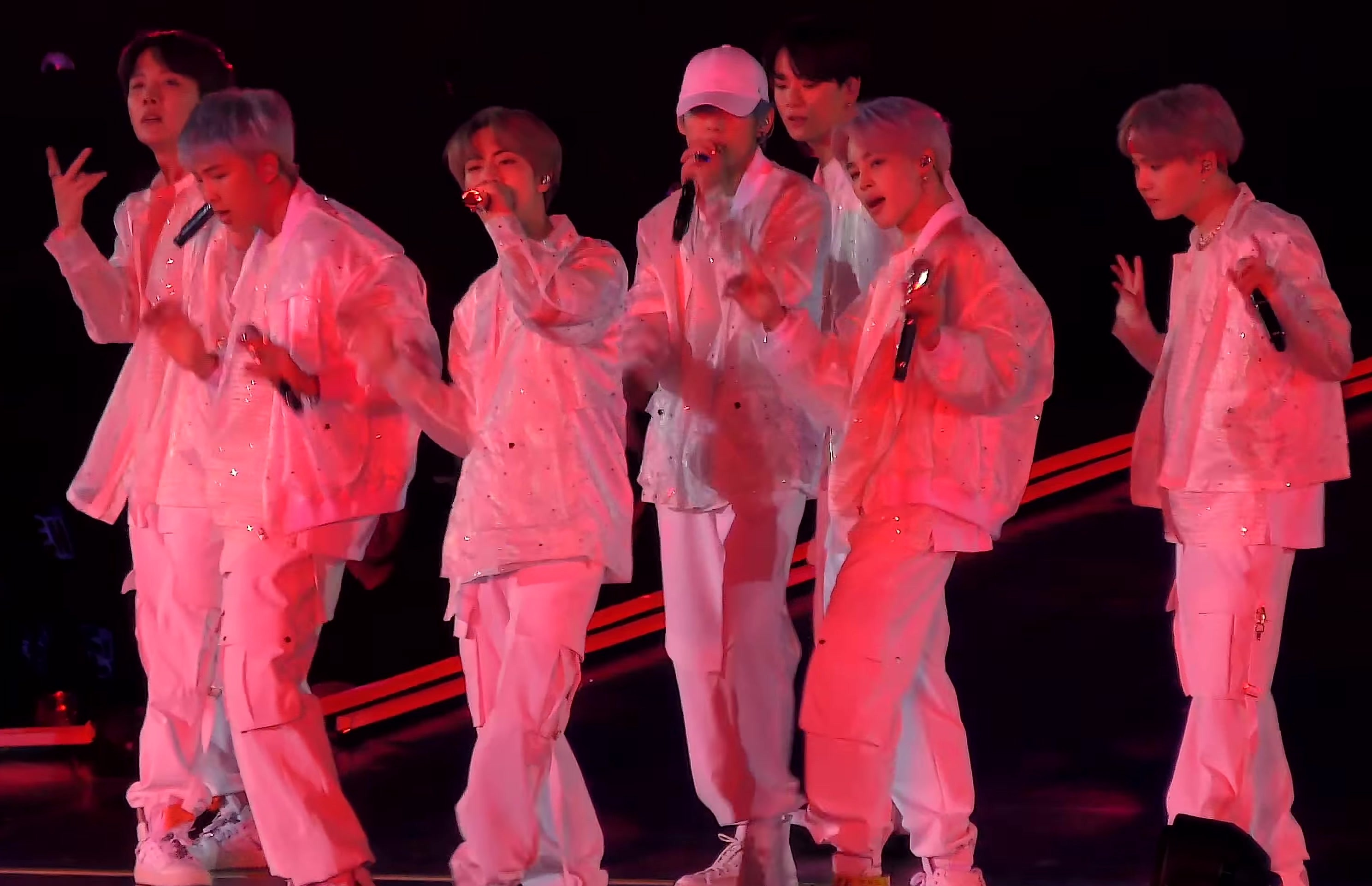
BTS performing "Mic Drop" during the Love Yourself World Tour in Hong Kong on March 24, 2019

Following the release of Love Yourself: Her, BTS appeared on several Korean music programs, including Mnet's M! Countdown, KBS's Music Bank, SBS's Inkigayo and MBC Music's Show Champion to promote the original version of "Mic Drop" and the album. The band performed the song at the SBS Gayo Daejeon music festival on December 25, 2017. They also performed the song on December 31, 2018, at the MBC Gayo Daejejeon, wearing red and black outfits in styles similar to their attire for the music video. Towards the end of the performance, Suga's mic drop move was swapped for a scroll that read "Happy New Year" in Korean when unfurled. On August 11, 2019, the band performed the song during the one-night only Lotte Duty Free Family Concert at the Olympic Gymnastics Arena in Seoul.

BTS performed the remix version of "Mic Drop" live for the first time on The Ellen DeGeneres Show on November 27, 2017. The band performed an "energetic" rendition of the song, trading off vocals and rapping verses on a "stark" stage decorated with flashing lights. Ryan Reed of Rolling Stone praised the performance, calling it "intricately choreographed." They performed the remix again on the November 30 episode of Jimmy Kimmel Live! as part of the Mercedes-Benz Live! concert series, and at the 2017 Mnet Asian Music Awards in Hong Kong on December 1. Additionally, BTS gave a pre-recorded performance of the song on Dick Clark's New Year's Rockin' Eve on December 31, 2017. On April 13, 2019, BTS performed it together with their 2019 single "Boy with Luv" on Saturday Night Live, becoming the first K-pop group to perform on the show. For the performance, the band wore casual and colourful outfits from Virgil Abloh's first menswear collection for Louis Vuitton. It received widespread acclaim in the media as one of the most-anticipated performances in the show's history. Stephen Thompson of NPR wrote: "Lots of bands can seem strangely diminished by the SNL stage on TV, but on Saturday night, BTS filled every inch of the frame with flashy motion — tight choreography, bright colors, bold energy." Tyler Watamanuk of GQ praised "the crooning vocals, precise choreography, and charismatic swagger" while also lauding the "expert-level" on-stage fashion style of the band. Crystal Bell of MTV labelled the performance as "a fiery coronation" and "an epic, electrifying dance break," adding: "Sure, they can be playful, but they're also fierce and they have swagger — and they can dance." Writing for Elle, Alyssa Bailey cited the performance as "real show-stopping." On December 7, 2019, the band performed the song as the opening act of the 2019 iHeartRadio Jingle Ball concert at The Forum, Los Angeles. "Mic Drop" was included on the setlist of BTS' Love Yourself World Tour (2018–19). For performances of the song during the Love Yourself: Speak Yourself stadium extension of the tour, the band wore "retro-futuristic" outfits created by Dior artistic director and fashion designer Kim Jones, from his 2019 menswear pre-fall collection.

HBO series Silicon Valley featured the remix version of "Mic Drop" in the trailer for the show's fifth season. Uzbeki figure skater Misha Ge performed to the song during the figure skating gala event at the 2018 Winter Olympics.

== Track listings ==
Digital download / streaming – Korean version
No.	Title	Length
1.	"Mic Drop"	3:57

Digital download / streaming – Remix version
No.	Title	Length
1.	"Mic Drop" (Steve Aoki remix) (featuring Desiigner)	3:58

Digital download / Regular CD Edition – Japanese version
No.	Title	Length
1.	"Mic Drop"	3:58
2.	"DNA"	3:44
3.	"Crystal Snow"	5:22
Total length:		13:02

Limited Edition A (CD + DVD) – Japanese version
No.	Title	Length
1.	"Mic Drop"	3:58
2.	"DNA"	3:44
3.	"Crystal Snow"	5:22
4.	"Mic Drop" (music video)
5.	"Mic Drop" (music video – dance version)

Limited Edition B (CD + DVD) – Japanese version
No.	Title	Length
1.	"Mic Drop"	3:58
2.	"DNA"	3:44
3.	"Crystal Snow"	5:22
4.	"Mic Drop" (making of music video)
5.	"Mic Drop" (making of jacket photos)

Limited Edition C (CD + Booklet) – Japanese version
No.	Title	Length
1.	"Mic Drop"	3:58
2.	"DNA"	3:44
3.	"Crystal Snow"	5:22

== Credits and personnel ==
Korean and Japanese versions

Credits are adapted from the CD liner notes of Love Yourself: Her.

- BTS – primary vocals
- "Hitman" Bang – songwriter
- Jungkook – chorus
- KASS – gang vocals
- RM – songwriter, gang vocals
- J-Hope – songwriter, gang vocals
- Supreme Boi – vocal arrangement, chorus, gang vocals, production, record engineerer
- Pdogg – rap and vocal arrangements, gang vocals, synthesizer, keyboard, producer, record engineer
- Jaycen Joshua – mix engineer

Remix version

Credits are adapted from Melon.

- BTS – primary vocals
- Desiigner – featured vocals, songwriter
- Steve Aoki – producer, keyboard, synthesizer
- Pdogg – additional producer, synthesizer, gang vocal, rap arrangement, recording engineer
- Supreme Boi – songwriter, chorus, gang vocal, vocal arrangement, recording engineer
- "Hitman" Bang" – songwriter
- J-Hope – songwriter
- RM – songwriter
- Tayla Parx – songwriter
- Flowsik – songwriter
- Shae Jacobs – songwriter
- Jungkook – chorus
- DOCSKIM – gang vocals
- Hiss noise – gang vocals
- Jaycen Joshua – mix engineer
- David Nakaj – assistant mix engineer
- Ben Milchev – assistant mix engineer
- Randy Merrill – mastering engineer

== Charts ==
=== Weekly charts ===
Weekly chart positions for "Mic Drop" Remix version
Chart (2017–18)	Peak position
Australia (ARIA)	50
Austria (Ö3 Austria Top 40)	46
Canada (Canadian Hot 100)	37
Canada CHR/Top 40 (Billboard)	44
Finland Digital Sales (Billboard)	1
France (SNEP)	33
Germany (GfK)	71
Hungary (Single Top 40)	7
Ireland (IRMA)	98
Latvia (DigiTop100)	44
Malaysia (RIM)	5
Mexico Ingles Airplay (Billboard)	49
Netherlands (Single Tip)	20
New Zealand Heatseekers (RMNZ)	1
Scottish Singles Sales (Official Charts)	26
South Korea (Gaon)	39
Sweden Heatseeker (Sverigetopplistan)	8
Switzerland (Schweizer Hitparade)	76
UK Singles (Official Charts)	46
UK Independent Singles	6
US Billboard Hot 100	28
US Dance Airplay (Billboard)	37
US Pop Airplay (Billboard)	25
US Rhythmic Airplay (Billboard)	40
US World Digital Songs (Billboard)	1

Weekly chart positions for "Mic Drop" Original version
Chart (2017)	Peak position
Japan Hot 100 (Billboard) Japanese ver.	1
Japan (Oricon) Japanese ver.	1
South Korea (Gaon)	17
South Korea (K-pop Hot 100)	6
Philippines (Philippine Hot 100)	13
US World Digital Chart (Billboard)	7

=== Year-end charts ===
2017 year-end chart positions for "Mic Drop"
Chart (2017)	Position
Japan (Oricon) Japanese ver.	13

2018 year-end chart positions for "Mic Drop"
Chart (2018)	Position
Japan Hot 100 (Billboard) Japanese ver.	28

== Certifications and sales ==
Certifications and sales
Region	Certification	Certified units/sales
Australia (ARIA) Remix version	Gold	35,000^{‡}
Japan (RIAJ) Japanese version, MIC Drop / DNA / Crystal Snow	2× Platinum	500,000^{^}
New Zealand (RMNZ)	Gold	15,000^{‡}
South Korea	—	337,136
South Korea Remix version	—	80,550
United Kingdom (BPI)	Silver	200,000^{‡}
United States (RIAA)	Platinum	1,000,000^{‡}
Streaming
Japan (RIAJ)	Gold	50,000,000^{†}
^{^} Shipments figures based on certification alone.^{‡} Sales+streaming figures based on certification alone.^{†} Streaming-only figures based on certification alone.

== Release history ==
Release dates and formats
Country	Date	Format(s)	Version	Label(s)	Ref.
Various	September 18, 2017	Digital download; streaming	Korean	Big Hit Entertainment	
Various	November 24, 2017	Digital download; streaming	Remix	Big Hit Entertainment	
United States	December 5, 2017	Contemporary hit radio	Remix	Big Hit; RED Music	
Japan	December 6, 2017	CD single	Japanese	Def Jam; Virgin	
Japan	December 6, 2017	CD+DVD	Japanese	Def Jam; Virgin	
Japan	December 6, 2017	CD+Booklet	Japanese	Def Jam; Virgin	
Various	December 6, 2017	Digital download; streaming	Japanese	Def Jam; Virgin	
