= Face Yourself =

- Digital and regular editions cover

Studio album by BTS
- Released: April 4, 2018
- Genres: J-pop; hip hop
- Length: 44:25
- Languages: Japanese; English
- Labels: Big Hit; Universal; Def Jam; Virgin
- Producers: Pdogg; UTA; Andrew Taggart; Soma Genda

BTS chronology
| Love Yourself: Her (2017) | Face Yourself (2018) | Love Yourself: Tear (2018) |

Singles from Face Yourself
- 1. "Don't Leave Me" Released: April 4, 2018

Face Yourself is the third Japanese and fifth overall studio album by South Korean boy band BTS. It was released on April 4, 2018, through Big Hit, Virgin, Universal Music Japan and Def Jam Recordings. The album contains Japanese versions of songs previously released on the group's second Korean studio album Wings (2016) and the Love Yourself: Her (2017) extended play (EP), as well as three new, original Japanese-language tracks: "Don't Leave Me", "Let Go", and "Crystal Snow". Its debut at number 43 on the Billboard 200 made it the third-highest-charting Japanese album in the history of the chart.

== Background and release ==
The album was announced on February 1, 2018, along with an April 4 release date and details for three limited editions. A tentative tracklist revealed new Japanese recordings of the songs "Go Go" and "Best of Me" from the band's 2017 Korean EP Love Yourself: Her, as well as the inclusion of "Crystal Snow", originally released back in December 2017 as part of a triple A-side single album with the Japanese versions of "Mic Drop" and "DNA". The completed tracklist was released on March 8. That same day, "Don't Leave Me" was announced as the opening theme song for Japanese drama Signal, a remake of the 2016 South Korean television series of the same name. A preview of the song aired on March 15, causing it to chart on the Billboard Japan Hot 100 prior to its official release—it peaked at number 25.

The Japanese translations for "Blood Sweat & Tears", "DNA", "Not Today", "MIC Drop", "Go Go", and "Crystal Snow" were done by Japanese rapper and arranger KM-Markit.

=== Editions ===
Four versions of the album were made available for purchase: three Limited editions, and a CD-only Regular edition. The Type A and B versions both included a 32-page booklet, and featured exclusive content viewable on Blu-ray and DVD respectively. Type C included a 68-page booklet, while the Regular edition contained a 24-page booklet. All albums share a standard track listing.

== Commercial performance ==
The album debuted at number one on Oricon's Daily CD Album chart. It remained there for seven consecutive days, and ranked at number one on the Weekly Album chart with over 282,000 accumulated units sold, breaking a six-year-five-month-long record previously held by Kara, for the highest first-week sales by a Korean artist on the Oricon chart. This made it the highest-grossing album by a male artist on the Oricon chart for 2018 at the time. The album ranked at number 12 on the daily chart on its eighth day of charting, but surged back up over the course of the following weeks, reaching as high as number two. It spent thirteen successive weeks on the Oricon chart, with 324,381 accumulated units sold, and became BTS' first Japanese album to receive Platinum certification from the Recording Industry Association of Japan (RIAJ) on May 10. Oricon announced in June, that Face Yourself and BTS had made the top ten of their "Album Ranking" and "Artist Sales Ranking" charts for the first half of 2018, coming in at fourth and sixth respectively. BTS was the only Korean artist to enter both charts, and the highest ranked international artist. Tower Records Japan reported the album was the second best-selling album by a Korean artist in Japan for 2018.

The album was awarded Double Platinum certification by the RIAJ in January 2019, for selling over 500,000 copies. It was the first album by a Korean act to achieve this since Kara's Super Girl in December 2011.

=== Singles ===
Following the album's release, "Don't Leave Me" entered Oricon's Weekly Digital Singles chart at number 28, with 4,611 digital copies sold for the period dated April 2–8. "Let Go" debuted at number 40 on the Billboard Japan Hot 100, and entered South Korea's Gaon component Download Chart at number 63. In February 2021, the song was certified Silver by the RIAJ for surpassing 30 million streams in Japan, and gold in Brazil, in 2024, for 20,000 equivalents sold.

Four of the album's singles ranked on the Billboard World Digital Song Sales chart in the US. "Dont Leave Me" debuted atop the chart with 9,000 sales, earning the band its record seventh number-one, while "Let Go" followed at number two, and "Intro: Ringwanderung" and "Outro: Crack" entered at numbers four and five respectively.

== Accolades ==
Awards and nominations
| Organization | Year | Award | Result | Ref. |
|---|---|---|---|---|
| Japan Gold Disc Awards | 2019 | Best 3 Albums in the Asia | Won | |
| Japan Gold Disc Awards | 2019 | Album of the Year (Asia) | Won | |

== Track listing ==
=== Original ===
All lyrics are written by KM-Markit.

Type A·B·C and Regular CD
| No. | Title | Writer(s) | Producer(s) | Length |
|---|---|---|---|---|
| 1. | "Intro: Ringwanderung" | "hitman" bang; RM; Suga; J-Hope; Pdogg; Ray Michael Djan Jr.; Adora; UTA; Ashton Foster; Andrew Taggart; Sam Klempner | UTA | 1:26 |
| 2. | "Best of Me" (Japanese version) | Ashton Foster; Andrew Taggart; Sam Klempner; Pdogg; RM; Suga; J-Hope; "hitman" bang; Ray Michael Djan Jr.; Adora | Andrew Taggart; Pdogg | 3:47 |
| 3. | "Blood Sweat & Tears" (Japanese version) | Pdogg; RM; Suga; J-Hope; "hitman" bang; Kim Do Hoon | Pdogg | 3:36 |
| 4. | "DNA" (Japanese version) | "hitman" bang; Kass; Pdogg; Suga; RM; Supreme Boi | Pdogg | 3:43 |
| 5. | "Not Today" (Japanese version) | "hitman" bang; Pdogg; RM; Adora; Supreme Boi; June | Pdogg | 3:53 |
| 6. | "Mic Drop" (Japanese version) | "hitman" bang; Pdogg; J-Hope; RM; Supreme Boi | Pdogg | 3:58 |
| 7. | "Don't Leave Me" | "hitman" bang; Hiro; Pdogg; Sunny Boy; UTA | UTA | 3:47 |
| 8. | "Go Go" (Japanese version) | "hitman" bang; Pdogg; Supreme Boi | Pdogg | 3:57 |
| 9. | "Crystal Snow" | RM; Kanata Okajima; Soma Genda | Soma Genda | 5:23 |
| 10. | "Spring Day" (Japanese version) | "hitman" bang; Adora; RM; Suga; Arlissa Ruppert; Pdogg; Peter Ibsen | Pdogg | 4:36 |
| 11. | "Let Go" | Hiro; Jun; Sunny Boy; UTA | UTA | 4:59 |
| 12. | "Outro: Crack" | UTA | UTA | 1:14 |
| Total length: | | | | 44:19 |

=== Limited Edition Type A·B ===
Face Yourself Blu-ray + DVD
| No. | Title | Length |
|---|---|---|
| 1. | "Blood Sweat & Tears Music Video" (Japanese ver.) |
| 2. | "MIC Drop Music Video" (Japanese ver.) |
| 3. | "MIC Drop Music Video" (Japanese ver.) (dance edit) |
| 4. | "Japan Documentary 5 Days" |
| 5. | "DNA" (Live @ Yokohama Arena Event) |
| 6. | "MIC Drop" (Live @ Yokohama Arena Event) |
| 7. | "Making of Album Jacket Photos" |

== Charts ==
=== Weekly charts ===
Weekly chart performance
| Chart (2018–2022) | Peak position |
|---|---|
| Australian Albums (ARIA) | 71 |
| Austrian Albums (Ö3 Austria) | 42 |
| Belgian Albums (Ultratop Flanders) | 94 |
| Canadian Albums (Billboard) | 40 |
| Croatian International Albums (HDU) | 3 |
| Dutch Albums (Album Top 100) | 116 |
| Estonian Albums (IFPI) | 13 |
| France Digital Albums (SNEP) | 40 |
| Irish Albums (IRMA) | 53 |
| Japanese Albums (Oricon) | 1 |
| Japan Hot Albums (Billboard) | 1 |
| New Zealand Heatseeker Albums (RMNZ) | 7 |
| Polish Albums (ZPAV) | 28 |
| Scottish Albums (Official Charts) | 49 |
| Spanish Albums (PROMUSICAE) | 96 |
| Swiss Albums (Schweizer Hitparade) | 62 |
| UK Albums (Official Charts) | 78 |
| US Billboard 200 | 43 |
| US Top Album Sales (Billboard) | 41 |
| US World Albums (Billboard) | 1 |

=== Monthly charts ===
Monthly chart performance
| Chart (2018) | Position |
|---|---|
| Japanese Albums (Oricon) | 1 |

=== Year-end charts ===
Year-end chart performance
| Chart (2018) | Position |
|---|---|
| Japanese Albums (Oricon) | 7 |
| US World Albums (Billboard) | 13 |

== Certifications and sales ==
| Region | Certification | Certified units/sales |
|---|---|---|
| Canada (Music Canada) | Platinum | 80,000^{‡} |
| Japan (RIAJ) | 2× Platinum | 338,324 (Phy.); 4,871 (Digi.) |
| United Kingdom (BPI) | Gold | 100,000^{‡} |
| United States | — | 4,000 |
^{‡} Sales+streaming figures based on certification alone.

== Release history ==
| Country | Date | Format | Label | Source |
|---|---|---|---|---|
| Japan | April 4, 2018 | CD; DVD; digital download; streaming | Big Hit; Universal; Def Jam; Virgin | |
| Various | April 4, 2018 | Digital download; streaming | Big Hit; Universal; Def Jam; Virgin | |
| United States | November 16, 2018 | CD; digital download; streaming | Big Hit; Universal; Def Jam; Virgin | |
