= We Need to Talk (Tayla Parx album) =

Studio album by Tayla Parx
- Released: April 5, 2019
- Recorded: 2018–2019
- Genre: R&B
- Length: 36:49
- Label: Taylamade; Atlantic
- Producer: A-Dee; Wynne Bennett; Robin Danielsson; Rasool Diaz; Fred; Junior Oliver Frid; Yei Gonzalez; Haze; JFK; Wallis Lane; Joel Malka; Hiko Momoji; Tayla Parx; Pete Nebula; Pierre-Luc Rioux; Mike Sabath; Suburban Plaza; xSDTRK; Quintin Zoto

Tayla Parx chronology
Tayla Made (2017)	We Need to Talk (2019)	A Blue State (2020)

Singles from We Need to Talk
- 1. "Me vs. Us" Released: September 14, 2018; 2. "Slow Dancing" Released: October 19, 2018; 3. "I Want You" Released: March 8, 2019

We Need to Talk is the debut studio album by the American songwriter and singer Tayla Parx, released on April 5, 2019, via her label Taylamade, Inc. and Atlantic Records. The album was preceded by the singles "Me vs. Us", "Slow Dancing", and "I Want You".

== Background ==
After co-writing many songs for artists such as Christina Aguilera, Mariah Carey, BTS. She also co-wrote "Love Lies" by Khalid and Normani, "High Hopes" by Panic! at the Disco and Ariana Grande's number 1 singles "Thank U, Next" and "7 Rings". Parx began writing her album in mid 2018 to early 2019. When interviewed about the album and her own label she said, " lot of labels started to realize that I was writing their artists’ songs and helping their artists come up with an identity for themselves. The last few albums I’ve worked on, I’ve done at least half the album".

== Composition ==
The album was mentioned to have a "common theme of R&B".

== Singles ==
"Me vs. Us" was released as the lead single on September 14, 2020. One month later on October 19, 2020, she released "Slow Dancing" as the second single. The third single of the album, "I Want You", was released along with its music video on March 9, 2019.

== Critical reception ==
Pitchfork mentioned that the best parts are when they "arrive in the moments when Tayla Parx's charisma starts to shine through". But also mentioning that "Tayla encounters the same pitfalls that have held back many songwriters who attempt to break through as performers". Kyle Denis from Black Boy Bullentin mentioned that "We Need to Talk, Tayla floats between sugary pop melodies and disarming verses". Complex Praised, Parx for her work on many other songs and also said "We Need to Talk showcases Parx taking center stage with her talents". Cool Accidents said "We Need To Talk, drops today and yeah, we need to talk about how good it is. It's full of the honest songwriting, pop groove and sparkly production", while also mentioning her work on Ariana Grande's 2019 album Thank U, Next. Billboard mentioned "Parx's debut album is her chance to show and prove. With classical music and acting training growing up, Parx's skillset undeniably developed into a perfect storm for making music".

== Track listing ==
Credits are adapted from Tidal.

No.	Title	Writer(s)	Producer(s)	Length
1.	"I Want You"	Tayla Parx; Wynne Bennett	Bennett	3:05
2.	"Homiesexual"	Parx; Bennett	Bennett	2:47
3.	"Slow Dancing"	Parx; Sangsik Shin	A-Dee	2:24
4.	"Me vs. Us"	Parx; Yonatan Ayal; Nima Jahanbin; Paimon Jahanbin; Rashad Muhammad; Pierre-Luc Rioux	Haze; Rioux; Wallis Lane; xSDTRK	3:17
5.	"What Can I Say (Interlude)"	Parx; Mike Sabath; Quintin Zoto	Parx; Sabath; Zoto	1:30
6.	"Afraid to Fall"	Parx; Lara Andersson; Tyran Donaldson II; Joel Malka	Parx; Malka; Pete Nebula	2:10
7.	"Happy Birthday (Interlude)"	Parx; Kameron Glasper	Parx	0:51
8.	"We Need to Talk"	Parx; Ayal; Hiko Momoji; Jordan Orvosh; Michaela Shiloh	Momoji; xSDTRK	2:10
9.	"Disconnected" (featuring Cautious Clay)	Parx; Glasper; Josh Karpeh; Sabath	Parx; Sabath	1:16
10.	"Read Your Mind" (featuring Duckwrth)	Parx; Donaldson; Jared Lee	Pete Nebula	4:05
11.	"Rebound" (featuring Joey Badass)	Parx; Jaramye Daniels; Rasool Diaz; Jason Fox; Glasper; Kennedi Lykken; Jo-Vaughn Virginie Scott	Diaz; JFK	4:01
12.	"What Do You Know (Interlude)"	Parx; Robin Oliver Frid	Junior Oliver Frid	1:41
13.	"Dirt"	Parx; Derrell Jackson; Deon Knight Jr.; Antoine Norwood	Suburban Plaza	2:37
14.	"Tomboys Have Feelings Too (Interlude)"	Parx; Andersson; Donaldson; Robin Danielsson	Parx; Pete Nebula; Danielsson	1:24
15.	"Easy"	Parx; Fred Gibson; Yei Gonzalez	Fred; Gonzalez	3:24
Total length:				36:49

== Personnel ==
Credits are adapted from Tidal.

=== Musicians ===
- Tayla Parx – vocals (all tracks), programming (tracks 7, 9, 14)
- Wynne Bennett – programming (1, 2)
- A-Dee – programming (3)
- xSDTRK – programming (4, 8)
- Haze – programming (4)
- Pierre-Luc Rioux – programming (4)
- Wallis Lane – programming (4)
- Mike Sabath – programming (5, 9)
- Quintin Zoto – programming (5), additional guitar (14)
- Pete Nebula – programming (6, 10, 14)
- Joel Malka – programming (6)
- JordanXL – additional piano (8)
- Mickey Shiloh – ad lib vocals (8)
- Hiko Momoji – programming (8)
- Cautious Clay – featured vocals (9)
- Duckwrth – featured vocals (10)
- Joey Badass – featured vocals (11)
- JFK – programming (11)
- Rasool Diaz – programming (11)
- Junior Oliver Frid – programming (12)
- Suburban Plaza – programming (13)
- Robin Danielsson – programming (14)
- Fred – programming (15)
- Yei Gonzalez – programming (15)

=== Technical ===
- Tayla Parx – engineering (1, 2, 4–7, 9, 11, 14)
- Jaime P. Velez – engineering (3, 8, 10, 12, 13, 15), additional mixing (2–7, 9, 10, 14, 15)
- Thom Kahre – engineering (10)
- Juan "Saucy" Peña – vocal engineering (11)
- Erik Madrid – mixing (1, 3, 8, 11)
- Mikaelin Bluespruce – mixing (2, 4–7, 9, 10, 12–15)
- Aaron Mattes – mixing assistance (1, 3, 8, 11)
- Chris Gehringer – mastering
