= XSDTRK =

Canadian musician

xSDTRK
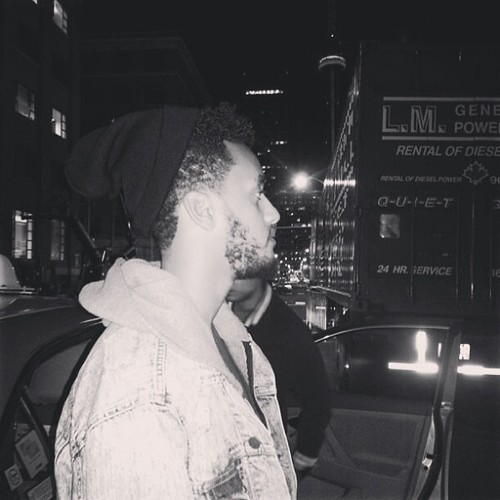

Background information
- Also known as: Yoni, Soundtrack
- Born: Yonatan Ayal; Montreal, Canada
- Genres: Pop, R&B, soul, rock, alternative, industrial
- Occupations: Record producer, songwriter, singer, musician
- Instruments: Vocals, guitar, piano, drums, keyboard, sampler, drum machine, DAW
- Years active: 2009–present
- Labels: Primary Wave, BMG
- Website: xsdtrk.com

Yonatan Ayal, known professionally as xSDTRK (pronounced "soundtrack"), is a Canadian songwriter and music producer. Starting with the piano at the age of three, XSDTRK studied at the Toronto Royal Conservatory, and has since moved on to become a multi-instrumentalist working in various musical genres.

Ayal and fellow Canadian musician Pierre-Luc Rioux formed alternative R&B group Chiiild in 2020, releasing projects Synthetic Soul (2020), Hope for Sale (2022), and Better Luck In The Next Life.(2023)

== Discography ==
=== Selected production and songwriting discography ===
Credits are courtesy of Discogs, Tidal, Apple Music, and AllMusic.

Title	Year	Artist	Album
"Acting Like That" (featuring Iggy Azalea)	2014	Jennifer Lopez	A.K.A.
"So Good"	2014	Jennifer Lopez	A.K.A.
"Sweet Talker"	2014	Jessie J	Sweet Talker
"Mind" (featuring Kai)	2015	Jack Ü	Jack Ü
"Thunder"	2016	Chloe x Halle	Sugar Symphony
"Hard II Love"	2016	Usher	Hard II Love
"Drowning"	2018	Mario	Dancing Shadows
"We Need To Talk"	2019	Tayla Parx	We Need to Talk
"Me vs. Us"	2019	Tayla Parx	We Need to Talk
"Dive"	2020	Victoria Monét	Jaguar
"Go There with You"	2020	Victoria Monét	Jaguar
"Party Girls" (featuring Buju Banton)	2023	Victoria Monét	Jaguar II
"Stop (Askin' Me 4Shyt)"	2023	Victoria Monét	Jaguar II
"2Sexy" (Interlude)	2023	Victoria Monét	Jaguar II
"1900's"	2023	Victoria Monét	Jaguar II
"Spin" (featuring Victoria Monét)	2024	Megan Thee Stallion	Megan

==== Singles ====
Year	Single	Chart positions		Certifications	Role
Year	Single	CAN	JPN	Certifications	Role
2017	"Body 2 Body" by Dragonette	—	—		Writer & Producer
2017	"Fuck it tho" by Keshia Chante	—	—		Writer & Producer
2016	"Mind" by Jack U	—	—		Co-Writer
2015	"Hold on Forever" by Rob Thomas	—	—		Programmer
2014	"Revolution" by Catey Shaw	—	—		Co-Writer
2013	"Oxygen" by RyanMcDermott	—	—		Writer & Producer
2013	"Tell the world" by Jesse Labelle	28	—		Writer & Producer
2011	"Whatta Night" by Ricky J	42	—	CAN: Gold	Producer
2010	"80's Baby" by Karl Wolf	—	—		Producer
2009	"Yalla Habibi" by Karl Wolf	24	51	CAN: Gold	Producer

== Awards and nominations ==
Awards and nominations for xSDTRK
Year	Award	Category	Nominated Work	Result
2011	Juno Awards	R&B/Soul Recording of the Year	Nightlife by Karl Wolf	Nominated
2011	SOCAN	Anglophone Song of the Year	"Whatta Night"	Won
2016	Grammy Awards	Best Dance/Electronic Album	Skrillex and Diplo Present Jack Ü	Won
