= Love Yourself: Her =

Extended play by BTS

- Digital cover

EP by BTS
- Released: September 18, 2017
- Recorded: 2017
- Genres: Pop; R&B; hip hop; EDM; electropop
- Length: 30:33
- Languages: Korean; English
- Labels: Big Hit; Loen; Universal
- Producer: Pdogg

BTS chronology
| Wings (2016) | Love Yourself: Her (2017) | Face Yourself (2018) |

Singles from Love Yourself: Her
- 1. "DNA" Released: September 18, 2017; 2. "Mic Drop" Released: November 24, 2017

Love Yourself: Her (stylized as LOVE YOURSELF 承 'Her') is the fifth extended play by South Korean boy group BTS. The EP was released on September 18, 2017, by Big Hit Entertainment. The album was released in four versions and contains nine tracks, with "DNA" as its lead single.

== Background ==
Love Yourself: Her is the first album to be released since BTS revealed their new "brand identity" on July 4, 2017, complete with a new, simplified logo. On September 18, the album was released alongside the music video for its lead single, "DNA". In the 24 hours after release, the "DNA" music video had been viewed 21 million times, becoming the first K-pop group music video to reach over 20 million views in 24 hours.

== Composition ==
Sonically, the EP served as "a dual exploration of the group's electro-pop and hip-hop leanings," with the first half consisting of "dance tracks that emphasize the group's vocals" while in the second half "the act's hip-hop side arrives in earnest...delivering powerful rap performances."

"Love Yourself" series which sought the enlightenment of self-love through the "起承轉結" (Korean: 기승전결; RR: giseungjeongyeol) narrative sequence of "beginning, development, turn, and conclusion." In the narrative sequence, the EP represented the "承," or "development" of the series and is considered by RM to be one of the major turning points in BTS' career. Within the larger narrative, Love Yourself: Her described the joy and happiness of falling in love.

== Commercial performance ==
Love Yourself: Her recorded 1,051,546 stock pre-orders from August 25–31, making BTS the first K-pop group to reach and cross one million pre-orders with a single album. The EP debuted at number one on the South Korean Gaon Album Chart, while its lead single "DNA" debuted at number two on the Gaon Digital Chart—all tracks from the EP also placed in the top 40 of the chart. According to the monthly Album Chart, released on October 14, the album was the highest-selling release of September 2017, with 1,203,533 copies sold since its release on September 18. The album also had the second highest monthly sales in the history of the Gaon Chart, and was the first in 16 years to exceed 1.2 million copies sold since g.o.d's fourth album Chapter 4 (2001). It won the grand prize at the 32nd Golden Disc Awards in the Physical Category on January 11, 2018, and went on become BTS' highest-selling album at the time, surpassing Wings (2016). It is one of the best-selling albums in Gaon Chart history, with over 2.2 million copies sold as of April 2020.

The EP opened at number seven on the US Billboard 200 with 31,000 album-equivalent units—18,000 were pure album sales—marking the biggest sales week for a K-pop album on the chart and making it the highest-charting K-pop album in Billboard chart history, until the release of BTS' own Love Yourself: Tear in 2018. BTS became the first Asian artist in seven years to debut within the top ten of the chart, surpassing the record set by Filipino singer Charice who debuted at number eight in 2010 with her eponymous American debut album. The album remained on the Billboard 200 for 44 weeks, becoming the first Korean album to do so. Following its reissue on vinyl in 2023, Love Yourself: Her sold a further 21,000 units in the country and reentered the top 20 of the Billboard 200 at number 13, on the issue dated January 21, 2023, marking its 45th non-consecutive week on the chart. It was the second best-selling album of the week overall, and the best-selling release on the format, with 18,000 pure sales, earning BTS their first number one on the Vinyl Albums chart. It also repeaked atop the World Albums chart for the same issue date.

Elsewhere, the EP peaked at number one on the Oricon Albums Chart in Japan in its second week, and earned BTS their debut on the UK Albums Chart when it peaked at number 14 on the issue dated October 7, 2017.

== Reception ==
Professional ratings
Review scores
| Source | Rating |
|---|---|
| IZM | 3/5 stars |
| The Star | 7/10 |

Billboard writer Tamar Herman described the EP as "a dual exploration of the group's electro-pop and hip-hop leanings", with the first half consisting of “dance tracks that emphasize the group's vocals" while in the second half "the act's hip-hop side arrives in earnest...delivering powerful rap performances." Viri Garcia of The Cornell Daily Sun commended BTS for "trying to achieve a sound closer to pop while keeping their own signature sounds" and succeeding in creating a "masterpiece full of emotion and musicality that can't be paralleled by any American or Korean act." However, Monique Melendez from Spin summarized the album as "thematically confident in its separate halves but musically disparate", with the group refusing to compromise on a specific musical direction. Melendez further commented that Love Yourself 承 'Her' came up short compared to BTS' past works, such as Wings and The Most Beautiful Moment in Life, Part 1 and Part 2, in which "visuals, lyrics, and sounds united under fully-realized concepts."

The EP's lead single "DNA" was featured on Vulture as one of the "8 Best New Songs of the Week", describing the track as the "sound of a boy band headed in a new direction plotted for crossover domination“ and one that "recategorizes BTS by shrugging off genre entirely." The New York Times pop music critic Jon Caramanica wrote that while BTS' music often exhibits the “flamboyance and sometimes manic energy" that is characteristic of K-pop, Love Yourself: Her takes a remarkably "tranquil approach” to the genre through side tracks such as "Pied Piper", which he described as "a slow disco number that's emphatic in its relaxation." Caramanica additionally highlighted "Outro: Her" as a track with a hip hop beat that is "lush with instrumentation, and moves with a casual saunter reminiscent of the mid 1990s." Tamar Herman also offered praises for the lyrical delivery of "Pied Piper", and stated, "A take on K-pop's rampant and highly profitable fan culture, 'Pied Piper,' is BTS doing what they do best: addressing a societal problem through their jaunty music." Herman called the track "BTS' most subversive song of their career."

== Accolades ==
Year-end lists
| Critic/Publication | List | Rank | Ref. |
|---|---|---|---|
| Affinity Magazine | Top 10 Best K-Pop Albums of 2017 | 8 | |
| Bandwagon | Best Albums of 2017: Staff Picks | —N/a | |
| Billboard | The 20 Best K-pop Albums of 2017: Critics' Picks | 3 | |
| Interpark | Best Albums of 2017 | 3 | |
| SBS | 2017 Best Albums | 3 | |

Awards
| Year | Organization | Award | Result | Ref |
|---|---|---|---|---|
| 2017 | Mnet Asian Music Awards | Qoo10 Album of the Year | Nominated | |
| 2017 | Hanteo Awards | Album Award | Won | |
| 2017 | 10th Philippine K-pop Awards | Album of the Year | Won | |
| 2018 | Golden Disc Awards | Album Division – Bonsang | Won | |
| 2018 | Golden Disc Awards | Album Division – Daesang | Won | |
| 2018 | Korean Music Awards | Best Pop Album | Nominated | |

== Track listing ==
The credits are adapted from the official album profile on Naver.

| No. | Title | Writer(s) | Producer(s) | Length |
|---|---|---|---|---|
| 1. | "Intro: Serendipity" | "hitman" bang; Slow Rabbit; RM; Ray Michael Djan Jr; Ashton Foster | Slow Rabbit | 2:19 |
| 2. | "DNA" | Pdogg; "hitman" bang; Supreme Boi; Suga; RM; Kass | Pdogg | 3:43 |
| 3. | "Best of Me" | Andrew Taggart; Pdogg; RM; Suga; J-Hope; "hitman" bang; Ray Michael Djan Jr; Ashton Foster; Adora; Sam Klempner | Andrew Taggart; Pdogg | 3:46 |
| 4. | "Dimple" (보조개) | Allison Kaplan; Matthew Tishler; RM | Matthew Tishler; Crash Cove | 3:16 |
| 5. | "Pied Piper" | Jinbo; "hitman" bang; RM; Suga; J-Hope; Pdogg; Kass | Pdogg | 4:05 |
| 6. | "Skit: Billboard Music Awards Speech" | Pdogg | Pdogg | 1:43 |
| 7. | "Mic Drop" | Pdogg; "hitman" bang; J-Hope; RM; Supreme Boi | Pdogg | 3:57 |
| 8. | "Go Go" (고민보다 Go) | "hitman" bang; Supreme Boi; Pdogg | Pdogg | 3:55 |
| 9. | "Outro: Her" | Suga; Slow Rabbit; RM; J-Hope | Suga; Slow Rabbit | 3:49 |
| Total length: | | | | 30:33 |

Physical edition hidden tracks
| No. | Title | Writer(s) | Producer(s) | Length |
|---|---|---|---|---|
| 10. | "Skit: Hesitation and Fear" (Skit: 망설임과 두려움) | "hitman" bang; Pdogg | "hitman" bang; Pdogg | 8:32 |
| 11. | "Sea" (바다) | RM; Slow Rabbit; Suga; J-Hope | RM | 5:15 |
| Total length: | | | | 44:20 |

== Charts ==
=== Weekly charts ===
Weekly chart performance
| Chart (2017–2022) | Peak position |
|---|---|
| Argentine Albums (CAPIF) | 3 |
| Australian Albums (ARIA) | 8 |
| Austrian Albums (Ö3 Austria) | 17 |
| Belgian Albums (Ultratop Flanders) | 18 |
| Belgian Albums (Ultratop Wallonia) | 51 |
| Canadian Albums (Billboard) | 3 |
| Chinese Albums (Billboard V Chart) | 2 |
| Croatian International Albums (HDU) | 20 |
| Danish Albums (Hitlisten) | 34 |
| Dutch Albums (MegaCharts) | 19 |
| Finnish Albums (Suomen virallinen lista) | 11 |
| French Albums (SNEP) | 96 |
| German Albums (Offizielle Top 100) | 26 |
| Hungarian Albums (MAHASZ) | 9 |
| Irish Albums (IRMA) | 19 |
| Italian Albums (FIMI) | 56 |
| Japanese Albums (Oricon) | 1 |
| Japanese Digital Albums (Oricon) | 1 |
| Japan Hot Albums (Billboard) | 4 |
| Latvian Albums (LaIPA) | 65 |
| New Zealand Albums (RMNZ) | 9 |
| Mexican Albums (AMPROFON) | 22 |
| Norwegian Albums (VG-lista) | 16 |
| Scottish Albums (Official Charts) | 17 |
| Slovak Albums (ČNS IFPI) | 17 |
| South Korean Albums (Gaon) | 1 |
| South Korean Albums (Circle) LP version | 5 |
| Spanish Albums (Promusicae) | 33 |
| Swedish Albums (Sverigetopplistan) | 13 |
| Swiss Albums (Schweizer Hitparade) | 26 |
| UK Albums (Official Charts) | 14 |
| US Billboard 200 | 7 |
| US Independent Albums (Billboard) | 2 |
| US Internet Albums (Billboard) | 1 |
| US Top Album Sales (Billboard) | 6 |
| US World Albums (Billboard) | 1 |

=== Monthly charts ===
Monthly chart performance
| Chart (2017) | Peak position |
|---|---|
| Japanese Albums (Oricon) | 1 |
| South Korean Albums (Gaon) | 1 |

=== Year-end charts ===
Year-end chart performance
| Chart (2017) | Position |
|---|---|
| Chinese Albums (YinYueTai) | 16 |
| Japanese Albums (Oricon) | 48 |
| South Korean Albums (Gaon) | 1 |
| US World Albums (Billboard) | 2 |
| US Independent Albums (Billboard) | 32 |
| Chart (2018) | Position |
| Chinese Albums (YinYueTai) | 15 |
| Estonian Albums (Eesti Ekspress) | 77 |
| Mexican Albums AMPROFON | 59 |
| South Korean Albums (Gaon) | 11 |
| US Billboard 200 | 150 |
| US Independent Albums (Billboard) | 9 |
| US World Albums (Billboard) | 3 |
| Chart (2019) | Position |
| Hungarian Albums - Rank (MAHASZ) | 35 |
| Hungarian Albums - Sales (MAHASZ) | 71 |
| South Korean Albums (Gaon) | 13 |
| US Independent Albums (Billboard) | 17 |
| US World Albums (Billboard) | 8 |
| Chart (2020) | Position |
| South Korean Albums (Gaon) | 58 |
| Chart (2021) | Position |
| Japanese Albums (Oricon) | 99 |
| South Korean Albums (Gaon) | 35 |
| Chart (2022) | Position |
| South Korean Albums (Circle) | 51 |

== Certifications and sales ==
Certifications and sales
| Region | Certification | Certified units/sales |
|---|---|---|
| Canada (Music Canada) | Platinum | 80,000^{‡} |
| Denmark (IFPI Danmark) | Gold | 10,000^{‡} |
| France (SNEP) | Gold | 50,000^{‡} |
| Japan | — | 88,664 |
| New Zealand (RMNZ) | Gold | 7,500^{‡} |
| Singapore (RIAS) | Gold | 5,000^{*} |
| South Korea | — | 2,710,188 |
| United Kingdom (BPI) | Gold | 100,000^{‡} |
| United States | — | 36,000 |
^{*} Sales figures based on certification alone.^{‡} Sales+streaming figures based on certification alone.

== Release history ==
Release history and formats for Love Yourself: Her
| Country | Date | Format | Label |
|---|---|---|---|
| South Korea | September 18, 2017 | CD; digital download; streaming audio | Big Hit; Loen |
| United States | September 18, 2017 | CD; digital download; streaming audio | Big Hit; Loen |
| Japan | September 18, 2017 | CD; digital download; streaming audio | Big Hit; Loen; Universal |
| Various | September 18, 2017 | digital download; streaming audio | Big Hit |
| Various | December 5, 2022 | Vinyl | Big Hit; Universal |
| Japan | December 7, 2022 | Vinyl | Big Hit; Universal |
| United States | January 6, 2023 | Vinyl | Big Hit; Universal |

== See also ==
- List of K-pop songs on the Billboard charts
- List of K-pop albums on the Billboard charts
- List of Gaon Album Chart number ones of 2017
