= Jimin discography =

- Jimin for Dispatch White Day Special, 27 February 2019
- Studio albums: 2
- Singles: 11
- Music videos: 8

South Korean singer Jimin has released two studio albums, eleven singles, and eight music videos. As a member of the boy band BTS since 2013, he has contributed to both group and solo projects. He began his solo career in 2023 with the release of the studio album Face, which featured the singles "Set Me Free Pt. 2" and "Like Crazy".

== Studio albums ==
List of studio albums showing select chart positions and sales
Title	Album details	Peak chart positions										Sales	Certifications
Title	Album details	KOR	CAN	GER	ITA	JPN	NLD	NZ	UK	US	US World	Sales	Certifications
Face	Released: March 24, 2023; Label: Big Hit Music; Formats: CD, digital download, streaming	1	10	7	29	1	35	8	—	2	1	KOR: 1,615,915; JPN: 248,839; US: 156,000; WW: 1,700,000	KMCA: Million (Note: Regular edition); KMCA: Platinum (Note: Weverse Albums edition); RIAJ: Platinum
Muse	Released: July 19, 2024; Label: Big Hit Music; Formats: CD, digital download, streaming	2	24	6	19	3	23	17	56	2	1	KOR: 771,129; JPN: 104,292; US: 74,000	KMCA: 2× Platinum (Note: Regular edition); RIAJ: Gold

== Singles ==
=== As lead artist ===
Title	Year	Peak chart positions										Sales	Certifications	Album
Title	Year	KOR	AUS	CAN	HUN	JPN Hot	NZ Hot	UK	US	US World	WW	Sales	Certifications	Album
"Promise" (약속)	2018	—	—	—	5	—	—	—	— (Note: "Promise" & "Christmas Love" did not enter the Billboard Hot 100, but debuted at numbers 18 and 34 respectively on the Digital Songs chart.)	2	—	JPN: 8,184		Non-album singles
"Christmas Love"	2020	—	—	—	—	—	—	—	—	3	—	JPN: 7,158		Non-album singles
"With You" (with Ha Sung-woon)	2022	15	—	—	2	—	13	—	— (Note: "With You" did not enter the Billboard Hot 100 but debuted at number one on the Digital Songs chart.)	—	19	JPN: 8,553; US: 9,800; WW: 39,400		Our Blues OST
"Set Me Free Pt. 2"	2023	24	71	45	2	59	4	30	30	1	8	JPN: 9,102; US: 63,000; WW: 42,000		Face
"Like Crazy"	2023	8	23	21	3	43	5	8	1	1	2	JPN: 3,308; US: 296,000; WW: 86,000	MC: Platinum; RIAA: Platinum	Face
"Angel Pt. 2" (with Jvke, featuring Charlie Puth and Muni Long)	2023	128	—	—	—	—	23	—	—	—	—	JPN: 3,500		Non-album single
"Closer Than This"	2023	42	—	—	—	84	3	—	— (Note: "Closer Than This" did not enter the Billboard Hot 100 but debuted at number four on the Bubbling Under Hot 100 chart.)	1	55	JPN: 10,366		Muse
"Smeraldo Garden Marching Band" (featuring Loco)	2024	44	—	—	—	77	6	46	88	1	16	JPN: 5,520; US: 11,000		Muse
"Who"	2024	33	—	32	—	21	2	4	12	—	1	JPN: 7,520; US: 70,000; WW: 193,000	BPI: Gold; MC: Platinum; RIAJ: Platinum (st.)	Muse
"—" denotes releases that did not chart or were not released in that region.

=== As featured artist ===
Title	Year	Peak chart positions										Sales	Album
Title	Year	KOR	KOR Billb.	AUS	CAN	JPN Hot	NZ Hot	UK	US	US World	WW	Sales	Album
"Vibe" (Taeyang featuring Jimin)	2023	5	4	48	59	32	8	96	76	1	12	JPN: 12,010; US: 20,000; WW: 22,000	Down to Earth
"Angel Pt. 1" (Kodak Black and NLE Choppa featuring Jimin, Jvke, and Muni Long)	2023	72	11	—	63	80	6	82	65	—	16	JPN: 7,752	Fast X: Original Motion Picture Soundtrack

== Other charted songs ==
Title	Year	Peak chart positions										Sales	Album
Title	Year	KOR	KOR Hot	CAN	HUN	JPN Dig.	NZ Hot	UK	US	US World	WW	Sales	Album
"Lie" (Note: released under BTS but is a solo track performed by Jimin)	2016	19	—	—	—	—	—	—	—	2	—	KOR: 114,691	Wings
"Intro: Serendipity" (Note: released under BTS but is a solo track performed by Jimin)	2017	18	7	—	—	—	— (Note: "Serendipity" did not enter the NZ Singles or Hot Singles Charts, but debuted at number eight on the component Heatseekers chart.)	—	—	2	—	KOR: 114,128	Love Yourself: Her
"Serendipity" (Full length edition) (Note: extended version of the intro by Jimin; credited as just "Serendipity" on some charts and "Serendipity" (Full length edition) on others)	2019	77	9	— (Note: "Serendipity" (Full length edition) did not enter the Canadian Hot 100, but debuted at number 39 on the Canadian Digital Song Sales chart.)	19	—	—	— (Note: "Serendipity" did not enter the UK Singles Chart, but debuted at number 64 on the component Downloads Chart.)	— (Note: "Serendipity" (Full length edition) did not enter the Billboard Hot 100, but debuted at number 29 on the Digital Songs chart.)	5	—	US: 10,000	Love Yourself: Answer
"Filter" (Note: released under BTS but is a solo track performed by Jimin)	2020	15	9	88	6	—	10	100	87	1	—	US: 17,000	Map of the Soul: 7
"Face-Off"	2023	64	—	—	—	34	25	— (Note: "Face-Off" did not enter the UK Singles Chart, but debuted at number 52 on the component Downloads Chart.)	— (Note: "Face-Off" did not enter the Billboard Hot 100, but debuted at number eight on the Digital Songs chart.)	4	133	JPN: 1,616	Face
"Interlude: Dive"	2023	136	—	—	—	44	—	— (Note: "Interlude: Dive" did not enter the UK Singles Chart, but debuted number 81 on the component Downloads Chart.)	— (Note: "Interlude: Dive" did not enter the Billboard Hot 100, but debuted at number 15 on the Digital Songs chart.)	—	—	JPN: 1,326	Face
"Alone"	2023	112	—	—	—	37	33	— (Note: "Alone" did not enter the UK Singles Chart, but debuted number 60 on the component Downloads Chart.)	— (Note: "Alone" did not enter the Billboard Hot 100, but debuted at number 12 on the Digital Songs chart.)	5	189	JPN: 1,454	Face
"Like Crazy" (English version)	2023	156	—	—	—	30	—	—	—	—	—	JPN: 1,699	Face
"Like Crazy" (Deep House Remix)	2023	— (Note: "Like Crazy" (Deep House Remix) did not enter the Circle Digital Chart, but peaked at number 49 on the component Download Chart.)	—	—	—	29	—	—	—	—	—	JPN: 1,725	Like Crazy (Remixes)
"Like Crazy" (UK Garage Remix)	2023	— (Note: "Like Crazy" (UK Garage Remix) did not enter the Circle Digital Chart, but peaked at number 62 on the component Download Chart.)	—	—	—	38	—	—	—	—	—	JPN: 1,439	Like Crazy (Remixes)
"Like Crazy" (Instrumental)	2023	— (Note: "Like Crazy" (Instrumental) did not enter the Circle Digital Chart, but peaked at number 110 on the component Download Chart.)	—	—	—	—	—	—	—	—	—		Like Crazy (Remixes)
"Rebirth (Intro)"	2024	129	—	—	—	—	35	—	—	2	187		Muse
"Interlude: Showtime"	2024	140	—	—	—	—	—	—	—	—	—		Muse
"Slow Dance" (featuring Sofia Carson)	2024	122	—	—	—	—	32	—	—	—	159		Muse
"Be Mine"	2024	116	—	—	—	—	31	—	—	—	89		Muse
"Who" (Instrumental)	2024	— (Note: "Who" (Instrumental) did not enter the Circle Digital Chart, but peaked at number 94 on the component Download Chart.)	—	—	—	—	—	—	—	—	—		Who (Remixes)
"Who" (Acoustic Remix)	2024	— (Note: "Who" (Acoustic Remix) did not enter the Circle Digital Chart, but peaked at number 52 on the component Download Chart.)	—	—	—	—	—	—	—	—	—		Who (Remixes)
"Who" (Rock Remix)	2024	— (Note: "Who" (Rock Remix) did not enter the Circle Digital Chart, but peaked at number 64 on the component Download Chart.)	—	—	—	—	—	—	—	—	—		Who (Remixes)
"Who" (Shibukayei Remix)	2024	— (Note: "Who" (Shibukayei Remix) did not enter the Circle Digital Chart, but peaked at number 79 on the component Download Chart.)	—	—	—	—	—	—	—	—	—		Who (Remixes)
"Who" (Funky Remix)	2024	— (Note: "Who" (Funky Remix) did not enter the Circle Digital Chart, but peaked at number 81 on the component Download Chart.)	—	—	—	—	—	—	—	—	—		Who (Remixes)
"Who" (Beautiful Mind Remix)	2024	— (Note: "Who" (Beautiful Mind Remix) did not enter the Circle Digital Chart, but peaked at number 86 on the component Download Chart.)	—	—	—	—	—	—	—	—	—		Who (Remixes)
"Be Mine" (English version)	2024	— (Note: "Be Mine" (English version) did not enter the Circle Digital Chart, but peaked at number 34 on the component Download Chart.)	—	—	—	25	—	—	—	—	—	JPN: 2,022	Non-album song
"—" denotes releases that did not chart or were not released in that region.

=== Other songs ===
Title	Year	Notes	Ref.
"95 Graduation" by Jimin & V	2014	Graduation song for the two BTS members	
"Christmas Day" by Jimin & Jungkook	2014	Korean cover of "Mistletoe" by Justin Bieber	
"We Don't Talk Anymore Pt.2" by Jimin & Jungkook	2017	Cover of "We Don't Talk Anymore" by Charlie Puth and Selena Gomez	

== Writing credits ==
All song credits are adapted from the Korea Music Copyright Association's database, unless otherwise noted.

Name of song, featured performers, original release, and year of release
Song	Artist(s)	Album	Year
"Alone"	Jimin	Face	2023
"Be Mine" (Note: original and English version)	Jimin	Muse	2024
"Boyz with Fun"	BTS	The Most Beautiful Moment in Life, Part 1	2015
"Christmas Day"	Jimin and Jungkook	Non-album release	2014
"Christmas Love"	Jimin	Non-album single	2020
"Closer Than This"	Jimin	Muse	2023
"Dis-ease"	BTS	Be	2020
"Face-off"	Jimin	Face	2023
"Friends"	BTS	Map of the Soul: 7	2020
"Interlude: Showtime"	Jimin	Muse	2024
"In the Soop"	BTS	Non-album release	2020
"Into the Sun"	BTS	Arirang	2026
"Letter" (Note: hidden track on the physical album only) (Note: listed on KOMCA as "Dear Army")	Jimin	Face	2023
"Lie"	BTS	Wings	2016
"Like Crazy" (Note: original and English version)	Jimin	Face	2023
"Outro: Circle Room Cypher"	BTS	2 Cool 4 Skool	2013
"Promise"	Jimin	Non-album single	2018
"Rebirth (Intro)"	Jimin	Muse	2024
"Set Me Free Pt. 2"	Jimin	Face	2023
"Skit"	BTS	Be	2020
"Slow Dance"	Jimin featuring Sofia Carson	Muse	2024
"Smeraldo Garden Marching Band"	Jimin featuring Loco	Muse	2024
"They Don't Know 'Bout Us"	BTS	Arirang	2026
"Vibe" (Note: also credited as co-composer)	Taeyang featuring Jimin	Down to Earth	2023

== Music videos ==
Name of music video, year released, other credited artist(s), director, and description
Title	Year	Other performer(s) credited	Director(s)	Description	Ref.
"Intro: Serendipity"	2017	None	Yong-seok Choi & Won-ju Lee (Lumpens)	comeback trailer for BTS' 2017 album Love Yourself: Her	
"Vibe"	2023	Taeyang		Taeyang and Jimin perform the song and its accompanying choreography solo and together on a large stage with flashing lights while wearing coordinating outfits.	
"Set Me Free Pt. 2"	2023	None	Oui Kim	Jimin acts as the centerpiece of an elaborate, synchronized choreography routine performed together with a large group of dancers on a panopticon-like set while surrounded by flashing lights.	
"Like Crazy"	2023	None	Oui Kim	Jimin sings the song while seated alone in a kitchen before being pulled into a nightclub scene where he parties with clubgoers and sings while alone in the bathroom of the club. He returns to the kitchen at the end, alone once again.	
"Angel Pt. 1"	2023	Kodak Black, NLE Choppa, Jvke, Muni Long		All five artists are shown performing the song from either the rooftops of various buildings or while driving fast cars. Jimin is first seen singing atop a building in New York City during sunset, then later on a soundstage with Long as psychedelic visuals play in the background.	
"Closer Than This"	2023	None		Comprises behind-the-scenes footage of Jimin during the song's writing and recording process, and clips of BTS with their fans at various fan meeting and concert events from debut to present.	
"Smeraldo Garden Marching Band"	2024	Loco		Jimin performs the song as the lead vocalist of the Smeraldo Garden Marching Band. Pdogg, Ghstloop, and Evan (the song's producers) appear as the other members of the band. Filmed as a live performance against the backdrop of a woodland landscape, Jimin dances with a group of children then adult dancers whom he pairs up as couples. He joins Loco while the rapper performs his verses then participates in a choreographed sequence with the dancers. Jimin and Loco dance together briefly at the end then bow as the clip closes out.	
"Who"	2024	None		Jimin wanders through the streets at night searching for his love while singing about missing someone he has never met before and dances with a troupe of dancers.	

- Jimin also appeared in the short film Lie released in September 2016 in promotion of BTS' fourth studio album Wings.

== See also ==
- BTS albums discography
- BTS singles discography
