= List of awards and nominations received by Jimin =

Jimin awards and nominations
- Jimin in 2018
Awards and nominations
Award	Wins	Nominations
American Music Awards	0	1
APAN Star Awards	0	1
Asia Artist Awards	1	2
Asian Pop Music Awards	1	3
Billboard Music Awards	0	6
BMI Pop Awards	2	2
BreakTudo Awards	4	4
Circle Chart Music Awards	0	1
The Fact Music Awards	1	4
Golden Disc Awards	0	2
Hanteo Music Awards	4	6
iHeartRadio Music Awards	2	5
Jupiter Music Awards	1	1
Korea Grand Music Awards	1	1
MAMA Awards	3	15
Melon Music Awards	0	3
MTV Europe Music Awards	1	1
MTV Video Music Awards	0	1
SEC Awards	2	2
Seoul Music Awards	2	7

Totals (Note: Certain award groups do not simply award one winner. They acknowledge several different recipients, have runners-up, and have third place. Since this is a specific recognition and is different from losing an award, runner-up mentions are considered wins in this award tally. For simplification and to avoid errors, each award in this list has been presumed to have had a prior nomination.)
- Wins: 25
- Nominations: 69

The South Korean singer Jimin has received numerous industry awards and honorary accolades. His initial success came with the boy group BTS, which has won seven Korean Music Awards and been nominated for four Grammy Awards. In 2023, he made his solo debut with his first studio album Face, which helped him won one MAMA Award and Seoul Music Award, alongside multiple nominations from Billboard Music Awards, Golden Disk Awards and Melon Music Awards. "Who", the title track from his second studio album Muse (2024), received multiple accolades, including an MTV Europe Music Award for Best K-Pop and an iHeartRadio Music Award for K-Pop Song of the Year. It also helped him receiving the MAMA Award for Fans' Choice of the Year, making him the first solo act to win the award.

== Awards and nominations ==
Name of the award ceremony, year presented, category, nominee(s) of the award, and the result of the nomination
Award ceremony	Year	Category	Nominee(s)/work(s)	Result	Ref.
American Music Awards	2025	Favorite K-Pop Artist	Jimin	Nominated	
APAN Star Awards	2022	Best Original Soundtrack	"With You" (with Ha Sung-woon)	Nominated	
Asia Artist Awards	2024	Best Musician Solo	Jimin	Won	
Asia Artist Awards	2026	Popularity Award – Solo (Male)	Jimin	Pending	
Asian Pop Music Awards (Note: Hosted by the Hong Kong Asia Pacific International Group and Sunway Records, the Asian Pop Music Awards bases its winners on the "Asian Pop Music Chart" which opened in September 2019.)	2023	Top 20 Albums of the Year (Overseas)	Face	Won	
Asian Pop Music Awards	2023	Best Collaboration (Overseas)	"Vibe" (with Taeyang)	Nominated	
Asian Pop Music Awards	2023	Best Male Artist (Overseas)	Jimin	Nominated	
Billboard Music Awards	2023	Top Global K-Pop Artist	Jimin	Nominated	
Billboard Music Awards	2023	Top Global K-Pop Song	"Like Crazy"	Nominated	
Billboard Music Awards	2023	Top K-Pop Album	Face	Nominated	
Billboard Music Awards	2023	Top Selling Song	"Like Crazy"	Nominated	
Billboard Music Awards	2024	Top Global K-Pop Artist	Jimin	Nominated	
Billboard Music Awards	2024	Top Global K-Pop Song	"Who"	Nominated	
BMI Pop Awards	2024	Most Performed Songs of the Year	"Like Crazy"	Won	
BMI Pop Awards	2025	Most Performed Songs of the Year	"Who"	Won	
BreakTudo Awards	2023	International Hit	"Like Crazy"	Won	
BreakTudo Awards	2024	Rising International Artist	Jimin	Won	
BreakTudo Awards	2024	International Hit of the Year	"Who"	Won	
BreakTudo Awards	2025	International Male Artist	Jimin	Won	
Circle Chart Music Awards	2024	Artist of the Year – Global Streaming	"Like Crazy"	Nominated	
The Fact Music Awards	2023	Best Music (Spring)	"Like Crazy"	Nominated	
The Fact Music Awards	2023	Best Music (Spring)	"Vibe" (with Taeyang)	Nominated	
The Fact Music Awards	2023	Fan N Star Choice Award – Individual	Jimin	Nominated	
The Fact Music Awards	2023	Idolplus Popularity Award	Jimin	Won	
Golden Disc Awards	2024	Best Digital Song (Bonsang)	"Like Crazy"	Nominated	
Golden Disc Awards	2024	Best Digital Song (Bonsang)	"Vibe" (with Taeyang)	Nominated	
Hanteo Music Awards	2024	Artist of the Year(Bonsang)	Jimin	Won	
Hanteo Music Awards	2024	Global Artist Award – Oceania	Jimin	Won	
Hanteo Music Awards	2024	Global Artist Award – South America	Jimin	Won	
Hanteo Music Awards	2024	Global Artist Award – Africa	Jimin	Nominated	
Hanteo Music Awards	2024	Global Artist Award – Europe	Jimin	Nominated	
Hanteo Music Awards	2024	Global Artist Award – North America	Jimin	Nominated	
Hanteo Music Awards	2025	Global Artist – Europe	Jimin	Won	
iHeartRadio Music Awards	2025	Kpop Song of the Year	"Who"	Won	
iHeartRadio Music Awards	2025	Kpop Artist of the Year	Jimin	Nominated	
iHeartRadio Music Awards	2025	Best Lyrics	"Who"	Nominated	
iHeartRadio Music Awards	2025	Favorite On Screen	Are you Sure?! (Jimin & Jungkook)	Nominated	
iHeartRadio Music Awards	2026	Favorite On Screen	Are you Sure?! (Jimin & Jungkook)	Won	
Jupiter Music Awards	2025	Song of the Year	"Who"	Won	
Korea Grand Music Awards	2025	Fan Vote Artist – Male	Jimin	Won	
MAMA Awards	2022	Best OST	"With You" (with Ha Sung-woon)	Nominated	
MAMA Awards	2022	Song of the Year	"With You" (with Ha Sung-woon)	Nominated	
MAMA Awards	2023	Best Male Artist	Jimin	Won	
MAMA Awards	2023	Album of the Year	Face	Longlisted	
MAMA Awards	2023	Artist of the Year	Jimin	Longlisted	
MAMA Awards	2023	Best Collaboration	"Vibe" (with Taeyang)	Nominated	
MAMA Awards	2023	Best Dance Performance – Male Solo	"Like Crazy"	Nominated	
MAMA Awards	2023	Best Dance Performance – Male Solo	"Vibe" (with Taeyang)	Nominated	
MAMA Awards	2023	Song of the Year	"Like Crazy"	Longlisted	
MAMA Awards	2023	Song of the Year	"Vibe" (with Taeyang)	Longlisted	
MAMA Awards	2024				
MAMA Awards	2024	Fan's Choice of the Year (Daesang)	Jimin	Won	
MAMA Awards	2024	Fan's Choice – Male	Jimin	Won	
MAMA Awards	2024	Artist of the Year	Jimin	Nominated	
MAMA Awards	2024	Best Male Artist	Jimin	Nominated	
MAMA Awards	2024	Best Dance Performance Male Solo	"Who"	Nominated	
Melon Music Awards	2023	Album of the Year	Face	Longlisted	
Melon Music Awards	2023	Millions Top 10	Face	Nominated	
Melon Music Awards	2023	Top 10 Artist Award	Jimin	Nominated	
MTV Europe Music Awards	2024	Best K-Pop	Jimin	Won	
MTV Video Music Awards	2025	Best K-Pop	"Who"	Nominated	
SEC Awards (Note: The SEC Awards, formerly known as the Séries em Cena Awards, is a Brazilian award show that honors achievements in music, film, television, and internet culture in Brazil and globally.)	2023	International Album of the Year	Face	Won	
SEC Awards	2025	International Album of the Year	Muse	Won	
Seoul Music Awards	2023	OST Award	"With You" (with Ha Sung-woon)	Nominated	
Seoul Music Awards	2024	Main Award (Bonsang)	Jimin	Won	
Seoul Music Awards	2024	Grand Award (Daesang)	Jimin	Nominated	
Seoul Music Awards	2024	Fan Choice of the Year – April	Jimin	Nominated	
Seoul Music Awards	2024	Hallyu Special Award	Jimin	Nominated	
Seoul Music Awards	2024	Popularity Award	Jimin	Nominated	
Seoul Music Awards	2025	K-Wave Special Award	Jimin	Won	

== Other accolades ==
=== Listicles ===
Name of publisher, year listed, name of listicle, and placement
Publisher	Year	Listicle	Placement	Ref.
Billboard	2024	K-Pop Artist 100	21th	
Billboard	2025	K-Pop Artist 100	46th	
Forbes Korea	2024	Power Celebrity 40	7th	
Forbes Korea	2025	K-Idol of the Year 30	15th	
Forbes Korea	2026	Power Celebrity 40	12th	
Madame Tussauds	2025	Hot 100	Included	

=== World records ===
Name of publication, year the record was awarded, name of the record, and the name of the record holder
Publication	Year	World record	Record Holder	Ref.
Guinness World Records	2023	Fastest solo K-pop artist to reach 1 billion streams on Spotify (male) (Note: 393 days)	Jimin	
Guinness World Records	2023	Most streamed track on SoundCloud (Note: 330 million plays)	"Promise"	
Guinness World Records	2023	Most streamed track on SoundCloud in 24 hours	"Promise"	

== See also ==
- List of awards and nominations received by BTS
