= List of Billboard Digital Song Sales number ones of 2023 =

2023 highest-selling digital singles in the United States

The Billboard Digital Song Sales chart is a chart that ranks the most downloaded songs in the United States. Its data is compiled by Nielsen SoundScan based on each song's weekly digital sales, which combines sales of different versions of a song by an act for a summarized figure.

== Chart history ==
Key
†	Indicates best-performing song of 2023

Issue date	Song	Artist(s)	Weekly sales	Ref(s)
January 7	"Ghost"	Tom MacDonald	11,000	
January 14	"Anti-Hero" †	Taylor Swift	6,000	
January 21	"Anti-Hero" †	Taylor Swift	7,000	
January 28	"Flowers"	Miley Cyrus	70,000	
February 4	"Flowers"	Miley Cyrus	65,000	
February 11	"Flowers"	Miley Cyrus	37,000	
February 18	"Cuff It"	Beyoncé	78,000	
February 25	"Flowers"	Miley Cyrus	22,000	
March 4	"Flowers"	Miley Cyrus	18,000	
March 11	"Last Night"	Morgan Wallen	18,000	
March 18	"Red Ruby da Sleeze"	Nicki Minaj		
March 25	"Justice for All"	Donald Trump and the J6 Prison Choir	33,000	
April 1	"Set Me Free Pt. 2"	Jimin	63,000	
April 8	"Like Crazy"	Jimin		
April 15	"Like Crazy"	Jimin	14,800	
April 22	"People Pt. 2"	Agust D featuring IU	18,000	
April 29	"Princess Diana"	Ice Spice and Nicki Minaj	77,000	
May 6	"Haegeum"	Agust D	23,000	
May 13	"If You Could Read My Mind"	Gordon Lightfoot	10,000	
May 20	"Eyes Closed"	Ed Sheeran		
May 27	"Life Goes On"	Ed Sheeran featuring Luke Combs		
June 3	"Angel Pt. 1"	Kodak Black and NLE Choppa featuring Jimin, Jvke and Muni Long		
June 10	"Hits Different"	Taylor Swift		
June 17	"Pound Town 2"	Sexyy Red featuring Nicki Minaj and Tay Keith		
June 24	"Take Two"	BTS		
July 1	"Fast Car"	Luke Combs	10,000	
July 8	"Barbie World"	Nicki Minaj, Ice Spice and Aqua	37,000	
July 15	"Fast Car"	Luke Combs		
July 22	"Fast Car"	Luke Combs	11,000	
July 29	"Try That in a Small Town"	Jason Aldean	228,000	
August 5	"Try That in a Small Town"	Jason Aldean	175,000	
August 12	"Try That in a Small Town"	Jason Aldean	26,000	
August 19	"Try That in a Small Town"	Jason Aldean		
August 26	"Rich Men North of Richmond"	Oliver Anthony Music	147,000	
September 2	"Rich Men North of Richmond"	Oliver Anthony Music	117,000	
September 9	"Rich Men North of Richmond"	Oliver Anthony Music	34,000	
September 16	"Margaritaville"	Jimmy Buffett	16,000	
September 23	"Bongos"	Cardi B featuring Megan Thee Stallion		
September 30	"Paint the Town Red"	Doja Cat	8,000	
October 7	"Paint the Town Red"	Doja Cat	6,000	
October 14	"3D"	Jung Kook featuring Jack Harlow		
October 21	"3D"	Jung Kook featuring Jack Harlow		
October 28	"Cruel Summer"	Taylor Swift	41,000	
November 4	"Too Much"	The Kid Laroi, Jung Kook and Central Cee		
November 11	"Now and Then"	The Beatles	16,000	
November 18	"Standing Next to You"	Jung Kook	84,000	
November 25	"Standing Next to You"	Jung Kook		
December 2	"Standing Next to You"	Jung Kook		
December 9	"You're Losing Me"	Taylor Swift		
December 16	"Standing Next to You"	Jung Kook		
December 23	"Lovin on Me"	Jack Harlow	8,000	
December 30	"Standing Next to You"	Jung Kook		
