= Face-Off (Jimin song) =

2023 song by Jimin

Song by Jimin

from the album Face
- Language: Korean
- Released: March 24, 2023
- Length: 3:49
- Label: Big Hit
- Songwriters: Pdogg; Ghstloop; Jimin; Evan; RM
- Producers: Pdogg; Ghstloop

"Face-off" is a song recorded by South Korean singer Jimin of BTS for his debut solo album Face. It was released on March 24, 2023, by Big Hit Music.

== Charts ==
Weekly chart performance for "Face-off"
Chart (2023)	Peak position
Japan Digital Singles (Oricon)	34
New Zealand Hot Singles (RMNZ)	25
South Korea (Circle)	64
US Digital Song Sales (Billboard)	8
US World Digital Song Sales (Billboard)	4
