= Alone (Jimin song) =

2023 song by Jimin

Song by Jimin

from the album Face
- Language: Korean
- Released: March 24, 2023
- Length: 3:31
- Label: Big Hit
- Songwriters: Pdogg; Jimin; Ghstloop; Evan
- Producer: Pdogg

"Alone" is a song recorded by the South Korean singer Jimin of BTS for his first solo album, Face. It was released on March 24, 2023, by Big Hit Music.

== Charts ==
Weekly chart performance for "Alone"
Chart (2023)	Peak position
Japan Digital Singles (Oricon)	37
New Zealand Hot Singles (RMNZ)	33
South Korea (Circle)	112
US Digital Song Sales (Billboard)	12
US World Digital Song Sales (Billboard)	5
