= Closer Than This =

Single by Jimin
- Language: Korean
- Released: December 22, 2023
- Label: Big Hit
- Songwriters: August Rigo; Jimin; Ayo the Producer; Evan; Ghstloop; Pdogg; Kofo; Shankz
- Producers: Ghstloop; Ayo the Producer; Kofo

Jimin singles chronology
"Angel Pt. 2" (2023)	"Closer Than This" (2023)	"Smeraldo Garden Marching Band" (2024)

Music video
- "Closer Than This" on YouTube

"Closer Than This" is a song recorded by South Korean singer Jimin of BTS, released as a digital single on December 22, 2023, through Big Hit Music. An accompanying music video comprises behind-the-scenes footage of Jimin during the song's writing and recording process, and clips of BTS with their fans at various fan meeting and concert events throughout the band's career. The song was later included on his second studio album Muse (2024).

== Charts ==
=== Weekly charts ===
Weekly chart performance
Chart (2023)	Peak position
Global 200 (Billboard)	55
Japan Hot 100 (Billboard)	84
Japan Digital Singles (Oricon)	2
New Zealand Hot Singles (RMNZ)	3
Singapore Regional (RIAS)	17
South Korea (Circle)	42
UK Singles Downloads (OCC)	3
UK Singles Sales (OCC)	5
US Bubbling Under Hot 100 (Billboard)	4
US Digital Song Sales (Billboard)	1
US World Digital Song Sales (Billboard)	1

=== Monthly charts ===
Monthly chart performance
Chart (2023)	Position
South Korea (Circle)	170
