= Fast X (soundtrack) =

Soundtrack to the 2023 film Fast X

Fast X (Original Motion Picture Soundtrack)

Soundtrack album by various artists
- Released: May 19, 2023
- Genres: Hip-hop; pop; reggaeton; Latin pop; EDM; trap
- Length: 49:40
- Label: APG
- Producers: Mark Nilan Jr.; Internet Money; Dkeyz; DrumDummie; Johnny Goldstein; Danny Majic; Cirkut; Jussifer; Rio Leyva; Beau Willie; Mark Anthony; P-Lo; Charley Cooks; Enrgy; Wzrd Bld; Kordhell; Budd Dwyer; Joyryde; Lexuz; DJ Luian; Mambo Kingz; DallasK; Josh Berrios; Luny Tunes; Skrillex; King Doudou; Soulker; Chase The Money; Daveo; Squat; Go Grizz

Singles from Fast X (Original Motion Picture Soundtrack)
- 1. "Let's Ride" Released: February 10, 2023; 2. "Gasolina (Safari Riot Remix)" Released: April 19, 2023; 3. "Won't Back Down" Released: May 4, 2023; 4. "Toretto" Released: May 12, 2023; 5. "Angel Pt. 1" Released: May 18, 2023

Fast X (Original Motion Picture Soundtrack) is the soundtrack to the 2023 film Fast X. The soundtrack was released by the independent record label Artist Partner Group on the same day as the film's release, May 19, 2023, and featured 21 tracks consisting an array of genres and artists. The album was preceded by five singles: "Let's Ride", "Gasolina", "Won't Back Down", "Toretto" and "Angel Pt. 1".

== Background and release ==
The first single "Let's Ride" was released on February 10, 2023. The single is performed by YG, Ty Dolla Sign and Lambo4oe. It was dubbed as the "trailer anthem" as the music sampled "Notorious Thugs" by the Notorious B.I.G. and Bone Thugs-n-Harmony from the former's album Life After Death (1997), whose orchestral version was featured in the trailer. The song also featured an extended three-minute version and a drift phonk cover by SXMPRA. A "Safari Riot" remix of Daddy Yankee's 2004 hit single "Gasolina" by Myke Towers (also featured in the film's second trailer) was released on April 19, as the album's second single.

"Won't Back Down" performed by YoungBoy Never Broke Again, Bailey Zimmerman and Dermot Kennedy was released as the third single from the album on May 4, 2023. "Toretto" performed by J Balvin was released as the fourth single on May 12, accompanied by a music video featuring Vin Diesel. Jimin, JVKE and Muni Long performed the fifth single "Angel Pt. 1" with Kodak Black and NLE Choppa, released on May 18, 2023, a day before the film's release.

The track list was released on May 13, 2023, featuring contributions from Kai Cenat, Lil Durk, EST Gee, G Herbo, 24kGoldn, Kane Brown amongst several others. The soundtrack was released on May 19, 2023 by Artist Partner Group being the first soundtrack from the Fast & Furious franchise since Fast & Furious 6 (2013), not to be distributed by Atlantic Records which published all of the franchise's soundtracks since Furious 7 (2015).

== Track listing ==
Fast X: Original Motion Picture Soundtrack track listing
No.	Title	Writer(s)	Producer(s)	Length
1.	"The End of the Road Begins (Intro)" (Kai Cenat)	Cenat; Mark Nilan Jr.	Nilan Jr.	0:37
2.	"Spinnin'" (Lil Durk featuring EST Gee)	Cristian Dejesus Tejada; Danny Snodgrass Jr.; Demario Driver; Durk Banks; Elias Iatrou; George Albert Stone; Ryder Johnson; Tobias Fagerström; Turrell Sims	Internet Money	2:47
3.	"Get It" (Anti Da Menace and Luh Tyler)	David Cabral; Linderius Johnson; Nilan Jr.; Tevin Revell; Tyler Meeks	Nilan Jr.; Dkeyz; DrumDummie	1:43
4.	"Won't Back Down" (YoungBoy Never Broke Again, Dermot Kennedy and Bailey Zimmerman)	Connor McDonough; Jakke Erixson; Kentrell DeSean Gaulden; Riley McDonough; Johnny Goldstein	Goldstein	2:42
5.	"Angel Pt. 1" (Kodak Black and NLE Choppa featuring Jimin, JVKE and Muni Long)	Bill Kapri; Bryson Potts; Danny Majic; Jackson Foote; James Abrahart; Jaucquez Lowe; Jeremy Dussolliet; Johnny Simpson; Nilan Jr.; Tylon Freeman	Majic; Nilan Jr.	2:55
6.	"My City" (24kGoldn and Kane Brown featuring G Herbo)	Michael Pollack; Corbyn Besson; Daniel Seavey; Golden Landis von Jones; Henry Walter; Herbert Randall Wright III; Jacob Torrey; Jonah Marais; Jonny Capeci; Jussi Karvinen; Brown	Cirkut; Jussifer	2:29
7.	"Countin' On You" (Lil Tjay, Fridayy and Khi Infinite)	Majic; Francis Leblanc; Rio Leyva; Tione Merritt; Zakhi Jermaine Lamb-McCray	Leyva; Majic	2:28
8.	"Supafly" (Cootie, BiC Fizzle and BigXthaPlug)	Curtis Mayfield; Jeremiah Northern; Randarius Caruthers; Ryan Austin; Xavier Landum	Beau Willie	2:58
9.	"Reaper" (BabyTron, Babyface Ray and Peezy)	Charles Forsberg III; James Johnson IV; Marcellus Rayvon Register; Mark Anthony Masters Jr.; Paulo Rodriguez; Philip Glen-Earl Peaks	Mark Anthony; P-Lo; Charley Cooks	2:48
10.	"Steppers" (NLE Choppa and Nardo Wick)	Potts; Majic; Drew Fulk; Horace Bernard Walls III; Lowe; Marlon Lafayette Brown Jr.	Majic; Enrgy; Wzrd Bld	2:44
11.	"9 In My Hand (Fast X Remix)" (Kordhell and Key Glock)	Kordhell; Markeyvius Cathey	Kordhell	1:57
12.	"Datura" (Suicideboys)	Aristos Petrou; Scott Arceneaux Jr.	Budd Dwyer	1:36
13.	"Furious" (BIA)	Bianca Landrau; John William Albert Ford	Joyryde	0:43
14.	"Toretto" (J Balvin)	DJ Luian; Andy Bauza; Edgar Semper; Joseph Negron Velez; Joshua Omar Medina; José Álvaro Osorio Balvín; Lenin Yorney Palacios Machado; Luian Malavé; Luis A. O'Neill; Pablo C Fuentes; Xavier Semper	Lexuz; Luian; Mambo Kingz	2:30
15.	"Te Cura" (María Becerra)	Carolina Isabel Colón Juarbe; Dallas Koehlke; Josh Berrios; Kat Dahlia; Becerra; Xavier Rosero	DallasK; Berrios	2:30
16.	"Sigue La Fiesta" (Justin Quiles, Dalex and Santa Fe Klan)	Jair Quezada Jasso; Jakke Erixson; Quiles; Pedro David Daleccio; Simon Restrepo; Goldstein	Goldstein	3:02
17.	"Gasolina (Safari Riot Remix)" (Daddy Yankee featuring Myke Towers)	Eddie Avila; Michael Torres; Ramón Luis Ayala Rodríguez	Luny Tunes	2:32
18.	"Vai Sentando" (Skrillex featuring Ludmilla, King Doudou and Duki)	Hugo Passaquin; Ludmila Oliveira da Silva; Mauro Ezequiel Lombardo; Mohamed Echchatibi; Skrillex	Skrillex; Doudou	2:14
19.	"Bando (Fast X Remix)" (Anna featuring MadMan and Gemitaiz)	Anna Pepe; Davide de Luca; Martin Purcell; Pierfrancesco Botrugno	Soulker	2:48
20.	"Let's Ride (Trailer Anthem)" (YG and The Notorious B.I.G. featuring Lambo4oe, Ty Dolla Sign and Bone Thugs-n-Harmony)	Anthony Henderson; Bryon McCane; Chase Rose; Christopher Wallace; Majic; Dave Grear; James Wrighter; John Miller; Julius Rivera III; Keenon Daequan Ray Jackson; Kevin Andre Price; Sean Combs; Steven Howse; Steve Jordan; Tyrone William Griffin Jr.	ChaseTheMoney; Daveo; Squat; Go Grizz; Majic	2:27
21.	"Nothing Else Matters" (Jessie Murph)	Cate Downey; Nilan Jr.	Nilan Jr.	3:10
Total length:				49:40

=== Japanese CD edition bonus track ===
No.	Title	Writer(s)	Length
15.	"Crazy (Safari Riot Remix)" (Doechii, remix by Safari Riot)	Jaylah Hickmon; Kai Banx	2:39

== Additional music ==
Songs heard in the film but not on the soundtrack includes:

- "Good Vibrations" by Marky Mark and the Funky Bunch featuring Loleatta Holloway
- "Passin' Me By" by The Pharcyde
- "In nome del padre" by Måneskin
- "Give It Up" by Public Enemy
- "In This Situation" by Mealticket
- "'O Sole mio" by Giovanni Capurro
- "Happy Trails" by Roy Rogers and Dale Evans
- "Lotería" by Tre Wright, Jay Ham and 3van

== Charts ==
Chart performance for Fast X soundtrack
Chart (2023)	Peak position
Belgian Albums (Ultratop Flanders)	135
Canadian Albums (Billboard)	68
French Albums (SNEP)	149
Japanese Albums (Oricon)	15
Japanese Combined Albums (Oricon)	15
Japanese Hot Albums (Billboard Japan)	13
Spanish Albums (Promusicae)	41
UK Compilation Albums (Official Charts)	12
UK R&B Albums (Official Charts)	10
US Billboard 200	79
US Soundtrack Albums (Billboard)	1

== Fast X (Original Motion Picture Score) ==
Fast X (Original Motion Picture Score)

Film score by Brian Tyler
- Released: June 2, 2023
- Length: 103:47
- Label: Back Lot Music
- Producer: Brian Tyler

Brian Tyler chronology
The Super Mario Bros. Movie (2023)	Fast X (Original Motion Picture Score) (2023)	Abigail (2024)

Fast X (Original Motion Picture Score) is the film score album, featuring the original music composed by Brian Tyler, who called it as his "most complex" score in the franchise. As he described the antagonist Dante Reyes (Jason Momoa) as "relatable" and "charming", for his theme, he used high strings such as the harp, and bass music with modern instruments as "it gives you this feeling that you can't look away. There's a sense [in his music] of empathizing with him, and why he becomes this villain." He also used an odd chord, describing it as "every time it happens and cycles around, that chord goes inside your brain to understand where the music is supposed to go. It's like a dopamine hit, that's different and reminds you there's something off about him." The score was released by Back Lot Music on June 2, 2023.

=== Track listing ===
No.	Title	Length
1.	"Fast X"	2:30
2.	"Dante's Inferno"	3:39
3.	"Veloce e Forte"	4:23
4.	"Momentum"	4:57
5.	"Scales of Power"	2:59
6.	"Origin Story"	6:03
7.	"Move"	2:49
8.	"Nobody's Rome"	2:13
9.	"Piquete"	1:12
10.	"Jakob's Ladder"	3:54
11.	"Under New Management"	4:32
12.	"Letty and Dom"	1:40
13.	"Black Site"	2:10
14.	"Slap Party"	3:22
15.	"Hermana"	2:11
16.	"Legacy"	4:40
17.	"Showtime"	1:46
18.	"The Lens of Time"	1:00
19.	"Aviation Schism"	3:26
20.	"While Rome Burns"	2:05
21.	"How Do You Choose?"	2:35
22.	"Visions of the Past" (includes "See You Again" (Instrumental))	2:55
23.	"Back to Swan Lake" (containing "Swan Lake", composed by Pyotr Ilyich Tchaikovsky)	4:37
24.	"Million Dollar Woman"	2:46
25.	"Roman's Riches"	1:43
26.	"One If By Plane"	2:19
27.	"Follow the Litres"	1:52
28.	"Family Values"	2:23
29.	"Rebalance of Power"	2:50
30.	"Viaduct Dodge"	2:37
31.	"Home Invasion"	2:02
32.	"Standoff"	2:53
33.	"Won't Back Down (Orchestral Version)"	3:33
34.	"The Final Lesson"	3:42
35.	"Finale X"	3:29
Total length:		103:47
