= Serendipity (BTS song) =

Song by BTS

Song by BTS

from the EP Love Yourself: Her and the album Love Yourself: Answer
- Released: August 24, 2018
- Recorded: 2017–2018
- Studio: Carrot Express; Adorable Trap; Big Hit Studio
- Genre: Alternative R&B; R&B
- Length: 2:19; 4:37 (Full length edition)
- Label: Big Hit
- Songwriters: Slow Rabbit; Ray Michael Djan Jr.; Ashton Foster; RM; "hitman" bang
- Producer: Slow Rabbit

Music video
- "'Serendipity' Comeback Trailer" on YouTube

"Serendipity" is a song by South Korean boy band BTS, sung as a solo by member Jimin. It was originally released digitally as an introductory song on September 8, 2017 in the extended play Love Yourself: Her, with the full length edition of the song being released on August 24, 2018 in Love Yourself: Answer. It was written by "hitman" bang, Ashton Foster, Ray Michael Djan Jr., RM, and Slow Rabbit, who was also credited as the producer.

== Background and release ==
According to writer Ray Michael Djan Jr., "Serendipity" started out as a deep, meaningful paragraph. The producers concentrated on making a strong melody for the song as usually the lyrics are changed from English to Korean.

When the trailer was released both "Jimin" and "Serendipity" trended worldwide. In a V Live broadcast, RM revealed Jimin's goal with the song was to "push himself as a vocalist" resulting in him coming to RM for advice. RM also showed a snippet of his version. When the music video was released it garnered over seven million views and one million likes in twenty-four hours.

== Promotion ==
The music video was released as a teaser for the upcoming EP Love Yourself: Her. The song was promoted at the 2018 KBS Song Festival in December 2018.

== Music video ==
The music video was directed by Choi Yongseok and Lee Wonju of Lumpens, with the choreography for the song created by Brian Puspos, who had worked with BTS before on "Butterfly".

== Composition ==
Musically, the song has been described as sensual and soothing, with hints of delicate electronic-tinged R&B in it. The genre was termed Alternative R&B by Billboard, with the intro version running 2:20 and the full version being 4:36. It is in the key of A♭ major and is eighty-seven beats per minute. With gender neutral lyrics it talked about following your dreams, love, identity, and purpose.

== Reception ==
"Serendipity" received critical acclaim, with IZM stating "'Serendipity' has a dreamlike quality to it, unraveling the joy, conviction, and curiosity of love". Chester Chin from star2 stated the song was a "soft and sensual ballad [and] an exquisite display of the group's maturity". The intro version of the song sold 114,128 digital copies in South Korea, with the full length version peaking at number twenty-nine for digital sales in the United States and selling more than 10,000 copies. In Canada, the full length version was the thirty-ninth best selling song upon release and was the eighth best seller worldwide.

== Credits and personnel ==
Adapted from the liner notes of Love Yourself: Answer.

- Slow Rabbit – production, keyboard, synthesizer, vocal arrangement, record engineering (@ Carrot Express)
- Ray Michael Djan Jr – production
- Ashton Foster – production
- RM – production
- "hitman" bang – production
- Pdogg – additional programming
- JUNE – chorus
- ADORA – chorus, record engineering (@ Adorable Trap)
- Kim Seunghyeon – guitar
- Jeong Wooyeong – recording engineering (@ Big Hit Studio)
- Yang Ga – mix engineering (@ Big Hit Studio)

== Charts ==
Chart performance for "Intro: Serendipity"
Chart (2017)	Peak position
New Zealand Heatseekers (RMNZ)	8
South Korea (Gaon)	18
South Korea (K-pop Hot 100)	7
US World Digital Song Sales (Billboard)	2

Chart performance for "Serendipity" (Full length edition)
Chart (2018)	Peak position
Canadian Hot Digital Song Sales (Billboard)	39
French Downloaded Singles (SNEP)	93
Hungary (Single Top 40)	19
South Korea (Gaon)	77
South Korea (K-pop Hot 100)	9
Scottish Singles Sales (Official Charts)	78
UK Downloads (OCC)	64
US Digital Song Sales (Billboard)	29
US World Digital Song Sales (Billboard)	5

== Release history ==
Version	Country	Date	Format	Label
Intro version	Various	September 18, 2017	digital download; streaming	Big Hit
Full length version	Various	August 24, 2018	digital download; streaming	Big Hit
