= Who (song) =

Single by Jimin

from the album Muse
- Released: July 19, 2024
- Genre: Dance-pop; R&B; hip hop
- Length: 2:50
- Label: Big Hit
- Songwriters: Ghstloop; Tenroc; Pdogg; Jon Bellion; Pete Nappi
- Producers: Ghstloop; Jon Bellion; Pete Nappi; Tenroc; Pdogg

Jimin singles chronology
"Smeraldo Garden Marching Band" (2024)	"Who" (2024)

Music video
- "Who" on YouTube

"Who" is a song by South Korean singer Jimin of BTS. It was released on July 19, 2024, as the lead single from his second studio album, Muse, through Big Hit Music.

== Background and promotion ==
On July 18, 2024, the song was revealed to be the focus track from his second studio album, Muse, with an impending performance being teased the same day. On July 22, a pre-recorded performance of the song was broadcast on The Tonight Show Starring Jimmy Fallon, which was recorded before his enlistment in December 2023. The video shows Jimin "flanked by dancers" performing in an abandoned warehouse in front of a neon sign that says "Who".

== Commercial performance ==
A few days after release, "Who" experienced an increased in activity on streaming platforms, and eventually reached number one on Spotify's daily global charts. It debuted at number four on the UK Singles Chart, becoming Jimin's highest-charting solo single in the United Kingdom. In January 2025, the song returned to the top five of the chart, marking Jimin's first single to spend at least two weeks in the top ten.

In the United States, "Who" debuted at number 14 on the Billboard Hot 100 (issue dated August 3, 2024), marking Jimin's sixth entry on the chart as a solo artist and the second-highest debut of his career; previously "Like Crazy" debuted at number one in 2023. It was both the highest-charting new entry and the best-selling song of its release week, additionally topping the corresponding issue of the component Digital Song Sales chart and earning Jimin a record sixth number-one on the ranking, the most among K-pop solo artists and the second-most among all K-pop acts behind only BTS. In its second week on the Hot 100 (issue dated August 10), "Who" peaked at number 12. It went on to spend 33 non-consecutive weeks on the chart, making it the longest-charting song by a K-pop act at the time.

"Who" accumulated 90.5 million streams and 129,000 sales worldwide during its release week (tracking period dated July 19–25, 2024), earning a number one debut on the August 3 issue of the Billboard Global 200. The song concurrently topped the Global Excl. US chart with 76 million streams and 76,000 sales in territories outside of the US. It is Jimin's first to debut atop both global rankings, and he is the second member of BTS to achieve this as a solo artist. "Who" spent a second consecutive week at number one on both global charts (issues dated August 10), with a further 93.4 million streams and 64,000 sales worldwide and 75 million streams and 15,000 sales earned in non-US territories (tracking period dated July 26–August 1).

== Music video ==
Jimin wanders through the streets at night searching for his "love" while singing about missing someone he has never met before and dances with a troupe of dancers.

== Accolades ==
"Who" won three non-consecutive Melon Weekly Popularity awards for the weeks ending July 29, and August 5 and 19, 2024. The song also earned two first-place trophies on the August 8 and 15 episodes of M Countdown.

Awards & Nominations for "Who"
Award ceremony	Year	Category	Result	Ref.
Billboard Music Awards	2024	Top Global K-Pop Song	Nominated	
BMI Pop Awards	2025	Most Performed Song of The Year	Won	
BreakTudo Awards	2024	International Hit of the Year	Won	
iHeartRadio Music Awards	2025	Kpop Song of the Year	Won	
iHeartRadio Music Awards	2025	Best Lyrics	Nominated	
Jupiter Music Awards	2025	Song of the Year	Won	
MAMA Awards	2024	Best Dance Performance Male Solo	Nominated	
MTV Video Music Awards	2025	Best K-Pop	Nominated	

== Track listing ==
- CD and digital single
1. "Who" – 2:50
- Digital – Remixes EP
1. "Who" – 2:50
2. "Who" (Instrumental) – 2:50
3. "Who" (Acoustic Remix) – 3:04
4. "Who" (Rock Remix) – 2:51
5. "Who" (Shibuyakei Remix) – 2:46
6. "Who" (Funky remix) – 3:08
7. "Who" (Beautiful Mind Remix) – 2:57

== Credits and personnel ==
Credits adapted from Melon.

=== Studio ===
- Dogg Bounce – recording
- Cove City Sound Studios – recording
- MixStar Studios – mixing

=== Personnel ===
- Jon Bellion – producer, lyrics, composition, keyboards, synthesizer, drum programming, background vocals
- Pete Nappi – producer, lyrics, composition, keyboards, synthesizer, drum programming
- Tenroc (Jason Cornet) – producer, lyrics, composition, keyboards, synthesizer, guitar, drum programming
- Pdogg – producer, lyrics, composition, keyboards, synthesizer, vocal arrangement, recording, digital editing
- Ghstloop – producer, lyrics, composition, keyboards, digital editing
- Noogi Park – bass
- John Arbuckle – recording
- Serban Ghenea – mixing
  - Bryce Bordone – assistant

== Charts ==
=== Weekly charts ===
Weekly chart performance
Chart (2024–2026)	Peak position
Argentina Hot 100 (Billboard)	61
Austria (Ö3 Austria Top 40)	31
Belarus Airplay (TopHit)	1
Bolivia (Billboard)	3
Brazil Hot 100 (Billboard)	25
Canada Hot 100 (Billboard)	32
CIS Airplay (TopHit)	6
Costa Rica Airplay (FONOTICA)	7
Costa Rica Streaming (FONOTICA)	2
Czech Republic Singles Digital (ČNS IFPI)	42
Ecuador (Billboard)	24
Estonia Airplay (TopHit)	17
France (SNEP)	141
Global 200 (Billboard)	1
Greece International Streaming (IFPI)	49
Hong Kong (Billboard)	5
Hungary (Single Top 40)	40
India International Streaming (IMI)	1
Indonesia (Billboard)	8
Ireland (IRMA)	65
Italy Airplay (EarOne)	47
Japan Hot 100 (Billboard)	21
Japan Combined Singles (Oricon)	42
Kazakhstan Airplay (TopHit)	1
Latvia Airplay (LaIPA)	19
Latvia Streaming (LaIPA)	1
Lebanon (Lebanese Top 20)	6
Lithuania (AGATA)	51
Malaysia (Billboard)	2
Malaysia International Streaming (RIM)	2
Middle East and North Africa (IFPI)	1
Moldova Airplay (TopHit)	193
Netherlands (Global Top 40)	1
New Zealand Hot Singles (RMNZ)	2
Nigeria (TurnTable Top 100)	71
North Africa (IFPI)	7
Panama International (PRODUCE)	48
Peru (Billboard)	3
Philippines (Philippines Hot 100)	10
Poland (Polish Streaming Top 100)	93
Portugal (AFP)	65
Russia Airplay (TopHit)	2
Russia Streaming (TopHit) (Note: The Russian Streaming chart was launched in late March 2025. Therefore, "Who" did not have a full run on the chart.)	79
San Marino Airplay (SMRTV Top 50)	44
Saudi Arabia Streaming (IFPI)	4
Singapore (RIAS)	1
Slovakia Airplay (ČNS IFPI)	45
South Korea (Circle)	33
Switzerland (Schweizer Hitparade)	30
Taiwan (Billboard)	11
Ukraine Airplay (TopHit)	107
United Arab Emirates (IFPI)	6
UK Singles (Official Charts)	4
US Billboard Hot 100	12
US Pop Airplay (Billboard)	26
Vietnam (Vietnam Hot 100)	38

=== Monthly charts ===
Monthly chart performance
Chart (2024–2025)	Peak position
Belarus Airplay (TopHit)	1
CIS Airplay (TopHit)	6
Czech Republic (Singles Digitál Top 100)	62
Estonia Airplay (TopHit)	19
Kazakhstan Airplay (TopHit)	4
Latvia Airplay (TopHit)	23
Lithuania Airplay (TopHit)	77
Russia Airplay (TopHit)	9
Russia Streaming (TopHit)	70
South Korea (Circle)	83

=== Year-end charts ===
Year-end chart performance
Chart (2024)	Position
Belarus Airplay (TopHit)	36
CIS Airplay (TopHit)	42
Estonia Airplay (TopHit)	122
Global 200 (Billboard)	106
India International Streaming (IMI)	14
Kazakhstan Airplay (TopHit)	39
Philippines (Philippines Hot 100)	84
Russia Airplay (TopHit)	23

Year-end chart performance
Chart (2025)	Position
Belarus Airplay (TopHit)	6
CIS Airplay (TopHit)	120
Global 200 (Billboard)	21
Japan (Japan Hot 100)	73
Kazakhstan Airplay (TopHit)	36
Philippines (Philippines Hot 100)	63
Russia Airplay (TopHit)	108
US Billboard Hot 100	57

=== Decade-end charts ===
20s Decade-end chart performance
Chart (2025–2026)	Position
Russia Streaming (TopHit)	154

== Certifications ==
Certifications
Region	Certification	Certified units/sales
Canada (Music Canada)	Platinum	80,000^{‡}
Spain (Promusicae)	Gold	30,000^{‡}
United Kingdom (BPI)	Gold	400,000^{‡}
Streaming
Japan (RIAJ)	Platinum	100,000,000^{†}
^{‡} Sales+streaming figures based on certification alone.^{†} Streaming-only figures based on certification alone.

== Release history ==
Release dates and formats
Region	Date	Format(s)	Version	Label	Ref.
Various	July 19, 2024	Digital download; streaming	Original	Big Hit	
United States	July 19, 2024	CD single	Original	Big Hit	
Various	July 23, 2024	Digital download; streaming	Remixes	Big Hit	
Italy	July 25, 2024	Radio airplay	Original	EMI	
United States	August 13, 2024	Contemporary hit radio	Original	Big Hit	
