= With You (Jimin and Ha Sung-woon song) =

2022 single by Jimin and Ha Sung-woon

Single by Jimin and Ha Sung-woon

from the album Our Blues OST
- Language: English; Korean
- Released: April 24, 2022
- Length: 3:21
- Label: YamYam
- Composer: Rocoberry
- Lyricist: Jihoon
- Producer: Song Dong-woon

Jimin singles chronology
"With You" (2022)	"Vibe" (2023)

Ha Sung-woon singles chronology
"Who You Are" (2022)	"With You" (2022)	"Focus" (2022)

Music video
- With You on YouTube

"With You" is a song recorded by South Korean singers Jimin of BTS and Ha Sung-woon for the soundtrack of the 2022 South Korean television series Our Blues. It was released as a digital single on April 24, 2022, by YamYam Entertainment.

== Background and release ==
On March 15, 2022, Korean news media announced that Jimin would be participating in the soundtrack for the then-upcoming tvN drama Our Blues. News of the single's impending release generated significant attention on social media and trended worldwide on Twitter.

The single marked the singer's first soundtrack project and was released on April 24, 2022. An accompanying music video featuring various scenes from the series was released alongside the single.

== Commercial performance ==
"With You" debuted at number 15 in South Korea, on the week 18 issue of the Gaon Digital Chart for the period dated April 24–30, 2022. The single was the second most-downloaded song of its release week, and additionally entered the component Streaming Chart at number 92. It subsequently debuted on the monthly Digital and Download charts for April at numbers 128 and 6 respectively, peaking on the May Digital Chart at number 39. The single entered the Streaming Chart for the first time that same month, moving up over 100 places (Note: "With You" entered the Streaming Chart as a "Hot" song. "Hot" songs are tracks that rise up over 100 spots on the chart to enter the 200-spot ranking.) on the chart to rank at number 73, its peak. It entered the year-end rankings for all three charts at numbers 133, 15, and 181 respectively.

In Japan, "With You" debuted at number three on Oricon's Daily Digital Singles Chart for April 24, 2022, with 2,752 downloads sold. This one day of availability coincided with the end of an ongoing tracking week (dated April 18–24) and the single entered the subsequent weekly issue of the chart, dated May 2, at number 20. It sold a further 4,970 downloads on April 25, rising to a new peak on the daily chart at number two, and also achieved a new peak on the weekly chart dated May 9 at number seven, with 5,801 cumulative downloads for the period dated April 25–May 1.

Globally, according to Luminate Data, "With You" sold 39,400 downloads and accumulated 16.5 million streams. Of this figure, the United States accounted for 10.5% (1.8 million streams) of the single's streams while 89.5% (15.1 million streams) was attributed to territories outside of the US. This earned Jimin and Ha Sung-woon their first solo entries on the Billboard Global 200 and Global Excl. US charts, at numbers 19 and 14 respectively, on the issues dated May 7, 2022. Both singers additionally debuted on the Emerging Artists chart, at numbers 12 and 13 respectively, while the single topped the corresponding Digital Song Sales chart issue, having sold 9,800 downloads in the US during the tracking period dated April 22–28.

== Accolades ==
Billboard included "With You" on its list of the "25 Best K-Pop Songs of 2022", at number 25. K-pop writer Jeff Benjamin summarized the track as a "gorgeous, acoustic-led ballad...able to perfectly narrate the bittersweet romantic drama" and "a display of a full-fledged musical synergy" between both singers.

The single was nominated for Best Original Soundtrack at the 8th APAN Star Awards, Best OST and Song of the Year at the 2022 MAMA Awards, and for the OST Award at the 32nd Seoul Music Awards,

== Charts ==
=== Weekly charts ===
Weekly chart performance
Chart (2022)	Peak position
Canada Digital Song Sales (Billboard)	4
Global 200 (Billboard)	19
Hungary (Single Top 40)	2
India International Singles (IMI)	5
Japan Digital Singles (Oricon)	7
New Zealand Hot Singles (RMNZ)	13
Philippines (Billboard)	14
South Korea (Gaon)	13
US Digital Song Sales (Billboard)	1

=== Monthly charts ===
Monthly chart performance
Chart (2022)	Position
South Korea (Gaon)	39

=== Year-end charts ===
Year-end chart performance
Chart (2022)	Position
South Korea (Circle)	133
