= Smeraldo Garden Marching Band =

Single by Jimin featuring Loco

from the album Muse
- Language: Korean
- Released: June 28, 2024
- Length: 3:02
- Label: Big Hit
- Songwriters: Steven Franks; Tommy Brown; Evan; Ghstloop; Gray; Jimin; Loco; Pdogg
- Producers: Mr. Franks; Pdogg; Ghstloop; Tommy Brown

Jimin singles chronology
"Closer Than This" (2023)	"Smeraldo Garden Marching Band" (2024)	"Who" (2024)

Loco singles chronology
"Not OK" (2023)	"Smeraldo Garden Marching Band" (2023)

Music video
- "Smeraldo Garden Marching Band" on YouTube

"Smeraldo Garden Marching Band" is a song by South Korean singer Jimin of BTS featuring South Korean rapper Loco. It was released on June 28, 2024, through Big Hit Music, as a pre-release single from Jimin's second studio album, Muse (2024).

== Commercial performance ==
"Smeraldo Garden Marching Band" debuted at number 88 on the US Billboard Hot 100 with 6.8 million streams and 11,000 downloads sold in its opening week. It also debuted at number three on the component Digital Song Sales chart and number one on the genre-specific World Digital Song Sales chart, earning Jimin his fifth chart-topper on the latter and Loco his first. The song also marked Loco's first entry on the Hot 100. Outside of the US, the song accumulated 40.4 million streams and sold 34,000 downloads, earning Jimin his fourth top-10 entry on the Billboard Global Excl. US chart at number seven—he ties with BTS bandmate V for the second-most entries on the ranking among members of the group—and Loco his first.

== Music video ==
An accompanying music video premiered alongside the single's release on June 28, 2024. Filmed as a live performance against the backdrop of a woodland landscape, Jimin performs the song as the lead vocalist of a band called the Smeraldo Garden Marching Band—Pdogg, Ghstloop, and Evan (the song's producers) appear as the other members of the band—and dances with a group of children then adult dancers whom he pairs up as couples. He joins Loco while the rapper performs his verses then participates in a choreographed sequence with the dancers. Jimin and Loco dance together briefly at the end then bow as the clip closes out.

== Accolades ==
Music program awards
Program	Date	Ref.
M Countdown	July 11, 2024	
M Countdown	July 18, 2024	

== Charts ==
=== Weekly charts ===
Weekly chart performance
Chart (2024)	Peak position
Brazil Hot 100 (Billboard)	84
Canada Digital Song Sales (Billboard)	8
Global 200 (Billboard)	16
India International Singles (IMI)	2
Japan Hot 100 (Billboard)	77
Japan Digital Singles (Oricon)	6
MENA (IFPI)	13
Netherlands (Global Top 40)	12
New Zealand Hot Singles (RMNZ)	6
Philippines (Philippines Hot 100)	52
Singapore (RIAS)	12
South Korea (Circle)	44
UK Singles (OCC)	46
US Billboard Hot 100	88
US World Digital Song Sales (Billboard)	1

=== Monthly charts ===
Monthly chart performance
Chart (2024)	Position
South Korea (Circle)	157

== Release history ==
Release dates and formats
Region	Date	Format(s)	Label	Ref.
Various	June 28, 2024	Digital download; streaming	Big Hit	
