= Set Me Free Pt. 2 =

2023 single by Jimin

Single by Jimin

from the album Face
- Language: Korean; English
- Released: March 17, 2023
- Genre: Hip hop; pop
- Length: 3:20
- Label: Big Hit
- Songwriters: Ghstloop; Pdogg; Jimin; Supreme Boi
- Producers: Pdogg; Ghstloop

Jimin singles chronology
| "Vibe" (2023) | "Set Me Free Pt. 2" (2023) | "Like Crazy" (2023) |

Music video
- "Set Me Free Pt. 2" on YouTube

"Set Me Free Pt. 2" is a song by South Korean singer Jimin of BTS, released as the lead single from his debut solo studio album Face on March 17, 2023, through Big Hit Music. An intense hip hop and pop track about Jimin's refusal to be brought down by those who criticize him and overcoming his internal battles, the song was written by Ghstloop, Pdogg, Jimin, and Supreme Boi, with the first two also responsible for production. The song features the singer rapping for the first time and also utilizes distorted vocal effects and Auto-Tune.

An accompanying music video shows Jimin performing the song, complete with elaborate choreography, in a circular room filled with flashing lights, surrounded by a large group of dancers.

The single debuted at number 30 on the UK Singles Chart, becoming the highest-charting debut single by a Korean solo artist in OCC chart history at the time, and the Billboard Hot 100 in the United States.

== Music and lyrics ==
"Set Me Free Pt. 2" was written by Jimin, Supreme Boi, Ghstloop and Pdogg, while the latter two handled the production. Musically, it is a hip-hop and pop track that incorporates "band-style" trumpets, heavy bass drum, synth brass, vocal effects, and auto-tuned vocals. Lyrically, the song was described as a "self-liberation," where the singer "depict his agitation in a way that implies he wants to break out of any boxes in which he might be placed [in]." The lyrics, “Going insane to stay sane / Raise your hands for the past me" sees the singer refusing to be defeated by his "haters" and the hard times that life throws at him. Eventually with phrases like "Set me free" and "Finally free" repeated throughout, the song sees the singer "overcome his internal battles" and "break free from his mental confines". Confident in his newfound freedom, Jimin tells his critics to "get lost while he enjoys this 'prime time' revelation" through lines such as "F*ck all the opps" and "Look at me now/ I won't stop, even if they mock me."

== Commercial performance ==
"Set Me Free Pt. 2" was the second most-downloaded song of its release week in South Korea, with only two days of availability during the period dated March 12–18, 2023, and debuted at number 27 on the week 11 issue of the Gaon Digital Chart; it also debuted on Billboard's South Korea Songs chart at number six. The song entered the top 100 of the component Streaming Chart in its second week, ranking at number 70 on the week 12 issue as the second-highest charting "Hot" entry (Note: Per the Circle Chart, "Hot" songs are those that have "Jumped up over 100 ranks".) for the week dated March 19–25.

In Japan, "Set Me Free Pt. 2" sold 4,647 copies on its first day of release, topping Oricon's daily Digital Singles chart issue for March 17, 2023. With three days of availability during an ongoing tracking period (dated March 13–19), the single went on to sell 6,423 cumulative copies and debuted atop the subsequent weekly digital chart issue dated March 27.

"Set Me Free Pt. 2" became the highest-charting debut single by a Korean solo artist in the history of the UK Singles Chart, following its debut at number 30. Jimin surpassed the record previously set by BTS bandmate J-Hope who debuted at number 37 with "On the Street" a month prior. It was both the most-downloaded and best-selling song overall for the week dated March 24–30, 2023.

Jimin earned his second official entry and highest peak on the US Billboard Hot 100 as a solo artist—he previously peaked at number 76 with the collaboration single "Vibe" by Taeyang—with "Set Me Free Pt. 2". The single debuted at number 30 on the chart issue dated April 1, 2023, with 6.4 million streams and 63,000 downloads sold, making him the only member of BTS to achieve a solo (Note: as neither a featured artist nor part of a collaboration single) top-40 entry. The single was the best-selling digital track of its release week in the country, earning Jimin his second number one on the component Digital Songs and World Digital Song Sales charts. Two of his older songs, "Filter" and "Christmas Love", reentered the World chart following "Set Me Free"'s release, at numbers five and eleven respectively. He also topped the Emerging Artists chart for the first time.

Worldwide, the single accumulated 56 million streams and 42,000 digital sales, earning Jimin his first top-10 entry and highest peak on the Billboard Global 200—he previously peaked at number 12 with "Vibe"—with its debut at number eight. He is the highest-charting member of BTS on the global ranking; bandmate Jung Kook previously peaked at number nine with "Dreamers" in 2022. In territories outside of the US, the single accumulated 49.7 million streams and 27,000 cumulative sales, debuting at number five on the Global Excl. U.S. chart; Jimin is the second member of BTS to have multiple (three) top-10 solo singles on the ranking.

== Music video ==
Directed by Oui Kim, the music video focuses heavily on the performance aspect of the song and its "really intense vibe". It was preceded by a 30-second long teaser, uploaded to YouTube on March 14, of Jimin looking "menacingly" into the camera before walking slowly through a group of dancers "dressed in gray uniformed tracksuits" as the song's melody comes "booming" in. The camera then panned around the dancers as they "burst into explosive choreography in a circular room ringed in giant squares of flashing light". Jimin's voice was heard next, singing "Set me free", then the clip ended; the song's title and release date and time appeared onscreen immediately afterwards. In an introductory video released shortly before the premiere of his album, the singer stated that he "tried to convey a sense of grandeur, powerfulness and toughness" through the song's performance.

=== Synopsis ===
The visual opens with the same scene from the teaser of Jimin looking directly at the camera before moving through a synchronized throng of dancers as the song begins. Dressed in a "dark combat-style outfit"—black bomber jacket, pants, and boots—he performs the song as the "commanding centerpiece" in an elaborate choreography routine", moving in unison across the screen with the dancers as "waves of light" flash around them. At one point, the dancers form an actual maze, at other times they surround and stare at Jimin "pointing and jeering". The lights darken momentarily and when they brighten again, Jimin appears wearing a jacket only, with a poem by German poet Rainer Maria Rilke, "Ich lebe mein leben in wachsenden ringen", (Note: translates to "I live my life in widening circles" in English) tattooed in black ink across his neck and bare chest. The dancers converge upon him as the song winds down, "maniacally mobbing and grasping at him, almost consuming him", before lifting him bodily into the air, then simultaneously collapsing to the ground, taking him with them. Jimin emerges from beneath the horde, now dressed in "a soft, white outfit", standing alone and free at the end.

=== Reception ===
The music video received 2.7 million views within its first two hours. GMA Network's Nika Roque described Jimin as "badass and edgy" in the video, while Vulture.com's Jennifer Zhan called him "living art". Ian Jay Capati of ABS-CBN summarized the video as "captivating" overall, with "jaw-dropping visuals and choreography" to match. In an opinion piece for Junkee, pop culture writer Jenna Guillaume commented that the music video highlights Jimin's personal growth through its "striking choreography...thoughtful costuming and set design." She felt that the use of a panopticon-like structure for the set alluded to "themes of imprisonment and always being watched". Regarding the visual's costuming, Guillaume likened Jimin's progression from the dark combat outfit, which she described as "indicative of a tough exterior", to being seen with fewer accessories and items of clothing, to his emerging in all white at the end, to a butterfly emerging from a cocoon, and thought it significant that this version of the singer was the one to "defeat the forces trying to overtake him" and "[stand] alone, triumphant and free by the strength of his own will."

== Accolades ==
The song won first place on the March 23 episode of M Countdown, though Jimin had not yet begun domestic music show promotions. He also won the Melon Popularity Award for the fourth week of March ending March 27.

== Charts ==
=== Weekly charts ===
Weekly chart performance
| Chart (2023) | Peak position |
|---|---|
| Australia (ARIA) | 71 |
| Austria (Ö3 Austria Top 40) | 67 |
| Canada Hot 100 (Billboard) | 45 |
| France (SNEP) | 144 |
| Global 200 (Billboard) | 8 |
| Greece International (IFPI) | 20 |
| Hungary (Single Top 40) | 2 |
| India International Singles (IMI) | 4 |
| Indonesia (Billboard) | 20 |
| Japan Hot 100 (Billboard) | 59 |
| Japan Digital Singles (Oricon) | 1 |
| Latvia (LAIPA) | 13 |
| MENA (IFPI) | 11 |
| New Zealand Hot Singles (RMNZ) | 4 |
| Peru (Billboard) | 20 |
| Philippines (Billboard) | 18 |
| Poland (Polish Streaming Top 100) | 62 |
| Portugal (AFP) | 90 |
| Singapore (RIAS) | 7 |
| South Korea (Circle) | 24 |
| Switzerland (Schweizer Hitparade) | 93 |
| UK Singles (Official Charts) | 30 |
| US Billboard Hot 100 | 30 |
| US World Digital Song Sales (Billboard) | 1 |
| Vietnam (Vietnam Hot 100) | 5 |

=== Monthly charts ===
Monthly chart performance
| Chart (2023) | Position |
|---|---|
| South Korea (Circle) | 39 |

=== Year-end charts ===
Annual chart rankings
| Chart (2023) | Rank |
|---|---|
| US Digital Song Sales (Billboard) | 29 |
