= Vibe (Taeyang song) =

Single by Taeyang featuring Jimin

from the EP Down to Earth
- Released: January 13, 2023
- Studio: The Black Label (Seoul); Dogg Bounce (Seoul)
- Genre: K-pop
- Length: 2:55
- Label: The Black Label; Interscope
- Composers: Teddy; Kush; Vince; Taeyang; Jimin; 24
- Lyricists: Taeyang; Vince
- Producer: Teddy

Taeyang singles chronology
"Wake Me Up" (2017)	"Vibe" (2023)	"Seed" (2023)

Jimin singles chronology
"With You" (2022)	"Vibe" (2023)	"Set Me Free Pt. 2" (2023)

Music video
- "Vibe" on YouTube

"Vibe" is a song by South Korean singer Taeyang, featuring Jimin of BTS. It was released through The Black Label on January 13, 2023 as the pre-release single from Taeyang's second extended play Down to Earth. The track marked his first release in over five years since White Night (2017). It was written by Taeyang and Vince and composed by Teddy, Kush, Vince, Taeyang, Jimin and 24. The song charted in over fifteen countries and reached number 76 on the Billboard Hot 100.

== Background and composition ==
Rumors about the single first began circulating at the end of 2022, when media outlets reported that Big Bang member Taeyang would be releasing a solo album in January 2023, with one of the songs likely to feature BTS member Jimin. On January 4, 2023, the release of the collaboration was officially announced through social media. This marked Taeyang's first release under YG Entertainment's subsidiary The Black Label, which he transferred to a week earlier.

== Accolades ==
"Vibe" won first place on the January 19, 2023, episode of M Countdown. It was later nominated for Best Music (Spring) at the Fact Music Awards, and for Best Collaboration, Best Dance Performance – Male Solo, and Song of the Year at the 2023 MAMA Awards, but did not win. In December, it was nominated in the Digital Song Division category at the upcoming Golden Disc Awards.

== Credits and personnel ==
Credits adapted from Melon.

- Teddy – composer, producer
- Taeyang – lyricist, composer
- Vince – lyricist, composer
- Kush – composer, arranger
- Jimin – composer
- 24 – composer, arranger
- Bang Young-joo – recording
- Yoon Dong-gun – recording
- Pdogg – recording
- Josh Gudwin – mixing
- Chris Gehringer – mastering

== Charts ==
=== Weekly charts ===
Weekly chart performance
Chart (2023)	Peak position
Australia (ARIA)	48
Canada Hot 100 (Billboard)	59
Global 200 (Billboard)	12
Hong Kong (Billboard)	13
Hungary (Single Top 40)	8
Indonesia (Billboard)	8
Japan Hot 100 (Billboard)	32
Japan Combined Singles (Oricon)	35
Malaysia (Billboard)	7
New Zealand Hot Singles (RMNZ)	8
Philippines (Billboard)	11
Singapore (RIAS)	6
South Korea (Circle)	5
Taiwan (Billboard)	6
UK Singles (Official Charts)	96
US Billboard Hot 100	76
US World Digital Song Sales (Billboard)	1
Vietnam (Vietnam Hot 100)	9

=== Monthly charts ===
Monthly chart performance
Chart (2023)	Peak position
South Korea (Circle)	7

=== Year-end charts ===
Year-end chart performance
Chart (2023)	Position
South Korea (Circle)	54

== Certifications ==
Certifications
Region	Certification	Certified units/sales
Brazil (Pro-Música Brasil)	Platinum	40,000^{‡}
^{‡} Sales+streaming figures based on certification alone.

== Release history ==
Release formats for "Vibe"
Region	Date	Format	Label	Ref.
Various	January 13, 2023	Digital download, streaming	The Black Label; Interscope	
