= Muse (Jimin album) =

Studio album by Jimin
- Released: July 19, 2024
- Length: 19:57
- Language: Korean; English
- Label: Big Hit
- Producer: Pdogg; Ghstloop; Jimin; Evan; Tommy Brown; Mr. Franks; Arcades; Jon Bellion; Pete Nappi; Tenroc; Ayo the Producer; Kofo

Jimin chronology
| Face (2023) | Muse (2024) |

Singles from Muse
- 1. "Smeraldo Garden Marching Band" Released: June 28, 2024; 2. "Who" Released: July 19, 2024

Muse is the second studio album by South Korean singer Jimin of BTS. It was released on July 19, 2024, through Big Hit Music and comprises seven songs, including "Closer Than This", the pre-release single "Smeraldo Garden Marching Band" featuring Loco, and the lead single "Who". The album debuted at number two in South Korea and on the US Billboard 200. It debuted at number three in Japan and reached the top ten in Austria, Belgium, France, Germany, Hungary, Poland, Portugal, Spain, Sweden, and Switzerland.

== Background and release ==
Muse was created simultaneously to Face, Jimin's debut album. While Face emphasizes the theme of facing oneself, Muse expands on relationships and the desire to find love. Jimin explores various facets of love throughout the album and chooses love as his Muse. The songs order reflects the storyline and the feelings of excitement that comes with love. Love is also used as a metaphor for happiness. "Who", the lead single, is placed toward the end of the tracklist to express Jimin's ongoing desire to find love.

Muse was officially announced on June 18, 2024, by Bighit Music via a Weverse notice, while Jimin was completing his mandatory military service. The album was described as "his journey to find the source of his inspiration". Pre-orders started later on that same day. The promotion schedule for the album's rollout was shared on June 19.

The tracklist was revealed on June 21. The album contains 7 tracks, with Jimin credited as a co-writer for 6 of them and as a co-producer for 2 of them. Loco and Sofia Carson feature on "Smeraldo Garden Marching Band" and "Slow Dance", respectively.

=== Promotion ===
Jimin performed "Who" on the July 22 episode of the Tonight Show Starring Jimmy Fallon. On August 4, a live performance of "Rebirth" and "Slow Dance" was released, with Sofia Carson joining to perform the latter. All of the performances were pre-recorded before Jimin's military enlistment.

== Critical reception ==
Professional ratings
Review scores
| Source | Rating |
|---|---|
| NME | 4/5 stars |

Rhian Daly of NME wrote that Muse "still captures an ambivalent tension, if far more subtle" than Jimin's debut, Face (2023). Daly remarked that "you can feel it in the way Jimin sings of love, distinctly different between the two halves of this album"—the first with songs that "veer from exuberant to tender", and the second with "sultrier" tracks. Daly concluded that while it "takes fewer risks than Face", it nevertheless "forms a cohesive, polished whole".

== Commercial performance ==
Muse debuted at number two on the South Korean Circle Album Chart, with over 771,000 copies sold of its two versions in its first week. It debuted at number three on the Japanese Oricon Albums Chart with over 83,000 physical copies sold. In the United States, Jimin achieved his second number-two debut with Muse on the Billboard 200 dated August 3, 2024. The album earned 96,000 album-equivalent units, comprising 74,000 pure album sales; 15,000 streaming-equivalent units; and 7,000 track-equivalent units.

== Track listing ==
Muse track listing
| No. | Title | Writer(s) | Producer(s) | Length |
|---|---|---|---|---|
| 1. | "Rebirth (Intro)" | Pdogg; Jimin; Tommy Brown; Taylor Hill; Ghstloop; Evan | Pdogg; Ghstloop; Jimin | 2:24 |
| 2. | "Interlude: Showtime" | Pdogg; Ghstloop; Evan; Jimin | Pdogg; Ghstloop; Evan; Jimin | 1:18 |
| 3. | "Smeraldo Garden Marching Band" (featuring Loco) | Tommy Brown; Steven Franks; Jimin; Pdogg; Evan; Ghstloop; Loco; Gray | Brown; Mr. Franks; Pdogg; Ghstloop | 3:02 |
| 4. | "Slow Dance" (featuring Sofia Carson) | Pdogg; Matt Thomson; Max Lynedoch Graham; Gabriel Brandes; Blvsh; Chris James; August Rigo; Ghstloop; Sofia Carson; Jimin; Evan | Pdogg; Arcades; Ghstloop | 3:08 |
| 5. | "Be Mine" | Pdogg; Ryan Tedder; Ali Tamposi; Jacob Kasher Hindlin; Ghstloop; Evan; Jimin | Pdogg; Ghstloop | 3:27 |
| 6. | "Who" | Jon Bellion; Pete Nappi; Jason Cornet; Pdogg; Ghstloop | Bellion; Nappi; Tenroc; Pdogg; Ghstloop | 2:50 |
| 7. | "Closer Than This" | Ghstloop; Ayo the Producer; August Rigo; Pdogg; Jimin; Evan; Kofo; Shankz | Ghstloop; Ayo the Producer; Kofo | 3:43 |
| Total length: | | | | 19:52 |

== Charts ==
=== Weekly charts ===
Weekly chart performance
| Chart (2024) | Peak position |
|---|---|
| Australian Albums (ARIA) | 27 |
| Austrian Albums (Ö3 Austria) | 4 |
| Belgian Albums (Ultratop Flanders) | 19 |
| Belgian Albums (Ultratop Wallonia) | 3 |
| Canadian Albums (Billboard) | 24 |
| Croatian International Albums (HDU) | 11 |
| Dutch Albums (Album Top 100) | 23 |
| Finnish Albums (Suomen virallinen lista) | 28 |
| French Albums (SNEP) | 3 |
| German Albums (Offizielle Top 100) | 6 |
| Greek Albums (IFPI) | 29 |
| Hungarian Albums (MAHASZ) | 4 |
| Italian Albums (FIMI) | 19 |
| Japanese Albums (Oricon) | 3 |
| Japanese Combined Albums (Oricon) | 3 |
| Japanese Hot Albums (Billboard Japan) | 3 |
| Lithuanian Albums (AGATA) | 8 |
| New Zealand Albums (RMNZ) | 17 |
| Polish Albums (ZPAV) | 5 |
| Portuguese Albums (AFP) | 3 |
| South Korean Albums (Circle) | 2 |
| Spanish Albums (Promusicae) | 8 |
| Swedish Physical Albums (Sverigetopplistan) | 6 |
| Swiss Albums (Schweizer Hitparade) | 4 |
| UK Albums (OCC) | 56 |
| US Billboard 200 | 2 |
| US World Albums (Billboard) | 1 |

=== Monthly charts ===
Monthly chart performance
| Chart (2024) | Position |
|---|---|
| Japanese Albums (Oricon) | 7 |
| South Korean Albums (Circle) | 4 |

=== Year-end charts ===
Year-end chart performance
| Chart (2024) | Position |
|---|---|
| Hungarian Albums (MAHASZ) | 87 |
| Japanese Albums (Oricon) | 44 |
| Japanese Hot Albums (Billboard Japan) | 41 |
| South Korean Albums (Circle) | 32 |
| US Billboard 200 | 200 |
| US World Albums (Billboard) | 11 |

Year-end chart performance
| Chart (2025) | Position |
|---|---|
| Japanese Hot Albums (Billboard Japan) | 87 |
| US World Albums (Billboard) | 3 |

== Certifications ==
Certifications
| Region | Certification | Certified units/sales |
|---|---|---|
| Japan (RIAJ) | Gold | 100,000^{^} |
| South Korea (KMCA) | 2× Platinum | 500,000^{^} |
^{^} Shipments figures based on certification alone.
