= Face (Jimin album) =

2023 studio album by Jimin

Studio album by Jimin
- Released: March 24, 2023
- Recorded: 2022
- Genres: Pop; hip-hop; R&B
- Length: 19:54
- Languages: Korean; English
- Label: Big Hit
- Producers: Pdogg; Ghstloop; Evan

Jimin chronology
Face (2023)	Muse (2024)

Singles from Face
- 1. "Set Me Free Pt. 2" Released: March 17, 2023; 2. "Like Crazy" Released: March 24, 2023

Face is the debut studio album (Note: Traditionally, a release that contains four to six tracks is considered an extended play (EP). Big Hit Music marketed Face as an album prior to its release and after the fact. Korean and English secondary sources, including Newsen, The Korea Herald, Billboard, Rolling Stone, etc., also refer to Face as an album rather than EP. This article follows the majority of sources and uses the album designation over EP.) by South Korean singer Jimin of BTS. Released on March 24, 2023, through Big Hit Music, it is primarily a pop, hip-hop, and R&B record, with Pdogg, Ghstloop, and Evan responsible for production. Comprising five songs, all co-written by Jimin, and one instrumental, the album was heavily inspired by the emotional impact of the COVID-19 pandemic on Jimin as a person and performer and addresses "themes of loneliness, wrestling with oneself, and finding freedom". Two singles were released in support of Face: the lead single "Set Me Free Pt. 2" and the US Billboard Hot 100 number-one single "Like Crazy".

Domestically, Face broke sales records on its opening day, selling over 1 million copies, and in its first week, surpassing 1.45 million sales, making Jimin the first solo artist in Hanteo Chart history to do so; the album subsequently debuted at number one on the Circle Album Chart. It topped the Oricon Albums and Digital Albums charts, and Billboard Japan's Hot Albums chart in Japan. Jimin is the first solo artist to debut at number one on both Oricon album charts in 2023. Face debuted at number two on the US Billboard 200, becoming the highest-charting album by a South Korean solo artist in Billboard chart history. It also reached the top ten in Austria, Belgium, Canada, France, Germany, Greece, Hungary, Lithuania, New Zealand, Poland, and Switzerland.

== Background and release ==
During the COVID-19 pandemic, Jimin experienced self-doubt about himself and his purpose as an artist, which caused him to struggle emotionally. After opening up to his BTS bandmates during their Permission to Dance on Stage tour in Las Vegas about what he was going through, thinking he was the only one, they encouraged him to try translating his thoughts and feelings into music, which served as the catalyst for him to begin actively working on his solo album. Upon returning to Korea, Jimin met up with producers from his label and work on the project commenced in early 2022. Advice from his bandmates helped the singer during production, influencing decisions about the direction the album would eventually take, which he stated was "reassuring" for him. Per an interview with Nikkei Asia, the "deep dilemmas about music" that Jimin faced throughout the creative process made him realize how much he relied on his bandmates for certain things and enabled him "to completely resolve and move on from all those feelings of being lost."

Korean media outlets first began reporting on Jimin's official solo debut in January 2023. In a livestream on February 10, Jimin confirmed that he had been working on an album and that it would be released in March. The next day, Star News reported that the singer would appear on various South Korean music programs in promotion of the album and perform two songs. Big Hit Music officially announced the album via a Weverse notice on February 21. A 35-second video "featuring ambient music and a series of water droplets spinning out ripples on the surface of water that eventually form the album's title" followed shortly afterwards. A promotion schedule for the album's rollout was shared on February 22, and the preorder period opened later that same day.

The tracklist was unveiled first, on February 23, 2023. The album comprises six tracks. Jimin is credited as a co-writer on five of them, while BTS bandmate RM is credited on three: "Face-Off" and both the Korean and English versions of "Like Crazy". A short video featuring behind-the-scenes footage of Jimin during the creative process of the album was uploaded to YouTube shortly afterwards. Big Hit released a black and white "mood" photo, of Jimin in a mostly empty room—a few pieces of furniture to the forefront are draped in white cloth that covers the entire floor—with his back to the camera as if about to leave, his silhouette illuminated by light from the doorway, on March 7. Two sets of concept photos followed on March 9 and 10 respectively. The "Hardware" version photos featured the singer dressed in a black leather jacket staring directly into the camera, followed by closeups of his face decorated with silver spikes and studs on his brow and cheekbones and a lip piercing on his lower lip, then "seemingly shirtless" with the spikes cascading down the side of his neck and across his collarbone. The "Software" version photos visually contrasted the former, with Jimin presenting a more "natural and pure aura", now dressed in white and seated on a white couch in the room from the mood photo. The accompanying closeup shots revealed a smattering of scars on the right side of his face.

=== Singles ===
"Set Me Free Pt. 2" was released ahead of the album, on March 17, 2023. Its title bears an intentional similarity to "Set Me Free" by BTS bandmate Suga, from his 2020 mixtape D-2, though neither song is actually connected to the other. In an interview with Consequence, published the day of the single's release, Jimin stated that "we weren't trying to divide part one or part two. But since it turns out my song talks about freedom and moving forward, and SUGA's song talks about some of the stories that come before, I thought it would be good to come after that." The song was chosen as the first single off Face due to its intensity and Jimin's wanting to make his solo debut "in an impactful way". Accordingly, the accompanying music video focuses heavily on the performance aspect of the song and its "really intense vibe". In the video, directed by Oui Kim, Jimin acts as the "commanding centerpiece in an elaborate choreography routine" that sees him "mov[ing] across the screen with a mob of dancers, who all perform in unison as the room flashes in waves of light". The singer described the song as having "the energy of a ray of light coming into the darkness... If I had to say specific colors, I'd say black and white." It entered the UK Singles Chart at number 30, becoming the highest-charting debut single by a Korean solo artist in the history of the chart; Jimin surpassed the record previously set by bandmate J-Hope who debuted at number 37 with "On the Street".

"Like Crazy" was released alongside the album, as its second single, on March 24. The song's accompanying music video, also directed by Kim, was inspired by the 2011 film Like Crazy. Jimin is seen sitting alone in a kitchen before being dragged by an unseen hand into a club setting where he drinks and parties with other clubgoers, sings the song in the club's bathroom, and stands in a long hallway with a dark, mud-like goo cascading down the walls. At the end of the video, he returns to the kitchen alone, with one hand covered in the goo, which he smears across the camera. "Deep House" and "UK Garage" remixes of the single were released on March 26. "Like Crazy" debuted at number eight on the UK Singles Chart, surpassing the record set by "Set Me Free" a week prior to become the highest-debuting single by a Korean solo artist in OCC chart history; he is the only member of BTS to enter the top-10.

=== Promotion ===
Jimin guested on the March 23 episode of the Tonight Show Starring Jimmy Fallon for an interview following Face's release. The following day, he appeared on the Hybe Labels channel on Melon Station on March 24 to discuss the album and other topics with fans; part one of the episode aired an hour after the album came out, while part two aired on March 25. He also participated in an "Ask Me Anything" segment on Melon Spotlight; the platform additionally published exclusive photos from the event. Later that night, Jimin appeared on the Tonight Show again, as the episode's musical guest, and gave the US television premiere performance of "Like Crazy".

== Music and lyrics ==
"[I thought] I was fine. I was happy. I was just enjoying things. But looking back, I realized that those weren't the only feelings [I had]. After realizing that, I just thought that I should overcome [these feelings]. I think I kind of learned how to become a grown-up... I'm actually not good at beating around the bush, or indirectly saying things, and that's the same with my lyrics. I just wrote the emotions as they were, exactly how I felt two years ago, and the emotions that I felt in every situation [at that time]. So if you just listen to the music, you'll understand the lyrics right away."

— Jimin on the emotional influences behind Face, Rolling Stone

Thematically, Face "delv[es] into Jimin's story of fronting his true self and making a new leap forward as an artist". As evidenced in the promotion schedule graphic, which contained notes such as "Circle of Resonance" and "Reflection of vulnerable minds and unexposed wounds", the album depicts the spectrum of emotions he experienced over the past few years during the pandemic. Musically, it spans a variety of genres, including pop, hip-hop, and R&B.

The first track, "Face-Off", is an "intense, rebellious" trap-soul song about "finding resilience after feelings of doubt and disappointment" that "has a lot of anger". It opens with a melody reminiscent of carnival music, which holds no specific significance for the song itself, but was decided upon during the production process after the producers suggested to Jimin that it "would be kind of paradoxical or ironic" to start the song in "stark contrast to the rest of those vibes". "Interlude: Dive", a "dreamy" instrumental that features sounds of water and of Jimin talking on stage, follows next. The singer felt "it would be nice to have something in-between" to bridge "Face-Off" and "Like Crazy" on the tracklist so the interlude was created. The sounds of "panting for air" and running heard on the track are of Jimin himself running around, which he recorded using his phone, as he wanted "to give this feeling that I was lost and wandering". The third track, "Like Crazy", is a synth-pop song inspired by the 2011 film of the same name—one of Jimin's favorite movies—which he first discovered through a mashup video on YouTube. In an interview with Rolling Stone, Jimin stated that the film suddenly to came mind during discussions about the album's main track as he felt "it would fit well with the kind of song [we wanted to make]", so he rewatched it and then included "different points of inspiration" into the lyrics. The singer further explained that while the song has "a feeling of dreamy intoxication" and "feels happy...there's also loneliness behind it", with lines like "I'd rather be lost in the lights/ I'm outta my mind" and "I wanna stay in this dream/ Don't save me." Excerpts from the film's dialogue, of "whispers from fraught lovers", can be heard at the song's beginning and end.

Track four, "Alone", is a "melancholic R&B" pop ballad sung in Jimin's lower register, that provides a glimpse into his pandemic experience. "Full of doubts, frustrations, and fear" and conveying bitter isolation, the song employs "vocal effects to underscore its depictions of emotional short-circuiting". "Set Me Free Pt. 2" recounts Jimin's "resolution to free himself from various emotions hidden deep inside him"—pain, sorrow, emptiness—with "assertive" lyrics about "freedom and moving forward". The song, which also showcases the singer rapping for the first time, expresses "[the ideas of] determination, passion, and overcoming". It features "big horns"; a choir whose recording Jimin flew to the United States to oversee; a "serious", "punchy", "snapping hip-hop" beat; and Auto-tuned vocals. The album closes out with the English version of "Like Crazy".

== Critical reception ==
Professional ratings
Aggregate scores
Source	Rating
Metacritic	84/100
Review scores
Source	Rating
AllMusic	4/5 stars
Consequence	83/100
NME	4/5 stars
The Quietus	80/100
Rolling Stone	80/100

Face received critical acclaim upon release, with critics agreeing that Jimin had succeeded at setting himself apart creatively and stylistically from previous works, especially those under BTS. Minor criticism was directed towards the use of Auto-Tune on the record's lead single, as well as the overall brevity of the project. At Metacritic, which assigns a normalized rating out of 100 to reviews from professional publications, the album received an average score of 84 based on five reviews, indicating "universal acclaim".

NME's Rhian Daly rated Face four stars out of five, describing it as "a facing up to reality" that "captures the complex rollercoaster of emotions that comes with that". She named "Face-Off" and "Alone" as highlights of the album, but felt that "Set Me Free Pt. 2" was "somewhat of a misfire" due to the "thick layers of auto-tune that go "beyond stylistic and symbolic and become grating." Daly concluded that while the album "might not be flawless...even in its missteps it reflects the turbulence of modern life and especially of the last few years. If Jimin's mission on this record was to stretch himself creatively and distil that dissonance in these songs, it's one that he's accomplished". India Roby of Nylon called Face "an honest scream into the void"—in comparison to the "bubbling whispers" of the singer's previous projects—that "peels back [Jimin's] layers and unlocks his full potential beyond the BTS label". "Despite the gloom and chaos" present on the album, and Jimin's "wrestl[ing] with self-inflicted torment", Roby opined that it "is ultimately a project of resilience and triumph" that gave Jimin the opportunity to showcase "a previously unseen creativity" as he "exhibits his desire to evolve beyond the BTS title" and left him "at the cusp of something even greater to come."

In her review for Rolling Stone, music writer Maura Johnston, described Face as a "twisty, yet hooky EP" that marks Jimin's first step towards "break[ing] out of any boxes in which he might be placed." She chose "Like Crazy" as the record's focal point, for the way it showcases Jimin's "limber singing style", and "Set Me Free Pt. 2" as the "most intriguing track", with its "cacophonous blend of synth brass and vocal effects", an "insistent chorus", and Jimin's voice that "turns into a siren call for self-liberation." Overall, Johnston summarized the project as "a compelling showcase of the silky-voiced singer-dancer's pop strengths". British music magazine The Quietus's Veronica A. Bastardo felt that Face was "well thought-out" despite the brevity of its runtime, commenting that Jimin "present[ed] himself as a soloist with an unexpected sound for his high-pitched countertenor voice" very unlike the ballads he was particularly known for before. She enjoyed the record's "elegant and slightly sensual approach to hip-hop pop" and the way it combined "80s lo-fi synthwave and the most staggering aspect of some grime acts who go to gospel, electronic guitars and distortion in order to deliver their statement", noting the heavy focus on "distorted hip hop and trap". Bastardo ended her review by saying that Face was a "reminder that Korean pop acts are not a square sound, but a way to mix arts together on their own terms."

Year-end lists for Face
Critic/Publication	List	Rank	Ref.
Paste	The 20 Best K-pop Albums of 2023	16	

== Commercial performance ==
According to Hanteo Chart, Face sold 1,021,532 copies (Note: 768,575 copies of the standard version of the album and 252,957 copies of the Weverse Albums version) on its first day. Jimin became the first solo artist in Hanteo Chart history to surpass one million album sales on the day of release and the fourth solo artist from a group, after Seo Taiji, Baekhyun, and BTS bandmate Jin, to have a million-selling album. The album went on to sell over 1.45 million copies in its first week of availability, breaking the record for the highest first week sales of all time by a solo artist; Lim Young-woong previously held both sales records with his debut studio album Im Hero (2022), which sold over 940,000 copies on its first day and over 1.1 million copies in its first week. Face earned Jimin his first number one on the Circle Album Chart, on the week 12 issue for the period dated March 19–25, 2023.

In Japan, the album debuted at number one on the daily Oricon Albums Chart, with 222,120 copies sold for March 24, 2023. All six of its tracks charted in the top-10 of the corresponding daily Digital Singles Chart issue: "Like Crazy" debuted at number one; "Set Me Free Pt. 2" reentered at number three; "Face-Off", Like Crazy" (English version), "Alone", and "Interlude: Dive" debuted at numbers four to seven respectively. Face subsequently topped the weekly issues of both the Oricon Albums and Digital Albums charts, as well as Billboard Japan's Hot Albums chart. Per Oricon, Jimin achieved the largest debut sales week for a solo artist in 2023, with over 225,000 (Note: 224,870 physical copies and 5,264 digital copies) copies sold for the period dated March 20–26, 2023. Face is the first album by a solo artist to debut at number one on both charts in 2023.

Face debuted at number two in the United States, on the April 8, 2023, issue of the Billboard 200, making Jimin the first artist to debut as high on the chart with a debut project since Olivia Rodrigo's Sour opened at number one in 2021. The album achieved the second-largest first week sales of the year—Morgan Wallen's third studio album One Thing at a Time holds the largest sales week of 2023 with 501,000 units on the March 18 issue—with 164,000 equivalent album units sold. This figure comprised 124,000 pure album sales, marking the largest sales week for a solo act and the third-largest overall of 2023; 13,500 streaming-equivalent units (19.51 million on-demand official streams of its songs); and 26,500 track-equivalent units (TEA)—derived mainly from the combined sales of "Like Crazy"—the largest TEA figure of the year for any album and the second-largest TEA sales week overall, behind Taylor Swift's Midnights which earned 34,000 TEA units in November 2022. Jimin became the highest-charting Korean solo artist of all time on the Billboard 200, surpassing the record previously set by RM, who peaked at number three with Indigo in December 2022. Face sold a further 20,000 pure copies in its second week, and 12,000 in its third.

According to the International Federation of the Phonographic Industry's Global Music Report for 2023, Face was the eighteenth best-selling album of the year worldwide, having sold 1.7 million units. (Note: The IFPI Global Albums chart ranks, in order, the albums that generated the most money globally across streaming, download, and physical record sales (combined) in a calendar year. The Global Album Sales Chart measures global unit sales across all physical formats, as well as full album downloads.)

== Accolades ==
In October 2023, Face received a nomination for Album of the Year at the MAMA Awards, and Top K-pop Album at the Billboard Music Awards. In November, it was nominated for Album of the Year and Million Top 10 at the Melon Music Awards.

== Track listing ==
Face digital album track listing
No.	Title	Writer(s)	Producer(s)	Length
1.	"Face-Off"	Pdogg; Ghstloop; Jimin; Evan; RM	Pdogg; Ghstloop	3:49
2.	"Interlude: Dive"	Evan; Ghstloop; Pdogg	Evan; Ghstloop; Pdogg	2:10
3.	"Like Crazy"	Pdogg; Blvsh; Chris James; Ghstloop; Jimin; RM; Evan	Pdogg; Ghstloop	3:32
4.	"Alone"	Pdogg; Jimin; Ghstloop; Evan	Pdogg	3:31
5.	"Set Me Free Pt. 2"	Ghstloop; Pdogg; Jimin; Supreme Boi	Pdogg; Ghstloop	3:20
6.	"Like Crazy" (English version)	Pdogg; Blvsh; Chris James; Ghstloop; Jimin; RM; Evan	Pdogg; Ghstloop	3:32
Total length:				19:54

Physical album hidden track
No.	Title	Writer(s)	Producer(s)	Length
7.	"Letter" (Korean: 편지)	Pdogg; Jimin; Ghstloop; Evan	Pdogg	3:50

Notes

- On the physical album, "Like Crazy" (English version) is a 10-minute long track that includes two minutes and 45 seconds of empty space after the song's end followed by the hidden track "Letter", which begins at the 6:13 mark and features background vocals by BTS-bandmate Jungkook.

== Personnel ==
Credits adapted from the liner notes of Face. Excludes songwriting and production credits already cited above.

- Duane Benjamin – choir production (track 5), choir arrangement/orchestration (track 5)
- Blvsh – background vocals (track 3), record engineering (track 3)
- Dedrick Bonner – choir arrangement/orchestration (track 5), choir (track 5), choir direction (track 5)
- Joe Brogie – voiceover samples (tracks 3, 6), record engineering (tracks 3, 6)
- Evan – keyboard (track 2), synthesizer (track 2), digital editing (tracks 2–4), guitar (track 3),
- Chris Gehringer – mastering engineering
- Serban Ghenea – mix engineering (track 3)
  - Bryce Bordone – assistant (track 3)
- Ghstloop – keyboard (tracks 1, 2, 5), synthesizer (tracks 1–3, 5), gang vocals (tracks 1, 4), digital editing (tracks 1, 3, 4),
- Chris James – record engineering (track 3)
- Jimin – keyboard (track 1), gang vocals (tracks 1, 4), foley and ambience (track 2)
- Jo Dong-moon – cello (track 2)
- Jung Woo Young – mix engineering (track 2)
- James Keys – background vocals (track 4), record engineering (track 4)
- David Kim – mix engineering (track 1)
- Nick Lee – brass/horns (track 5)
- Maiz – gang vocals (track 1)
- Pdogg – production, keyboard (tracks 1–5), synthesizer (tracks 1–5), gang vocals (tracks 1, 4), vocal and rap arrangement (track 1), record engineering (tracks 1, 3, 4), digital editing (tracks 1, 3, 4), vocal arrangement (tracks 3, 4),
- James F. Reynolds – mix engineering (track 4)
- Ryu In Hyuk – guitar (track 1, 3)
- Sumin – background vocals (track 1), recording engineering (tracks 1),
- Supreme Boi – gang vocals (track 1)
- Shelby Young – voiceover samples (tracks 3, 6), record engineering (tracks 3, 6)

== Charts ==
=== Weekly charts ===
Weekly chart performance
Chart (2023)	Peak position
Austrian Albums (Ö3 Austria)	5
Belgian Albums (Ultratop Flanders)	7
Belgian Albums (Ultratop Wallonia)	3
Canadian Albums (Billboard)	10
Danish Albums (Hitlisten)	22
Dutch Albums (Album Top 100)	35
Finnish Albums (Suomen virallinen lista)	12
French Albums (SNEP)	5
German Albums (Offizielle Top 100)	7
Greek Albums (IFPI)	1
Hungarian Albums (MAHASZ)	2
Italian Albums (FIMI)	28
Japanese Albums (Oricon)	1
Japanese Combined Albums (Oricon)	1
Japanese Hot Albums (Billboard Japan)	1
Lithuanian Albums (AGATA)	3
New Zealand Albums (RMNZ)	8
Polish Albums (ZPAV)	3
Portuguese Albums (AFP)	35
South Korean Albums (Circle)	1
Spanish Albums (Promusicae)	22
Swedish Albums (Sverigetopplistan)	55
Swiss Albums (Schweizer Hitparade)	6
UK Album Downloads (Official Charts)	29
US Billboard 200	2
US World Albums (Billboard)	1

=== Monthly charts ===
Monthly chart performance
Chart (2023)	Peak position
Japanese Albums (Oricon)	2
South Korean Albums (Circle)	2

=== Year-end charts ===
Year-end chart performance
Chart (2023)	Position
French Albums (SNEP)	198
Japanese Albums (Oricon)	17
Japanese Hot Albums (Billboard Japan)	20
South Korean Albums (Circle)	23
US Billboard 200	193
US World Albums (Billboard)	5

== Certifications and sales ==
Certifications and sales
Region	Certification	Certified units/sales
Japan (RIAJ)	Platinum	250,000^{^}
South Korea (KMCA) Regular version	Million	1,000,000^{^}
South Korea (KMCA) Weverse Albums version	Platinum	250,000^{^}
Summaries
Worldwide (IFPI)	—	1,700,000
^{^} Shipments figures based on certification alone.

== Release history ==
Face release history
Region	Date	Format	Version	Label	Ref.
Various	March 24, 2023	CD; digital download; streaming	Regular; Weverse US exclusive; Weverse Albums	Big Hit	
Japan	March 25, 2023	CD; digital download; streaming	Regular; Weverse US exclusive; Weverse Albums	Big Hit	
United States	March 24, 2023	CD; digital download; streaming	Regular; Weverse US exclusive	Big Hit	
United States	April 10, 2023	Digital download; streaming	Weverse Albums	Big Hit	
South Korea	December 8, 2023	Vinyl	—N/a	Big Hit	
Various	December 8, 2023	Vinyl	—N/a	Big Hit	
Japan	December 15, 2023	Vinyl	—N/a	Big Hit	
Europe	January 12, 2024	Vinyl	—N/a	Big Hit	
United States	January 12, 2024	Vinyl	—N/a	Big Hit	

== See also ==
- List of best-selling albums in South Korea
- List of Oricon number-one albums of 2023
- List of Circle Album Chart number ones of 2023
