= Angel Pt. 1 =

2023 single by Kodak Black and NLE Choppa featuring Jimin, Jvke and Muni Long

Single by Kodak Black and NLE Choppa featuring Jimin, Jvke and Muni Long

from the album Fast X (Original Motion Picture Soundtrack)
- Released: May 18, 2023
- Length: 2:55
- Label: Artist Partner; Atlantic
- Songwriters: Bill Kapri; Bryson Potts; Daniel Majic; Jackson Foote; James Abrahart; Jaucquez Lowe; Jeremy Dussolliet; Johnny Simpson; Mark Nilan Jr.; Tylon Freeman
- Producers: Nilan Jr.; Majic

Kodak Black singles chronology
"Rocketman (Remix)" (2023)	"Angel Pt. 1" (2023)	"Gunsmoke Town" (2023)

NLE Choppa singles chronology
"We On Em" (2023)	"Angel Pt. 1" (2023)	"Triple A" (2023)

Jimin singles chronology
"Like Crazy" (2023)	"Angel Pt. 1" (2023)	"Angel Pt. 2" (2023)

Jvke singles chronology
"Fool 4 U" (2023)	"Angel Pt. 1" (2023)	"Angel Pt. 2" (2023)

Muni Long singles chronology
"IYKYK" (2023)	"Angel Pt. 1" (2023)	"Angel Pt. 2" (2023)

Music video
- "Angel Pt. 1" on YouTube

"Angel Pt. 1" is a song by American rappers Kodak Black and NLE Choppa featuring South Korean singer Jimin and American singers Jvke and Muni Long. It was released on May 18, 2023, as the fourth single from the soundtrack to the American action film Fast X (2023).

== Background ==
On May 9, 2023, the song was previewed on Twitter and announced as a single from the soundtrack of Fast X. The single was released on May 18, 2023, a day before the film and its soundtrack were released.

In an interview with PopSugar, NLE Choppa stated:

I've actually been for a while manifesting wanting to work with BTS and to be able to work with just one of the guys from BTS — on the Fast & Furious soundtrack, something so big — I feel like it's a beautiful thing, and it's one of those things I prayed for. So, every time you hear BTS in my mouth or Jimin in my mouth, there's gonna be a thank you behind it, because I'm just grateful knowing how big that scene is and grateful to know how big the impact they have on K-pop is in general.

== Composition and lyrics ==
The song starts with piano melodies as Jvke and Jimin sing the chorus, followed by a verse from Kodak Black about persisting through hard times and the importance of family ties. In the second chorus, Muni Long sings the first half and duets with Jimin in the second. NLE Choppa's verse details escaping adversity. Lyrically, the song centers on the theme of keeping loved ones close. "Angel Pt. 1" is written in a key of B-flat minor with a tempo of 85 beats per minute.

== Critical reception ==
Alexander Cole of HotNewHipHop wrote, "Overall, it makes for a solid collaboration that also comes with great vocal performances from Muni Long." Marv Calderon of XMPL Magazine dubbed the song "collaboration of the year."

== Music video ==
An official music video was directed by Stripmall and released alongside the single. It begins with Jvke playing piano, after which Jimin appears singing from a rooftop in New York City during sunset. The video features shots of fast and high-end cars, lights, city skylines, in addition to psychedelic visuals, interspersed with clips from Fast X.

== "Angel Pt. 2" ==
A second version of the song, featuring American singer Charlie Puth instead of NLE Choppa and Kodak Black, was released on June 15, 2023.

== Charts ==
=== Weekly charts ===
==== "Angel Pt. 1" ====
Weekly chart performance
Chart (2023)	Peak position
Canada Hot 100 (Billboard)	63
Global 200 (Billboard)	16
Hungary (Single Top 40)	11
India International Singles (IMI)	7
Ireland (IRMA)	99
Japan Hot 100 (Billboard)	80
Japan Digital Singles (Oricon)	6
Malaysia (Billboard)	14
Malaysia International (RIM)	13
New Zealand Hot Singles (RMNZ)	6
Peru (Billboard)	17
Philippines (Billboard)	18
Singapore (RIAS)	13
South Korea (Circle)	72
UK Singles (Official Charts)	82
US Billboard Hot 100	65
US Hot R&B/Hip-Hop Songs (Billboard)	18
US Pop Airplay (Billboard)	35
Vietnam (Vietnam Hot 100)	2

==== "Angel Pt. 2" ====
Weekly chart performance
Chart (2023)	Peak position
New Zealand Hot Singles (RMNZ)	23
South Korea (Circle)	128

=== Monthly charts ===
Monthly chart performance
Chart (2023)	Position
South Korea (Circle)	80

== Certifications ==
Certifications
Region	Certification	Certified units/sales
Brazil (Pro-Música Brasil)	Platinum	40,000^{‡}
^{‡} Sales+streaming figures based on certification alone.

Certifications
Region	Certification	Certified units/sales
Brazil (Pro-Música Brasil)	Gold	20,000^{‡}
^{‡} Sales+streaming figures based on certification alone.

== Release history ==
Release dates and formats
Region	Date	Format	Version	Label	Ref.
Various	May 18, 2023	Digital download; streaming	Original	Artist Partner; Atlantic	
United States	June 6, 2023	Contemporary hit radio	Original	Artist Partner	
Various	June 15, 2023	Digital download; streaming	Pt. 2	Artist Partner; Atlantic	
Italy	June 23, 2023	Radio airplay	Pt. 2	Universal	
Various	May 13, 2024	Digital download; streaming	Anniversary	Artist Partner; Universal	
