= Jimin =

South Korean singer (born 1995)

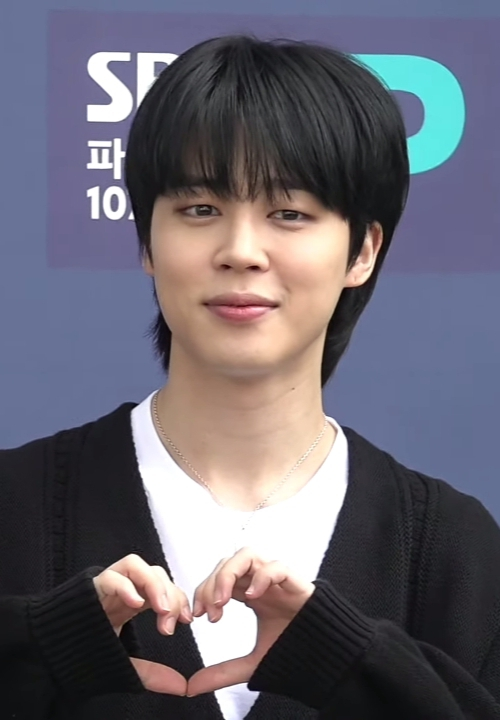
- Jimin in March 2023
- Born: Park Ji-min; October 13, 1995 (age 31); Busan, South Korea
- Education: Global Cyber University
- Occupations: Singer; Dancer
- Works: Discography
- Awards: Full list
- Honours: Hwagwan Order of Cultural Merit (2018)
- Musical career
- Genres: K-pop; alternative R&B
- Instrument: Vocals
- Years active: 2013–present
- Label: Big Hit
- Member of: BTS

Korean name
- Hangul: 박지민
- Hanja: 朴智旻
- RR: Bak Jimin
- MR: Pak Chimin

Park Ji-min (Korean: 박지민; born October 13, 1995), known mononymously as Jimin, is a South Korean singer, songwriter, and dancer. In 2013, he made his debut as a member of the South Korean boy band BTS, under the record label Big Hit Entertainment. Jimin has released three solo tracks under BTS' name—"Lie" in 2016, "Serendipity" in 2017, and "Filter" in 2020—all of which have charted on South Korea's Gaon Digital Chart.

He released his first credited solo song, the digital track "Promise", which he co-wrote, in 2018 and recorded the duet "With You" with Ha Sung-woon for the soundtrack for the TvN drama Our Blues in 2022. Jimin released his debut solo album, Face in 2023, which debuted at number one in South Korea and Japan and number two on the US Billboard 200, making him the highest-charting Korean solo artist on the latter chart. The album's single "Like Crazy" became the first song by a Korean solo artist to debut at number one on the US Billboard Hot 100 in history. Jimin also became the first Korean solo artist to top the Billboard Artist 100 chart. In 2024, he released his second album, Muse, and its lead single "Who", which debuted at number one on the Billboard Global 200.

== Early life and education ==
Park Ji-min was born on October 13, 1995, in Geumjeong District, Busan, South Korea. He is of the Milyang Park clan. His immediate family includes his mother, father, and younger brother.

When he was a child, he attended Busan's Hodong Elementary School and Yonsan Middle School. In middle school, he attended Just Dance Academy, where he learned popping and locking. Prior to becoming a trainee, Jimin studied contemporary dance at Busan High School of Arts and was a top student in the modern dance department. A teacher suggested that he join an entertainment company, leading him to Big Hit Entertainment. Once he passed the auditions in 2012, he transferred to Korean Arts High School, graduating in 2014.

Jimin graduated from Global Cyber University in August 2020 with a major in Broadcasting and Entertainment. He was awarded the President's Award, the school's highest honor. As of 2021, he is enrolled at Hanyang Cyber University, pursuing a Master of Business Administration in Advertising and Media.

== Career ==
=== 2013–present: BTS ===
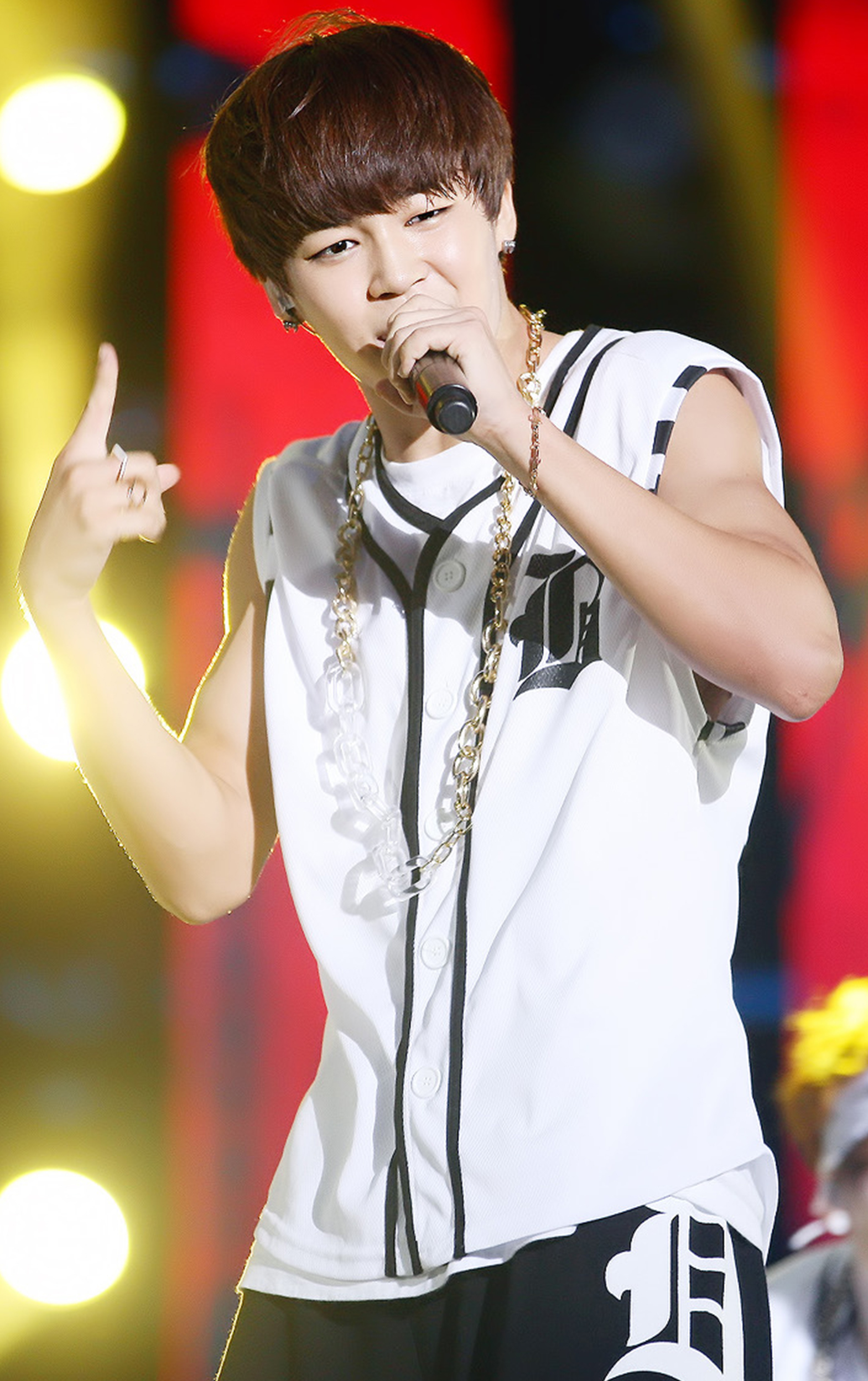
Jimin performing in September 2013

Jimin was the last Big Hit trainee to be added to the lineup that would eventually become BTS. Of the band's seven members, he spent the shortest period of time—six months—as a trainee prior to debuting. On June 13, 2013, he debuted as a vocalist and dancer in BTS with the song "No More Dream" from their first single 2 Cool 4 Skool. Under the band's name, he released three solo songs: "Lie", "Serendipity", and "Filter". "Lie" was released in 2016, as part of the band's second Korean studio album, Wings. It was described as stunning and dramatic, conveying dark undertones and emotions in line with the overall concept of the album. In contrast, "Serendipity", from the band's Love Yourself: Her (2017) extended play (EP), was soft and sensual, expressing the joy, conviction, and curiosity of love. "Filter", a track from BTS' 2020 studio album Map of the Soul: 7, had a Latin pop flair, with lyrics reflecting the different sides of Jimin that he shows to the world and those around him. Jimin additionally co-wrote and co-produced another track included on that album, "Friends", which was later featured in the Marvel Studios film Eternals.

"Serendipity" and "Lie" both surpassed fifty million streams on Spotify in 2018, followed shortly thereafter by the former's full length version from BTS' Love Yourself: Answer (2018) compilation album, which achieved the milestone in early 2019. Jimin became the first Korean artist to have three solo tracks accumulate over 50 million streams each, surpassing Psy, who previously crossed the 50 million streams mark twice with "Gangnam Style" (2012) and "Gentleman" (2013). Both songs were also the only solos by a BTS member included in the Official Charts Company's (OCC) list of the top 20 most streamed BTS songs in the United Kingdom as of October 2018, ranking at number 17 and 19 respectively. In April 2019, the list was expanded to reflect the top 40, and both tracks were the highest ranked solos included that year, at numbers 18 and 20 respectively.

In May 2019, Jimin became the first BTS member to have a solo music video achieve 100 million views on YouTube when "Serendipity" surpassed the milestone. He remained the only BTS member with multiple solo songs in the January 2020 update of the OCC's top 40 list: "Lie" and "Serendipity" were the second and third most-streamed solos, at numbers 24 and 29 respectively, with the full-length version of the latter at number 38. The following month, Jimin earned his first entry on the Billboard Hot 100 with "Filter", which debuted at number 87 on the chart, as well his first number one on the World Digital Song Sales chart. The song set the record for the biggest streaming debut among all Korean songs on Spotify, accruing over 2.2 million streams in its first 24 hours of release, and went on to become the fastest Korean solo in the platform's history to surpass 20–60 million streams. It was also the only solo album track by BTS to receive a Song of the Year nomination at the Gaon Chart Music Awards. In March 2021, "Filter" became the 15th BTS song to spend a full year on Billboard's World Digital Song Sales chart. It was the longest-charting Korean song released in 2020 on the ranking, having spent 80 weeks on the chart as of the issue dated October 9, 2021.

Jimin was awarded the fifth-class Hwagwan Order of Cultural Merit in 2018, alongside his bandmates, by the President of South Korea, Moon Jae-in, for their contributions to the promotion of Korean culture. Three years later, Moon appointed him Special Presidential Envoy for Future Generations and Culture, alongside his bandmates, to help "lead the global agenda for future generations" and "expand South Korea's diplomatic efforts and global standing" in the international community.

=== 2014–present: Solo work ===
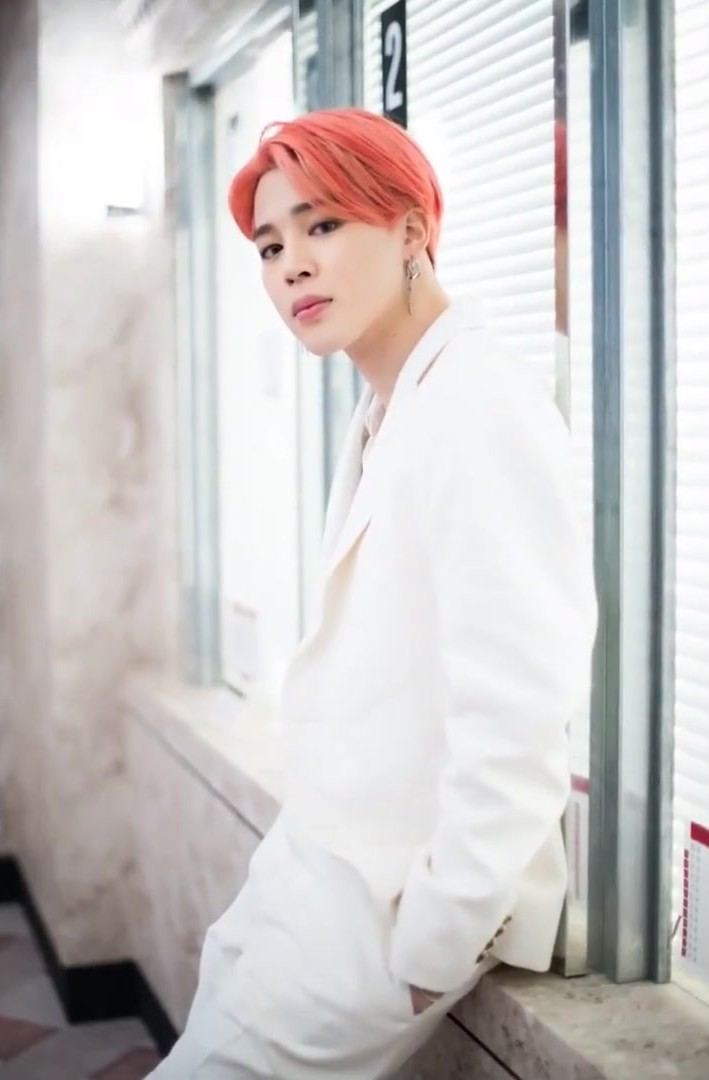
Jimin on the set of the "Boy with Luv" music video, March 2019.

In 2014, Jimin collaborated with bandmate Jung Kook on a song called "Christmas Day", a Korean rendition of Justin Bieber's "Mistletoe"; Jimin wrote the Korean lyrics himself. The two collaborated again in 2017, on a cover of Charlie Puth's "We Don't Talk Anymore" featuring Selena Gomez. Jung Kook previously released a solo version of the song in February, and the two prepared the duet as a special gift to the band's fandom, releasing it on June 2, during BTS' fourth anniversary celebrations. Teen Vogue wrote that "adding Jimin's voice to the mix makes the rendition all the more lovely", while the Canadian outlet Flare magazine stated that "it honestly might be better than the original". Elite Daily described the cover as "nothing short of flawless".

Jimin appeared on several variety shows such as Hello Counselor, Please Take Care of My Refrigerator, and God's Workplace in 2016. He also served as a special MC on domestic television music programs such as Show! Music Core and M Countdown. In December 2016, he participated in a dance duet at the KBS Song Festival with Taemin from Shinee.

On December 30, 2018, Jimin released "Promise", his first credited song as a solo artist, for free on BTS' SoundCloud page. It earned the biggest 24-hour debut in SoundCloud history with 8.5 million streams, surpassing previous record holder Drake's "Duppy Freestyle" which received 4.9 million streams, and would go on to become the most streamed song on the platform by December 2021, with over 300 million streams. Described by Billboard as a "mellow pop ballad", the song was composed by Jimin and Big Hit producer Slow Rabbit, who also produced the track, and features lyrics written by Jimin and bandmate RM. Jimin released his second solo song "Christmas Love", about his childhood memories of the holidays, on December 24, 2020. In 2022, he contributed the single "With You", a duet with Ha Sung-woon, to the soundtrack of the TvN drama Our Blues; the single was released on April 24.

In January 2023, Jimin co-wrote and featured on the single "Vibe" by Taeyang. His first official solo project since BTS announced an increased focus on individual music endeavors a year prior, the single earned Jimin his debut entry on the Billboard Hot 100 as a solo artist, at number 76. He was announced as a global ambassador for Dior later that month, and for Tiffany & Co. in March. "Promise" and "Christmas Love" were made available on streaming platforms worldwide as official singles under Jimin's name on March 6. His debut solo album Face was released on March 24. It set several chart and sales records, debuting at number one in South Korea and Japan, and number two in the US, making Jimin the highest-charting Korean solo artist of all time on the Billboard 200. The album's two singles, "Set Me Free Pt. 2" and "Like Crazy", released on March 17 and 24 respectively, both entered the Hot 100: the former debuted at number 30, while the latter debuted at number one, making Jimin the first South Korean solo artist in history to top the chart. The album's release led Jimin to become the first Korean solo artist to reach number one on the Billboard Artist 100. In May, he appeared as a featured artist, alongside Jvke and Muni Long, on the single "Angel Pt. 1" by Kodak Black and NLE Choppa, as part of the soundtrack for the film Fast X. The digital single "Closer Than This" was released on December 22, shortly after Jimin enlisted in the South Korean Army. Originally recorded during the production of Face, it is a song dedicated to the BTS fandom in gratitude for their support.

Big Hit announced an eight-episode travel reality series, Are You Sure?!, featuring Jimin and Jung Kook on July 2, 2024. Available for streaming exclusively on Disney+, the premiere episode aired August 8, with subsequent episodes following weekly through September 19. The label released Jimin's second solo album, Muse, on July 19, while he was carrying out his mandatory military service. It was supported by the singles "Smeraldo Garden Marching Band" and "Who". "Who" became Jimin's first song to debut atop both of Billboard's global charts and the longest-charting song by a Korean artist on the Billboard Hot 100 after spending 33 weeks on the chart, surpassing BTS' "Dynamite".

== Artistry ==
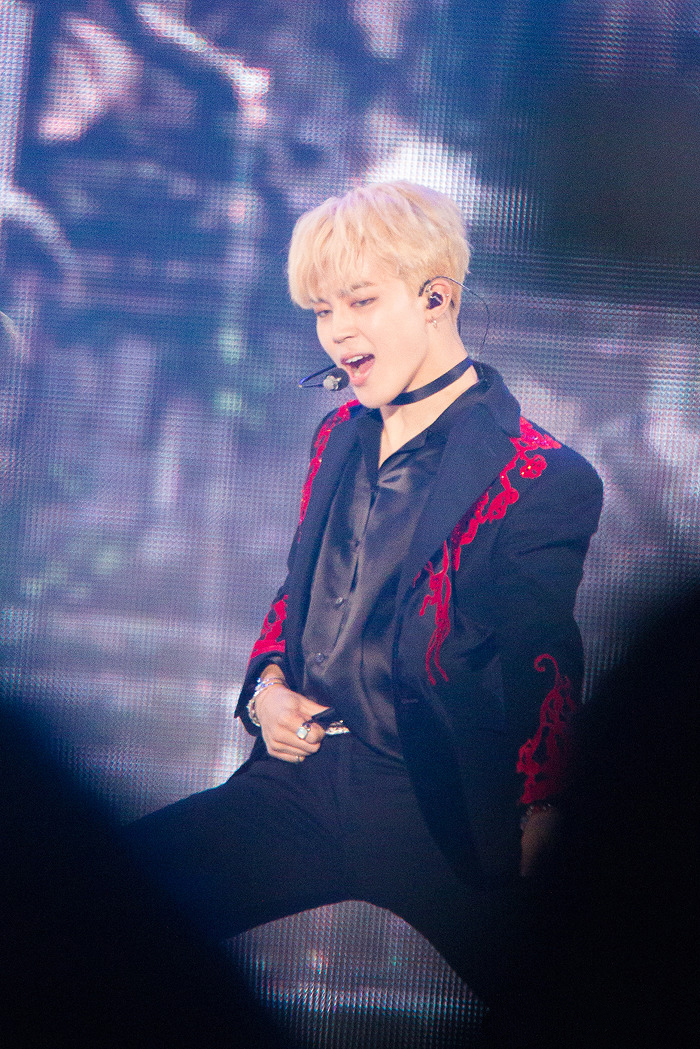
Jimin performing "Blood Sweat & Tears" at the 2016 Melon Music Awards.

Jimin's vocals have been described as delicate and sweet. He is regarded as an exceptional dancer among the members of BTS and in K-pop in general, often praised for his "smooth and elegant movements" and charm on stage. In the documentary Burn the Stage released in 2018, Jimin addressed his perfectionism. In 2023, Jimin stated that as a pop artist, he "aims to excel at both dancing and singing and perform a diverse range of musical genres and themes" while "taking a healthy and sustainable approach to do so".

He has cited singer Rain as an inspiration and one of the reasons why he wanted to become a singer and performer.

== Impact and influence ==
In 2016, Jimin was ranked as the 14th most popular idol in an annual survey conducted by Gallup Korea. He subsequently ranked seventh in 2017, and then consecutively ranked first in 2018 and 2019, as the only idol to top the survey for two consecutive years. In 2018, Jimin was the ninth most-tweeted about celebrity and the eighth most-tweeted about musician globally. He was named the 17th best boy band member in history by The Guardian. From January to May 2018, Jimin won the monthly "Top K-Pop Artist–Individual" award for Peeper x Billboard, a collaboration between the Peeper social media app and Billboard Korea that collects fan votes for their favorite K-pop artists. The prize was a donation to UNICEF in his name.

The Cultural Conservation Society awarded Jimin a plaque of appreciation in 2019, for performing buchaechum, a traditional Korean fan dance, during the 2018 Melon Music Awards and helping spread the dance outside of Korea. In October 2021, he became the first idol to spend 34 consecutive months atop the brand reputation ranking for individual boy group idols and the only one to top the overall ranking for three consecutive years.

Jimin is often cited as a role model by various idols in the K-pop industry, many of whom try to emulate his style of dance, mannerisms, and stage presence; media outlets have called him the "Idol of Idols", "Idol's Bible", and "Rookies' Bible". Artists who have cited him as an influence include Arthur of Kingdom, Bic of MCND, Kim Si-hun of BDC, Woochul of Newkidd, Hyunjin of Stray Kids, Wooyoung of Ateez, Lim Se-jun of Victon, HueningKai and Beomgyu of Tomorrow X Together, and Ni-Ki and Jay of Enhypen. British internet personality Oli London underwent 15 cosmetic surgeries by 2020 to resemble Jimin.

Jimin has also been acknowledged beyond the K-pop industry. In 2019, Award-winning director and photographer Gus Van Sant named him as the artist he wished to work with. In 2021, Olympic figure skater Yuzuru Hanyu shared being a BTS fan and mentioned Jimin as a source of inspiration for his dance movements on the rink. In 2023, Ryan Gosling gifted Jimin the guitar his character Ken used in the movie Barbie, as Jimin's "Permission to Dance" music video outfit served as inspiration for one of the outfits Gosling wore for the role.

Forbes Korea included Jimin on the Forbes Korea Power Celebrity 40 for 2024, at number seven, making him the highest ranking K-pop soloist and second-highest ranking soloist on the list. In 2025, Jimin made it to the Madame Tussauds Hot 100 list, recognizing him as a K-pop star.

== Philanthropy ==
=== Education ===
Jimin is a supporter of education and the arts. From 2016 to 2018, he covered uniform expenses of students at his alma mater, Busan Hodong Elementary School. After the school's closing was announced, he donated summer and winter middle school uniforms to the final graduates and gifted autographed albums to the entire student body. In early 2019, Jimin donated ₩100 million (equivalent to ₩117.23 million or US$87,468.18 in 2025) to the Busan Department of Education to help support students from low income families. Of the total, ₩30 million (equivalent to ₩35.17 million or US$26,240.45 in 2025) went to his alma mater, Busan Arts High School. In July 2020, he donated ₩100 million (equivalent to ₩116.61 million or US$87,000.74 in 2025) to the Jeonnam Future Education Foundation to fund the creation of a scholarship fund for talented students from South Jeolla Province who were struggling financially.

In September 2022, Jimin made a donation to the Gangwon Provincial Office of Education. In March 2023, he donated ₩100 million (US$74,611.5) to the North Chungcheong Provincial Office of Education to fund books and reading education programs for students. In May 2024, he made a donation of ₩100 million (US$74,611.5) to the South Gyeongsang Provincial Office of Education to create a scholarship for underprivileged students. In September 2024, Jimin donated ₩100 million (US$74,611.5) to fund scholarships, along with living and medical expenses for Korean soldiers. The donation serves to support families of soldiers who have struggled, suffered a loss, or passed. Following his donation, Jimin was appointed to the honor society of the Community Chest of Korea's Chungnam branch. In July 2025, he donated ₩100 million (US$74,611.5) to the Jeonbuk Office of Education in the North Jeolla Province. This marked his 6th donation since 2019 to Provincial Offices of Education for the creation of scholarships for deprived students.

=== Other philanthropy ===
In July 2021, Jimin donated ₩100 million (equivalent to ₩113.76 million or US$84,880.15 in 2025) to Rotary International to help polio patients. As with previous donations, the benefaction was made privately but became public in September, when the Go-seong Rotary Club displayed a banner thanking him for the donation. He was announced as a member of the Green Noble Club, a group of major donors to the Green Umbrella Children's Foundation who have contributed ₩100 million or more, on October 12, 2021. In February 2023, he donated ₩100 million (US$74,611.5) through the Korean UNICEF Committee toward emergency relief for children affected by the Turkey–Syria earthquake.

In August 2023, Jimin participated in the "Hometown Love Donation System", a program allowing non-residents to donate to support welfare in Nam District, Busan. He donated the maximum allowed donation amount of ₩5 million (US$3,730.57) and proceeded to re-donate his campaign's donor return gifts to people in need in the region. In February 2024, Jimin was inducted in the Nam-gu Hometown Love Donation System Donor Hall of Fame for his contribution to the district welfare programs.

In December 2024, Jimin donated ₩30 million (US$22,383.45) to the Busan Habitat Challenge, a project aiming to improve the living conditions of the elderly in the city. In March 2025, he donated ₩100 million (US$74,611.5) to support firefighters following the wildfires in the Gyeongbuk region.

== Personal life ==
Since 2018, Jimin has lived in Hannam-dong, Seoul, South Korea, with his bandmates. In 2021, he purchased a property in the area worth ₩5.9 billion (equivalent to ₩6.71 billion or US$5.01 million in 2025).

=== Health ===
In 2017, during BTS' Wings Tour, Jimin was unable to participate in the show in Macau due to neck and shoulder cramping. The following year, while in London for the Love Yourself World Tour, he withdrew from the band's scheduled performance on The Graham Norton Show because of "severe muscle pain in his neck and back", according to a statement released by Big Hit Entertainment.

In 2022, Jimin was hospitalized after having abdominal pain and a mild sore throat. He underwent appendicitis surgery on January 31 and received a positive COVID-19 diagnosis.

=== Military service ===
On November 22, 2023, Big Hit announced through Weverse that Jimin, along with bandmates RM, V, and Jung Kook, had started the enlistment process to carry out his mandatory military service. He enlisted as an active duty soldier on December 12 at the Army 5th Division Recruit Training Center in Yeoncheon with Jung Kook using the buddy system. He completed his five weeks of basic training in January 2024, placing first as an outstanding trainee and received the Best trainee commendation award from the Division Commander, taking an oath as the representative of all trainees in his unit. He was then appointed to an Artillery Unit in the 5th Infantry Division. In June, Jimin received an early promotion and was selected as a Special Class Warrior for his excellent military performance. He was formally discharged on June 11, 2025.

== Discography ==
- Face (2023)
- Muse (2024)

== Filmography ==
=== Television ===
Jimin television work
Year	Title	Role	Note(s)	Ref.
2016	Show! Music Core	Host	with Jung Kook	
2016	M Countdown	Host	with Jin	
2017	M Countdown	Host	with RM and J-Hope	
2024	Are You Sure?!	Himself	Disney+ exclusive 8-episode travel reality series with Jung Kook	
2025	Are You Sure?! Season 2	Himself	Disney+ exclusive 8-episode travel reality series with Jung Kook (Season 2)	
