= Like Crazy (song) =

- Remixes cover

Single by Jimin

from the album Face
- Language: Korean; English
- Released: March 24, 2023
- Genre: Synth-pop
- Length: 3:32
- Label: Big Hit
- Songwriters: Pdogg; Blvsh; Chris James; Ghstloop; Jimin; RM; Evan
- Producers: Pdogg; Ghstloop

Jimin singles chronology
"Set Me Free Pt. 2" (2023)	"Like Crazy" (2023)	"Angel Pt. 1" (2023)

Music video
- "Like Crazy" on YouTube

"Like Crazy" is a song by South Korean singer Jimin of BTS, released as the second single from his debut solo studio album Face on March 24, 2023. A synth-pop track produced by Pdogg and Ghstloop, two versions of the song were recorded: one in Korean and one in English. Lyrically, the Korean version talks about the realization of losing a loved one and holding on to a reality where they still exist, while the English version addresses the burden of stardom and fear of losing oneself. Both versions were written by Pdogg, Blvsh, Chris James, Ghstloop, Jimin, BTS bandmate RM, and Evan.

The single is the first by a South Korean solo artist to debut atop the Billboard Hot 100 since the chart's inception in 1958, and achieved the highest debut for a South Korean solo artist on the UK Singles Chart at number eight. It peaked in the top 10 of charts in Hungary, India, the Netherlands, Singapore, and South Korea, and on Billboard's Hits of the World charts in Hong Kong, Indonesia, Malaysia, Peru, the Philippines, and Taiwan.

== Music and lyrics ==
Musically "Like Crazy" is a "metallic" synth-pop track inspired by the 2011 film of the same name, and features whispered dialogue, heard at its beginning and end, also inspired by the film. Lyrically, the Korean version talks about the realization of losing a loved one and refusing to wake up to that reality. NME's Rhian Daly interpreted the track as a "struggle to keep something alive – be that a relationship or a certain incarnation of Jimin's being", that "tells a story of heartbreak and trying to cling onto something that's falling apart". Jimin sings lines like "As the loud music plays / I'm fading away" and "A cliché story like a drama / I'm getting used to it / Did I come too far to find the me you used to know?" that touch on the song's "gloomy outlook", while subsequent lyrics, such as "I'd rather be / Lost in the lights / Lost in the lights" and "I'm outta my mind / Please hold onto the end of this night", point to "escapism tinged with hope – a yearning to not have to face the painful reality morning will bring".

The English version addresses the burden of stardom and the fear of losing oneself. In it, Jimin sings "I can hear the voices listening / Don't know who they are" and "Trying to take the pressure off / Been reaching for the stars / Tell me will I find myself again / When I go too far?"

== Commercial performance ==
"Like Crazy" debuted on the South Korea's Circle Chart at number nine on the Global K-Pop Chart category with only two days of tracking, reaching its peak at number two in the subsequent week. The song also debuted at number one on the Download Chart and at number 25 on the Digital Chart, reaching its peak at number eight.

"Like Crazy" sold 2,803 downloads on its opening day in Japan and debuted at number two on Oricon's Daily Digital Singles Chart for March 24, 2023; the English version debuted at number five. With only three days of availability during the tracking period dated March 20–26, it entered the subsequent weekly chart issue at number nine with 3,308 cumulative downloads. The Deep House Remix and English version also entered the weekly chart at numbers 29 and 30, with 1,725 and 1,699 downloads, respectively, while the UK Garage Remix charted at number 38 with 1,439 downloads.

Jimin broke the record for the highest debut by a South Korean solo artist on the UK Singles Chart, set by his own single "Set Me Free Pt. 2" a week prior when it debuted at number 30, with "Like Crazy", which debuted at number eight. The single was the most-downloaded and second best-selling song overall for the week dated March 31–April 6, 2023.

"Like Crazy" debuted atop the April 8, 2023, issue of the Billboard Hot 100 in the United States, becoming the 66th song to do so since the chart's inception in 1958. Jimin is the first South Korean solo artist in history to achieve a number one debut (previously, Psy peaked at number two with "Gangnam Style" in 2012) and the fourth Asian artist (after Kyu Sakamoto, Far East Movement, and BTS) to top the Hot 100. In its opening week, the song sold 254,000 downloads and CD singles combined, becoming Jimin's third number one on the Digital Song Sales chart; accrued 10 million streams, marking Jimin's debut entry on the Streaming Songs chart at number 35; and received 64,000 radio airplay audience impressions, the lowest figure of the decade thus far, as the song was not actively promoted to radio. The song earned the highest single sales week since Taylor Swift's "Anti-Hero" sold 328,000 copies in November 2022. Jimin is the first member of BTS to achieve a number one song and chart debut; to earn a top-10 and top-20 entry; and to have multiple top-40 entries. "Like Crazy" is Jimin's first song as a credited songwriter to reach number one, while it is the fourth for bandmate RM (after "Life Goes On", "Butter", and "My Universe"). The song descended to number 45 in its second week on the Hot 100, which broke the record for the biggest drop from number one at the time and has since been surpassed by Travis Scott's "4x4".

The song became the first by a Korean artist to debut at number one in the Middle East and North Africa (MENA) region when it topped the Official MENA Chart, published by the International Federation of the Phonographic Industry (IFPI), for the week ending March 30, 2023.

Worldwide, "Like Crazy" accumulated 71.2 million streams and 86,000 sales, debuting at number two on the Billboard Global 200. Jimin is the highest-charting BTS member on the Global 200; the second, after bandmate Jungkook, to earn two solo top-10 entries; and the first to do so as a lead artist on both songs. In territories outside the US, the song accumulated 61.4 million streams and 48,000 sales, debuting at number two on the Global Excl US chart; Jimin remained the highest-charting BTS member on the ranking. It marked his overall third entry on the chart, tying him with Jungkook for the most solo top-10 entries by a BTS member, although Jimin is the first to earn three as a lead artist on each song.

== Music video ==
The song's accompanying music video, directed by Oui Kim, opens with a whispered voiceover of dialogue inspired by the 2011 film Like Crazy. A female voice is heard saying "I think we could last forever" while Jimin is seen "standing in a green swirl of light in a packed nightclub". A male voice then responds with "I'm afraid that everything will disappear". The woman assures him "Just trust me" as the camera zooms in on Jimin "looking forlorn in a kitchen singing, 'She's saying, baby, come and follow me/ There's not a bad thing here tonight'". An unseen hand then grabs and pulls him into a crowded dance floor of a nightclub, where he is shown walking in slow motion through the partygoers, taking shots, and crowd-surfing; he eventually ends up in a "spooky hallway" with walls that ooze a "viscous black" goo. The rest of the visual fluctuates between Jimin partying in the nightclub and singing the song in a "freaky, Transformer-like rest room", and ends with him alone at the kitchen table once again, his right hand now covered in the "mysterious goo", which he then smears across the camera.

== Accolades ==
Jimin achieved four first place wins on domestic television music shows with "Like Crazy". He won on the March 30 and March 31, 2023, episodes of M Countdown and Music Bank respectively, both times against "Love Me Like This" by Nmixx, then again on the April 6 and 7 episodes respectively, beating "Flower" by Jisoo. The singer also won four consecutive weekly Melon Popularity awards.

"Like Crazy" was later nominated in the Best Music (Spring) category at 2023 Fact Music Awards, but did not win. That October, it received nominations for Best Dance Performance – Male Solo and Song of the Year at the MAMA Awards, and for Top Global K-Pop Song and Top Selling Song at the Billboard Music Awards. In December, it was nominated in the Digital Song category at the upcoming Golden Disc Awards, and the Global Streaming category at the Circle Chart Music Awards.

Year-end lists for "Like Crazy"
Critic/Publication	List	Rank	Ref.
Dazed	Top 50 best K-pop tracks of 2023	43	
Grammy	15 K-Pop Songs That Took 2023 By Storm	N/A	

== Track listing ==
- CD and digital single
1. "Like Crazy" – 3:32
- Digital – Remixes EP
1. "Like Crazy" – 3:32
2. "Like Crazy" (English version) – 3:32
3. "Like Crazy" (deep house remix) – 3:00
4. "Like Crazy" (UK garage remix) – 3:30
5. "Like Crazy" (instrumental) – 3:32

== Charts ==
=== Weekly charts ===
Weekly chart performance
Chart (2023–2024)	Peak position
Argentina Hot 100 (Billboard)	86
Australia (ARIA)	23
Austria (Ö3 Austria Top 40)	23
Bolivia (Billboard)	3
Canada Hot 100 (Billboard)	21
Croatia (Billboard)	17
France (SNEP)	83
Germany (GfK)	71
Global 200 (Billboard)	2
Greece International (IFPI)	37
Greece International (IFPI) English version	64
Hong Kong (Billboard)	10
Hungary (Single Top 40)	3
India International Singles (IMI)	2
Indonesia (Billboard)	3
Ireland (IRMA)	23
Italy (FIMI)	93
Japan Hot 100 (Billboard)	43
Japan Combined Singles (Oricon)	42
Lithuania (AGATA)	37
Lithuania (AGATA) English version	63
Malaysia (Billboard)	3
Malaysia International (RIM)	4
MENA (IFPI)	1
Netherlands (Single Tip)	4
New Zealand (Recorded Music NZ)	36
Peru (Billboard)	3
Philippines (Billboard)	7
Portugal (AFP)	34
Romania (Billboard)	13
Saudi Arabia (IFPI)	8
Singapore (RIAS)	2
South Korea (Circle)	8
Sweden Heatseeker (Sverigetopplistan)	15
Switzerland (Schweizer Hitparade)	27
Taiwan (Billboard)	7
UK Singles (Official Charts)	8
US Billboard Hot 100	1
US World Digital Song Sales (Billboard)	1
Vietnam (Vietnam Hot 100)	1

=== Monthly charts ===
Monthly chart performance
Chart (2023)	Position
South Korea (Circle)	12

=== Year-end charts ===
Year-end chart performance
Chart (2023)	Position
Brazil Streaming (Pro-Música Brasil)	181
Global 200 (Billboard)	61
South Korea (Circle)	70
US Digital Song Sales (Billboard)	5

Year-end chart performance
Chart (2024)	Position
Global 200 (Billboard)	154

== Certifications and sales ==
Certifications and sales
Region	Certification	Certified units/sales
Canada (Music Canada)	Platinum	80,000^{‡}
Japan	—	3,308
New Zealand (RMNZ)	Gold	15,000^{‡}
Spain (Promusicae)	Gold	30,000^{‡}
United Kingdom (BPI)	Silver	200,000^{‡}
United States (RIAA)	Platinum	1,000,000^{‡}
^{‡} Sales+streaming figures based on certification alone.

== Release history ==
Release dates and formats
Region	Date	Format	Version	Label	Ref.
United States	March 23, 2023	CD single	Original	Big Hit	
Various	March 24, 2023	Digital download; streaming	Original; English	Big Hit	
Various	March 26, 2023	Digital download; streaming	Deep House remix; UK Garage remix; instrumental	Big Hit	
Various	March 26, 2023	Digital download; streaming	Remixes	Big Hit	
Italy	March 31, 2023	Radio airplay	English	Universal	
