= List of songs written by Suga =

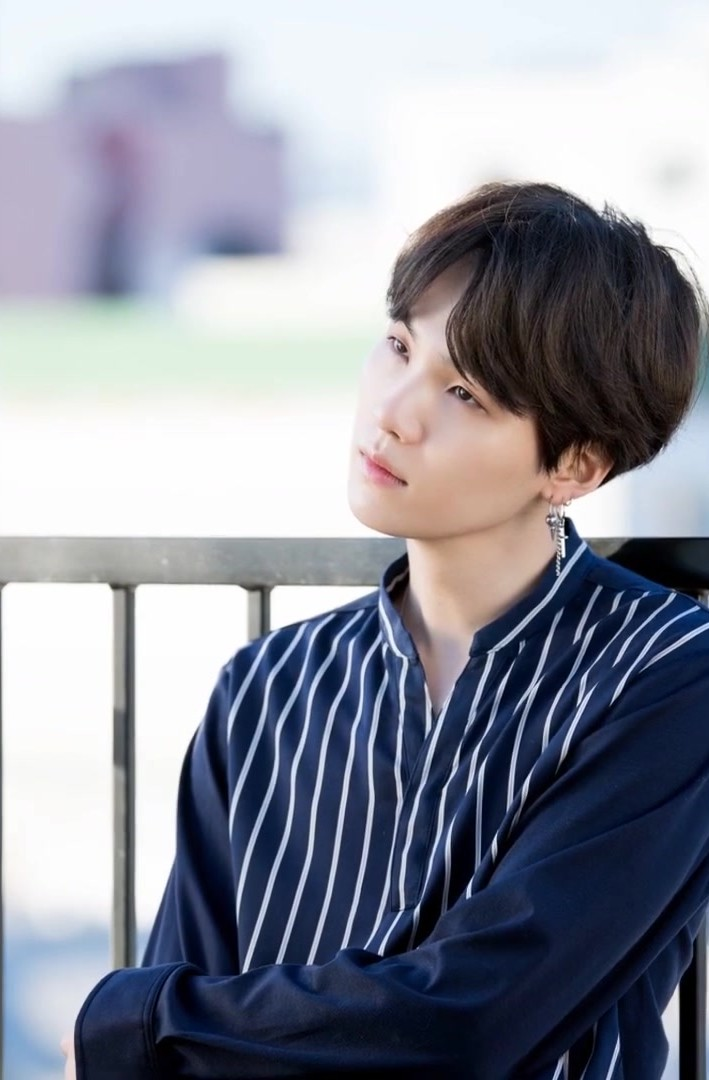
Suga for D Icon magazine, November 2017

South Korean rapper Min Yoon-gi, better known by his stage names Suga and Agust D, has written songs for his two solo mixtapes and debut studio album, multiple albums for BTS, as well as for other artists and one webcomic soundtrack. He debuted as a member of the South Korean septet BTS under Big Hit Entertainment in 2013 and rose to prominence as a songwriter for the group, co-writing many of their releases with bandmates RM and J-Hope. Several of these received nominations at various domestic and international award shows, including "Spring Day", which won Song of the Year at the 2017 Melon Music Awards, and "Boy with Luv", which won Song of the Year at the 2019 Melon Music Awards and Mnet Asian Music Awards. In December 2020, Suga made his debut on Billboard's Hot 100 Songwriters Chart at number nine, alongside RM, for their work on the group's fifth Korean-language studio album Be. It debuted at number one on the Billboard 200 while seven of its eight tracks, five of which he co-wrote, simultaneously debuted on the Hot 100 singles chart, including "Life Goes On", which became the first primarily Korean-language song to debut atop the ranking.

Suga wrote all of the songs for both of his self-produced solo mixtapes Agust D and D-2, released in 2016 and 2020 respectively. The titular lead single from the rapper's first mixtape discussed his success and identity, while the secondary single "Give It to Me" was a diss track addressing "those who would like to see him fail". For his second mixtape, co-writers on the album included Ghstloop, El Capitxn, and longtime Big Hit producer Pdogg. While D-2 contained Suga's trademark "raw sensibility and brutal honesty" also found on Agust D, the record was more "unapologetic yet humble". The lead single "Daechwita", co-written with El Capitxn, was an "anthem of victory and pride" about Suga's growth and "global success as an artist", and featured various South Korean historical and cultural references. It gained attention for combining elements of traditional Korean music with rap and trap beats. According to Suga, the project was a documentation of his rise from nothing to being "at the top of the global music game" at age 28. Heavily impacted by the COVID-19 pandemic, he called the body of songs the "output of my time in quarantine".

Promoted to a full member of the Korea Music Copyright Association (KOMCA) in January 2018, 169 songs have been attributed to Suga as a writer and composer as of May 2024. Some of his works for other artists include Suran's "Wine", which won Best Soul/R&B Track of the Year at the 2017 Melon Music Awards; Lee So-ra's "Song Request", in which he also featured; the co-produced "Eternal Sunshine (새벽에)" from Epik High's Sleepless in EP (2019); and Psy's "That That", which he co-wrote, co-composed, co-produced, and featured in.

== Songs ==
Key
†	Indicates single
#	Indicates a non-commercial release
‡	Indicates songs written solely by Suga

Song title, original artist, album of release, and year of release
Song	Artist(s)	Writer(s)	Album	Year	Ref.
"134340"	BTS	Suga, RM, J-Hope, Pdogg, Adora, Bobby Chung, Martin Luke Brown, Orla Gartland	Love Yourself: Tear	2018	
"140503 at dawn" (140503 새벽에)	Agust D (Note: Suga works under the alias "Agust D" for his mixtapes.)	Agust D, Slow Rabbit	Agust D	2016	
"2.0"	BTS	Williams, Hogan, Atia Boggs, Hinshaw, RM, J-Hope, V, Jung Kook, Mitchell, Milano, Pdogg, Suga	Arirang	2026	
"24/7=Heaven"	BTS	Suga, Slow Rabbit, Rap Monster, J-Hope, Pdogg	Dark & Wild	2014	
"28" (점점 어른이 되나봐)	Agust D feat. NiiHWA	Agust D, El Capitxn, Hiss Noise	D-2	2020	
"2nd Grade"	BTS	Suga, Supreme Boi, Rap Monster, J-Hope, Pdogg	Dark & Wild	2014	
"724148" ‡ (치리사일사팔)	Agust D	Agust D	Agust D	2016	
"A Supplementary Story: You Never Walk Alone"	BTS	Suga, Supreme Boi, Rap Monster, J-Hope, "Hitman" Bang, Pdogg	You Never Walk Alone	2017	
"Adult Child" #	Suga, , Jin	Suga, Rap Monster	Non-album single	2013	
"Agust D" (Note: contains a sample of James Brown's "It's a Man's Man's Man's World") ‡ †	Agust D	Agust D	Agust D	2016	
"Airplane Pt. 2"	BTS	Suga, Rap Monster, J-Hope, "Hitman" Bang, Pdogg, Ali Tamposi, Roman Campolo, Liza Owens	Love Yourself: Tear	2018	
"Aliens"	BTS	Michael Williams II, Rap Monster, Asheton Hogan, Brandon Bell, Khaled Rohaim, Charles Hinshaw, Jean Marcel Day Jr., James Essein, J-Hope, Jung Kook, Suga, John Mitchell, Milano, Pdogg	Arirang	2026	
"All Night"	BTS feat. Juice Wrld	Suga, Rap Monster, Powers Pleasant, Juice Wrld, Marric Strobert	BTS World: Original Soundtrack	2019	
"Amygdala"	Agust D	Agust D, El Capitxn	D-Day	2023	
"Anpanman"	BTS	Suga, Supreme Boi, Rap Monster, "Hitman" Bang, Pdogg, Jinbo	Love Yourself: Tear	2018	
"Answer: Love Myself"	BTS	Suga, RRap Monster, J-Hope, Pdogg, Bobby Chung, Ray Michael Djan Jr., Ashton Foster, DJ Swivel, Candace Nicole Sosa, Conor Maynard	Love Yourself: Answer	2018	
"Attack on Bangtan"	BTS	Suga, Supreme Boi, Rap Monster, J-Hope, Pdogg	O!RUL8,2?	2013	
"Attack on Bangtan" (Japanese version)	BTS	Suga, Supreme Boi, Rap Monster, J-Hope, Pdogg	Wake Up	2014	
"Best of Me"	BTS	Suga, "Hitman" Bang, J-Hope, Rap Monster, (Note: RM changed his name from "Rap Monster" to "RM" in 2017. This was one of his first works to be credited under the new name.) Pdogg, Andrew Taggart, Ray Michael Djan Jr., Ashton Foster, Adora, Sam Klempner	Love Yourself: Her	2017	
"Best of Me" (Japanese ver.)	BTS	Suga, Andrew Taggart, Pdogg, Ray Michael Djan Jr., Ashton Foster, Sam Klempner, Rap Monster, "Hitman" Bang, J-Hope, Adora	Face Yourself	2018	
"Blanket Kick"	BTS	Suga, Slow Rabbit, Shaun, Rap Monster, J-Hope, "Hitman" Bang, Pdogg	Dark & Wild	2014	
"Blood Sweat & Tears" †	BTS	Suga, Pdogg, Rap Monster, J-Hope, "Hitman" Bang, Kim Do-hoon	Wings; Proof	2016	
"Blood Sweat & Tears" (Japanese ver.) †	BTS	Suga, "Hitman" Bang, J-Hope, Pdogg, Kim Do-hoon, RM	Face Yourself	2018	
"Blue & Grey"	BTS	Suga, RM, J-Hope, V, Hiss Noise, Levi, Metaphor, Park Ji-soo	Be	2020	
"Blueberry Eyes"	MAX	Suga, MAX, Rogét Chahayed, Imad Royal, Michael Pollack	Colour Vision	2020	
"Body to Body"	BTS	Ryan Tedder, Maxime Picard, Thomas Pentz, Akira Evans, Teezo Touchdown, Pdogg, RM, Suga, J-Hope, Kirsten Spencer	Arirang	2026	
"Born Singer" (Note: samples "Born Sinner" from J. Cole's 2013 album of the same name)	BTS	Suga, Jermaine Cole, James Fauntleroy II, Anthony Parrino, Canei Finch, Juro "Mez" Davis, Ibrahim Hamad, RM, J-Hope	Proof	2022	
"Boy In Luv" †	BTS	Suga, Supreme Boi, Rap Monster, "Hitman" Bang, Pdogg	Skool Luv Affair; Proof	2014	
"Boy In Luv" (Demo version)	BTS	Suga, Supreme Boi, RM, "Hitman" Bang, Pdogg	Proof	2022	
"Boy In Luv" (Japanese version) †	BTS	Suga, Supreme Boi, Rap Monster, "Hitman" Bang, Pdogg, KM-MARKIT	Wake Up	2014	
"Boy with Luv" †	BTS feat. Halsey	Suga, RM, Pdogg, J-Hope, "Hitman" Bang, Melanie Joy Fontana, Michel "Lindgren" Schulz, Halsey, Emily Weisband	Map of the Soul: Persona; Proof	2019	
"Boyz with Fun" (흥탄소년단)	BTS	Suga, Rap Monster, J-Hope, V, Jimin, Jin, "Hitman" Bang, Pdogg	The Most Beautiful Moment in Life, Pt. 1	2015	
"Boyz with Fun" (Demo ver.)	BTS	Suga, "Hitman" Bang, J-Hope, Pdogg, RM, Jin, V, Jimin	Proof	2022	
"Boyz With Fun" (Japanese Version) (フンタン少年団)	BTS	Suga, "Hitman" Bang, J-Hope, Pdogg, Rap Monster, Jin, V, Jimin	Youth	2016	
"BTS Cypher Pt. 1"	BTS	Suga, Supreme Boi, Rap Monster, J-Hope	O!RUL8,2?	2013	
"BTS Cypher Pt. 2: Triptych"	BTS	Suga, Supreme Boi, Rap Monster, J-Hope	Skool Luv Affair	2014	
"BTS Cypher Pt. 3: Killer"	BTS feat. Supreme Boi	Suga, Supreme Boi, Rap Monster, J-Hope	Dark & Wild; Proof	2014	
"BTS Cypher Pt. 4"	BTS	Suga, Chris 'Tricky' Stewart, Medor J. Pierre, Rap Monster, J-Hope	Wings	2016	
"Burn It"	Agust D feat. MAX	Agust D, Ghstloop, MAX, AM!R	D-2	2020	
"Butterfly"	BTS	Suga, Slow Rabbit, "Hitman" Bang, Pdogg, Brother Su, Rap Monster, J-Hope	The Most Beautiful Moment in Life, Pt. 2	2015	
"Butterfly" (Alternative Mix)	BTS	Suga, "Hitman" Bang, Slow Rabbit, Pdogg, Brother Su, Rap Monster, J-Hope	The Most Beautiful Moment in Life: Young Forever	2016	
"Butterfly" (Japanese ver.)	BTS	Suga, "Hitman" Bang, Pdogg, Brother Su, Slow Rabbit, Rap Monster, J-Hope	Youth	2016	
"Coffee"	BTS	Suga, Slow Rabbit, Rap Monster, J-Hope, Pdogg, Urban Zakapa	O!RUL8,2?	2013	
"Converse High"	BTS	Suga, Slow Rabbit, Rap Monster, J-Hope, Pdogg	The Most Beautiful Moment in Life, Pt. 1	2015	
"Come Over"	BTS	Henry Walter, Joshua Coleman, Suga, Jacob Kasher Hindlin, Hein, RM, J-Hope	Arirang	2026	
"Could You Turn off Your Cellphone?"	BTS	Suga, Rap Monster, J-Hope, Pdogg	Dark & Wild	2014	
"D-Day"	Agust D	Agust D, Vincent "Invisible" Watson, 2Live	D-Day	2023	
"Daechwita" † (대취타)	Agust D	Agust D, El Capitxn	D-2	2020	
"Danger" †	BTS	Suga, Rap Monster, J-Hope, "Hitman" Bang, Pdogg, Thanh Bui	Dark & Wild; Proof	2014	
"Danger" (Japanese version)" †	BTS	Suga, Rap Monster, J-Hope, "Hitman" Bang, Pdogg, Thanh Bui, KM-MARKIT	Wake Up	2014	
"Ddaeng" # (땡)	Suga, RM, J-Hope	Suga, RM, J.Pearl, J-Hope	Non-album single	2018	
"Dead Leaves"	BTS	Suga, Slow Rabbit, Rap Monster, J-Hope, Jungkook, "Hitman" Bang, Pdogg	The Most Beautiful Moment in Life, Pt. 2	2015	
"Dear My Friend" (어땠을까)	Agust D feat. Kim Jong Wan	Agust D, El Capitxn, Kim Jong Wan	D-2	2020	
"Dionysus"	BTS	Suga, Supreme Boi, RM, J-Hope, Pdogg, Roman Campolo	Map of the Soul: Persona	2019	
"Dis-ease"	BTS	Suga, RM, J-Hope, Jimin, Ghstloop, Pdogg, Ivan Jackson Rosenberg, Randy Runyon	Be	2020	
"DNA" †	BTS	Suga, "Hitman" Bang, Supreme Boi, RM, Pdogg, KASS	Love Yourself: Her; Proof	2017	
"DNA" (Japanese ver.) †	BTS	Suga, Pdogg, "Hitman" Bang, Supreme Boi, KASS, RM	Face Yourself	2018	
"DNA" (Pedal 2 LA Mix)	BTS	Suga, Supreme Boi, RM, KASS, "Hitman" Bang, Pdogg	Love Yourself: Answer	2018	
"Dope" †	BTS	Suga, Rap Monster, J-Hope, "Hitman" Bang, Gwis Bang Mang, Slow Rabbit, Pdogg	The Most Beautiful Moment in Life, Pt. 1	2015	
"Dope" (Japanese ver.)	BTS	Suga, Ahn Tae Seok, Gwis Bang Mang, "Hitman" Bang, J-Hope, Pdogg, Rap Monster	Youth	2016	
"Eight" † (에잇)	IU prod. and feat. Suga of BTS	Suga, IU	Non-album single	2020	
"Epilogue: Young Forever" †	BTS	Suga, Slow Rabbit, Rap Monster, J-Hope, "Hitman" Bang	The Most Beautiful Moment in Life: Young Forever	2016	
"Epilogue: Young Forever" (Japanese ver.)	BTS	Suga, "Hitman" Bang, J-Hope, Rap Monster, Slow Rabbit	Youth	2016	
"Fire" †	BTS	Suga, Rap Monster, Han Sang-hee, "Hitman" Bang, Pdogg, Devine Channel	The Most Beautiful Moment in Life: Young Forever; Proof	2016	
"Fire" (Japanese ver.)	BTS	Suga, "Hitman" Bang, Han Sang-hee, Lim Kwang-wook, Devine Channel, Pdogg, Rap Monster	Youth	2016	
"First Love"	BTS (Note: credited to BTS but is a solo track by Suga)	Suga, Miss Kay	Wings	2016	
"Fly to My Room"	BTS	Suga, RM, J-Hope, Joe Femi Griffith, Cosmo's Midnight	Be	2020	
"For You" †	BTS	Suga, HIRO, J-Hope, Pdogg, Rap Monster, UTA	Youth	2016	
"For Youth"	BTS	Suga, RM, Imad Royal, Rogét Chahayed, Blaise Railey, Drew Love, 4rest, J-Hope, Hiss Noise, Slow Rabbit, "Hitman" Bang	Proof	2022	
"FYA"	BTS	Harley Streten, Gregory Aldae Hein, JPEGMafia, Pentz, Kurtis Wells, RM, Jung Kook, Richard Mears IV, Suga	Arirang	2026	
"Girl of My Dreams"	Juice Wrld with Suga of BTS	Suga, Juice Wrld, Max Lord, Jagvir Aujla, Karim El-Ziftawi, Joshua Jaramillo	Fighting Demons	2021	
"Give It To Me" ‡ †	Agust D	Agust D	Agust D	2016	
"Good Day"	BTS	Suga, Matt Cab, J-Hope, Rap Monster, Ryuja	Youth	2016	
"Haegeum" ‡ † (해금)	Agust D	Agust D	D-Day	2023	
"Hip Hop Phile"	BTS	Suga, Rap Monster, J-Hope, Pdogg	Dark & Wild	2014	
"Hold Me Tight"	BTS	Suga, Slow Rabbit, Pdogg, V, Rap Monster, J-Hope, Kim Beon-chang	The Most Beautiful Moment in Life, Pt. 1	2015	
"Home"	BTS	Suga, RM, J-Hope, Adora, Bobby Chung, Pdogg, Song Jae-kyung, Lauren Dyson, Tushar Apte, Krysta Youngs, Julia Ross	Map of the Soul: Persona	2019	
"Honsool" (혼술)	Agust D	Agust D, Pdogg	D-2	2020	
"Hooligan"	BTS	Pablo Diaz Reixa, Michel Magne, Pablo Martinez Alborch, Marcus Lomax, Xplicit, Jung Kook, Delacey, Jasper Harris, RM, J-Hope, Suga, Derrick Milano, Pdogg, Spencer	Arirang	2026	
"Huh?!"	Agust D feat. J-Hope	Agust D, El Capitxn, J-Hope	D-Day	2023	
"I Like It"	BTS	Suga, Slow Rabbit, Rap Monster, J-Hope	2 Cool 4 Skool	2013	
"I Like It" (Japanese version)	BTS	Suga, Slow Rabbit, Rap Monster, J-Hope	Wake Up	2014	
"I Like It" (Slow Jam Remix)	BTS	Suga, Slow Rabbit, Rap Monster, J-Hope, Pdogg, Brother Su	Skool Luv Affair Special Addition	2014	
"I Like It Pt. 2"	BTS	Suga, Slow Rabbit, Rap Monster, J-Hope	Wake Up	2014	
"I Need U" †	BTS	Suga, Rap Monster, "Hitman" Bang, Pdogg, Brother Su, J-Hope	The Most Beautiful Moment in Life, Pt. 1 Proof	2015	
"I Need U" (Demo ver.)	BTS	Suga, Pdogg, "Hitman" Bang, Brother Su, RM, J-Hope	Proof	2022	
"I Need U" (Japanese ver.) †	BTS	Suga, "Hitman" Bang, Brother Su, Rap Monster, J-Hope	Youth	2016	
"I'm Fine"	BTS	Suga, Yoon Kita, RM, J-Hope, Bobby Chung, Pdogg, Lauren Dyson, Ray Michael Djan Jr., Ashton Foster, DJ Swivel, Candace Nicole Sosa, Samantha Harper	Love Yourself: Answer	2018	
"If I Ruled the World"	BTS	Suga, Rap Monster, Pdogg, J-Hope	O!RUL8,2?	2013	
"In the Soop" #	BTS	Suga, RM, J-Hope, V, Jimin, Jungkook, Jin	Non-album single	2020	
"Interlude: Dawn"	Agust D	Agust D, El Capitxn	D-Day	2023	
"Interlude: Dream, Reality"	Agust D	Agust D, Slow Rabbit	Agust D	2016	
"Interlude: Set Me Free"	Agust D	Agust D, Pdogg	D-2	2020	
"Interlude: Shadow"	BTS	Suga, RM, El Capitxn, Ghstloop, Pdogg	Map of the Soul: 7	2020	
"Interlude: Wings"	BTS	Suga, Pdogg, Adora, Rap Monster, J-Hope	Wings	2016	
"Into the Sun"	BTS	Pdogg, Pentz, V, Jimin, Touchdown, Ki-An Dee Kambaran, Mears, Tyler Johnson, Ghstloop, RM, Suga, J-Hope	Arirang	2026	
"Intro: Dt sugA"	Agust D feat. DJ Friz	Agust D, Pdogg	Agust D	2016	
"Intro: Never Mind"	BTS	Suga, Slow Rabbit, Rap Monster, J-Hope	The Most Beautiful Moment in Life, Pt. 2	2015	
"Intro: Ringwanderung"	BTS	Suga, Adora, "Hitman" Bang, Ray Michael Djan Jr., Ashton Foster, J-Hope, Pdogg, RM, Sam Klempner, Andrew Taggart, UTA	Face Yourself	2018	
"Intro: Skool Luv Affair"	BTS	Suga, Slow Rabbit, Rap Monster, J-Hope, Pdogg	Skool Luv Affair	2014	
"Intro: The Most Beautiful Moment in Life" (Intro: 화양연화)	BTS	Suga, Slow Rabbit	The Most Beautiful Moment in Life, Pt. 1	2015	
"Introduction: Youth"	BTS	Suga, Rap Monster, "Hitman" Bang, Pdogg, V, Jungkook, J-Hope, UTA, HIRO, Brother Su, Devine Channel	Youth	2016	
"Jump"	BTS	Suga, Supreme Boi, Rap Monster, J-Hope, Pdogg	Skool Luv Affair	2014	
"Jump" (Demo Version)	BTS	Suga, Pdogg, Rap Monster, Supreme Boi	Proof	2022	
"Jump" (Japanese version)	BTS	Suga, Supreme Boi, Rap Monster, J-Hope, Pdogg	Wake Up	2014	
"Just One Day" †	BTS	Suga, Rap Monster, J-Hope, Pdogg	Skool Luv Affair	2014	
"Just One Day" (extended Japanese version)	BTS	Suga, Rap Monster, J-Hope, Pdogg	Wake Up	2014	
"Let Me Know"	BTS	Suga, Rap Monster, J-Hope, Pdogg	Dark & Wild	2014	
"Life Goes On" †	BTS	Suga, RM, J-Hope, Pdogg, Antonina Armato, Christopher Brenner, Ruuth	Be; Proof	2020	
"Life Goes On"	Agust D	Agust D, El Capitxn, Blvsh, RM, J-Hope, Pdogg, Antonina Armato, Christopher Brenner	D-Day	2023	
"Lilith" (Diablo IV Anthem) †	Halsey feat. Suga of BTS	Suga, Halsey, Atticus Ross, Johnathan Carter Cunningham, Trent Reznor	Non-album single	2023	
"Look Here"	BTS	Suga, Rap Monster, J-Hope, Jinbo, Lee Ho-hyoung	Dark & Wild	2014	
"Louder Than Bombs"	BTS	Suga, RM, J-Hope, Allie X, Bram Inscore, Leland, Troye Sivan	Map of the Soul: 7	2020	
"Love Is Not Over" (Full Length Edition)	BTS	Suga, Slow Rabbit, Jungkook, Jin, Pdogg, Rap Monster, J-Hope	The Most Beautiful Moment in Life: Young Forever	2016	
"Love Maze"	BTS	Suga, Yoon Kita, RM, J-Hope, Adora, Bobby Chung, Pdogg, DJ Swivel, Candace Nicole Sosa	Love Yourself: Tear	2018	
"Ma City"	BTS	Suga, Rap Monster, J-Hope, "Hitman" Bang, Pdogg	The Most Beautiful Moment in Life, Pt. 2	2015	
"Magic Shop"	BTS	Suga, RM, J-Hope, Jungkook, Adora, Hiss noise, DJ Swivel, Candace Nicole Sosa	Love Yourself: Tear	2018	
"Make It Right" †	BTS	Suga, RM, J-Hope, Ed Sheeran, Fred Gibson, Jo Hill, Benjamin Gibson	Map of the Soul: Persona	2019	
"Merry Go Round"	BTS	Sam Homaee, Sarah Aarons, Hein, Kevin Parker, RM, Suga, J-Hope, Milano, Pdogg	Arirang	2026	
"Mikrokosmos"	BTS	Suga, RM, J-Hope, Melanie Joy Fontana, Michel "Lindgren" Schulz, DJ Swivel, Candace Nicole Sosa, Marcus McCoan, Matty Thomson, Max Lynedoch Graham, Ryan Lawrie, Camilla Reynolds	Map of the Soul: Persona	2019	
"Miss Right"	BTS	Suga, Slow Rabbit, Rap Monster, J-Hope, "Hitman" Bang, Pdogg	Skool Luv Affair Special Addition	2014	
"Moonlight" (저 달)	Agust D	Agust D, Ghstloop	D-2	2020	
"Moving On"	BTS	Suga, Rap Monster, J-Hope, Pdogg	The Most Beautiful Moment in Life, Pt. 1	2015	
"My Universe" †	Coldplay x BTS	Suga, RM, J-Hope, Oscar Holter, Guy Berryman, Jonny Buckland, Will Champion, Chris Martin, Max Martin, Bill Rhako	Music of the Spheres	2021	
"My Universe" (SUGA's Remix)	Coldplay x BTS	Suga, RM, J-Hope, Oscar Holter, Guy Berryman, Jonny Buckland, Will Champion, Chris Martin, Max Martin, Bill Rhako	Music of the Spheres (Digital deluxe edition)	2021	
"N.O" †	BTS	Suga, Supreme Boi, Rap Monster, "Hitman" Bang, Pdogg	O!RUL8,2? Proof	2013	
"N.O." (Japanese version)	BTS	Suga, Supreme Boi, Rap Monster, "Hitman" Bang, Pdogg	Wake Up	2014	
"No More Dream" †	BTS	Suga, Supreme Boi, Rap Monster, J-Hope, "Hitman" Bang, Pdogg, Jungkook	2 Cool 4 Skool; Proof	2013	
"No More Dream" (Japanese version) †	BTS	Suga, Supreme Boi, Rap Monster, J-Hope, "Hitman" Bang, Pdogg	Wake Up	2014	
"Normal"	BTS	Foreman, Livvi Franc, Tedder, Sean Cook, RM, J-Hope, Suga, Spencer, Milano, Pdogg	Arirang	2026	
"On" †	BTS	Suga, RM, J-Hope, Pdogg, Antonina Armato, Melanie Joy Fontana, August Rigo, Michel "Lindgren" Schulz, Krysta Youngs, Julia Ross	Map of the Soul: 7 Proof	2020	
"On"	BTS feat. Sia	Suga, RM, J-Hope, Pdogg, Antonina Armato, Melanie Joy Fontana, August Rigo, Michel "Lindgren" Schulz, Krysta Youngs, Julia Ross	Map of the Soul: 7	2020	
"One More Night"	BTS	Pentz, Pdogg, Nox, Mears, RM, Suga, J-Hope, Ant Clemons	Arirang	2026	
"Otsukare" #	Suga & J-Hope	Suga, J-Hope, Miss Kay, Pdogg, Fujibayashi Shoko	Non-album single	2016	
"Outro: Circle Room Cypher"	BTS	Suga, Rap Monster, J-Hope, V, Jimin, Jungkook, Jin, Pdogg	2 Cool 4 Skool	2013	
"Outro: Her"	BTS	Suga, J-Hope, Slow Rabbit, RM	Love Yourself: Her; Love Yourself: Answer; Proof	2017	
"Outro: Tear"	BTS	Suga, RM, J-Hope, DOCSKIM, Shin Myung-soo	Love Yourself: Tear; Love Yourself: Answer	2018	
"Outro: Wings"	BTS	Suga, Rap Monster, J-Hope, Adora, Pdogg	You Never Walk Alone	2017	
"Paradise"	BTS	Suga, RM, J-Hope, Song Jae-kyung, MNEK, Lophiile	Love Yourself: Tear	2018	
"Path"	BTS	Suga, Rap Monster, J-Hope, "Hitman" Bang, Pdogg	2 Cool 4 Skool	2013	
"People" (사람)	Agust D	Agust D, Pdogg	D-2	2020	
"People Pt. 2" (사람 Pt. 2)	Agust D feat. IU	Agust D, El Capitxn	D-Day	2023	
"Pied Piper"	BTS	Suga, Jinbo, "Hitman" Bang, J-Hope, RM, Pdogg, KASS	Love Yourself: Her	2017	
"Please"	BTS	Spry, Essein, Tedder, RM, Suga, J-Hope	Arirang	2026	
"Polar Night" (극야)	Agust D	Agust D, El Capitxn, Kang Seung-won	D-Day	2023	
"Rain"	BTS	Suga, Slow Rabbit, Rap Monster, J-Hope	Dark & Wild	2014	
"Respect"	BTS	Suga, RM, El Capitxn, Hiss Noise	Map of the Soul: 7	2020	
"Run" †	BTS	Suga, Rap Monster, J-Hope, V, Jungkook, "Hitman" Bang, Pdogg	The Most Beautiful Moment in Life, Pt. 2 Proof	2015	
"Run" (Alternative Mix)	BTS	Suga, Pdogg, "Hitman" Bang, Rap Monster, V, Jungkook, J-Hope	The Most Beautiful Moment in Life: Young Forever	2016	
"Run" (Ballad Mix)	BTS	Suga, Pdogg, "Hitman" Bang, Rap Monster, V, Jungkook, J-Hope	The Most Beautiful Moment in Life: Young Forever	2016	
"Run" (Japanese ver.) †	BTS	Suga, "Hitman" Bang, Jungkook, Pdogg, Rap Monster, V	Youth	2016	
"Run BTS" (달려라 방탄)	BTS	Suga, Dwayne Abernathy Jr., RM, Ebenezer, J-Hope, Ghstloop, Jungkook, Oneye (Pontus Kalm), Daniel Caesar, Ludwig Lindell, Melanie Joy Fontana, Michel "Lindgren" Schulz, Feli Ferraro	Proof	2022	
"Satoori Rap"	BTS	Suga, Rap Monster, J-Hope, Pdogg	O!RUL8,2?	2013	
"Savage Love (Laxed – Siren Beat) [BTS Remix]"	Jawsh 685, Jason Derulo, BTS	Suga, J-Hope, Jawsh 685, Jacob Kasher, Jason Derulo, Phil Greiss	Non-album single	2020	
"Save Me" †	BTS	Suga, Rap Monster, J-Hope, Pdogg, Ray Michael Djan Jr., Ashton Foster, Samantha Harper	The Most Beautiful Moment in Life: Young Forever	2016	
"Save Me" (Japanese ver.)	BTS	Suga, Ashton Foster, J-Hope, Pdogg, Rap Monster, Ray Michael Djan Jr., Samantha Harper	Youth	2016	
"SDL"	Agust D	Agust D, El Capitxn	D-Day	2023	
"Sea"	BTS	Suga, J-Hope, Slow Rabbit, RM	Love Yourself: Her	2017	
"Seesaw" (Demo Version) ‡	BTS	Suga	Proof	2022	
"Seesaw X I NEED U" (Remix) #	BTS	Suga, Rap Monster, "Hitman" Bang, Pdogg, Brother Su, J-Hope, Slow Rabbit	Non-album single	2018	
"Skit" ‡	Agust D	Agust D	Agust D	2016	
"Skit"	BTS	Suga, Jin, RM, J-Hope, Jimin, Jungkook, V	Be	2020	
"Snooze"	Agust D feat. Ryuichi Sakamoto, Kim Woo-sung	Agust D, El Capitxn, Ryuichi Sakamoto, Kim Woo-sung	D-Day	2023	
"So Far Away"	Agust D feat. Suran	Agust D, Slow Rabbit	Agust D	2016	
"So What"	BTS	Suga, RM, J-Hope, Adora, "Hitman" Bang, Pdogg	Love Yourself: Tear	2018	
"Song Request" †	Lee So-ra	Suga, Tablo	Non-album single	2019	
"Spine Breaker"	BTS	Suga, Slow Rabbit, Supreme Boi, OWO, Rap Monster, J-Hope, Song Chang-sik, Pdogg	Skool Luv Affair	2014	
"Spring Day" †	BTS	Suga, Rap Monster, Adora, "Hitman" Bang, Pdogg, Peter Ibsen, Arlissa Ruppert	You Never Walk Alone; Proof	2017	
"Spring Day" (Brit Rock Remix) #	BTS	Suga, Pdogg, RM, Adora, "Hitman" Bang, Arlissa Ruppert, Peter Ibsen	Non-album single	2018	
"Spring Day" (Japanese ver.)	BTS	Suga, "Hitman" Bang, Peter Ibsen, Pdogg, RM, Adora, Arlissa Ruppert	Face Yourself	2018	
"Stay Alive"	Jungkook prod. Suga of BTS	Suga, El Capitxn, Maria Marcus, Louise Frick Sveen, Gabriel Brandes, Matt Thomson, Max Lynedoch Graham	Non-album single	2022	
"Strange" (이상하지 않은가)	Agust D feat. RM	Agust D, RM, El Capitxn, Ghstloop	D-2	2020	
"Suga's Interlude"	Halsey with Suga of BTS	Suga, Halsey, Pdogg, Lido	Manic	2019	
"Take Two"†	BTS	Suga, El Capitxn, RM, Gabriel Brandes, Matt Thomson, Max Lynedoch Graham, J-Hope, Nois Upgrader	Non-album single	2023	
"Telepathy"	BTS	Suga, RM, Jungkook, El Capitxn, Hiss Noise	Be	2020	
"That That" †	Psy prod. and feat. Suga of BTS	Suga, Psy	Psy 9th	2022	
"The Last" (마지막)	Agust D	Agust D, June, Pdogg	Agust D	2016	
"The Stars"	BTS	Suga, KM-MARKIT, Rap Monster, J-Hope, Pdogg	Wake Up	2014	
"They Don't Know 'bout Us"	BTS	Pdogg, Ghstloop, Ari Starrace, Rug, Wells, Jimin, RM, Suga, J-Hope	Arirang	2026	
"Tomorrow"	BTS	Suga, Slow Rabbit, Rap Monster, J-Hope	Skool Luv Affair	2014	
"Tony Montana"	Agust D feat. Jimin	Agust D, Pdogg	Proof	2022	
"Tony Montana"	Agust D feat. Yankie	Agust D, Pdogg	Agust D	2016	
"Trivia 轉: Seesaw"	BTS	Suga, Slow Rabbit	Love Yourself: Answer; Proof	2018	
"Two! Three! (Still Wishing For Better Days)"	BTS	Suga, Slow Rabbit, Pdogg, "Hitman" Bang, Rap Monster, J-Hope	Wings	2016	
"Ugh!"	BTS	Suga, Supreme Boi, RM, J-Hope, Hiss Noise, Icecream Drum	Map of the Soul: 7	2020	
"Wake Up"	BTS	Suga, Swing-O, Rap Monster, J-Hope, KM-MARKIT	Wake Up	2014	
"War of Hormone" †	BTS	Suga, Supreme Boi, Rap Monster, J-Hope, Pdogg	Dark & Wild	2014	
"We Are Bulletproof Pt. 2" †	BTS	Suga, Supreme Boi, Rap Monster, "Hitman" Bang, Pdogg	2 Cool 4 Skool	2013	
"We Are Bulletproof: The Eternal"	BTS	Suga, RM, J-Hope, Alexander Magnus Karlsson, Antonina Armato, Ellen Berg, Cazzi Opeia, Alexei Viktorovitch, DJ Swivel, Candace Nicole Sosa, Audien, Amelia Kate Woodward Toomey, Elohim, Etta Zelmani, Gusten Dahlqvist, Frances, Henrik Barman Michelsen, Wille Erik Hugo Tannergård, July Jones	Map of the Soul: 7	2020	
"We Don't Talk Together" †	Heize feat. Giriboy	Suga, Heize, Giriboy	Non-album single	2019	
"We On"	BTS	Suga, Rap Monster, Pdogg, J-Hope	O!RUL8,2?	2013	
"Whalien 52"	BTS	Suga, Slow Rabbit, Rap Monster, J-Hope, "Hitman" Bang, Pdogg, Brother Su	The Most Beautiful Moment in Life, Pt. 2	2015	
"What Do You Think?" (어떻게 생각해?)	Agust D	Agust D, El Capitxn, Ghstloop	D-2	2020	
"Where Did You Come From?"	BTS	Suga, Kwon Dae Hee, Cream, Rap Monster, J-Hope	Skool Luv Affair	2014	
"Wishing on a Star"	BTS	Suga, Rap Monster, J-Hope, Matt Cab, Willie Weeks, Daisuke	Youth	2016	
"Yet to Come (The Most Beautiful Moment)" †	BTS	Suga, Pdogg, RM, MAX, Dan Gleyzer, J-Hope	Proof	2022	
"You" †	ØMI prod. Suga of BTS	Suga, Park Shin-won, El Capitxn, UTA, Yohei	Answer... Shine	2021	

== See also ==
- List of songs produced by Suga
