= Suga discography =

- Suga for Marie Claire Korea, May 2023 issue
- Studio albums: 1
- Singles: 13
- Music videos: 10
- Mixtapes: 2

South Korean rapper Suga, also known as Agust D, has released one studio album, two mixtapes, and thirteen singles (including five as a featured artist and three promotional singles). He has collaborated with artists such as Suran, Lee So-ra, Halsey, IU, Max, Juice Wrld, and Psy.

Prior to joining Big Hit Entertainment in 2010, Suga was active as an underground rapper under the name Gloss. One of his earliest known songs is the track "518-062", which he wrote and produced in commemoration of the Gwangju Uprising. Initially signing on with the label as a producer, Suga eventually debuted as a member of BTS in June 2013. His first solo song for the group was "Intro: The Most Beautiful Moment in Life", the rap opening track from their third Korean-language extended play (EP) The Most Beautiful Moment in Life, Pt. 1 (2015), released as an animated video trailer on YouTube in April of that year. He has since written and performed four other solo songs in the band's discography: "Intro: Never Mind" from The Most Beautiful Moment in Life, Pt. 2 (2015), "First Love" from Wings (2016), "Trivia: Seesaw" from Love Yourself: Answer (2018), and "Interlude: Shadow" from Map of the Soul: 7 (2020).

The rapper continued working on solo music in between band-related commitments, ultimately developing the alter ego "Agust D" (derived from the initials DT, short for his birthplace Daegu Town, and "Suga" spelled backwards) as a medium for releasing music that did not have to take charts or trends into consideration. His first mixtape, the eponymous Agust D (2016), featured an angrier, more aggressive sound and style in comparison to his usual work for BTS. Two singles, "Agust D" and "Give It To Me", were released in promotion of the project, both accompanied by music videos. Initially a free release, the mixtape was made available commercially on download and streaming platforms in 2018. Four years later, the rapper put out his second mixtape D-2 (2020). The project's only single, "Daechwita", premiered the same day as the mixtape's release, also accompanied by a music video. Given a commercial release, the mixtape debuted at number 11 on the Billboard 200 in the United States, becoming the highest-charting release by a Korean solo artist in Billboard chart history at the time. In April 2023, Suga released his debut solo studio album D-Day as Agust D. Described as the third and possibly final installment in his Agust D trilogy of works, the record featured collaborations with BTS bandmate J-Hope, South Korean vocalist IU, Japanese composer Ryuichi Sakamoto, and indie rock singer Woosung of The Rose.

== Studio albums ==
List of studio albums with selected details, showing chart positions and sales
Title	Details	Peak chart positions										Sales	Certifications
Title	Details	KOR	AUS	CAN	FRA	GER	ITA	JPN	JPN Hot	US	US World	Sales	Certifications
D-Day	Released: April 21, 2023; Label: Big Hit; Format: CD, LP, digital download, streaming	1	4	9	1	3	7	2	2	2	1	KOR: 1,380,363; FRA: 8,252; JPN: 138,353; US: 122,000	KMCA: Million; RIAJ: Gold

== Mixtapes ==
List of mixtapes, showing selected details, chart positions, and sales
Title	Album details	Peak chart positions									Sales
Title	Album details	AUS	CAN	FIN	IRE	JPN	NOR	NZ	UK	US	Sales
Agust D	Released: August 15, 2016; Label: Big Hit; Format: Digital download, streaming	—	—	—	—	8	—	—	—	— (Note: Agust D did not enter the Billboard 200, but peaked at number five on the Heatseekers Albums chart and number three on the World Albums chart.)	JPN: 2,638
D-2	Released: May 22, 2020; Label: Big Hit; Format: Digital download, streaming	2	12	4	10	7	7	10	7	11	JPN: 6,040; US: 14,000
"—" denotes items which were not released in that country or failed to chart.

== Singles ==
=== As lead artist ===
List of singles as lead artist, showing year released, selected chart positions, sales, and album name
Title	Year	Peak chart positions										Sales	Album
Title	Year	KOR	CAN	HUN	JPN Dig.	NZ Hot	SCO (Note: The Scottish Singles Chart was discontinued the week ending November 20, 2020.)	UK	US	US World	WW	Sales	Album
"Agust D"	2016	—	—	—	—	—	—	—	—	6	—		Agust D
"Give It to Me"	2016	—	—	—	—	—	—	—	—	4	—		Agust D
"Daechwita" (대취타)	2020	—	100	2	—	6	8	68	76	1	—	US: 17,000	D-2
"People Pt. 2" (featuring IU)	2023	14	— (Note: "People Pt. 2" did not enter the Canadian Hot 100, but debuted at number 10 on the Canadian Digital Song Sales chart.)	6	8	7	*	— (Note: "People Pt. 2" did not enter the UK Singles Chart, but debuted at number three on the component Singles Sales and Singles Downloads charts.)	— (Note: "People Pt. 2" did not enter the Billboard Hot 100, but peaked at number five on the Bubbling Under Hot 100 chart.)	1	24	JPN: 5,427; US: 18,000	D-Day
"Haegeum" (해금)	2023	69	74	4	7	7	*	77	58	1	15	JPN: 9,482; US: 32,000	D-Day
"—" denotes releases that did not chart or were not released in that region. "*" denotes that chart is now defunct.

=== As featured artist ===
List of singles as featured artist, showing year released, selected chart positions, sales, and album name
Title	Year	Peak chart positions										Sales	Album
Title	Year	KOR Circle	KOR Billb. (Note: includes the Billboard K-pop Hot 100 (defunct as of April 2022) and the South Korea Songs chart (May 2022 onwards))	CAN	HUN	JPN Dig.	NZ Hot	UK	US	US World	WW	Sales	Album
"Song Request" (신청곡) Lee So-ra featuring Suga	2019	3	9	—	37	—	—	—	—	2	—	US: 3,000	Non-album singles
"Eight" (에잇) IU prod. featuring Suga	2020	1	1	— (Note: "Eight" did not enter the Canadian Hot 100, but peaked at number 27 on the Canadian Digital Song Sales chart.)	12	—	14	— (Note: "Eight" did not enter the UK Singles Chart, but peaked at number 42 on the component Singles Downloads Chart.)	— (Note: "Eight" did not enter the Billboard Hot 100, but peaked at number 13 on the Digital Songs chart.)	1	—	US: 7,000	Non-album singles
"Blueberry Eyes" (Max featuring Suga)	2020	—	—	— (Note: "Blueberry Eyes" did not enter the Canadian Hot 100, but peaked at number 46 on the Canadian Digital Song Sales chart.)	—	—	26	—	— (Note: "Blueberry Eyes" did not enter the Billboard Hot 100, but peaked at number 22 on the Digital Songs chart.)	—	—		Colour Vision
"That That" (Psy prod. featuring Suga)	2022	1	1	41	6	9	7	61	80	1	5	JPN: 9,438; US: 10,800; WW: 18,800	Psy 9th
"Lilith (Diablo IV Anthem)" (Halsey featuring Suga) (Note: A reworked version of the song of the same name from If I Can't Have Love, I Want Power (2021), "Lilith (Diablo IV Anthem)" was released as a digital single on June 5, 2023, for the release of Blizzard Entertainment's Diablo IV.)	2023	140	—	— (Note: "Lilith" did not enter the Canadian Hot 100, but peaked at number six on the Canadian Digital Song Sales chart.)	2	9	— (Note: "Lilith" did not enter the NZ Top 40 Singles Chart, but peaked at number 27 on the NZ Hot Singles Chart.)	— (Note: "Lilith" did not enter the UK Singles Chart, but debuted at numbers 14 and 13 on the component Singles Sales and Singles Downloads charts respectively.)	— (Note: "Lilith" did not enter the Billboard Hot 100, but peaked at number five on the Digital Songs chart.)	—	119	JPN: 4,085	Non-album single
"—" denotes releases that did not chart or were not released in that region. "*" denotes that chart is now defunct.

=== Promotional singles ===
List of promotional singles, showing year released, selected chart positions, sales, and album name
Title	Year	Peak chart positions								Sales	Album
Title	Year	KOR Gaon	CAN	HUN	NZ Hot	SCO	UK Down.	US	WW	Sales	Album
"Suga's Interlude" (Halsey featuring Suga)	2019	194	— (Note: "Suga's Interlude" did not enter the Canadian Hot 100, but debuted at number 25 on the Canadian Digital Song Sales chart.)	9	18	61	34	—	—	US: 9,100	Manic and Collabs
"My Universe (Suga Remix)" (Coldplay featuring BTS)	2021	—	—	—	—	*	—	—	—		Non-album single
"Girl of My Dreams" (Juice Wrld featuring Suga)	2021	—	56	10	3	*	19	29	37		Fighting Demons
"—" denotes releases that did not chart or were not released in that region. "*" denotes that chart is now defunct.

== Other charted songs ==
List of other charted songs, showing year released, selected chart positions, sales, and album name
Title	Year	Peak chart positions										Sales	Album
Title	Year	KOR Gaon	KOR Hot	CAN Dig.	HUN	JPN	NZ Hot	UK Down.	US Dig.	US World	WW	Sales	Album
"Intro: The Most Beautiful Moment in Life" (Note: credited under BTS but is a solo performed by Suga)	2015	110	—	—	—	—	—	—	—	—	—	KOR: 22,056	The Most Beautiful Moment in Life, Part 1
"First Love"	2016	32	—	—	—	—	—	—	—	8	—	KOR: 103,240	Wings
"The Last" (마지막)	2016	—	—	—	—	13	—	54	—	1	—	JPN: 2,295	Agust D
"So Far Away" (featuring Suran)	2016	—	—	—	—	—	—	—	—	19	—		Agust D
"Tony Montana" (featuring Yankie)	2016	—	—	—	—	—	—	—	—	22	—		Agust D
"Trivia: Seesaw"	2018	39	6	31	9	—	15	58	23	5	—	US: 11,000	Love Yourself: Answer
"Interlude: Shadow"	2020	48	31	32	19	—	—	59	19	11	—		Map of the Soul: 7
"Moonlight"	2020	—	—	47	19	—	34	—	14	5	—		D-2
"What Do You Think?"	2020	—	—	45	9	—	30	—	13	4	—		D-2
"Strange" (featuring RM)	2020	—	—	49	26	—	—	—	10	2	—	US: 7,600	D-2
"28" (featuring NiiHWA)	2020	—	—	—	—	—	—	—	19	7	—		D-2
"Burn It" (featuring Max)	2020	—	—	48	11	—	—	—	12	3	—		D-2
"People"	2020	—	—	—	24	—	32	—	16	4	—		D-2
"Honsool"	2020	—	—	—	22	—	—	—	24	10	—		D-2
"Interlude: Set Me Free"	2020	—	—	46	23	—	—	—	22	9	—		D-2
"Dear My Friend" (featuring Kim Jong-wan)	2020	—	—	—	25	—	—	—	20	8	—		D-2
"D-Day"	2023	—	—	32	—	—	31	—	15	4	—		D-Day
"Huh?!" (featuring J-Hope)	2023	—	—	28	—	—	29	—	8	3	—		D-Day
"Amygdala"	2023	—	—	38	—	—	28	—	12	5	161		D-Day
"SDL"	2023	—	—	36	—	—	—	—	20	9	—		D-Day
"Polar Night" (극야)	2023	—	—	39	—	23	—	55	24	3	—	JPN: 1,824	D-Day
"Interlude: Dawn"	2023	—	—	46	—	—	—	—	26	—	—		D-Day
"Snooze" (featuring Ryuichi Sakamoto and Woosung)	2023	—	—	22	—	33	—	—	13	6	—	JPN: 1,494	D-Day
"Life Goes On"	2023	—	—	30	—	—	—	—	19	8	—		D-Day
"—" denotes releases that did not chart or were not released in that region.

== Other songs ==
List of non-single songs, showing year released and other performing artists
Title	Year	Other artist(s)	Note(s)	Ref.
"518-062"	2010	None	Non-album releases	
"All I Do Is Win"	2012	None	Non-album releases	
"Adult Child"	2013	RM, Jin	Non-album releases	
"Dream Money"	2013	None	Non-album releases	
"It Doesn't Matter" (싸이하누월)	2013	None	Non-album releases	
"Ddaeng" (땡)	2018	RM, J-Hope	Non-album releases	

== Music videos ==
Name of music video, year released, other credited artist(s), director, and additional notes
Title	Year	Other performer(s) credited	Director(s)	Description	Ref.
"Intro: The Most Beautiful Moment in Life"	2015	None	GDW	Animated video	
"Agust D" (Note: released as Agust D)	2016	None	Sung-wook Kim (OUI)		
"Give It to Me"	2016	None	Sung-wook Kim (OUI)		
"Interlude : Shadow"	2020	None	Oui Kim (OUI)	Album trailer for BTS' 2020 studio album Map of the Soul: 7	
"Daechwita"	2020	None	Yong-seok Choi (Lumpens)		
"That That"	2022	Psy	Yong-seok Choi (Lumpens)	Set in a Western-themed town in the middle of a desert, Psy dances in cowboy attire with a troop of similarly dressed dancers while performing the song. When Suga appears, the two have a showdown as Suga raps his verse. They then dance together in a crowded saloon, a car, and outdoors. At one point, Psy is seen wearing a costume from the "Gangnam Style" music video, but that version of him is seemingly knocked out by Suga and passes out in the rapper's arms.	
"People Pt. 2"	2023	IU	Woogie Kim	Agust D spends time alone in his home, journaling, writing the song, and with a pet dog. He is also seen recording the song in a studio, and enjoying the scenic view outside his home. IU does not appear in the video. A brief black and white clip of Suga explaining the song's creation and the message behind its lyrics plays after the video's end.	
"Haegeum"	2023	None	Yong-seok Choi (Lumpens)	Presented as a mafia film in the film noir style, Agust D plays two versions of himself at conflict with one another: the Being (a police detective) and the Exister (a gangster).	
"Amygdala"	2023	None		Agust D repeatedly relives the memory of a traumatic car accident while trapped in a room that represents his mind. A past version of his self tries to break him out of the room.	
"Lilith"	2023	Halsey	Henry Hobsen	Filmed inside the Chapelle des Jésuites in Cambrai, France, the music video is a collaboration with Blizzard Entertainment for the release of Diablo IV. Halsey enters the candlelit cathedral dressed in a hooded black cloak while performing the song. She eventually removes the cloak, revealing a sorceress costume underneath, and is attacked by arrows that inflict bloody lesions about her body. Suga appears halfway through the video, dressed in a dark robe and surrounded by a haze of red smoke, and performs his verse in a shadowy room. Halsey transforms into the game's protagonist, the Blessed Mother Lilith, at the end.	

- Suga appeared in a three-minute long short film directed by Yong-seok Choi of Lumpens, titled BTS Wings Short Film #4 First Love, released in September 2016 in promotion of BTS' fourth studio album Wings.
