= List of songs produced by Suga =

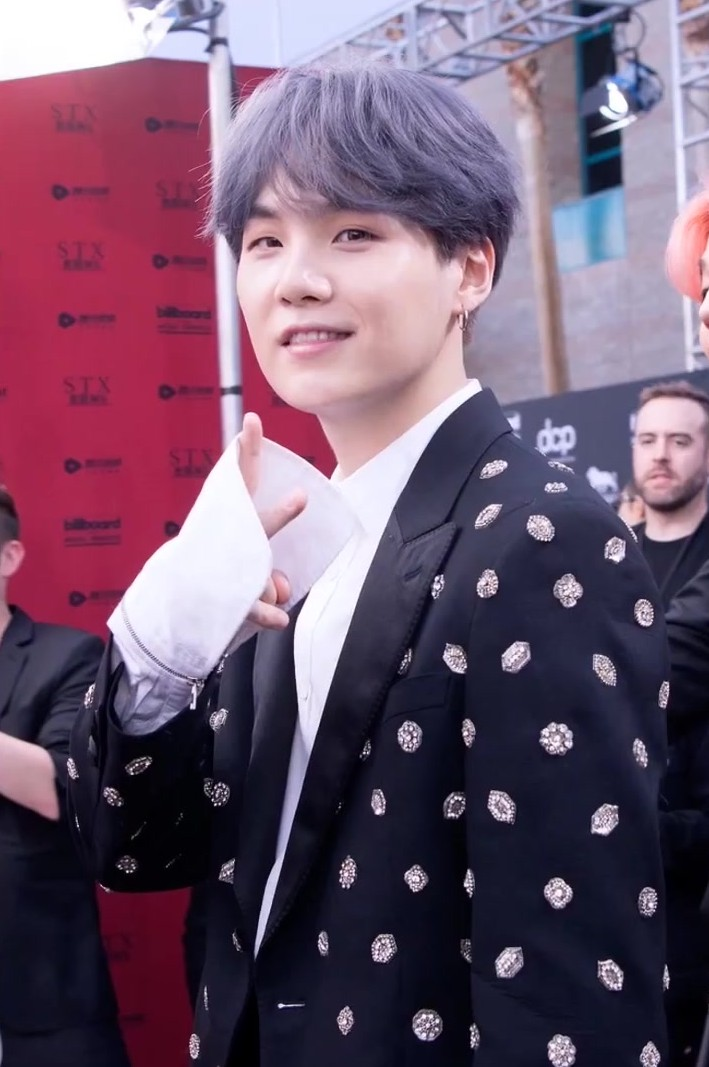
Suga at the Billboard Music Awards red carpet on May 1, 2019

Min Yoon-gi (Korean: 민윤기; born March 9, 1993), better known by his stage names, Suga and Agust D, is a South Korean rapper. Managed by Big Hit Music, he has been a member of South Korean boy band BTS since 2013, but worked as a producer prior to joining the group. Nicknamed "The Hand of Midas" by Korean media for making commercially successful songs, he has worked with artists such as Suran, Epik High, IU, and Coldplay.

== Songs ==
Key
†	Indicates a single
#	Indicates a non-commercial release
‡	Indicates songs produced solely by Suga

Song title, original artist, album of release, and year of release
Song	Artist(s)	Producer(s)	Album	Year	Ref.
"140503 at dawn" (140503 새벽에)	Agust D	Agust D, (Note: Suga works under the alias "Agust D" for his mixtapes.) Slow Rabbit	Agust D	2016	
"518-062" #	D-Town	Gloss (Note: Suga worked under the alias "Gloss" prior to 2013.) ‡	Non-album single	2010	
"724148" (치리사일사팔)	Agust D	Agust D ‡	Agust D	2016	
"Agust D" † (Note: contains a sample of James Brown's "It's a Man's Man's Man's World")	Agust D	Agust D ‡	Agust D	2016	
"Autumn Leaves" (고엽)	BTS	Suga, Slow Rabbit	The Most Beautiful Moment in Life, Pt. 2 The Most Beautiful Moment in Life: Young Forever	2015	
"Boyz With Fun" (흥탄소년단)	BTS	Suga, Pdogg	The Most Beautiful Moment in Life, Pt. 1	2015	
"Boyz With Fun" (Demo Version)	BTS	Suga, Pdogg	Proof	2022	
"Boyz With Fun" (Japanese Version) (フンタン少年団)	BTS	Suga, Pdogg	Youth	2016	
"Burn It"	Agust D feat. Max	Agust D, Ghstloop	D-2	2020	
"Come Over"	BTS	Cirkut, Ammo, Suga	Arirang	2026	
"Daechwita" † (대취타)	Agust D	Agust D, El Capitxn	D-2	2020	
"Ddaeng" # (땡)	BTS	Suga, J.Pearl	Non-album single	2018	
"Dear My Friend" (어땠을까)	Agust D feat. Kim Jong-wan	Agust D, Kim Jong Wan, El Capitxn	D-2	2020	
"Eight" † (에잇)	IU feat. and prod. Suga of BTS	Suga ‡	Non-album single	2020	
"Eternal Sunshine" (새벽에)	Epik High	Suga, El Capitxn	Sleepless in __________	2019	
"First Love"	BTS (Note: credited to BTS but is a solo track performed by Suga)	Suga, Miss Kay	Wings	2016	
"Give It To Me" †	Agust D	Agust D ‡	Agust D	2016	
"Haegeum" † (해금)	Agust D	Agust D ‡	D-Day	2023	
"Honsool" (혼술)	Agust D	Agust D, Pdogg	D-2	2020	
"Huh?!"	Agust D feat. J-Hope	Agust D, El Capitxn	D-Day	2023	
"Interlude: Dawn"	Agust D	Agust D, El Capitxn	D-Day	2023	
"Interlude: Dream, Reality"	Agust D	Agust D, Slow Rabbit	Agust D	2016	
"Interlude: Set Me Free"	Agust D	Agust D, Pdogg	D-2	2020	
"Interlude: Shadow"	BTS	Suga, El Capitxn, Ghstloop	Map of the Soul: 7	2020	
"Intro: Dt sugA"	Agust D feat. DJ Friz	Agust D, Pdogg	Agust D	2016	
"Intro: The Most Beautiful Moment in Life" (Intro: 화양연화)	BTS	Suga, Slow Rabbit	The Most Beautiful Moment in Life, Pt. 1 The Most Beautiful Moment in Life: Young Forever	2015	
"In the Soop" #	BTS	Suga ‡	Non-album single	2020	
"It Doesn't Matter MIX Final" # (싸이하누월 MIX Final)	BTS	Suga ‡	Non-album single	2013	
"Jump"	BTS	Suga, Pdogg, Supreme Boi	Skool Luv Affair	2014	
"Jump" (Demo Version)	BTS	Suga, Pdogg, Supreme Boi	Proof	2022	
"Jump" (Japanese Version)	BTS	Suga, Pdogg, Supreme Boi	Wake Up	2014	
"Let Me Know"	BTS	Suga, Pdogg	Dark & Wild	2014	
"Moonlight" (저 달)	Agust D	Agust D, Ghstloop	D-2	2020	
"My Universe" (SUGA's Remix)	Coldplay and BTS	Suga ‡	Music of the Spheres	2021	
"Our Island"	Hybe Corporation (Note: original soundtrack for the mobile game BTS Island: In the Seom)	Suga, El Capitxn	Non-album single	2022	
"Outro: Her"	BTS	Suga, Slow Rabbit	Love Yourself: Her; Love Yourself: Answer; Proof	2017	
"Over the Horizon"	Samsung (Note: for the remix of the Samsung Galaxy brand song)	Suga ‡	Non-album single	2021	
"Over the Horizon" (2022 Version)	Samsung (Note: for the 2022 remix of the Samsung Galaxy brand song)	Suga ‡	Non-album single	2022	
"People" (사람)	Agust D	Agust D, Pdogg	D-2	2020	
"Polar Night" (극야)	Agust D	Agust D, El Capitxn	D-Day	2023	
"Respect"	BTS	Suga, Hiss Noise, El Capitxn	Map of the Soul: 7	2020	
"SDL"	Agust D	Agust D, El Capitxn	D-Day	2023	
"Seesaw" (Demo Version)	BTS	Suga ‡	Proof	2022	
"Seesaw X I NEED U" (Remix) #	BTS	Suga ‡	Non-album single	2018	
"So Far Away"	Agust D feat. Suran	Agust D, Slow Rabbit	Agust D	2016	
"Stay Alive"†	Jungkook prod. Suga of BTS	Suga, El Capitxn	Non-album single	2022	
"Suga's Interlude"	Halsey feat. Suga	Suga, Halsey, Lido, Pdogg	Manic	2019	
"Take Two"†	BTS	Suga, El Capitxn	Non-album single	2023	
"That That" †	Psy prod. and feat. Suga of BTS	Suga, Psy	Psy 9th	2022	
"The Last" (마지막)	Agust D	Agust D, June, Pdogg	Agust D	2016	
"Tomorrow"	BTS	Suga, Slow Rabbit	Skool Luv Affair	2014	
"Tony Montana"	Agust D feat. Jimin	Agust D, Pdogg, Supreme Boi	Proof	2022	
"Tony Montana"	Agust D feat. Yankie	Agust D, Pdogg	Agust D	2016	
"Trivia 轉: Seesaw"	BTS	Suga, Slow Rabbit	Love Yourself: Answer; Proof	2018	
"We don't talk together"	Heize feat. Giriboy and prod. Suga of BTS	Suga ‡	Non-album single	2019	
"Who Am I?"	Reflow feat. Basick	Gloss ‡	Represent	2011	
"Wine" † (오늘 취하면)	Suran feat. Changmo	Suga ‡	Walkin'	2017	
"You"	ØMI prod. Suga of BTS	Suga, ØMI	Answer... Shine	2021	

== See also ==
- List of songs written by Suga
