= Wine (song) =

2017 single by Suran featuring Changmo

Single by Suran featuring Changmo

from the album Walkin'
- Language: Korean
- Released: April 27, 2017
- Studio: Carrot Express (Seoul); Dublekick (Seoul)
- Genre: Hip hop; R&B
- Length: 3:52
- Label: Million Market
- Composer: Suga
- Lyricists: Suran; Slow Rabbit; Changmo; June
- Producer: Suga

Suran singles chronology
"Winter Bird" (2016)	"Wine" (2017)	"1+1=0" (2017)

"Wine" (Korean: 오늘 취하면; lit. "If I Get Drunk Today") is a song by South Korean singer-songwriter Suran featuring rapper Changmo. Released as a digital single on April 27, 2017, by Million Market through Loen Entertainment, the song served as the first single from Suran's debut extended play (EP) Walkin', which was released in June. Produced by Suga of BTS, the song is a hip hop and R&B track with elements of electropop and future bass, and was written by Suran, Slow Rabbit, Changmo, and June. The song marked Suga's first independent production credit outside of personal projects and his work with BTS—additional production was provided by Slow Rabbit. Lyrically, the song is from the perspective of a person reminiscing about memories of a past relationship while drinking a glass of wine.

Commercially, the single peaked at number two on the South Korean Gaon Digital Chart and number 11 on the Billboard Kpop Hot 100. It has sold over 2.5 million copies domestically.

== Music and lyrics ==
"Wine" is a "trendy hip-hop R&B song with an impressive pop-based groove" and contains elements of electropop and future bass. Composed by Suga of BTS, the song was written by Suran, Big Hit producer Slow Rabbit, rapper Changmo, and June, (Note: June was a trainee at Big Hit Entertainment at the time. Bang Si-hyuk offered him the opportunity to learn composition and he eventually came to work on the song.) and tells the story of an individual reminiscing about memories of a former lover over a glass of wine. The song was also produced by Suga, with additional production from Slow Rabbit.

== Background and release ==
Suran first became acquainted with Suga through a rapper with whom she was close friends—she knew of him as said rapper's protégé. Through that introduction, both artists developed a working music relationship which led to Suran appearing as a featured vocalist on the track "So Far Away" for Suga's 2016 mixtape Agust D. On April 21, 2017, Million Market and Big Hit Entertainment announced news of a special collaboration between the two. Both labels confirmed that the former had recently finished recording a new song "Wine" (오늘 취하면; "If I Get Drunk Today"), produced by the latter. Slated for release later in the month, the song would be Suga's first production endeavour—outside of his solo project and BTS-related works—for another artist. Suran revealed in later interviews how the song came about. She had gone through a difficult time during the past year while working on music alone and had become depressed. Suga reached out to her during that time and they talked about music, and he proposed that they collaborate again. He played the demo for what would become "Wine" for her in the studio and after hearing it, she felt it was "bright" and the "atmosphere was good" so they began working on the track together. According to Slow Rabbit, work on the song began at the start of December 2016.

Regarding which artist to feature on the song with her, Suran decided on Changmo as she was a fan of the rapper's music and felt he would be a good choice. She contacted Beenzino, with whom she had previously worked, and asked for Changmo's phone number. On April 26, 2017, Suran posted a photo of herself with Changmo to her social media and revealed "Wine"'s release date and time in its caption: April 27 at 12PM. Million Market officially confirmed later that day that the rapper featured on the track, further increasing interest in the song as Changmo was well known as a "skilled, trendy rapper" at the time, having recently released a collaboration of his own with singer Hyolyn that performed well on the music charts and earned him the moniker of "music powerhouse" by news media.

The cover art for "Wine" was revealed the morning of April 27, 2017, hours before the song's release, and featured a long-haired, flushed-faced girl (to intimate she had been drinking) in a white dress staring into the camera with a "dreamy expression". Suran shared the image on her Instagram account and named Yang Yu-jin as the cover model, writing: "...(album jacket model is #YangYujin-nim, she got prettily drunk on behalf of me)". The song was released at noon—as the first single from the singer's then upcoming debut mini album—and made available for streaming and digital download on various music sites. No music video was created to accompany the single, but Million Market uploaded a short "Making Film" sketch video containing behind-the-scenes footage of the recording process with Suran and Changmo to its YouTube channel the following day.

== Commercial performance ==
Following its release midway into an ongoing tracking period, "Wine" debuted at number four on the week 17 issue of South Korea's Gaon Digital Chart for the period dated April 23–29, 2017, with only three days of availability. It also entered the Download Chart at number three with 165,012 sales, and the Streaming Chart at number 14 with 3,499,689 streams. The following week, it peaked at number two on all three charts, with 148,304 sales and 7,083,770 streams for the period dated April 30–May 6. The song debuted on the April monthly rankings for the aforementioned charts at numbers 34, 17, and 84 respectively. It achieved its highest placement on the monthly rankings in May, peaking at number four on the Digital chart, number five on the Download chart, and number one on the Streaming chart, with 373,907 sales and over 26 million streams. By the end of June, "Wine" had sold over 776,000 copies and surpassed 50 million streams. It ended 2017 as the 15th most-downloaded and 13th most-streamed song of the year with over 1.5 million sales and 96.5 million streams, and was the 15th best-performing digital song overall in South Korea. In February 2019, Gaon reported that "Wine" had sold over 2.5 million domestic downloads as of January that year.

"Wine" earned Suran her first solo entry on the Billboard World Digital Song Sales chart in the United States, debuting at number seven on the issue dated May 13, 2017; she previously appeared on the chart in 2015, as a featured artist on "Pride And Prejudice" by Zico. The song spent two consecutive weeks on the chart, peaking at number five in its second week.

== Live performances ==
Suran gave the premiere live performance of "Wine" on KBS2's You Hee-yeol's Sketchbook, during her appearance on the show's June 3, 2017, episode. Accompanied by an "atmospheric piano arrangement", the singer sang the song solo, as Changmo did not appear with her, and did his rap part herself. The duo performed the song live together for the first time on June 6, at a free outdoor concert held by Suran in Seoul Forest, Seongdong-gu, as a thank-you to fans for their support of "Wine" and her debut album Walkin' (released on June 2)—the concert was simultaneously broadcast online via V Live.

== Track listing ==
1. "Wine" – 3:52
2. "Wine" (Instrumental) – 3:52

== Awards and nominations ==
"Wine" was nominated for Best Vocal Performance – Female at the 2017 Mnet Asian Music Awards, but lost to "You, Clouds, Rain" by Heize. It also received nominations for and won the Best R&B/Soul and Hot Trend awards at the 2017 Melon Music Awards held on December 2, 2017. In January 2018, the song won the Best R&B/Soul Award at the 32nd Golden Disc Awards. It was additionally nominated for a Digital Daesang, but did not win. "Wine" also received a nomination for Song of the Year – April at the 7th Gaon Chart Music Awards held in February, but lost to "Palette" by IU.

== Credits and personnel ==
Adapted from Melon.

- Suran – songwriting, composition
- Slow Rabbit – songwriting, composition, arrangement, recording (at Carrot Express)
- Changmo – songwriting
- June – songwriting, composition
- Suga – composition, production, arrangement
- Cho-rong Kim – recording (at Dublekick Studio)
- Yang ga – mixing (at Big Hit Studio)
- Nam-woo Kwon – mastering (at JFS Mastering)
- Bun-hong Kim – artwork (at PINKK)
- Young-jun Yoo – photography

== Release history ==
Region	Date	Format(s)	Label	Ref.
South Korea	April 27, 2017	Digital download; streaming	Million Market	
Various	April 27, 2017	Digital download; streaming	Million Market	

== See also ==
- List of songs produced by Suga
