= Snooze (Agust D song) =

2023 song by Agust D

Song by Agust D featuring Ryuichi Sakamoto and Woosung

from the album D-Day
- Language: Korean
- Released: April 21, 2023
- Genre: Rap rock
- Length: 4:24
- Label: Big Hit
- Songwriters: Agust D; El Capitxn; Ryuichi Sakamoto; Woosung
- Producer: El Capitxn

"Snooze" is a song by South Korean rapper Agust D, better known as Suga of BTS, featuring Japanese composer Ryuichi Sakamoto and Korean-American singer Woosung of the Rose. It was released on April 21, 2023, through Big Hit Music, as the ninth track from the rapper's debut studio album D-Day.

== Charts ==
Weekly chart performance for "Snooze"
Chart (2023)	Peak position
Japan Digital Singles (Oricon)	13
Japan Download (Billboard Japan)	32
US Digital Song Sales (Billboard)	13
Vietnam (Vietnam Hot 100)	89
