= Amygdala (song) =

2023 song by Agust D

Song by Agust D

from the album D-Day
- Language: Korean
- Released: April 21, 2023
- Genre: Trap hip-hop; pop
- Length: 4:11
- Label: Big Hit
- Songwriters: Agust D; El Capitxn
- Producer: El Capitxn

Music video
- Amygdala on YouTube

"Amygdala" is a song by South Korean rapper Agust D, better known as Suga of BTS. It was released on April 21, 2023, through Big Hit Music, as the fourth track from the rapper's debut studio album D-Day.

== Music video ==
Agust D repeatedly relives the memory of a traumatic car accident while trapped in a room that represents his mind. A past version of his self tries to break him out of the room.

== Charts ==
Weekly chart performance for "Amygdala"
Chart (2023)	Peak position
Global 200 (Billboard)	161
Japan Digital Singles (Oricon)	18
Japan Download (Billboard Japan)	43
New Zealand Hot Singles (RMNZ)	28
US Digital Song Sales (Billboard)	12
Vietnam (Vietnam Hot 100)	65
