= Strange (Agust D song) =

2020 song by Agust D

Song by Agust D featuring RM

from the album D-2
- Language: Korean; English
- Released: May 22, 2020
- Length: 3:17
- Label: Big Hit
- Songwriters: Agust D; El Capitxn; Ghstloop; RM
- Producers: El Capitxn; Ghstloop

"Strange" (Korean: 이상하지 않은가; lit. 'Isn't It Strange') is a song by South Korean rapper Agust D, better known as Suga of BTS, featuring fellow South Korean rapper and bandmate RM. It was released on May 22, 2020, through Big Hit Music, as the fourth track from the rapper's second mixtape D-2.

== Charts ==
Weekly chart performance for "Strange"
Chart (2020)	Peak position
Hungary (Single Top 40)	26
US Digital Song Sales (Billboard)	10
