= D-Day (song) =

2023 song by Agust D

Song by Agust D

from the album D-Day
- Language: Korean; English
- Released: April 21, 2023
- Genre: Trap hip-hop
- Length: 3:31
- Label: Big Hit
- Songwriters: Agust D; Vincent "Invincible" Watson; 2Live
- Producers: Watson; 2Live

"D-Day" is a song by South Korean rapper Agust D, better known as Suga of BTS. It was released on April 21, 2023, through Big Hit Music, as the first track from the rapper's debut studio album D-Day.

== Charts ==
Weekly chart performance for "D-Day"
| Chart (2023) | Peak position |
|---|---|
| Japan Digital Singles (Oricon) | 15 |
| Japan Download (Billboard Japan) | 40 |
| New Zealand Hot Singles (RMNZ) | 31 |
| US Digital Song Sales (Billboard) | 15 |
| Vietnam (Vietnam Hot 100) | 94 |
