= Dear My Friend (Agust D song) =

2020 song by Agust D

Song by Agust D featuring Kim Jong-wan

from the album D-2
- Language: Korean
- Released: May 22, 2020
- Length: 4:52
- Label: Big Hit
- Songwriters: Agust D; El Capitxn; Kim Jong-wan
- Producers: Agust D; El Capitxn; Kim Jong-wan

"Dear My Friend" (Korean: 어땠을까; lit. 'What Would've It Been Like') is a song by South Korean rapper Agust D, better known as Suga of BTS, featuring South Korean singer Kim Jong-wan. It was released on May 22, 2020, through Big Hit Music, as the tenth and last track from the rapper's second mixtape D-2.

== Charts ==
Weekly chart performance for "Dear My Friend"
Chart (2020)	Peak position
Hungary (Single Top 40)	25
US Digital Song Sales (Billboard)	20
