= People (Agust D song) =

2020 song by Agust D

Song by Agust D

from the album D-2
- Language: Korean
- Released: May 22, 2020
- Length: 3:17
- Label: Big Hit
- Songwriters: Agust D; Pdogg
- Producers: Agust D; Pdogg

"People" (Korean: 사람) is a song by South Korean rapper Agust D, better known as Suga of BTS. It was released on May 22, 2020, through Big Hit Music, as the seventh track from the rapper's second mixtape D-2.

== Charts ==
Weekly chart performance for "People"
Chart (2020)	Peak position
Hungary (Single Top 40)	24
New Zealand Hot Singles (RMNZ)	32
US Digital Song Sales (Billboard)	16
