= Haegeum (song) =

2023 single by Agust D

Single by Agust D

from the album D-Day
- Language: Korean
- Released: April 21, 2023
- Genre: Hip hop
- Length: 2:48
- Label: Big Hit
- Songwriter: Agust D
- Producer: Agust D

Agust D singles chronology
"People Pt. 2" (2023)	"Haegeum" (2023)

Music video
- Haegeum on YouTube

"Haegeum" (Korean: 해금; lit. 'Unblock') is a song by South Korean rapper Agust D, better known as Suga of BTS. It was released on April 21, 2023, through Big Hit Music, as the second single from the rapper's debut studio album D-Day. Written and produced by Agust D, the song is a hip hop track that addresses themes of freedom and liberation.

== Music and lyrics ==
"Haegeum" is a heavy hip hop song that includes the use of a South Korean traditional two-stringed fiddle called haegeum in its instrumentation—D-2's "Daechwita" also featured the instrument. Its title is a word play that references both the instrument and an interpretation of liberation specific to the song—"to advocate for freedom in a reality built on unspoken societal expectations and restrictions echoed in today's online culture". In Korean, Agust D asks listeners to question their own liberation ("What is it, exactly, that's been restricting us? / Maybe we do it to ourselves. Slaves to capitalism, slaves to money, slaves to hatred and prejudice") and the role they play in that of others ("Freedom of expression / Could be reason for somebody's death / Could you still consider that freedom?"), making a case for "doing away 'with the nonsense' that clutters online" and reality. He then addresses the internet culture that both "fascinates and destroys": "Endless influx of information prohibits freedom of imagination/ And seeks conformity of thought/ All these painful noises blind you."

== Commercial performance ==
In Japan, "Haegeum" entered the daily issue of Oricon's Digital Singles Chart for April 21, 2023, at number three with 3,524 sales. It debuted on the subsequent weekly chart at number seven, with 9,482 cumulative sales for the period dated April 17–23. The single was the seventh most-downloaded song of its release week on Billboard Japan's Download Songs chart and entered the domestic Hot 100 at number 81; it rose to number 66 on the latter the following week.

"Haegeum" sold 32,000 copies and accumulated 4.6 million streams in its opening week in the United States. It debuted at number 58 on the May 6, 2023, issue of the Billboard Hot 100 and earned Agust D his first top-10 entry on the corresponding issue of the Hot Rap Songs chart (number nine) as well as his fourth number-one on the Rap Digital Song Sales chart. The song also entered the Global 200 at number 15; the Global Excl. US chart at number 12; and four of Billboard's Hits of the World charts: Indonesia Songs at number 19, Singapore Songs at number 20, South Korea Songs at number 24, and Philippines Songs at number 25.

== Music video ==
A "climactic" teaser preceded the music video on April 20. Set as a modern day follow-up to "Daechwita", Agust D plays a character referred to as the Exister (a gangster) who is "out for blood". Accompanied by a group of men, he enters a rundown building and appears to stab an unseen person.

=== Reception ===
The Los Angeles Times described the music video as "deliciously grisly" and "Oldboy-worthy".

== Charts ==
=== Weekly charts ===
Weekly chart performance
Chart (2023)	Peak position
Canada (Canadian Hot 100)	74
Global 200 (Billboard)	15
Greece International (IFPI)	39
Hungary (Single Top 40)	4
India International Singles (IMI)	5
Indonesia (Billboard)	19
Japan (Japan Hot 100)	66
Japan Digital Singles (Oricon)	7
Japan Streaming (Oricon)	45
Lithuania (AGATA)	48
Malaysia International (RIM)	17
New Zealand Hot Singles (RMNZ)	7
Philippines (Billboard)	25
Singapore (RIAS)	16
South Korea (Circle)	69
UK Singles (OCC)	77
US Billboard Hot 100	58
US World Digital Song Sales (Billboard)	1
Vietnam (Vietnam Hot 100)	5

=== Monthly charts ===
Monthly chart performance
Chart (2023)	Peak position
South Korea (Circle)	121

=== Year-end charts ===
Annual chart rankings
Chart (2023)	Rank
US Digital Song Sales (Billboard)	72
