= Burn It (song) =

2020 song by Agust D

Song by Agust D featuring Max

from the album D-2
- Language: Korean
- Released: May 22, 2020
- Length: 4:52
- Label: Big Hit
- Songwriters: Agust D; Ghstloop; Max
- Producers: Agust D; Ghstloop

"Burn It" is a song by South Korean rapper Agust D, better known as Suga of BTS, featuring American singer Max. It was released on May 22, 2020, through Big Hit Music, as the sixth track from the rapper's second mixtape D-2.

== Charts ==
Weekly chart performance for "Burn It"
Chart (2020)	Peak position
Hungary (Single Top 40)	11
US Digital Song Sales (Billboard)	12
