= Huh?! =

Song by Agust D featuring J-Hope

from the album D-Day
- Language: Korean
- Released: April 21, 2023
- Genre: Drill; trap pop; emo rap
- Length: 3:03
- Label: Big Hit
- Songwriters: Agust D; El Capitxn; J-Hope
- Producers: Agust D; El Capitxn

"Huh?!" (stylized in all caps) is a song by South Korean rapper Agust D, better known as Suga of BTS, featuring South Korean rapper and bandmate J-Hope. It was released on April 21, 2023, through Big Hit Music, as the third track from the rapper's debut studio album D-Day.

== Charts ==
Weekly chart performance for "Huh?!"
Chart (2023)	Peak position
Japan Digital Singles (Oricon)	14
Japan Download (Billboard Japan)	37
New Zealand Hot Singles (RMNZ)	29
South Korea Download (Circle)	19
US Digital Song Sales (Billboard)	8
Vietnam (Vietnam Hot 100)	58
