= Daechwita (song) =

Single by Agust D

from the album D-2
- Language: Korean
- Released: May 22, 2020
- Length: 3:46
- Label: Big Hit
- Songwriters: Agust D; El Capitxn
- Producers: Agust D; El Capitxn

"Daechwita" (Korean: 대취타) is a song by South Korean rapper Agust D, better known as Suga of BTS. Released as a digital single on May 22, 2020, through Big Hit Entertainment.

== Theme ==
The song "Daechwita" has been drawn from the themes of traditional Korean storytelling and music which, according to the artist, developed naturally into the pansori storytelling and kkwaenggwari percussion. These themes developed from wanting to sample the sound of a real daechwita, a piece of traditional Korean military music. These daechwita elements are clearly audible in the song and its music video.

== Music video ==
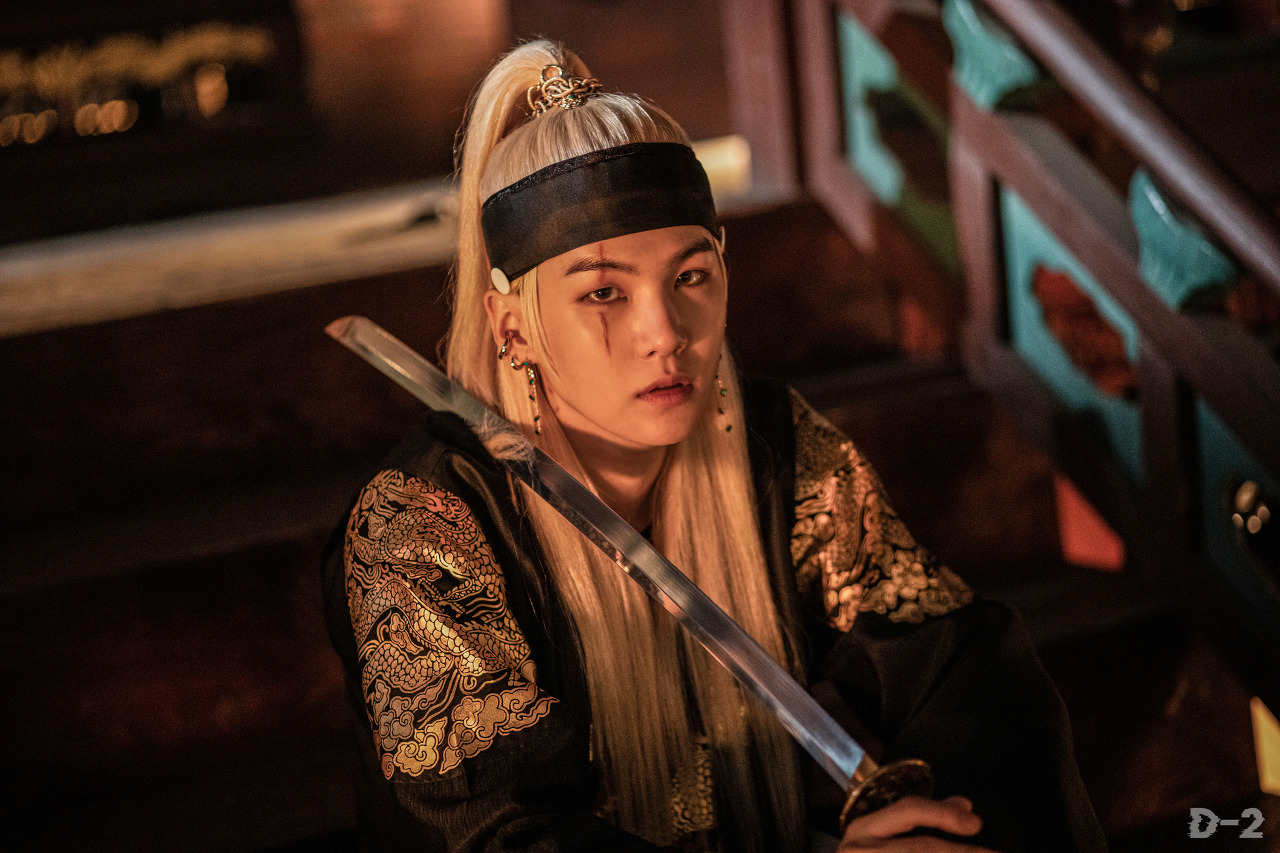
Agust D on the set of the "Daechwita" music video

The official video was released on May 22, 2020. The music video draws inspiration from the 2012 film Masquerade, in which a lowly acrobat takes the role of a double for King Gwanghae, and eventually takes the throne while the ruler recovers from being poisoned; in the music video, Agust D acts as both the king and his double. This was revealed by Agust D in a behind-the-scenes video to be symbolic; the king represents the "old" Agust D, while his double represents the "new" Agust D. At the end of the video, the double is meant to be executed, but he instead forms a pact with the executioner and shoots the king, killing him.

Agust D's theme of contrasts, previously mentioned in relation to differences between D-2 and his debut mixtape, continues in the music video. For instance, he wears a modern outfit in front of a traditional, Silla-era building, and drifts a car through its courtyard.

== Charts ==
=== Weekly charts ===
Weekly chart performance for "Daechwita"
| Chart (2020) | Peak position |
|---|---|
| Canada (Canadian Hot 100) | 100 |
| Greece International (IFPI) | 57 |
| Hungary (Single Top 40) | 2 |
| New Zealand Hot Singles (RMNZ) | 6 |
| Scotland (OCC) | 8 |
| UK Singles (OCC) | 68 |
| US Billboard Hot 100 | 76 |
| US Digital Song Sales (Billboard) | 1 |
