= D-2 (mixtape) =

Mixtape by Agust D
- Released: May 22, 2020
- Studios: Big Hit (Note: BTS members and the Big Hit production team have individual "studios" within the greater Big Hit Entertainment building. These are credited separately in the liner notes.); Colour Vision; Satellite
- Genre: Hip hop
- Length: 32:22
- Language: Korean
- Label: Big Hit
- Producer: Agust D

Agust D chronology
Agust D (2016)	D-2 (2020)	D-Day (2023)

Singles from D-2
- 1. "Daechwita" Released: May 22, 2020

D-2 is the second mixtape released by South Korean rapper Agust D, better known as Suga of BTS, following his eponymous debut mixtape released in 2016. The mixtape was released on May 22, 2020, through Big Hit Entertainment, along with the lead single "Daechwita" (Korean: 대취타). The mixtape consists of ten tracks, with songs sung and rapped in both Korean and English. Its lyrics share the rapper's viewpoint of the contemporary world.

Commercially, the album peaked at number 11 on the Billboard 200, number 7 on the Official UK Chart, and number 2 on the ARIA chart, setting three new records as the highest-ranking mixtape in the US, UK, and Australia by a Korean solo artist. "Daechwita" debuted at number 76 on the Billboard Hot 100 chart, making Suga the first Korean soloist to simultaneously chart on the Hot 100 and Billboard 200. The single also debuted at number one on the Billboard Rap Digital Song Sales Chart, becoming the highest-charting and first song by a Korean artist to do so.

== Background ==
Due to Agust D's heavy schedule with BTS, the mixtape was produced at a far slower rate than the previous mixtape. Originally, the mixtape was almost finished in 2019, but the artist wanted to spend more time editing it to make it sound "more complete". In total, production took almost 4 years since the last mixtape.

== Production and theme ==
Prior to writing the mixtape, Agust D spent the bulk of his time listening to his previous, self-titled mixtape. The rapper stated that he "always liked making music that contrasts with my previous songs ... to show there is a beauty in contrasting things".

D-2 is, according to Agust D, "a documentation of myself as a 28-year old", and "a documentation of myself from 2016 onwards". He has said that the mixtape is focused more on talking about the present, comparing it to his last mixtape, Agust D, which was more focused on telling the past.

The title song "Daechwita" has also been drawn from the themes of traditional Korean storytelling and music which, according to the artist, developed naturally into the pansori storytelling and kkwaenggwari percussion. These themes developed from wanting to sample the sound of a real daechwita, a piece of traditional Korean military music. These daechwita elements are clearly audible in the song of the same name and its music video, released on the same day as the mixtape. According to Agust D, the many questions the album raises about society are for the listener to answer, and he is merely putting forth the question.

D-2 features collaborators such as MAX, NiiHWa, and Kim Jong-wan as co-writers and singers, along with RM, who is his co-member in BTS. The large-scale collaboration present in the album is not new to the rapper, as he has previously collaborated through both BTS and himself with artists such as Halsey and IU within the year prior to the release of the mixtape.

== Name and release ==
Twenty days prior to release, the rapper had told fans not to expect anything big in the future, and said that the mixtape was still incomplete. D-2 was promoted through social media as a countdown of cryptic teaser images during the days before release. Fans of the artist had been engaged in continuous speculation on whether it was going to be the second Agust D mixtape or another project. Hours before release, the artist's profile picture on Apple Music changed, leading to an increase in speculation on social media. According to Billboard, Agust D thought the name "Agust D 2" was not satisfying enough for the album. Instead of releasing the mixtape on "D-Day" or "D-0", the artist wanted to undermine expectations and release it a few days before, inspiring him to combine "Agust D-2" and the second to last day of the countdown "D-2" into the name of the mixtape.

== Music video ==
On May 22, 2020, the official video for the mixtape's lead single, "Daechwita", was released. The music video draws inspiration from the 2012 film Masquerade, in which a lowly acrobat takes the role of a double for King Gwanghae, and eventually takes the throne while the ruler recovers from being poisoned; in the music video, Agust D acts as both the king and his double. This was revealed by Agust D in a behind-the-scenes video to be symbolic; the king represents the "old" Agust D, while his double represents the "new" Agust D. At the end of the video, the double is meant to be executed, but he instead forms a pact with the executioner and shoots the king, killing him.

Agust D's theme of contrasts, previously mentioned in relation to differences between D-2 and his debut mixtape, continues in the music video. For instance, he wears a modern outfit in front of a traditional, Silla-era building, and drifts a car through its courtyard.

== Controversy ==
The third track on the album, "What Do You Think?", originally contained a sample of a speech by cult leader Jim Jones, known for directing his followers to join in a mass murder-suicide in 1978. Big Hit later issued an apology on behalf of the song's producers who were not aware of the source of the speech used in the sample, and re-released an edited version of the track following its removal.

== Track listing ==
D-2 track listing
No.	Title	Writer(s)	Producer(s)	Length
1.	"Moonlight" (저 달; Jeo dal [lit. "This Moon"])	Agust D; Ghstloop	Agust D; Ghstloop	2:44
2.	"Daechwita" (대취타; [lit. "A Big Blow"])	Agust D; El Capitxn	Agust D; El Capitxn	3:46
3.	"What Do You Think?" (어떻게 생각해; Eotteoke saenggakae)	Agust D; El Capitxn; Ghstloop	El Capitxn; Ghstloop	3:03
4.	"Strange" (featuring RM) (이상하지 않은가; Isanghaji aneunga [lit. "Isn't It Strange"])	Agust D; El Capitxn; Ghstloop; RM	El Capitxn; Ghstloop	3:17
5.	"28" (featuring Niihwa) 점점 어른이 되나봐; Jeomjeom eoreuni doenabwa [lit. I Must be Growing Up])	Agust D; El Capitxn; Hiss Noise	El Capitxn; Hiss Noise	2:14
6.	"Burn It" (featuring Max)	Agust D; Ghstloop; Max	Agust D; Ghstloop	3:13
7.	"People" (사람; Saram)	Agust D; Pdogg	Agust D; Pdogg	3:17
8.	"Honsool" (혼술; [lit. "Drinking Alone"])	Agust D; Pdogg	Agust D; Pdogg	3:40
9.	"Interlude: Set Me Free"	Agust D; Pdogg	Agust D; Pdogg	2:21
10.	"Dear My Friend" (featuring Kim Jong-wan) (어땠을까; Eottaesseulkka [lit. What Would've It Been Like])	Agust D; El Capitxn; Kim Jong-wan	Agust D; El Capitxn; Kim Jong-wan	4:53
Total length:				32:28

== Charts ==
Chart performance for D-2
Chart (2020)	Peak position
Australian Albums (ARIA)	2
Austrian Albums (Ö3 Austria)	4
Belgian Albums (Ultratop Flanders)	12
Belgian Albums (Ultratop Wallonia)	15
Canadian Albums (Billboard)	12
Czech Albums (ČNS IFPI)	29
Danish Albums (Hitlisten)	32
Dutch Albums (Album Top 100)	16
Estonian Albums (Eesti Ekspress)	1
Finnish Albums (Suomen virallinen lista)	4
French Albums (SNEP)	32
Hungarian Albums (MAHASZ)	9
Irish Albums (Official Charts)	10
Italian Albums (FIMI)	24
Japanese Combined Albums (Oricon)	14
Japanese Hot Albums (Billboard Japan)	7
Lithuanian Albums (AGATA)	1
New Zealand Albums (RMNZ)	10
Norwegian Albums (VG-lista)	7
Scottish Albums (Official Charts)	6
Swedish Albums (Sverigetopplistan)	19
Swiss Albums (Schweizer Hitparade)	5
UK Albums (Official Charts)	7
US Billboard 200	11
US World Albums (Billboard)	1
US Independent Albums (Billboard)	1
US Top Rap Albums (Billboard)	9

=== Year-end lists ===
Critics' rankings for D-2
Publication	Accolade	Rank	Ref.
Genius	50 Best Albums of 2020	18	
SCMP	The best K-pop solo albums of 2020	—N/a	

Critics' rankings for D-2 tracks
Publication	Track	Accolade	Rank	Ref.
Paper	Daechwita	The 40 Best K-pop Songs of 2020	18	
Amazon Music	Daechwita	Best of 2020: K-Pop	52	
Genius	Dear My Friend	Favorite Songs Of 2020	—N/a	

== Release history ==
Release history for D-2
Region	Date	Format	Label
Various	May 22, 2020	Streaming; digital download	Big Hit
