= Girl of My Dreams (Juice Wrld and Suga song) =

Promotional single by Juice Wrld and Suga

from the album Fighting Demons
- Language: English; Korean
- Released: December 10, 2021
- Recorded: 2019
- Length: 3:46
- Label: Grade A; Interscope
- Songwriters: Jarad Higgins; Min Yoon-gi; J. Aujla; Karim El-Ziftawi; Joshua Jaramillo; Max Lord
- Producers: Jaegen; Kookoo; Josh J; Max Lord

"Girl of My Dreams" is an English and Korean song by American rapper Juice WRLD and South Korean rapper Suga of BTS. The track was released as a standalone digital release on December 10, 2021, serving as the first promotional single from Juice Wrld's fourth and second posthumous studio album, Fighting Demons (2021). It serves as the second collaboration between Juice Wrld and Suga from BTS, with the two having collaborated previously on the 2019 single "All Night" from the soundtrack album BTS World: Original Soundtrack (2019).

== Background and release ==
The first collaboration between Juice Wrld and Suga from BTS occurred in June 2019 on the single "All Night" from the soundtrack album BTS World: Original Soundtrack (2019). In July 2021, a snippet of track was previewed on Instagram by co-founder of Grade A productions Lil Bibby. The song being a collaboration with Suga of BTS was announced upon the track list release of its parent album on December 9, 2021. "Girl of My Dreams" was then released on Juice Wrld's 999 Club website shop as a standalone digital single on the album's release of December 10, 2021, serving as the album's first promotional single. This song is produced by Jaegen (known for producing "Unforgettable" by French Montana & Swae Lee), kookoo, Josh J, as well as Max Lord (Juice WRLD's close friend & recording engineer). The track earned both Juice Wrld and Suga their first individual number one placement on the Billboard Digital Song Sales chart.

== Lyrics ==
The song is written in both English and Korean. The song's lyrics depict Juice Wrld falling in love with someone and Suga of BTS singing about their eventual breakup due to the love between the couple being taken for granted. Juice Wrld in the song also references John Legend's 2013 hit single "All of Me" in the first verse and chorus of the track.

== Charts ==
Chart performance for "Girl of My Dreams"
Chart (2021–2022)	Peak position
Australia (ARIA)	84
Australia Hip Hop/R&B (ARIA)	22
Canada Hot 100 (Billboard)	56
Global 200 (Billboard)	37
Greece (IFPI)	76
Hungary (Single Top 40)	10
Ireland (IRMA)	68
Lithuania (AGATA)	55
New Zealand Hot Singles (RMNZ)	3
Portugal (AFP)	90
US Billboard Hot 100	29
US Hot R&B/Hip-Hop Songs (Billboard)	3
Vietnam (Vietnam Hot 100)	38

=== Year-end charts ===
2022 year-end chart performance for "Girl of My Dreams"
Chart (2022)	Position
US Digital Song Sales (Billboard)	61

== Certifications ==
Region	Certification	Certified units/sales
Brazil (Pro-Música Brasil)	Gold	20,000^{‡}
^{‡} Sales+streaming figures based on certification alone.

== Release history ==
Release dates and formats for "Girl of My Dreams"
Region	Date	Format	Label	Ref.
Various	December 10, 2021	Digital download; streaming	Grade A; Interscope	

== See also ==
- List of Billboard Digital Song Sales number ones of 2021
