= Lee So-ra (singer) =

South Korean ballad singer (born 1969)

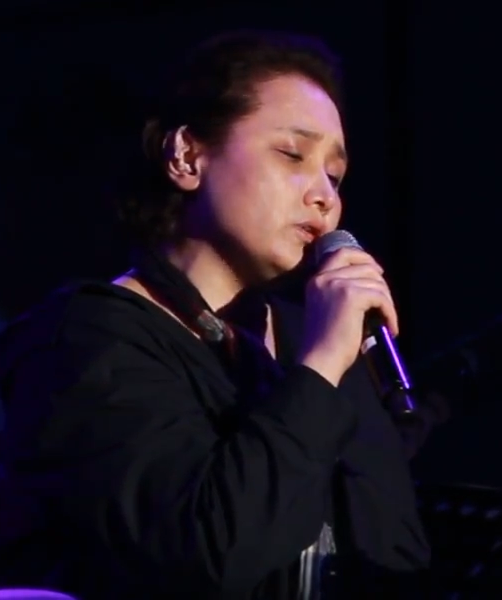
- Lee in June 2018

Background information
- Born: December 29, 1969 (age 56); Busan, South Korea
- Genres: Ballad, jazz
- Occupation: Singer
- Years active: 1993–present
- Website: leesora.net at the Wayback Machine (archived November 2, 2013)

Korean name
- Hangul: 이소라
- RR: I Sora
- MR: I Sora

Lee So-ra (Korean: 이소라; born December 29, 1969) is a South Korean ballad singer. She made her debut in 1993 as a member of the jazz group Strange People, and she released her first solo album in 1995. She has won multiple awards at the Korean Music Awards, and her sixth album, Nunsseopdal, was included on a list of the 100 greatest Korean albums.

Lee also hosted the music talk show, Lee Sora's Proposal on KBS from 1996 until 2002.

== Discography ==
=== Studio albums ===
| Title | Album details | Peak chart positions | Sales |
| Title | Album details | KOR | Sales |
|---|---|---|---|
| Lee So-ra Vol. 1 | Released: September 1, 1995; Label: Donga Entertainment; Formats: CD, cassette | No data | No data |
| Like In A Movie (영화에서처럼) | Released: December 10, 1996; Label: Donga Entertainment; Formats: CD, cassette | No data | No data |
| About Sorrow And Anger (슬픔과 분노에 관한) | Released: May 1, 1998; Label: Donga Entertainment; Formats: CD, cassette | 9 | KOR: 238,470+ |
| Flower (꽃) | Released: December 18, 2000; Label: Synnara Music; Formats: CD, cassette | 4 | KOR: 272,332+ |
| Sora's Diary | Released: October 17, 2002; Label: Show Globe; Formats: CD, cassette | 6 | KOR: 130,061+ |
| Nunsseopdal (눈썹달) | Released: December 10, 2004; Label: Seiren; Formats: CD, cassette | 6 | KOR: 63,463+ |
| Lee So-ra | Released: December 18, 2008; Label: Seiren; Formats: CD | No data | No data |
| 8 | Released: April 11, 2014; Label: Seiren; Formats: CD, digital download | 2 | KOR: 12,759+ |

=== Compilation albums ===
| Title | Album details | Peak chart positions | Sales |
| Title | Album details | KOR | Sales |
|---|---|---|---|
| Lee So-ra Best | Released: November 22, 1999; Label: Donga Entertainment; Formats: CD, cassette | 27 | KOR: 27,148+ |
| Lee So-ra Live | Released: January 5, 2001; Label: Donga Entertainment; Formats: CD, cassette | 27 | KOR: 24,816+ |
| My One And Only Love (cover album) | Released: October 21, 2010; Label: Seiren; Formats: CD, digital download | 10 | —N/a |

=== Singles ===
| Title | Year | Peak chart positions | | | | Album | Sales |
| Title | Year | KOR | | HUN Single | US World | Album | Sales |
| Title | Year | Gaon | Hot 100 | HUN Single | US World | Album | Sales |
|---|---|---|---|---|---|---|---|
| "October Lover" feat. Roy Kim | 2018 | — | — | — | — | Non-album singles | —N/a |
| "Song Request" (신청곡) feat. Suga | 2019 | 3 | 9 | 37 | 2 | Non-album singles | US: 3,000 |
"—" denotes release did not chart
