= Agust D =

Mixtape by Agust D
- Released: August 15, 2016
- Recorded: 2011–2016
- Genre: Hip hop
- Length: 28:13
- Language: Korean
- Label: Big Hit
- Producer: Agust D

Agust D chronology
Agust D (2016)	D-2 (2020)

Singles from Agust D
- 1. "Agust D" Released: August 15, 2016; 2. "Give It to Me" Released: August 18, 2016

Agust D is the debut mixtape by the South Korean rapper of the same name, better known as Suga of BTS. It was released on August 15, 2016, by Big Hit Entertainment on SoundCloud.

== Background and development ==
Prior to launching his career as the rapper Suga of South Korean boy band BTS, Agust D began writing music lyrics and working with MIDI at age 13 and held a part-time job composing and arranging music at a recording studio at age 17. Active under the name "Gloss" as an underground rapper, Agust D originally entered Big Hit Entertainment as a producer in 2010 and trained under Big Hit Entertainment for three years alongside members J-Hope and RM before making his debut as a member of BTS in 2013. In the initial years of his career in BTS, both he and his fellow group member RM faced criticism from the South Korean underground hip hop scene for "selling out" and becoming K-pop idols.

Between his commitments as a member of BTS, Agust D took advantage of time on the plane and in hotel rooms after concerts to continuously produce and compose music. In an interview for Grazia Korea, Agust D expressed a desire to release the music he wanted to do without having to consider popular appeal or music ranking. He intended to release his music for free in the form of a mixtape to avoid such considerations, commenting that an album "has a feeling of being trapped in some sort of framework" due to the need for company involvement in promotion and advertising. Developing Agust D musically on the base of hip hop, much of Agust D's inspiration for the lyrics came from his own stories of dream, youth, and reality.

In order to differentiate his work from that of his work as Suga, he developed the alter ego "Agust D", which is derived from the initials DT, short for his birthplace, Daegu Town, and "Suga" spelled backwards. Steadily accumulating songs in his career, Agust D utilized a number of songs composed as early as 2011 to as late as a month before release to create his mixtape. The release of Agust D followed RM's self-titled mixtape RM (2015) and the success of BTS' first compilation album The Most Beautiful Moment in Life: Young Forever (2016) and The Most Beautiful Moment in Life On Stage: Epilogue Tour.

== Music and lyrics ==
The final cut of Agust D comprises ten tracks on SoundCloud and eight tracks on streaming and download services. Critics viewed Agust D as a major departure from his previous catalog as a member of BTS with a hardcore rap style highlighting his underground influences. Billboard and Fuse complimented the album's divergence from his contemporaries in K-pop with its vulnerability and Agust D's self-production.

In Agust D, Agust D exposed his inner thoughts on his beginnings to his rise to stardom. "Intro; Dt sugA", showcasing the style of classic turntablism hip hop, preceded the self-introduction track "Agust D" which utilized fast and precise rap techniques over "deep and intense bass" to underscore his confidence and self-identity. "Give It to Me" launched into "full-on disses" towards his detractors and the subsequent "Skit" explored the duality of Agust D and Suga "as a human being and as a musician". While "724148" reflected on the meaning of "success" and Agust D's beginnings in his hometown of Daegu, the track "140503 at Dawn", composed of minimal beats, reflected on his underlying vulnerability in the early morning before transitioning into the track "The Last" which utilized dramatic beats and rap techniques to portray his soul consumed by depression, obsession, and self-hatred following the pursuit of his dream in Seoul. In "Tony Montana", Agust D took on the character of Tony Montana from the 1983 film Scarface to ruminate on the nature of success, ambition, and envy. The lyrics of "Interlude: Dream, Reality" consisted of only the word "dream", leading into the final track "So Far Away" which reflected on the essence of the word "dream" while urging his listeners to continue dreaming.

== Release ==
On July 29, 2016, Agust D's release date was confirmed to be in August. On August 15, it was released on SoundCloud and for free download via links on Twitter in conjunction with a music video for "Agust D". On August 18, Agust D released a follow-up music video for "Give It to Me". Aside from interviewing for Grazia Korea and Marie Claire Korea, Agust D did not further promote the mixtape. Fuse later ranked it at #16 on their list of the 20 best mixtapes of 2016.

In February 2018, the mixtape was rereleased for digital purchase and streaming sans its first two tracks, "Intro: DT sugA" and "Agust D". Both tracks became available on download and streaming platforms worldwide in April 2023, after finally receiving clearance for the sample of James Brown's "It's a Man's Man's Man's World" used in them. The mixtape itself was also released on South Korean music platforms for the first time; it was previously only available domestically through Spotify.

== Commercial performance ==
The 2018 reissue of Agust D reached number three on Billboard's World Albums Chart, number five on the Heatseekers Albums chart, and number 74 on the Top Album Sales chart. Agust D entered the Emerging Artists chart for the first time, on the issue for the week of March 3, at number 46.

The mixtape entered the Oricon Digital Albums Chart in Japan for the first time in April 2023, at number five, selling 1,443 copies during the period dated April 3–9. It sold an additional 147 copies the following week.

== Track listing ==
No.	Title	Writer(s)	Producer(s)	Length
1.	"Intro: DT sugA" (featuring DJ Friz)	Agust D; Pdogg; Betty Jean Newsome; James Brown	Agust D; Pdogg	1:04
2.	"Agust D"	Agust D; Betty Jean Newsome; James Brown	Agust D	3:54
3.	"Give It to Me"	Agust D	Agust D	2:29
4.	"Skit"	Agust D	Agust D	1:14
5.	"724148" (치리사일사팔)	Agust D	Agust D	3:05
6.	"140503 at Dawn" (140503 새벽에)	Agust D; Slow Rabbit	Agust D; Slow Rabbit	1:24
7.	"The Last" (마지막)	Agust D; June; Pdogg	Agust D; June; Pdogg	4:05
8.	"Tony Montana" (featuring Yankie)	Agust D; Pdogg; Supreme Boi; Yankie	Agust D; Pdogg; Supreme Boi	3:28
9.	"Interlude: Dream, Reality"	Agust D; Slow Rabbit	Agust D; Slow Rabbit	1:32
10.	"So Far Away" (featuring Suran)	Agust D; Slow Rabbit	Agust D; Slow Rabbit	5:58
Total length:				28:13

Sample credits

- "Intro: Dt sugA" and "Agust D" contain a sample of "It's a Man's Man's Man's World" as performed by James Brown.

== Personnel ==
The following people are credited on the album:

=== Musicians ===
- Agust D – keyboard (tracks 2, 3, 5, 8, 10), synthesizer (tracks 2, 3, 5, 8, 10), gang vocal (track 2)
- Dj Friz – scratch (track 1)
- RM – gang vocal (track 2)
- J-Hope – gang vocal (track 2)
- Pdogg – synthesizer (tracks 7, 8), gang vocal (track 2), keyboard (track 7)
- 정수완 – guitar (tracks 7, 10)
- June – rhythm programming (track 7)
- Supreme Boi – keyboard (track 8)
- Slow Rabbit – synthesizer (tracks 9, 10), keyboard (track 10)
- Suran – chorus (track 10)
- Jungkook – chorus (track 10)

=== Technical and production ===
- Agust D – producer (tracks 1, 2, 3, 4, 5, 6, 7, 8, 9, 10), recording engineer (tracks 5, 6, 7, 8, 10)
- Alex DeYoung – mastering engineer (tracks 1, 2, 3, 4, 5, 6, 7, 8, 9, 10)
- Dj Friz – recording engineer (track 1)
- Pdogg – recording engineer (tracks 2, 3, 7, 10), mix engineer (track 1)
- Yang Ga – mix engineer (tracks 2, 3, 5, 9, 10)
- 김보성 – mix engineer (tracks 4, 6, 7, 8)
- Supreme Boi – producer (track 7)
- Slow Rabbit – producer (tracks 9, 10)
- 정우영 – recording engineer (track 10)

== Charts ==
Chart performance for Agust D
Chart (2023)	Peak position
Japanese Digital Albums (Oricon)	5
Japanese Hot Albums (Billboard Japan)	8

== Release history ==
Agust D release history
Region	Date	Format	Label	Ref.
Various	August 15, 2016	Streaming; digital download	Big Hit Entertainment	
