= Suga =

South Korean rapper (born 1993)

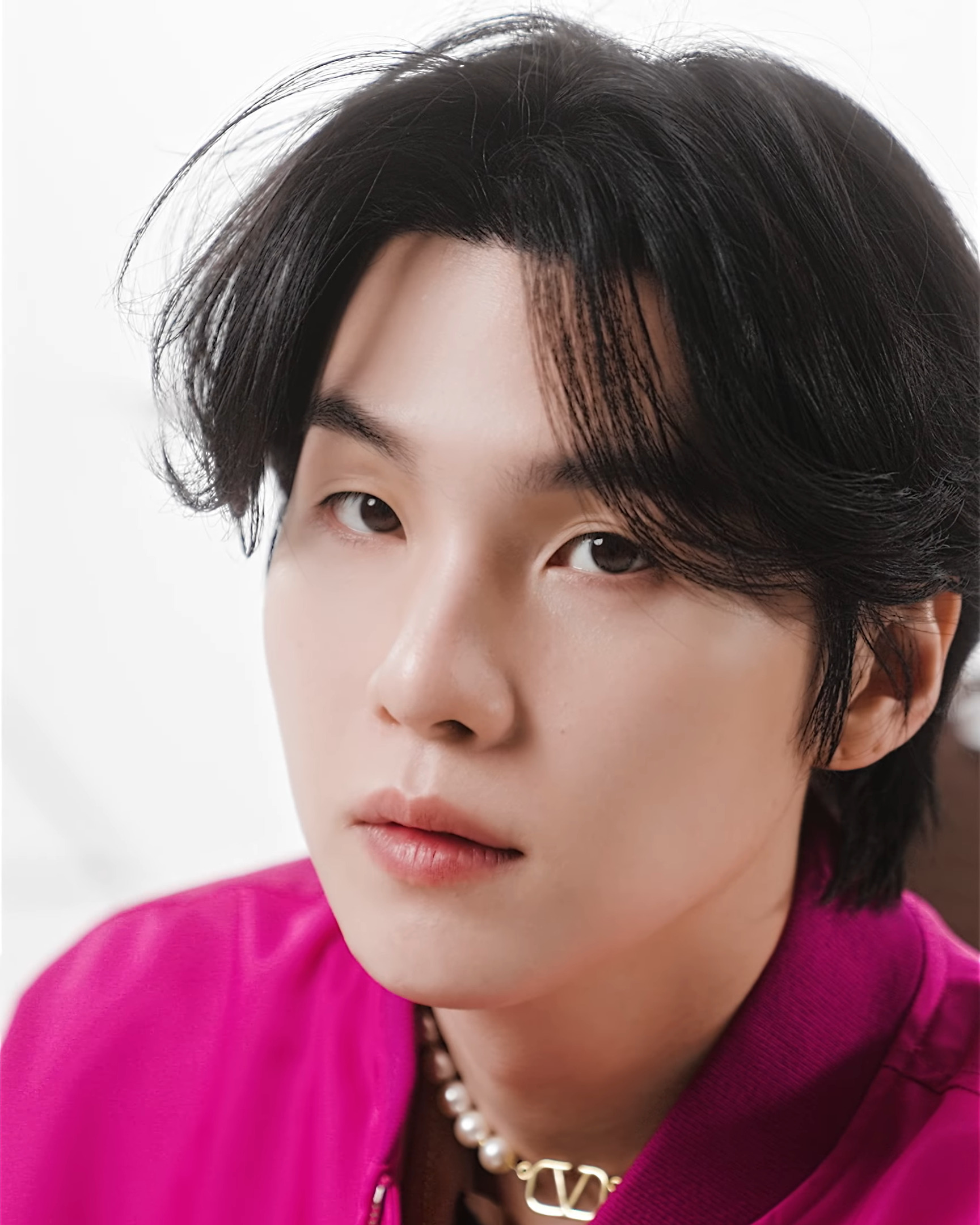
- Suga in 2023
- Born: Min Yoon-gi; March 9, 1993 (age 33); Daegu, South Korea
- Education: Global Cyber University
- Occupations: Rapper; songwriter; record producer
- Years active: 2010–present
- Works: Discography; Songs written; Songs produced
- Honours: Hwagwan Order of Cultural Merit (2018)
- Musical career
- Also known as: Agust D
- Genres: Hip-hop; K-pop; R&B
- Instrument: Vocals
- Label: Big Hit
- Member of: BTS

Korean name
- Hangul: 민윤기
- Hanja: 閔玧其
- RR: Min Yungi
- MR: Min Yun'gi

Stage name
- Hangul: 슈가
- RR: Syuga
- MR: Syuga
- IPA: ɕʰuɡa̠

Min Yoon-gi (Korean: 민윤기; born March 9, 1993), known professionally by his stage names Suga (슈가; [ɕʰuɡa̠]; stylized in all caps) and Agust D, (Note: When spelt backwards, it means 'D'aegu 'T'own Suga.) is a South Korean rapper, songwriter and record producer. He debuted as a member of the South Korean boy band BTS in June 2013 under Big Hit Entertainment. His first solo mixtape, Agust D, was released in 2016 and re-released in 2018 to digital download and streaming platforms, reaching number three on Billboard's World Albums Chart. In 2020, he released his second solo mixtape, D-2; it peaked at number 11 on the US Billboard 200, number seven on the UK Albums Chart, and number two on Australia's ARIA Album Chart.

Suga released his debut solo album, D-Day, in 2023. It debuted at number two on the US Billboard 200, tying him with BTS bandmate Jimin as the highest-charting South Korean solo artists of all time. A full member of the Korea Music Copyright Association, Suga has songwriting and production credits on over 160 songs, including Suran's "Wine", which peaked at number two on the Gaon Music Chart and won Best R&B at the 2017 Melon Music Awards.

== Early life and education ==
Min Yoon-gi was born on March 9, 1993, in Daegu, South Korea. The younger of two sons, he attended Taejeon Elementary School, Gwaneum Middle School, and Apgujeong High School. He is of the Yeoheung Min clan.

In March 2019, after graduating from the Global Cyber University with a degree in Broadcasting and Entertainment, he enrolled at Hanyang Cyber University for the Master of Business Administration program in Advertising and Media.

== Career ==
=== 1993–2010: Beginnings ===
Suga became interested in rap after hearing "Ragga Muffin" by Stony Skunk, stating that it was different from anything he had ever heard before. After hearing Epik High, he decided to become a rapper.

By age 13, he began to write music lyrics and learned about MIDI. He worked a part-time job at a record studio by age 17. From then on, he began composing and arranging music, rapping, and performing. Before being signed, he was active under the name Gloss as an underground rapper. As part of the hip hop crew D-Town in 2010, he produced "518-062", a song commemorating the Gwangju Uprising.

=== 2013–present: BTS ===
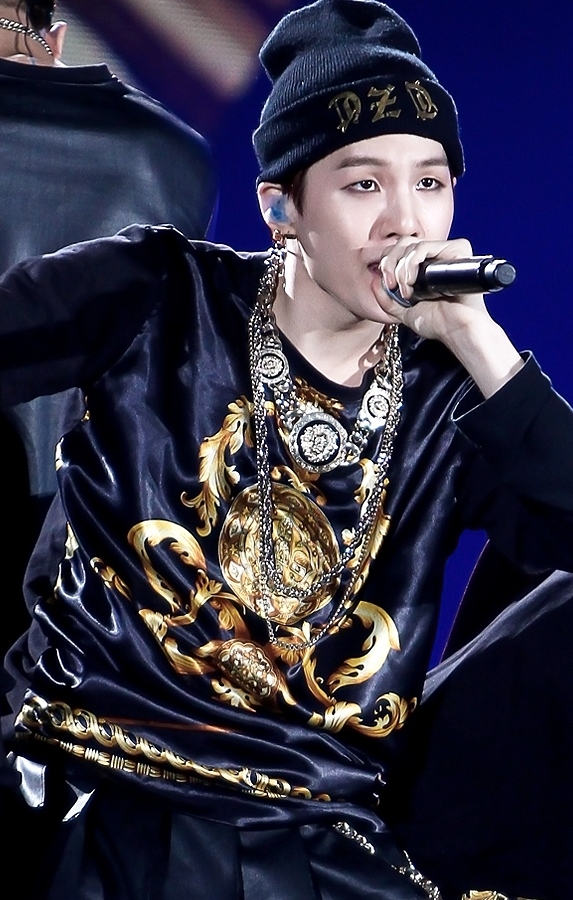
Suga performing in September 2013

Originally joining the company as a music producer, Suga trained under Big Hit Entertainment for three years alongside bandmates J-Hope and RM. He made his debut as a member of BTS on Mnet's M Countdown with the track "No More Dream" from their debut single album 2 Cool 4 Skool. He has produced and written lyrics for a variety of tracks on all of the band's albums.

Suga wrote and performed the introductory track "Intro: The Most Beautiful Moment in Life" for BTS' third Korean-language extended play (EP) The Most Beautiful Moment in Life, Pt. 1 (2015). Released on April 17, (Note: April 18 KST) in the form of an animated music video, its lyrics addressed fears associated with reaching adulthood at the end of one's adolescent years through the use of a sports metaphor. Pt. 1's follow up EP, The Most Beautiful Moment in Life, Pt. 2, featured another introduction performed by Suga, called "Intro: Never Mind", that recounted his teenage years. The track preceded the EP on November 15. It was later included as the opener on BTS' 2016 compilation album The Most Beautiful Moment in Life: Young Forever. Suga did not perform another introductory track for BTS until 2020's "Interlude: Shadow", from the band's Map of the Soul: 7 album. Released ahead of the album on January 10, the rap track referenced "Intro: O!RUL8,2?" from the 2013 EP of the same name and discussed BTS' fame, comparing its reality to the celebrity about which O!RUL8,2? dreamed; Tamar Herman of Billboard described the interlude as "evocative, yet brash", noting in particular how its sound changes midway through to show "this dichotomy between the relationship of how fame and audiences watching him affects his idea of self".

Under BTS' name, Suga has released two solo songs. The first is an autobiographical track titled "First Love", that appeared on the band's 2016 studio album Wings. Reminiscent of a monologue, the song is a rap serenade to Suga's childhood piano that personifies his relationship with the instrument as if addressing a friend. The second is "Trivia: Seesaw", about the up-and-down nature of falling in love, which he performed for BTS' 2018 compilation album Love Yourself: Answer.

In 2018, Suga was awarded the fifth-class Hwagwan Order of Cultural Merit, alongside his bandmates, by then President of South Korea Moon Jae-in, for their contributions to the promotion of Korean culture. He was appointed Special Presidential Envoy for Future Generations and Culture by Moon in July 2021, again alongside his bandmates, to help "lead the global agenda for future generations" and "expand South Korea's diplomatic efforts and global standing" in the international community.

=== 2016–present: Solo career ===
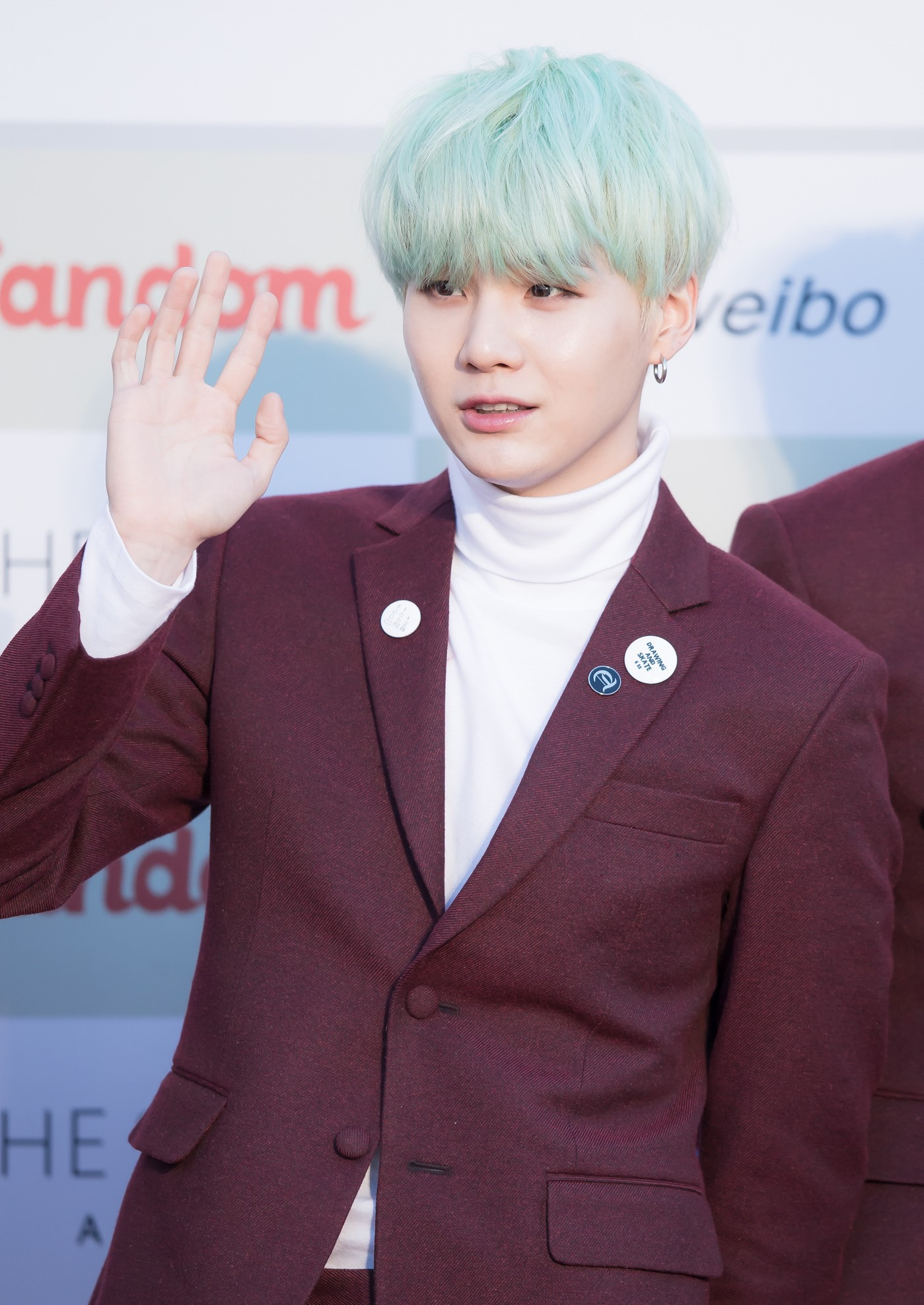
Suga at the 2016 Gaon Chart Awards

Suga released a free self-titled mixtape via SoundCloud on August 15, 2016. He decided against releasing the project as a commercial studio album, describing it as the "feeling of being trapped in some sort of framework." On the record, he discussed his struggles with depression and social phobia, among other topics. Fuse TV rated it one of the top 20 mixtapes of 2016. The following year, Suga composed the song "Wine" for singer Suran, with whom he had previously worked on a song for his mixtape. At Suga's studio, Suran heard a rough draft of "Wine" and asked Suga for the song. The record peaked at number two on the Gaon Digital Chart in South Korea and won the Best R&B genre award at the Melon Music Awards on December 2, 2017. Suga also received the Hot Trend Award for his work on the track. Suga made his first mixtape available on digital download and streaming platforms in February 2018. The reissued project reached number three on Billboard's World Albums Chart, number five on the Heatseekers Albums chart, and number 74 on the Top Album Sales chart in the United States. Suga, as Agust D, reached number 46 on the Emerging Artists chart for the week of March 3.

In January 2019, Suga provided a rap feature on Lee So-ra's single "Song Request". The track was co-written by Suga and Tablo of Epik High, who also produced the track. The single debuted at number three on the Gaon Digital Chart, and number two on Billboard's World Digital Song Sales chart, with 3,000 downloads during the song's first two days of availability. Suga later produced the track "Eternal Sunshine" for Epik High's Sleepless in extended play, which was released in February. He co-wrote and produced the digital single "We Don't Talk Together" for singer Heize, which she released on July 7. In December, American singer-songwriter Halsey released the song "Suga's Interlude", from her third studio album Manic, which both featured and was produced by Suga.

On May 6, 2020, IU released the digital single "Eight" featuring and produced by Suga. The song debuted at number one on both the Gaon Digital and World Digital Song Sales charts. Suga released his second mixtape, D-2, together with the music video for its lead single "Daechwita", on May 22; the single peaked at number 76 on the US Billboard Hot 100. The mixtape debuted at number 11 on the Billboard 200 and became the highest-charting album by a Korean soloist in the US at the time. It also became the first Korean solo release to reach the top 10 in the United Kingdom, opening at number seven on the UK Albums Chart.

In 2021, Suga re-composed Samsung's signature ringtone, "Over The Horizon". The track was unveiled on August 11 as part of Samsung's "Unpacked 2021" event. He also produced the single "You" for Japanese singer ØMI, which was released on October 15. In December, Suga featured on the single "Girl of My Dreams" from American rapper Juice Wrld's posthumous album Fighting Demons. The single debuted at number 29 on the Billboard Hot 100, earning Suga his second entry on the chart as a solo artist. He next co-wrote, produced, and featured on the song "That That" with Psy, which was released on April 29, 2022, as the lead single from the singer's eighth studio album Psy 9th. That December, Suga launched the talk show web series Suchwita (Note: Time to Drink with Suga) on YouTube; he candidly interviews guests over drinks each episode.

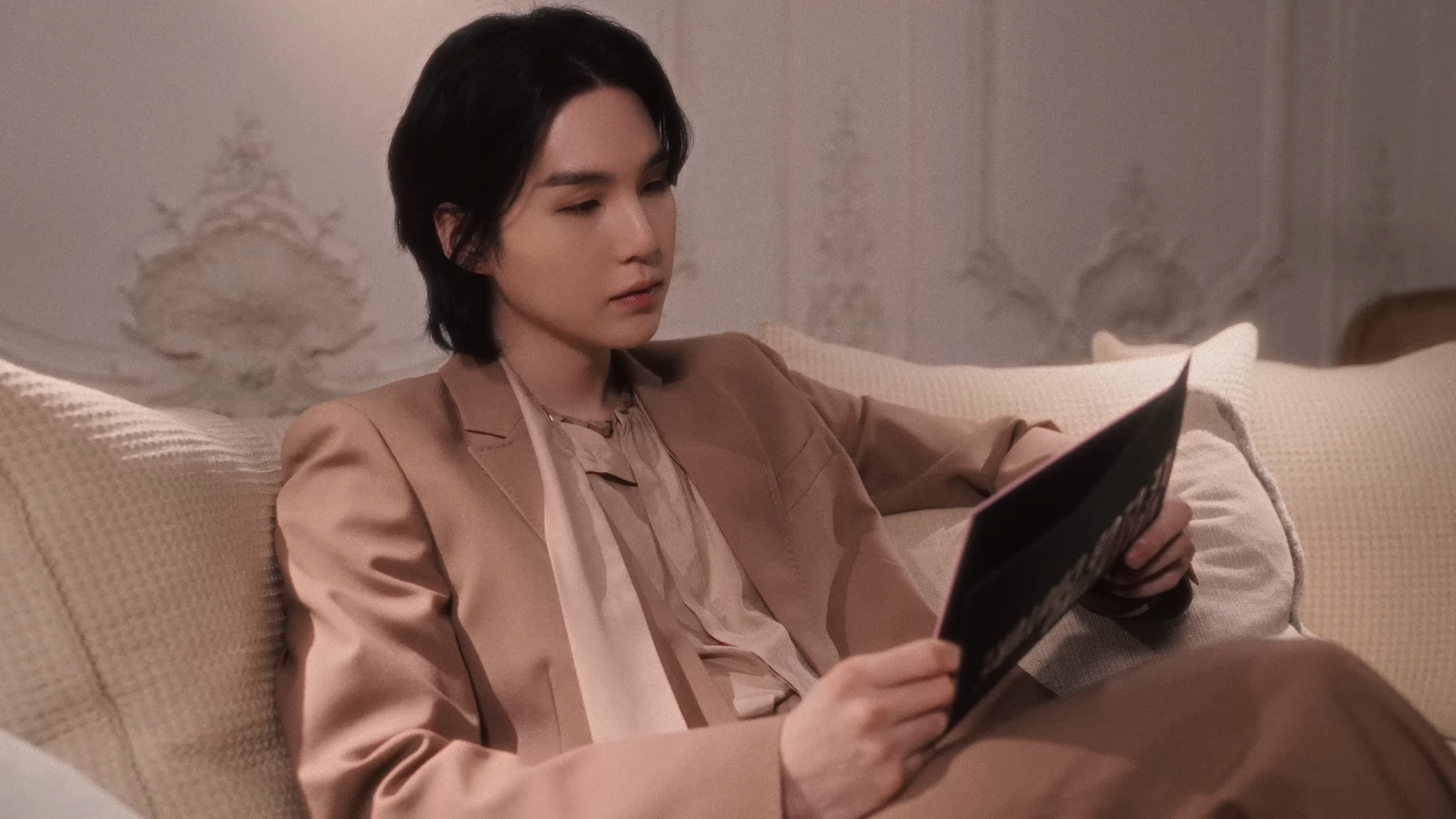
Suga for Valentino in 2023

Suga was announced as a brand ambassador for Valentino and the face of the Maison Valentino Essentials campaign for the brand's menswear staples in January 2023, and as an ambassador for the NBA in April. His debut solo album D-Day, was released on April 21 under his Agust D alias. Featuring the singles "People Pt. 2" and "Haegeum", the album debuted at number two on the Billboard 200, Suga's first top-10 entry on the ranking, tying him with bandmate Jimin as the highest-charting South Korean solo artists in the history of the chart. A Disney+ documentary, titled Suga: Road to D-Day, chronicling the project's creation and following the rapper on a music road trip across different countries, premiered the same day as the album. Suga also hosted a five-episode radio show, Agust D Radio, weekly on Apple Music in promotion of D-Day; the premiere episode aired on April 17. He embarked on the D-Day Tour, his first solo world tour, the following week, playing several shows in the US, followed by visits to Indonesia, Thailand, Singapore, South Korea, and Japan. On October 6, 2023, Suga's song from Agust D, "The Last" surpassed 100 million streams on Spotify making him the fifth leading Korean artist with the most songs over 100 million streams.

== Name ==
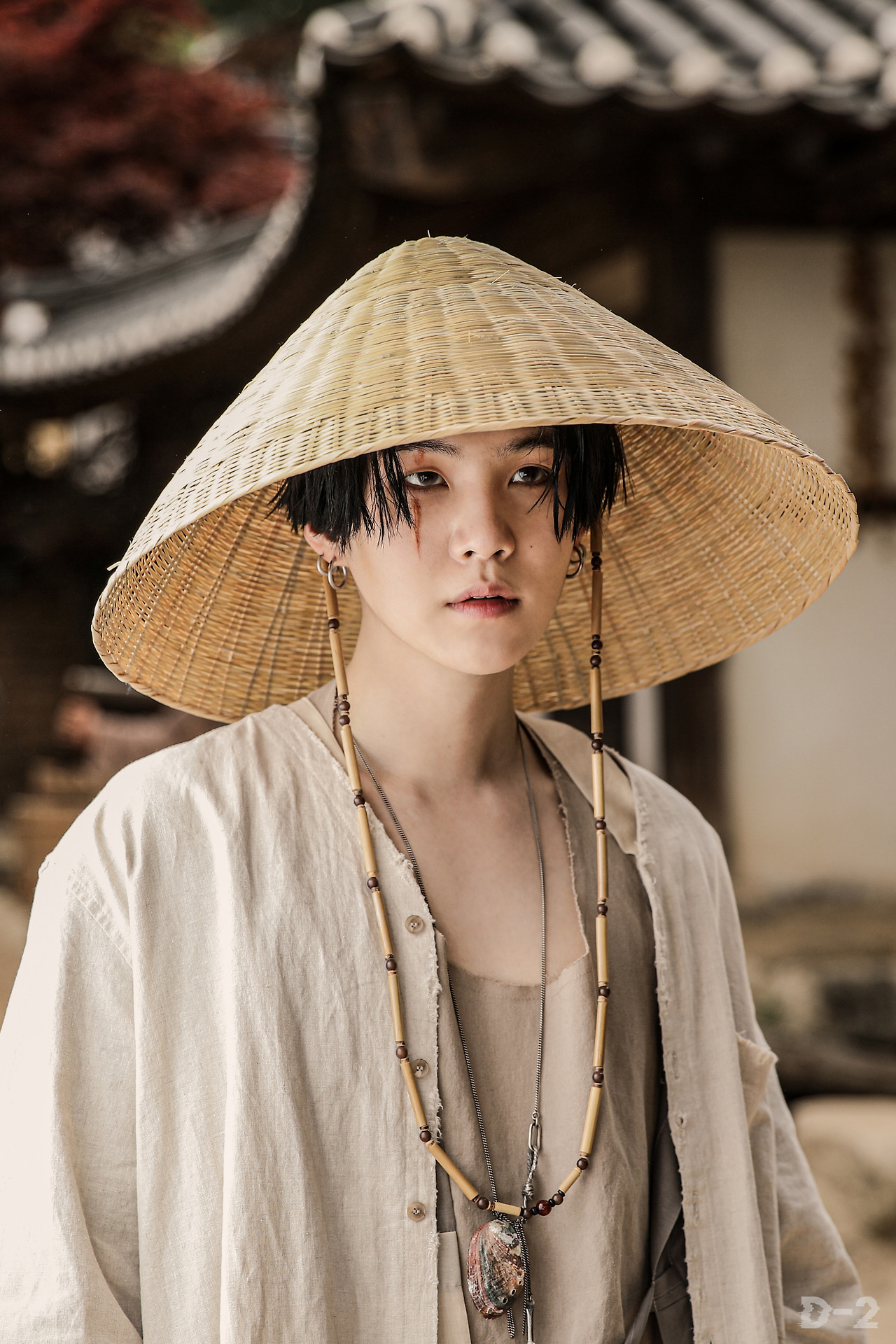
Suga filming the music video for "Daechwita", released under the moniker Agust D

The stage name Suga (슈가) was inspired by legendary boxing champion Sugar Ray Leonard. For years, he told fans and the media that it stood for the first syllables of the term "shooting guard" (슈팅 가드), his favourite basketball position, because its real origin was "too much of a chore" to explain. He adopted the alias Agust D in 2016 for his mixtape, which is derived from the initials DT for his birthplace, Daegu Town, and "Suga", spelled backwards.

== Artistry ==
Suga writes, composes, arranges, mixes, and masters his own material. Over 160 registered songs are credited to him by the Korea Music Copyright Association. He plays piano and produces mainly hip hop and R&B music. His lyrics involve themes that are "full of dreams and hope," conceived with the intent of his music becoming "many people's strength." He cites Stony Skunk and Epik High as his inspirations to pursue hip hop music. Particularly, he credits the former's reggae-hip hop hybrid album Ragga Muffin (2005) and its title track for igniting his interest in the genre.

Jeff Benjamin of Fuse said that Suga's mixtape "showcases the star's ear for hot productions, hardcore rap style, and how he can make his vulnerabilities a strength." Other critics stated that Suga's "storytelling execution in the music he creates tears down the barrier of censoring and sugarcoating".

In January 2018, Suga was promoted to a full member of the Korea Music Copyright Association.

=== Reception ===
In 2017, Suga was ranked the 13th most preferred idol of the year in a survey conducted by Gallup Korea. He ranked seventh in 2018 and ninth in 2019.

== Personal life ==
In 2018, Suga purchased a ₩3.4 billion (equivalent to ₩4 billion or US$2.99 million in 2025) apartment and as of 2019, lives in Hannam-dong, Seoul, South Korea.

=== Health ===
Suga was diagnosed with appendicitis, and underwent surgery at Severance Hospital in Sinchon on December 9, 2013. He was discharged on the December 17 but was re-hospitalized on December 26 due to inflammation of the surgical site. Consequently, he was unable to attend year-end music festivals.

In December 2016, Suga suffered an ear injury after tripping over a door threshold. Following doctor recommendations, he took a one-week break from performing and participating in choreography (including at year-end festivals) to ensure the wound healed properly.

In November 2020, Suga underwent surgery to repair a torn labrum (reverse Bankart tear) in his left shoulder and announced that he would be taking a break from subsequent promotional activities in order to fully recover. He resumed activities in January 2021, beginning with a performance with BTS at the 35th Golden Disc Awards.

=== Military service ===
Following revisions made to the Military Service Act in December 2020, all members of BTS were granted an automatic postponement of their mandatory military service in 2021 until the end of 2022. On August 7, 2023, subsequent to the completion of his world tour, Big Hit announced through Weverse that Suga had applied for the termination of his postponement in order to begin the enlistment process and carry out his service. He began his military service on September 22, as a social worker. Suga was discharged on June 21, 2025.

=== DUI incident ===
On the night of August 6, 2024, Suga was driving an electric scooter in Hannam-dong, Seoul, when he fell and was recognized by a police officer who detected alcohol. After being breathtested and found to have an elevated blood alcohol level, he was fined and his license was revoked. Multiple news outlets reported that his BAC was 0.227%, nearly eight times South Korea's legal limit, however, this was not confirmed by police. He and his label both issued statements for the situation, in which he said he had been drinking at a meal, and he apologized. On August 8, the police announced that they were investigating Suga on charges of violating South Korea's Road Traffic Act. The Military Manpower Administration stated they would not address the matter separately, as the incident was a personal issue that happened outside of working hours. On September 10, the Seoul Southern District Prosecutors Office proceeded with a summary indictment of Suga for the incident, a process used for minor offenses that allows for expedited penalties without a full trial. Suga plead guilty to the charges, and on September 30, was sentenced to a fine of ₩15 million (US$11,192) by the Seoul Western District Court, a decision that matched the prosecutors' request.

== Philanthropy and activism ==
On his 25th birthday, Suga donated beef to 39 orphanages in the name of "ARMY", BTS' fanbase, in fulfillment of a promise he made in 2014 to buy his fans meat should he find success as a musical artist. The following year, for his 26th birthday, he donated ₩100 million (equivalent to ₩117 million or US$87,468 in 2025) and 329 BT21 Shooky dolls to the Korea Pediatric Cancer Foundation. In February 2020, Suga donated ₩100 million (equivalent to ₩117 million or US$87,001 in 2025) to the Hope Bridge National Disaster Relief Association to help prevention and relief efforts in his hometown of Daegu, one of the cities most affected by the coronavirus outbreak in South Korea at the time. He donated another ₩100 million (equivalent to ₩114 million or US$84,880 in 2025) in March 2021, to Daegu's Keimyung University Dongsan Hospital to support child cancer patients unable to access treatment due to financial difficulties.

On March 9, 2022, in celebration of his 29th birthday, Suga donated ₩100 million (US$74,611) to the Hope Bridge Disaster Relief Association to help victims of the extensive wildfires along the country's eastern coastal area. On March 9, 2023, he donated ₩100 million (US$74,611) to the Korean Save the Children, for the purchase of blankets, mattresses, and school supplies for children in southern Turkey and northern Syria. In March 2025, Suga donated ₩100 million (US$74,611) to the Korean Red Cross for wildfire relief efforts due to wildfire damages in the Ulsan, Gyeongbuk, and Gyeongnam regions.

In June 2025, Suga donated ₩5 billion (US$4 million) to Severance Hospital to establish a treatment center for children with autism. At the center, named the Min Yoongi Center in Suga's honor, he has worked as a volunteer music instructor. With the center's director and research team, Suga is a co-author of MIND Program (마인드 프로그램), a clinical manual for the use of music in a social skills therapy program for children and adolescents with autism.

Suga has spoken openly about mental health, sharing his experiences with depression through his music, and has tried to normalize conversations around the topic. He has also supported equality for the LGBTQ+ community.

== Discography ==
Studio albums

- D-Day (2023)

Mixtapes

- Agust D (2016)
- D-2 (2020)

== Tours ==
- D-Day Tour (2023)

== Accolades ==
=== Awards and nominations ===
Name of the award ceremony, year presented, nominee(s) of the award, award category, and the result of the nomination
Award ceremony	Year	Category	Nominee(s)/work(s)	Result	Ref.
Asia Artist Awards	2026	Popularity Award – Solo (Male)	Suga	Pending	
Billboard Music Awards	2023	Top K-pop Touring Artist	Suga	Nominated	
Circle Chart Music Awards	2021	Digital Music – May	"Eight" (with IU)	Won	
Circle Chart Music Awards	2023	Global Digital Music – April	"That That" (with Psy)	Nominated	
The Fact Music Awards	2023	Best Music – Summer	"Haegeum"	Nominated	
The Fact Music Awards	2023	IdolPlus Popularity Award	Agust D	Nominated	
Golden Disc Awards	2023	Digital Song Bonsang	"That That" (with Psy)	Won	
Golden Disc Awards	2024	Album Bonsang	D-Day	Nominated	
Grammy Awards	2023	Album of the Year (Note: as songwriter)	Music of the Spheres	Nominated	
MAMA Awards	2019	Best Collaboration	"Song Request" (with Lee Sora)	Won	
MAMA Awards	2020	Best Collaboration	"Eight" (with IU)	Won	
MAMA Awards	2022	Best Collaboration	"That That" (with Psy)	Won	
MAMA Awards	2022	Best Dance Performance – Solo	"That That" (with Psy)	Won	
MAMA Awards	2022	Song of the Year	"That That" (with Psy)	Nominated	
MAMA Awards	2023	Best Rap & Hip Hop Performance	"People Pt. 2" (featuring IU)	Won	
MAMA Awards	2023	Album of the Year	D-Day	Longlisted	
MAMA Awards	2023	Song of the Year	"People Pt. 2" (featuring IU)	Longlisted	
Melon Music Awards	2017	Hot Trend Award (Note: as producer)	"Wine"	Won	
Melon Music Awards	2020	Best Rock Award	"Eight" (with IU)	Won	
Melon Music Awards	2022	Song of the Year	"That That" (with Psy)	Nominated	
Melon Music Awards	2023	Millions Top 10	D-Day	Nominated	
Melon Music Awards	2023	Top 10 Artist Award	Suga	Nominated	
Seoul Music Awards	2023	Fan Choice of the Year – April	Suga	Nominated	
Universal Superstar Awards	2024	KM Chart Top 6 - Best K-Music Soundtrack	"People Pt. 2" (featuring IU)	Won	

=== Listicles ===
Name of publisher, year listed, name of listicle, and placement
Publisher	Year	Listicle	Placement	Ref.
Billboard	2024	K-Pop Artist 100	59th	
Forbes Korea	2026	Power Celebrity 40	18th	
