= BigHit Music =

South Korean entertainment company

BigHit Music Co., Ltd.
- Native name: 주식회사 빅히트뮤직
- Formerly: The Big Hit Entertainment Co., Ltd. (Note: February 4, 2025 – February 24, 2005); Big Hit Entertainment Co., Ltd. (Note: February 24, 2005 – March 30, 2021)
- Type: Private subsidiary
- Founded: February 4, 2005; 21 years ago; July 1, 2021; 5 years ago (Note: Spinoff of HYBE's label business division)
- Founder: Bang Si-hyuk
- Headquarters: 15F 42 Hangang-daero, Yongsan-gu, Seoul (Hangangno 3-ga, Yongsan Trade Center), South Korea
- Area served: Worldwide
- Key people: Shin Seon-jeong (CEO and president)
- Services: Music production; Artists management
- Revenue: ▲ ₩437.53 million (US$326,449.93) (2025)
- Net income: ▼ ₩32.7 million (US$24,394.98) (2025)
- Total assets: ▲ ₩466.53 million (US$348,088.01) (2025)
- Total equity: ▼ ₩193.71 million (US$144,529.19) (2025)
- Parent: Hybe Corporation
- Website: ibighit.com

BigHit Music Co., Ltd. (Korean: 주식회사 빅히트뮤직, stylized in all caps), formerly Big Hit Entertainment (Korean: 빅히트 엔터테인먼트), is a South Korean record label established in 2005 by Bang Si-hyuk.

In March 2021, it was announced the label business of Big Hit Entertainment would be spun off and re-branded as an independent label under a newly named Hybe Corporation (formerly Big Hit Entertainment Co., Ltd.).

As of date, the label is home to soloist Lee Hyun, and 3 boy groups BTS, Tomorrow X Together and Cortis. It previously managed soloist Lim Jeong-hee, and groups 8Eight, 2AM, and co-managed Glam.

== History ==
=== 2005–2021: Big Hit Entertainment ===
Big Hit Entertainment's logo from 2005 to 2021

Big Hit Entertainment was founded on February 1, 2005, and signed the trio 8Eight in 2007. In 2010, the company signed a joint management contract with JYP Entertainment over the boy group 2AM.

In 2012, the company signed Lim Jeong-hee, and formed the girl group Glam as a collaboration with Source Music. The group was active until 2014 when it was disbanded due to a controversy involving one of its members, Kim Da-hee—Kim was sentenced to prison after being found guilty of blackmailing actor Lee Byung-hun.

Following the end of the joint contract between Big Hit and JYP in April 2014, three members of 2AM returned to JYP, while Lee Chang-min remained with Big Hit in order to continue with his solo career and as part of the duo Homme. The year also saw the disbandment of 8Eight after Baek Chan and Joo Hee's contracts with Big Hit ended. In May 2015, Lim Jeong-hee parted ways with the agency, following the expiration of her three-year contract.

In February 2018, Homme disbanded after member Changmin's contract came to an end. He left the company to start his own agency, while Lee Hyun continued on as a solo artist. and Big Hit debuted its second male group, Tomorrow X Together (TXT), in March 2019.

=== 2021–present: BigHit Music ===
On March 19, 2021, Big Hit Entertainment announced that it had been renamed Hybe Corporation to emphasize its wider array of business units and ventures. With the change, the Big Hit record label was renamed BigHit Music . On April 1, 2021, Hybe announced through a board resolution that it would separate the label business (BigHit Music) from Hybe and establish a new company with 100% of the stake held by Hybe. On July 1, 2021, BigHit Music became a subsidiary of Hybe.

== Philanthropy ==
In January 2017, Big Hit Entertainment donated ₩30 million to the 4/16 Sewol Families for Truth and A Safer Society, an organization connected to the families of the sinking of MV Sewol.

== Artists ==
=== Groups ===
- BTS
- Tomorrow X Together
- Cortis

=== Soloists ===
- Lee Hyun (Midnatt)
- RM
- Agust D
- J-Hope
- Jin
- Jimin
- Jungkook
- V
- Yeonjun
- Beomgyu

=== Producers ===
- "Hitman" Bang
- Pdogg
- Slow Rabbit
- Supreme Boi
- Agust D
- Yeonjun
- Beomgyu
- Huening Kai
- Martin (CORTIS)

=== Choreographers ===
- Son Sung-deuk
- James (CORTIS)

== Former artists ==
- K.Will (2005–2007, co-managed by JYP Entertainment)
- 2AM (2008–2014, co-managed by JYP)
  - Jo Kwon (2010–2014)
- 8Eight (2007–2014, co-managed by Source Music)
- Glam (2010–2014, co-managed by Source Music)
- Lim Jeong-hee (2012–2015, co-managed by JYP)
- Homme (2010–2018)
  - Changmin (2010–2018)
