= Arirang World Tour =

2026–2027 concert tour by BTS

- World tour by BTS
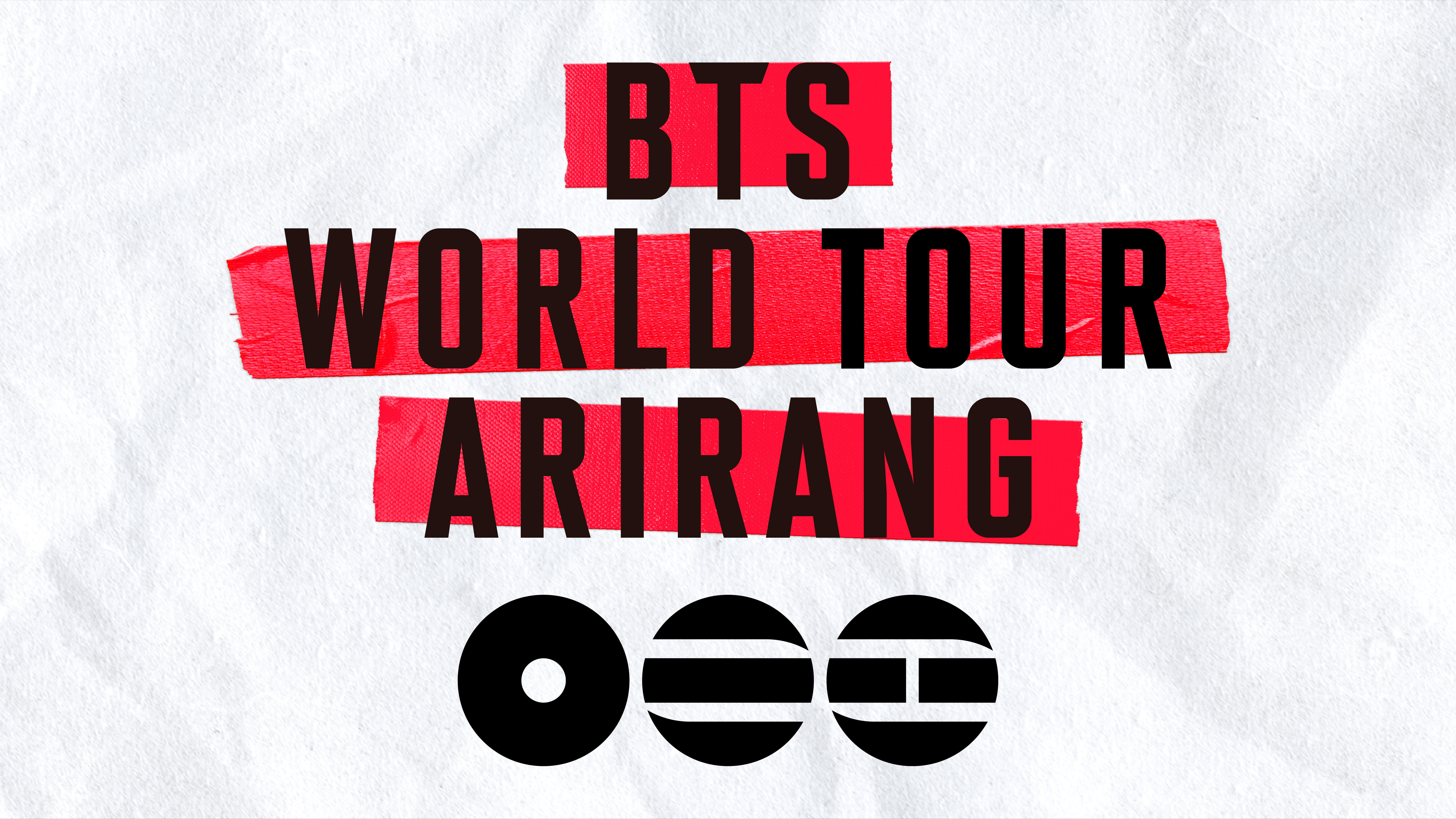
- Promotional poster
- Location: Asia; Europe; North America; Oceania; South America
- Associated album: Arirang
- Start date: April 9, 2026
- End date: March 16, 2027
- No. of shows: 88
- Website: btsworldtourofficial.com

BTS concert chronology
- Permission to Dance on Stage (2021‍–‍2022); Arirang World Tour (2026‍–‍2027)

The Arirang World Tour (stylized in all caps) is the ongoing sixth concert tour by the South Korean group BTS in support of their 2026 studio album, Arirang. The all-stadium tour began on April 9, 2026, in Goyang, and will continue through 2027. Marking BTS's return to live performances after completing their mandatory military service, it spans more than 88 dates in 34 cities across 23 countries.

== Background ==
In October 2025, Bloomberg News reported that BTS would hold "their largest world tour to date" the following year. On January 13, 2026, under the name BTS World Tour, a 79-date, 34-city schedule was announced, with additional shows to be added in Japan, the Middle East, and more countries in 2027. Two days later, it was revealed that the group would call their forthcoming album Arirang. The performances feature a 360-degree stage.

Tickets to their concerts in South Korea, North America, and Europe were sold out within a few hours of the pre-sale and general sale. Over 1.1 million people tried to buy tickets for the Mexican concerts; Mexico's president Claudia Sheinbaum appealed to South Korea's president Lee Jae Myung to add more shows in her country, after local concert promoter OCESA told her that the band's packed itinerary made adding shows unfeasible.

Several cities had an additional show announced after the initial ticket sales. On January 22, 2026, two additional shows were announced, one in Tampa and one in Stanford. The next day one show was also added in Las Vegas, bringing the tour total to 82 shows. On April 8, 2026, three concerts were added to the Latin American leg of the tour, bringing the tour total to 85 shows: one additional show was scheduled each in Lima, Santiago, and Buenos Aires. On June 2, 2026 one additional show was announced in Melbourne. On June 16, 2026, two shows were added to the schedule, one each in Jakarta and Bulacan, bringing the tour total to 88 shows.

== Critical reception ==
The tour has received critical acclaim. Writing for Consequence, Christine Terrisse pointed out "BTS are less focused on this tour on the intricate choreography they are known for in favor of a looser structure" and that "pop dominance on a massive scale somehow combines with intimate, deeply cultural elements in a way that often feels right.". The Hollywood Reporter praised the setlist, the stage design, the elaborate production, the performances, and the elements of Korean culture incorporated into the show, noting that "it's hard to believe one could see a show like this one — which included introductions and interludes of traditional Korean music, an elaborate homage to the Korean flag motif and 360-degree 'jeongja' style pavilion inspired by Gyeonghoeru Pavilion in Gyeongbokgung Palace — and deny that the group's cultural identity has been infused into every moment". Forbes' contributor Laura Sirikul called the opening shows in Goyang "a stunning spectacle" for "an impactful, powerful group". NME gave the concert 4.5 out of 5 stars, praising the energy and setlist along with the themes of connection and identity in the "spectacular" stadium show.

During the May 19, 2026, concert at Stanford Stadium, fans organized a project in which they simultaneously raised the flag of South Korea while singing "Arirang" during "Body to Body", which was deemed "one of the most memorable moments" by Lee Jung-joo of The Korea Herald.

== Commercial performance ==
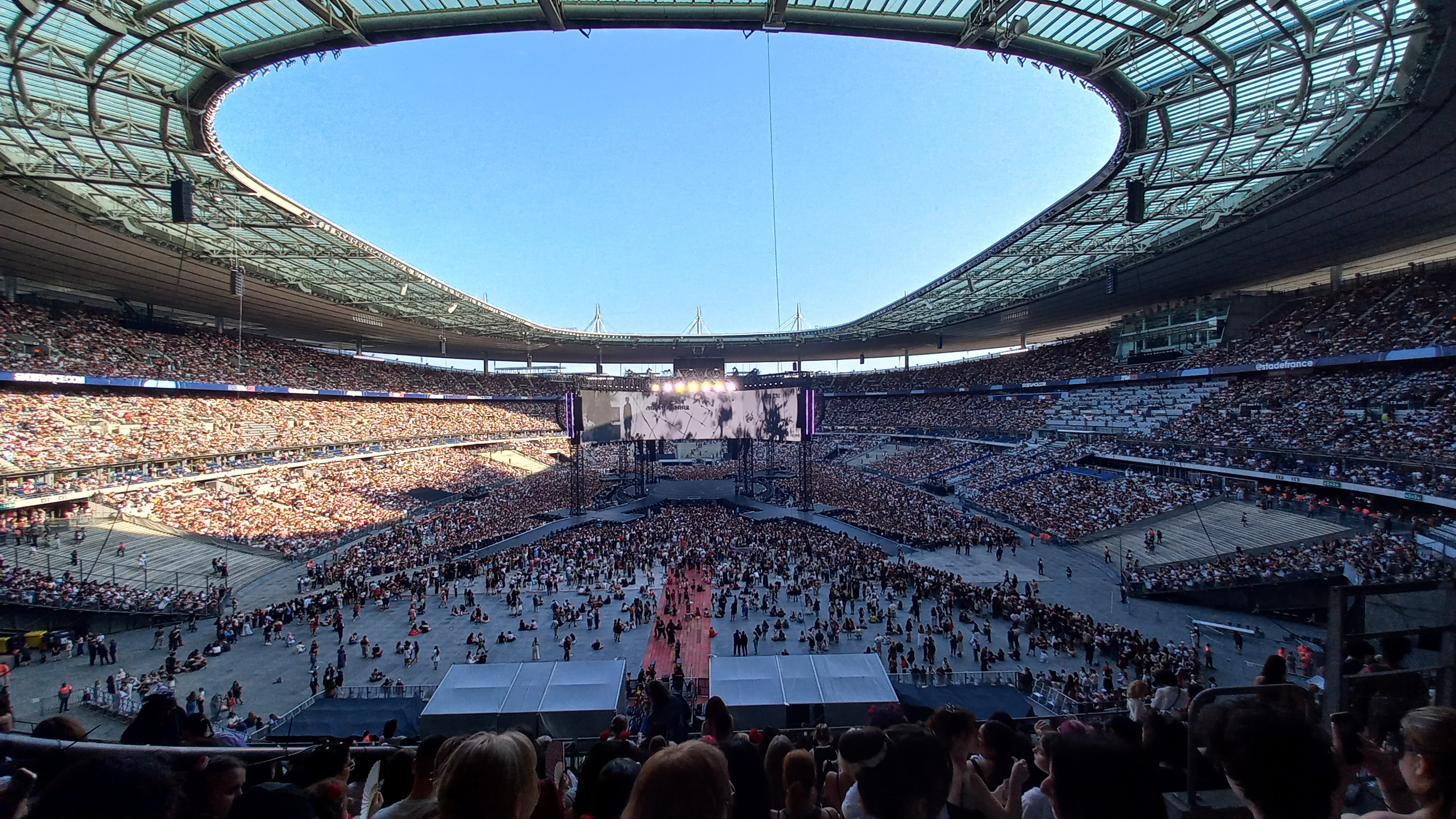
The stage at the Stade de France, 17 July 2026

With the two shows held at Stade de France in Saint-Denis, BTS achieved the most-attended shows of the tour and their career, earning US$15.3 million and selling 92,500 tickets per show.

BTS set multiple venue records during the tour. The three shows at Raymond James Stadium in Tampa grossed $40.7 million, the highest since its opening in 1998. With the four shows held at Allegiant Stadium in Paradise, they earned US$49.5 million from 246,000 tickets sold, the highest since the venue opened in 2020. The stop at Tottenham Hotspur Stadium in London broke the record for the highest attendance per concert since the opening of the stadium in April 2019 with 65,000 ticket sold per show. The group drew more than 141,000 fans to M&T Bank Stadium over two sold-out nights on August 15 and 16, 2026, setting a venue record with a gross revenue of $27.6 million. The two shows at Gillette Stadium in Foxborough grossed $28.6 million, making BTS the highest-grossing artist at the venue since its opening in 2002.

At MetLife Stadium in East Rutherford, the group achieved the third highest-grossing and most-attended shows in the venue history, earning US$31.8 million and selling 158,000 tickets over two shows. With the two shows held at Sun Bowl in El Paso, United States, the group drew approximately 97,700 attendees.

== Accolades ==
Awards and nominations for "Arirang World Tour"
Award show	Year	Category	Result	Ref.
Melon Music Awards	2026	Stage of The Year	Won	

== Set list ==
This set list was taken from the April 9, 2026, show in Goyang, South Korea. It may not represent all shows throughout the tour.

Act 1 – BTS (한)

1. "Hooligan"
2. "Aliens"
3. "달려라 방탄" (Run BTS)
4. "They Don't Know 'bout Us"
5. "Like Animals"
6. "Fake Love"
7. "Swim"
8. "Merry Go Round"

Act 2 – Korea (흥)

9. "2.0"
10. "Normal"
11. "Not Today"
12. "Mic Drop"
13. "Fya"
14. "불타오르네" (Fire)
15. "Body to Body"
16. "Idol"

Act 3 – Arirang (사랑)

17. "Come Over"
18. "Butter"
19. "Dynamite"
20. Surprise song 1
21. Surprise song 2
22. "Please"
23. "Into the Sun"

=== Alterations ===
- At the two Busan shows, "One More Night" replaced "Please", and the Korean version of "Normal" was performed. In addition, three surprise songs were played instead of two on June 13, 2026.
- At the third Santiago show on October 17, 2026, "2.0" was performed twice due to a stage malfunction.
- At all three São Paulo shows on October 28, 30 & 31, 2026, "Idol" was performed with a full-stage choreography instead of the fan walk routine.

=== Surprise songs ===
After "Dynamite", BTS plays two random tracks from their discography at each show.

First Asian Leg

- April 9 – Goyang: "소우주" (Mikrokosmos) and "I Need U"
- April 11 – Goyang: "Take Two" and "DNA"
- April 12 – Goyang: "봄날" (Spring Day) and "Run"
- April 17 – Tokyo: "Save Me" and "Crystal Snow"
- April 18 – Tokyo: "쩔어" (Dope) and "For You"

First North American Leg

- April 25 – Tampa: "Permission to Dance" and "Magic Shop"
- April 26 – Tampa: "작은 것들을 위한 시" (Boy with Luv) and "Pied Piper"
- April 28 – Tampa: "Life Goes On" and "뱁새" (Silver Spoon)
- May 2 – El Paso: "On" and "Outro: Wings"
- May 3 – El Paso: "Dionysus" and "Best of Me"
- May 7 – Mexico City: "상남자" (Boy in Luv) and "So What"
- May 9 – Mexico City: "We Are Bulletproof Pt.2" and "하루만" (Just One Day)
- May 10 – Mexico City: "Airplane Pt.2" and "봄날 "(Spring Day)"
- May 16 – Stanford: "N.O" and "Anpanman"
- May 17 – Stanford: "쩔어" (Dope) and "피 땀 눈물" (Blood Sweat & Tears)
- May 19 – Stanford: "I Need U" and "No More Dream"
- May 23 – Las Vegas: "Permission to Dance" and "고민보다 Go" (Go Go)
- May 24 – Las Vegas: "Black Swan" and "등골브레이커" (Spine Breaker)
- May 27 – Las Vegas: "Anpanman" and "진격의 방탄" (Attack on Bangtan)
- May 28 – Las Vegas: "흥탄소년단" (Boyz with Fun) and "Danger"

BTS Festa

- June 12 – Busan: "팔도강산" (Paldogangsan) and "Ma City"
- June 13 – Busan: "보조개" (Dimple), "땡" (Ddaeng), and "Magic Shop"

European Leg

- June 26 – Madrid: "Airplane Pt.2" and "Outro: Wings"
- June 27 – Madrid: "소우주" (Mikrokosmos) and "Best of Me"
- July 1 – Brussels: "Tomorrow" and "작은 것들을 위한 시" (Boy with Luv)
- July 2 – Brussels: "On" and "For Youth"
- July 6 – London: "Life Goes On" and "Dionysus"
- July 7 – London: "Save Me" and "Epilogue: Young Forever"
- July 11 – Munich: "뱁새" (Silver Spoon) and "Pied Piper"
- July 12 – Munich: "Louder than Bombs" and "피 땀 눈물" (Blood Sweat & Tears)
- July 17 – Paris: "작은 것들을 위한 시" (Boy with Luv) and "Jump"
- July 18 – Paris: "So What" and "We Are Bulletproof: The Eternal"

Second North American Leg

- August 1 – East Rutherford: "병" (Dis-ease) and "Run"
- August 2 – East Rutherford: "고엽" (Autumn Leaves) and "고민보다 Go" (Go Go)
- August 5 – Foxborough: "낙원" (Paradise) and "No More Dream"
- August 6 – Foxborough: "Make It Right" and "N.O"
- August 10 – Baltimore: "잠시" (Telepathy) and "상남자" (Boy in Luv)
- August 11 – Baltimore: "하루만" (Just One Day) and "Best of Me"
- August 15 – Arlington: "Permission to Dance" and "고민보다 Go" (Go Go)
- August 16 – Arlington: "Butterfly" and "DNA"
- August 22 – Toronto: "Outro: Wings" and "쩔어" (Dope)
- August 23 – Toronto: "00:00" (Zero O'Clock) and "Outro: Tear"
- August 27 – Chicago: "Tomorrow" and "힙합성애자" (Hip Hop Phile)
- August 28 – Chicago: "134340" and "소우주" (Mikrokosmos)
- September 1 – Inglewood: "상남자" (Boy in Luv) and "Magic Shop"
- September 2 – Inglewood: "Love Maze" and "뱁새" (Silver Spoon)
- September 5 – Inglewood: "Home" and "Pied Piper"
- September 6 – Inglewood: "Whalien 52" and "봄날 "(Spring Day)"

South American Leg

- October 2 – Bogotá: "I'm Fine" and "So What"
- October 3 – Bogotá: "We Are Bulletproof Pt.2" and "소우주" (Mikrokosmos)
- October 7 – Lima: "Home" and "Outro: Wings"
- October 9 – Lima: "팔도강산" (Paldogangsan) and "We Are Bulletproof: The Eternal"
- October 10 – Lima: "House of Cards" and "욱" (Ugh!)
- October 14 – Santiago: "Run" and "Save Me"
- October 16 – Santiago: "잠시" (Telepathy) and "Heartbeat"
- October 17 – Santiago: "Jump" and "등골브레이커" (Spine Breaker)
- October 21 – Buenos Aires: "잡아줘" (Hold Me Tight) and "Dionysus"
- October 23 – Buenos Aires: "진격의 방탄" (Attack on Bangtan) and "Epilogue: Young Forever"
- October 24 – Buenos Aires: "Lost" and "BTS Cypher 4"
- October 28 – São Paulo: "Black Swan" and "뱁새" (Silver Spoon)
- October 30 – São Paulo: "Airplane Pt. 2" and "I Need U"
- October 31 – São Paulo: "땡" (Ddaeng) and "BTS Cypher Pt.3: Killer"

Second Asian Leg

- November 19 – Kaohsiung: "DNA" and "Answer: Love Myself"
- November 21 – Kaohsiung: "바다" (Sea) and "상남자" (Boy in Luv)
- November 22 – Kaohsiung: "이불킥" (Embarrassed) and "작은 것들을 위한 시" (Boy With Luv)

== Tour dates ==
List of concert dates
Date	City	Country	Venue	Attendance	Revenue
April 9, 2026	Goyang	South Korea	Goyang Stadium	127,218 / 127,218	$16,886,193
April 11, 2026	Goyang	South Korea	Goyang Stadium	127,218 / 127,218	$16,886,193
April 12, 2026	Goyang	South Korea	Goyang Stadium	127,218 / 127,218	$16,886,193
April 17, 2026	Tokyo	Japan	Tokyo Dome	96,178 / 96,178	$18,556,720
April 18, 2026	Tokyo	Japan	Tokyo Dome	96,178 / 96,178	$18,556,720
April 25, 2026	Tampa	United States	Raymond James Stadium	194,335 / 194,335	$40,736,443
April 26, 2026	Tampa	United States	Raymond James Stadium	194,335 / 194,335	$40,736,443
April 28, 2026	Tampa	United States	Raymond James Stadium	194,335 / 194,335	$40,736,443
May 2, 2026	El Paso	United States	Sun Bowl	97,722 / 97,722	$20,018,656
May 3, 2026	El Paso	United States	Sun Bowl	97,722 / 97,722	$20,018,656
May 7, 2026	Mexico City	Mexico	Estadio GNP Seguros	145,763 / 145,875	$43,477,766
May 9, 2026	Mexico City	Mexico	Estadio GNP Seguros	145,763 / 145,875	$43,477,766
May 10, 2026	Mexico City	Mexico	Estadio GNP Seguros	145,763 / 145,875	$43,477,766
May 16, 2026	Stanford	United States	Stanford Stadium	151,693 / 151,693	$30,531,183
May 17, 2026	Stanford	United States	Stanford Stadium	151,693 / 151,693	$30,531,183
May 19, 2026	Stanford	United States	Stanford Stadium	151,693 / 151,693	$30,531,183
May 23, 2026	Paradise (Note: Labelled as Las Vegas in promotional material.)	United States	Allegiant Stadium	245,691 / 245,691	$66,552,088
May 24, 2026	Paradise	United States	Allegiant Stadium	245,691 / 245,691	$66,552,088
May 27, 2026	Paradise	United States	Allegiant Stadium	245,691 / 245,691	$66,552,088
May 28, 2026	Paradise	United States	Allegiant Stadium	245,691 / 245,691	$66,552,088
June 12, 2026	Busan	South Korea	Busan Asiad Main Stadium	106,827 / 106,827	$13,627,081
June 13, 2026	Busan	South Korea	Busan Asiad Main Stadium	106,827 / 106,827	$13,627,081
June 26, 2026	Madrid	Spain	Riyadh Air Metropolitano	134,839 / 134,839	$26,071,966
June 27, 2026	Madrid	Spain	Riyadh Air Metropolitano	134,839 / 134,839	$26,071,966
July 1, 2026	Brussels	Belgium	King Baudouin Stadium	126,194 / 126,194	$23,576,759
July 2, 2026	Brussels	Belgium	King Baudouin Stadium	126,194 / 126,194	$23,576,759
July 6, 2026	London	England	Tottenham Hotspur Stadium	130,133 / 130,133	$24,613,519
July 7, 2026	London	England	Tottenham Hotspur Stadium	130,133 / 130,133	$24,613,519
July 11, 2026	Munich	Germany	Allianz Arena	141,016 / 141,016	$23,596,475
July 12, 2026	Munich	Germany	Allianz Arena	141,016 / 141,016	$23,596,475
July 17, 2026	Saint-Denis (Note: Labelled as Paris in promotional material.)	France	Stade de France	184,502 / 184,502	$30,570,056
July 18, 2026	Saint-Denis	France	Stade de France	184,502 / 184,502	$30,570,056
August 1, 2026	East Rutherford (Note: Labelled as New York in promotional material.)	United States	MetLife Stadium	157,798 / 157,798	$31,755,953
August 2, 2026	East Rutherford	United States	MetLife Stadium	157,798 / 157,798	$31,755,953
August 5, 2026	Foxborough	United States	Gillette Stadium	132,943 / 132,943	$28,650,109
August 6, 2026	Foxborough	United States	Gillette Stadium	132,943 / 132,943	$28,650,109
August 10, 2026	Baltimore	United States	M&T Bank Stadium	141,288 / 141,288	$27,593,459
August 11, 2026	Baltimore	United States	M&T Bank Stadium	141,288 / 141,288	$27,593,459
August 15, 2026	Arlington	United States	AT&T Stadium	136,000 / 136,000	$29,600,000
August 16, 2026	Arlington	United States	AT&T Stadium	136,000 / 136,000	$29,600,000
August 22, 2026	Toronto	Canada	Rogers Stadium	107,000 / 107,000	$24,100,000
August 23, 2026	Toronto	Canada	Rogers Stadium	107,000 / 107,000	$24,100,000
August 27, 2026	Chicago	United States	Soldier Field	126,000 / 126,000	$27,200,000
August 28, 2026	Chicago	United States	Soldier Field	126,000 / 126,000	$27,200,000
September 1, 2026	Inglewood (Note: Labelled as Los Angeles in promotional material.)	United States	SoFi Stadium	282,000 / 282,000	$57,700,000
September 2, 2026	Inglewood	United States	SoFi Stadium	282,000 / 282,000	$57,700,000
September 5, 2026	Inglewood	United States	SoFi Stadium	282,000 / 282,000	$57,700,000
September 6, 2026	Inglewood	United States	SoFi Stadium	282,000 / 282,000	$57,700,000
October 2, 2026	Bogotá	Colombia	Estadio El Campín	101,000 / 101,000	$23,293,000
October 3, 2026	Bogotá	Colombia	Estadio El Campín	101,000 / 101,000	$23,293,000
October 7, 2026	Lima	Peru	Estadio San Marcos	151,000 / 151,000	$32,043,000
October 9, 2026	Lima	Peru	Estadio San Marcos	151,000 / 151,000	$32,043,000
October 10, 2026	Lima	Peru	Estadio San Marcos	151,000 / 151,000	$32,043,000
October 14, 2026	Santiago	Chile	Estadio Nacional Julio Martínez Prádanos	193,000 / 193,000	$35,424,000
October 16, 2026	Santiago	Chile	Estadio Nacional Julio Martínez Prádanos	193,000 / 193,000	$35,424,000
October 17, 2026	Santiago	Chile	Estadio Nacional Julio Martínez Prádanos	193,000 / 193,000	$35,424,000
October 21, 2026	La Plata (Note: Labelled as Buenos Aires in promotional material.)	Argentina	Estadio Único Diego Armando Maradona	150,000 / 150,000	$36,457,301
October 23, 2026	La Plata	Argentina	Estadio Único Diego Armando Maradona	150,000 / 150,000	$36,457,301
October 24, 2026	La Plata	Argentina	Estadio Único Diego Armando Maradona	150,000 / 150,000	$36,457,301
October 28, 2026	São Paulo	Brazil	Estádio MorumBIS	257,000 / 257,000	$42,242,000
October 30, 2026	São Paulo	Brazil	Estádio MorumBIS	257,000 / 257,000	$42,242,000
October 31, 2026	São Paulo	Brazil	Estádio MorumBIS	257,000 / 257,000	$42,242,000
November 19, 2026	Kaohsiung	Taiwan	Kaohsiung National Stadium	—	—
November 21, 2026	Kaohsiung	Taiwan	Kaohsiung National Stadium	—	—
November 22, 2026	Kaohsiung	Taiwan	Kaohsiung National Stadium	—	—
December 3, 2026	Bangkok	Thailand	Rajamangala National Stadium	—	—
December 5, 2026	Bangkok	Thailand	Rajamangala National Stadium	—	—
December 6, 2026	Bangkok	Thailand	Rajamangala National Stadium	—	—
December 12, 2026	Kuala Lumpur	Malaysia	TM National Stadium	—	—
December 13, 2026	Kuala Lumpur	Malaysia	TM National Stadium	—	—
December 17, 2026	Singapore		Singapore National Stadium	—	—
December 19, 2026	Singapore		Singapore National Stadium	—	—
December 20, 2026	Singapore		Singapore National Stadium	—	—
December 22, 2026	Singapore		Singapore National Stadium	—	—
December 26, 2026	Jakarta	Indonesia	Gelora Bung Karno Stadium	—	—
December 27, 2026	Jakarta	Indonesia	Gelora Bung Karno Stadium	—	—
December 29, 2026	Jakarta	Indonesia	Gelora Bung Karno Stadium	—	—
February 10, 2027	Melbourne	Australia	Marvel Stadium	—	—
February 12, 2027	Melbourne	Australia	Marvel Stadium	—	—
February 13, 2027	Melbourne	Australia	Marvel Stadium	—	—
February 20, 2027	Sydney	Australia	Accor Stadium	—	—
February 21, 2027	Sydney	Australia	Accor Stadium	—	—
March 4, 2027	Hong Kong		Kai Tak Stadium	—	—
March 6, 2027	Hong Kong		Kai Tak Stadium	—	—
March 7, 2027	Hong Kong		Kai Tak Stadium	—	—
March 13, 2027	Bocaue (Note: Labelled as Bulacan in promotional material.)	Philippines	Philippine Sports Stadium	—	—
March 14, 2027	Bocaue	Philippines	Philippine Sports Stadium	—	—
March 16, 2027	Bocaue	Philippines	Philippine Sports Stadium	—	—

== See also ==
- List of Billboard Boxscore number-one concert series of the 2020s
- List of highest-grossing concert series at a single venue
- List of highest-grossing concert tours

== Notes ==
Cities
