= Hooligan (song) =

Single by BTS

from the album Arirang
- Language: English; Korean
- Released: April 7, 2026
- Genre: Hip-hop; alternative hip-hop
- Length: 3:02
- Label: BigHit
- Songwriters: Pablo Diaz Reixa; Michel Magne; Pablo Martinez Alborch; Marcus Lomax; Alexander Izquierdo; Jeon Jung-kook; Brittany Amaradio; Jasper Harris; Kim Nam-joon; Jung Ho-seok; Min Yoon-gi; Derrick Milano; Kang Hyo-won; Kirsten Spencer
- Producers: El Guincho; Fakeguido; Harris; Ghstloop

BTS singles chronology
"Swim" (2026)	"Hooligan" (2026)	"Normal" (2026)

Music video
- "Hooligan" on YouTube

"Hooligan" is a song by South Korean boy band BTS and from their tenth studio album, Arirang (2026). It was produced by El Guincho, Fakeguido, Jasper Harris and Ghstloop and contains a sample of "Yang Tse-Kiang", written and performed by Michel Magne. BigHit Music released the song as the second single from Arirang on April 7, 2026.

== Composition ==
"Hooligan" has been described as alternative hip-hop. The production blends strings arrangement from "Yang Tse-Kiang", written and performed by Michel Magne, with a percussion rhythm resembling the sound of sharpening blades. In both Korean and English, the BTS singers each perform the sung-through part in the chorus in falsetto, while the rappers perform the verses in an aggressive, braggadocious style. Lyrically, they reflect on their journey to success and assert their global dominance.

== Critical reception ==
The song received generally positive reviews. Nicole Fell of The Hollywood Reporter considered it one of the most interesting tracks on Arirang. Consequence's Wren Graves called it "glitchy and infectious". Michael Cragg of The Guardian described BTS as "adept" at "riding Hooligan's metallic experimentation". Mark Savage of BBC regarded the song as "equally audacious" as their song "Fya". Writing for The New York Times, Jon Caramanica commented that the song evokes the style of music from 1940s films, calling it "a thrilling tug of war". Rhian Daly of NME stated that the song "dials up the fun and takes things into satisfyingly strange sonic territory". Pitchfork's Joshua Minsoo Kim remarked that "The beat's contrasting elements befit the whiplash in vocal deliveries: RM gives off a cartoonish villain laugh while V and Jimin deliver soaring vocals." Vulture's Craig Jenkins criticized the song, writing that the BTS members "spend too much time admiring the beat".

== Awards and nominations ==
List of awards and nominations
Award ceremony	Year	Category	Result	Ref.
Berlin Commercial Awards	2026	Craft: Editing	Shortlisted	
Berlin Commercial Awards	2026	Craft: Costume Styling	Shortlisted	
The Fact Music Awards	2026	Best Music – Summer	Won	

== Charts ==
=== Weekly charts ===
Weekly chart performance
Chart (2026)	Peak position
Argentina Hot 100 (Billboard)	41
Australia (ARIA)	46
Bolivia (Billboard)	4
Brazil Hot 100 (Billboard)	5
Canada Hot 100 (Billboard)	32
Central America Anglo Airplay (Monitor Latino)	12
Chile (Billboard)	7
China (TME Korean)	8
Colombia Hot 100 (Billboard)	32
Costa Rica Anglo Airplay (Monitor Latino)	9
Czech Republic Singles Digital (ČNS IFPI)	81
Dominican Republic Anglo Airplay (Monitor Latino)	14
Ecuador (Billboard)	12
Ecuador Streaming (Promúsica)	15
France (SNEP)	88
Germany (GfK)	48
Global 200 (Billboard)	3
Greece International (IFPI)	13
Hong Kong (Billboard)	7
India International (IMI)	4
Japan Combined Singles (Oricon)	41
Japan Hot 100 (Billboard)	26
Latvia Streaming (LaIPA)	12
Malaysia (IFPI)	16
Malaysia International (RIM)	4
Mexico (Billboard)	17
Middle East and North Africa (IFPI)	17
New Zealand (Recorded Music NZ)	37
Panama Anglo Airplay (Monitor Latino)	11
Panama Streaming (PRODUCE)	12
Peru Anglo Airplay (Monitor Latino)	16
Peru Streaming (Promúsica)	4
Philippines Hot 100 (Billboard Philippines)	13
Poland Streaming (OLiS)	60
Portugal (AFP)	15
Romania (Billboard)	22
Russia Streaming (TopHit)	69
Singapore (RIAS)	3
Slovakia Singles Digital (ČNS IFPI)	62
South Africa Streaming (TOSAC)	94
South Korea (Circle)	16
South Korea Hot 100 (Billboard)	8
Spain (Promusicae)	67
Taiwan (Billboard)	4
United Arab Emirates (IFPI)	12
US Billboard Hot 100	35
Vietnam (IFPI)	8

=== Monthly charts ===
Monthly chart performance
Chart (2026)	Peak position
Brazil Streaming (Pro-Música Brasil)	24
Panama Streaming (PRODUCE)	40
Russia Streaming (TopHit)	77
South Korea (Circle)	42

== Release history ==
Release history and formats for "Normal"
Region	Date	Format(s)	Label	Ref.
Various	April 7, 2026	Digital download; streaming	BigHit	
