= Permission to Dance on Stage =

2021 concert tour by BTS

- Tour by BTS
- Seoul promotional poster
- Location: Asia; North America
- Start date: October 24, 2021
- End date: April 16, 2022
- Legs: 2
- No. of shows: 12
- Attendance: 459,000 (in-person); 4,000,000 (total)

BTS concert chronology
- Map of the Soul ON:E (2020); Permission to Dance on Stage (2021–2022); Arirang World Tour (2026–2027)

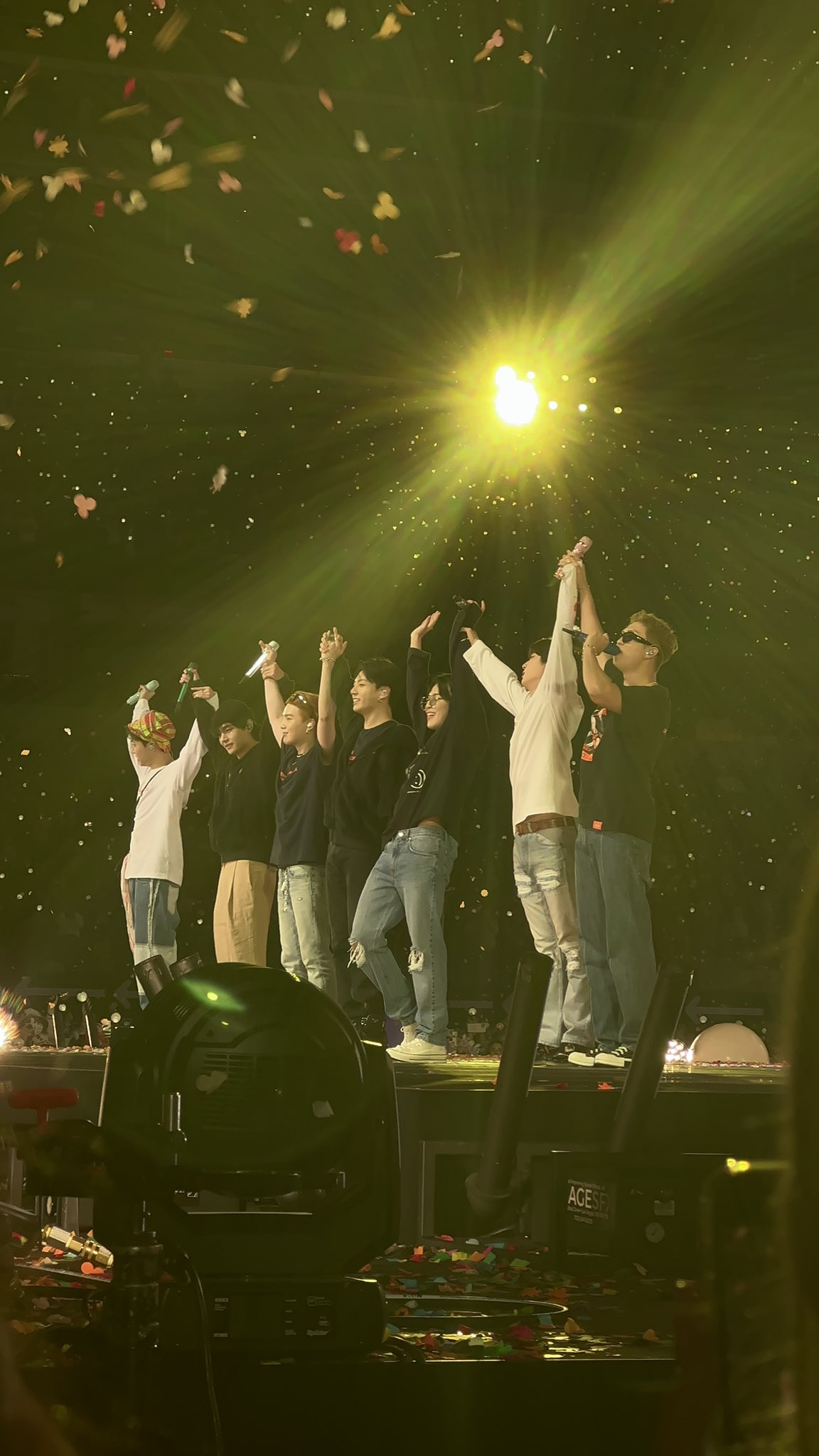
BTS during day 2 of Permission to Dance on Stage—LA at SoFi Stadium on November 28, 2021

Permission to Dance on Stage was a series of concert performances headlined by South Korean band BTS. Due to COVID-19 restrictions on gatherings and travel, the series included stadium performances with and without live audiences in attendance in lieu of a traditional concert tour; the setlist contained numerous songs from the band's past discographies. The 12-show run began in Seoul, South Korea on October 24, 2021, and concluded in Las Vegas, Nevada on April 16, 2022.

== Background ==
In January 2020, BTS announced their 4-leg, 39-show Map of the Soul Tour, but that was eventually cancelled in August 2021 due to uncertainty stemming from the COVID-19 pandemic. The band organized Map of the Soul ON:E, which initially included an offline fan presence and pay-per-view streaming, but in-person tickets were also cancelled ahead of the October 2020 performance. As the top-grossing touring group of 2019, the band expressed frustration and sadness about their inability to hold live concerts with their supporters present. By 2021, the severity of the pandemic and subsequent restrictions varied greatly from country to country, and city to city, which pushed the act and their company to look into hybridizing their performances in formats that would allow them to dynamically engage fans in person and online.

On September 15, 2021, BTS announced an online concert carded for October 24 at the Seoul Olympic Stadium. Despite the venue's 80,000 person capacity, the show was held as a pay-per-view, streaming only event due to domestic live event restrictions. Later that month, the band also announced four overseas concerts to be held in the United States at the newly built SoFi Stadium in Inglewood, California on November 27 and 28, and December 1 and 2, with the final show revealing on screen, "See you in Seoul, March 2022." The announcement was also made on BTS' official Twitter account shortly after the show ended.

On February 22, 2022, BTS then announced an expanded leg of the tour, with four shows taking place at Allegiant Stadium in Las Vegas, Nevada on April 8 and 9, and April 15 and 16.

The shows marked the band's first live performance before an in-person audience since their Love Yourself: Speak Yourself stadium tour in 2019, and tickets for all in-person shows were sold out within a few hours of release. Permission to Dance On Stage garnered more than an estimated 4 million attendees in-person and online combined.

== Production ==
On October 24, 2021, the group performed at the Seoul Olympic Stadium, the location of their last stadium concert held in 2019. Due to a calf injury sustained during rehearsals the day before, member V did not participate in any choreography, but performed while seated on stage. To enhance the virtual experience, Big Hit added features that allowed the online audience to view the show from six different real-time angles and used an overlay for additional effects and text. The online concert was streamed in 197 countries.

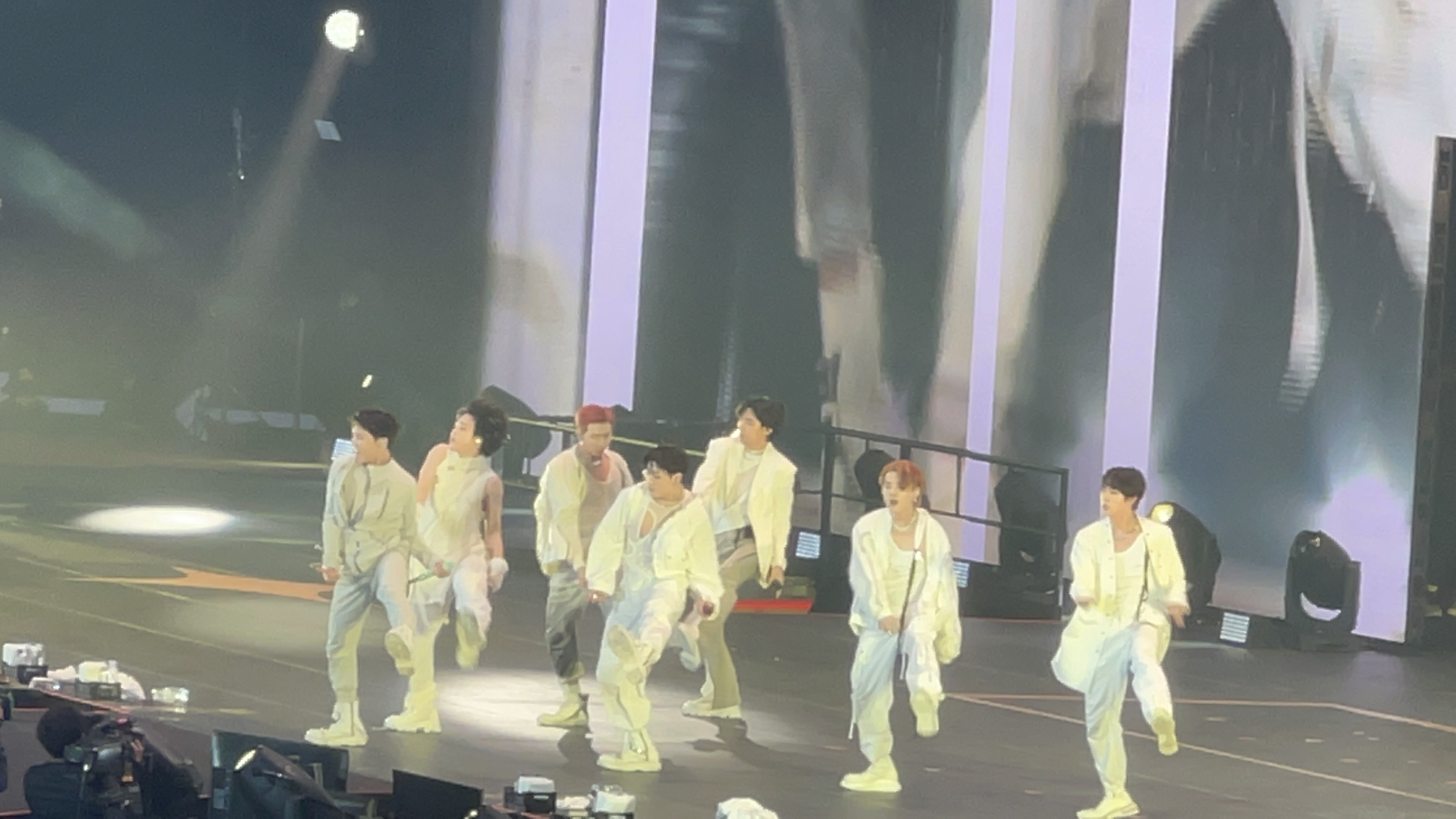
BTS during day 2 of Permission to Dance on Stage—LA at SoFi Stadium on November 28, 2021

In 2022, BTS held their first domestic live shows since 2019 before a limited in-person audience, once again at the Olympic Stadium. They performed on March 10, 12, and 13. Previous pandemic restrictions placed specifically on pop concert performances only allowed for up to 4,000 attendees. The BTS concerts were approved for 15,000 attendees per day, marking the largest music gatherings permitted by the South Korean government since Covid-19 protocols first went into effect. Cheering, screaming, and singing-along was prohibited during the shows and 750 safety personnel were present onsite to ensure all restrictions were adhered to. The shows on the 10th and 13th were additionally streamed online through Weverse. A global live-viewing event was held for the concert on the 12th. It was broadcast to over 3,000 theatres worldwide.

The band’s Las Vegas concerts on April 8 and 9, and April 15 and 16, 2022 at Allegiant Stadium involved a large-scale departure from previous concerts in the series by the band. MGM Resorts International and surrounding local establishments, in conjunction with Hybe, provided official BTS-themed, immersive fan events—coined an "urban concert playpark" by Billboard's Melinda Sheckells—for concert attendees in the city. The city-wide playpark included BTS Pop-Up experiences at Area15, BTS water shows at the Fountains of Bellagio, official concert afterparties at Aria Resort and Casino, a "Café in the City" at Mandalay Bay, and limited concert-themed merchandise for select attendees who booked BTS-themed rooms at 11 participating MGM Resorts hotels under a special discounted "BTS Rate".

Prior to the Las Vegas concerts, Big Hit released a statement regarding member Jin's finger injury and subsequent surgery on March 19, 2022. Having limited his physical activity during the post-surgery healing period, Jin was able to participate in minimal choreography for each of the shows—he remained seated for the more physically vigorous performances.

== Concert synopsis ==
Permission to Dance concert lasts around two and a half hours long. The show opened with BTS emerging from a cage and performed a live marching band of "On", followed by "Fire", "Dope", and "DNA". It then continued with slower songs like "Blue and Grey", and "Black Swan", which featured a choreographed sequence with the dancers dressed in a white-feathered sleeve costume. The group also performed a medley of "Blood Sweat & Tears" and "Fake Love" on a set that was inspired by their music videos and has elements such as the waterfalls and the giant sculpted hands. BTS then performed "Life Goes On" on a giant bed before moving to an oversized sofa, followed by live-band renditions of "Boy with Luv", "Dynamite", and "Butter". Afterwards, they performed B-sides such as "Airplane pt. 2", "Silver Spoon", "Telepathy”, “Dis-ease”, “Stay", and "So What". It was followed by "I Need U", "Save Me", and "I'm Fine". For the encore, they performed “Epilogue: Young Forever”, “Spring Day", and "Permission to Dance.

== Commercial performance ==
=== Seoul ===
For the 2022 concerts in Seoul, the show earned $32.6 million and set a new all-time record for live-event cinema, surpassing the previous record held by the band's Burn the Stage: The Movie (2019) of $18.5 million. In the United States alone, it earned $6.9 million from 800 theatres to become the top-grossing live cinema event ever in that territory. It surpassed The Batman in 55 cinemas as the top-grossing event of the weekend and ranked at number two everywhere else. In the UK, it ranked at number three, behind The Batman and Uncharted, having earned £899,127.

=== Los Angeles ===
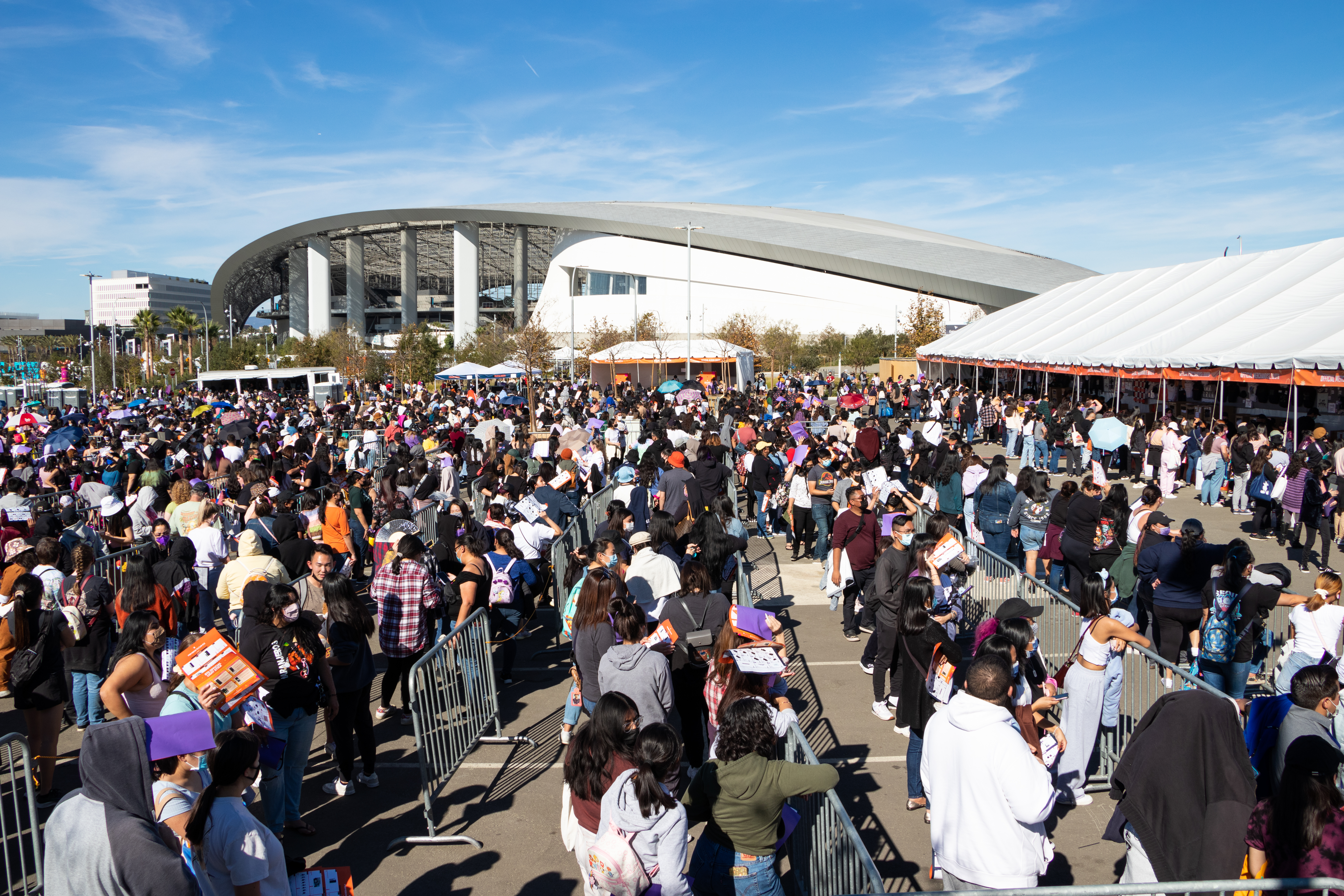
Queueing at the SoFi Stadium parking lot for tour merchandise

According to Billboard, Permission to Dance on Stage—LA recorded the biggest box office score total by any act in nearly a decade, grossing $33.3 million from 214,000 tickets sold, and made BTS' four SoFi Stadium shows the highest-grossing engagement of 2021 since venues reopened. It is the largest-grossing run of shows at a single venue since 2012 when Pink Floyd's Roger Waters earned $38 million from over nine shows at Estadio River Plate in Buenos Aires, Argentina; the biggest US-based boxscore in 18 years; the biggest ever boxscore in California; the second-biggest in the history of Billboard Boxscore in North America behind only Bruce Springsteen's $38.7 million-earning 10 shows at Giants Stadium in New Jersey; and the sixth best-grossing engagement in Billboard Boxscore history. Additionally, the shows marked the first time a non-English-language act (Note: BTS performed primarily in Korean for the shows) surpassed $20 and $30 million in one engagement—previously, Mexican singer Luis Miguel held the record with $19.3 million earned from 30 shows at Auditorio Nacional in Mexico City in 2006. BTS became the seventh act in history to earn over $30 million in a single engagement, alongside Waters, Springsteen, U2, the Grateful Dead, Take That, and the Spice Girls.

=== Las Vegas ===
The Las Vegas concerts attracted over 620,000 attendees, counting both in-person and online audiences. BTS are the only musical act to play four shows, to 200,000 concert-goers, at Allegiant since it first opened in 2020. An additional 22,000 spectators gathered at MGM Grand Garden Arena to watch corresponding livestream performances of the shows. With a collective $35.9 million earned, the shows claimed Billboard's all-time box office record for Las Vegas and the state of Nevada; the second biggest North American boxscore only behind Bruce Springsteen's $38.7 million at Giants Stadium in 2003; the fifth biggest boxscore of all time; and became the tenth boxscore to earn more than $30 million. BTS is the only non-US or UK-based artist to gross as much at a single venue, and the third act in history—after Take That and U2—to gross over $30 million twice.

== Critical reception ==
The concerts received positive reviews from critics. Kevin E G Perry from The Independent gave the concert a five-star review, calling it "a thrilling two-and-a-half hour show." For NME, Abby Webster also gave the concert five stars, and praised the setlist as a "unique blend of alchemy". Eryn Murphy from Showbiz Cheat Sheet wrote that the setlist "honored BTS’ history" and called the concerts "a jumping-off point for a new beginning." Consequence reviewer Mary Siroky described the LA concerts as "four days of pure joy" that "felt like a mini music festival," writing that it was "a moment of reunion between BTS and their beloved ARMY" and "an experience that has to be seen to be believed." The publication included it on their list of the 12 best live shows of 2021. For The Atlantic, Lenika Cruz described the concerts as "a kind of vindication of BTS—of their talent, authenticity, reach, and emotional connection with fans. All of those things had been called into question by critics, or at times by the artists themselves, in 2021. The four nights were loud, ecstatic, and poignant proof that they had all been wrong." In a positive review for Consequence, C. Moon Reed wrote that "the singing, the dancing, the earnest audience banter" at Permission to Dance on Stage — Las Vegas "was superb."

== Spin-off media ==
On September 8, 2022, as part of its second annual Disney+ Day event, Disney+ premiered the concert film BTS: Permission to Dance on Stage – LA, directed by Sam Wrench and Junsoo Park, on its streaming services worldwide as a surprise release. It was produced from the footage recorded at the shows in SoFi Stadium.

On November 15, 2023, Big Hit announced the VOD for the shows in United States, titled Permission to Dance on Stage in the US, and its release date as November 27. The Weverse digital code contains 511 minutes of footage, featuring the group's practice and rehearsal sessions for the US shows, alongside the concert films from the first show in Inglewood and the final show in Paradise. The package also includes 2 photobooks, 132 pages each, capturing memorable moments of the group in this leg.

On June 30, 2025, Big Hit Music announced the live album Permission to Dance on Stage – Live based on this tour that spanned across 2021 and 2022 over multiple venues to be released on July 18. Additionally, a VOD of the final shows at Jamsil Sports Complex, titled Permission to Dance on Stage - Seoul, was released as part of a digital code package. The package has a 141-minute digital code to redeem on Weverse, and a 92-page interview photo book that captures BTS members' on-stage and behind-the-scenes moments.

== Accolades ==
Accolades
Award/Organization	Year	Category	Result	Ref.
People's Choice Awards	2022	The Concert Tour of the Year	Won	
Pollstar Awards	2022	Pop Tour of the Year	Nominated	

== Set lists ==
This is the set list of the October 24, 2021 online concert. It does not represent all shows in the concert series.

1. "On"
2. "Fire"
3. "Dope"
4. "DNA"
5. "Blue & Grey"
6. "Black Swan"
7. "Blood Sweat & Tears"
8. "Fake Love"
9. "Life Goes On"
10. "Boy with Luv"
11. "Dynamite"
12. "Butter"
13. "Airplane Pt. 2"
14. "Silver Spoon"
15. "Dis-ease"
16. "Telepathy"
17. "Stay"
18. "So What"
19. "I Need U"
20. "Save Me"
21. "I'm Fine"
22. "Idol"

Encore

22. "Epilogue: Young Forever"
23. "Spring Day"
24. "Permission to Dance"

Notes

- On November 27, 2021, the encore featured "We Are Bulletproof: The Eternal" and "Answer: Love Myself", replacing "Epilogue: Young Forever" and "Spring Day".
- On November 28, 2021, the remix version of "Butter" was performed with special guest Megan Thee Stallion and "I'm Fine" was performed in place of "I Need U".
- On December 1, 2021, the encore featured "Answer: Love Myself", replacing "Epilogue: Young Forever".
- On December 2, 2021, "Home" and "Mikrokosmos" replaced "Young Forever" and "Spring Day", while "My Universe" was performed with special guest Chris Martin of Coldplay after "Permission to Dance".
- For the 2022 shows, the encore featured "Home" at the opening and "Permission to Dance" at the end, with one of the three song sets in between:
  - "Airplane Pt.2", "Silver Spoon" and "Dis-ease"
  - "Anpanman" and "Go Go"
  - "Spring Day" and "We Are Bulletproof: The Eternal".

== Tour dates ==
List of show dates, city, country, venue, attendance, and gross revenue
Date	City	Country	Venue	Attendance	Revenue	Ref.
October 24, 2021	Seoul (Note: Titled "BTS Permission to Dance on Stage")	South Korea	Seoul Olympic Stadium / Weverse	—N/a	—N/a	
November 27, 2021	Inglewood (Note: Titled "BTS Permission to Dance on Stage—LA" / "Live Play in LA")	United States	SoFi Stadium / YouTube Theater / Weverse (Note: December 2 show only)	813,000 (213,751 / 18,000 / 581,000)	$33,316,345	
November 28, 2021	Inglewood	United States	SoFi Stadium / YouTube Theater / Weverse	813,000 (213,751 / 18,000 / 581,000)	$33,316,345	
December 1, 2021	Inglewood	United States	SoFi Stadium / YouTube Theater / Weverse	813,000 (213,751 / 18,000 / 581,000)	$33,316,345	
December 2, 2021 (Note: Streamed online via Weverse/Venewlive)	Inglewood	United States	SoFi Stadium / YouTube Theater / Weverse	813,000 (213,751 / 18,000 / 581,000)	$33,316,345	
March 10, 2022	Seoul (Note: Titled "Permission to Dance on Stage—Seoul")	South Korea	Seoul Olympic Stadium / Select global theatres (Note: March 12 show only) / Weverse (Note: March 10 and 13 shows only)	2,465,000 (45,000 / 1,400,000 / 1,020,000)	TBA / $32,600,000 / TBA	
March 12, 2022	Seoul	South Korea	Seoul Olympic Stadium / Select global theatres / Weverse	2,465,000 (45,000 / 1,400,000 / 1,020,000)	TBA / $32,600,000 / TBA	
March 13, 2022	Seoul	South Korea	Seoul Olympic Stadium / Select global theatres / Weverse	2,465,000 (45,000 / 1,400,000 / 1,020,000)	TBA / $32,600,000 / TBA	
April 8, 2022	Paradise (Note: Titled "Permission to Dance on Stage—Las Vegas" / "Live Play in Las Vegas")	United States	Allegiant Stadium / MGM Grand Garden Arena (Note: Live viewing for all four dates) / Weverse (Note: April 16 show only)	624,000 (199,697 / 22,000 / 402,000)	$35,944,850	
April 9, 2022	Paradise	United States	Allegiant Stadium / MGM Grand Garden Arena / Weverse	624,000 (199,697 / 22,000 / 402,000)	$35,944,850	
April 15, 2022	Paradise	United States	Allegiant Stadium / MGM Grand Garden Arena / Weverse	624,000 (199,697 / 22,000 / 402,000)	$35,944,850	
April 16, 2022	Paradise	United States	Allegiant Stadium / MGM Grand Garden Arena / Weverse	624,000 (199,697 / 22,000 / 402,000)	$35,944,850	

== See also ==
- List of Billboard Boxscore number-one concert series of the 2020s
- List of highest-grossing concert series at a single venue
