= Swim (BTS song) =

2026 single by BTS

- Keep Swimming cover

Single by BTS

from the album Arirang
- B-side: "Normal"
- Released: March 20, 2026
- Genre: Alternative pop; synth-pop
- Length: 2:39
- Label: BigHit
- Songwriters: James Essien; Sean Foreman; Tyler Spry; Jamison Baken; Ryan Tedder; RM; Kirsten Spencer; Derrick Milano; Pdogg
- Producers: Leclair; Spry

BTS singles chronology
"Take Two" (2023)	"Swim" (2026)	"Hooligan" (2026)

Music video
- "Swim" on YouTube

"Swim" (stylized in all caps) is a song by South Korean boy group BTS. BigHit Music released it on March 20, 2026, as the lead single of the group's sixth Korean-language studio album, Arirang. It is produced by Tyler Spry and Leclair, and written by James Essien, Sean Foreman, Tyler Spry, Jamison Baken, Ryan Tedder, RM, Kirsten Allyssa Spencer, Derrick Milano, and Pdogg.

== Background and release ==
On January 4, 2026, BigHit Music announced BTS's comeback after a four-year hiatus during which they completed their mandatory military service and released solo work. The title of the album, Arirang, was revealed on January 15, referencing the Korean folk song of the same name. On March 3, BTS revealed the album's track listing and production credits, with the seventh track "Swim" highlighted in black, indicating the song is the lead single from the album. Before the release of the album, Hybe's official YouTube channel released two teasers for the song and its music video.

"Swim" was released as the lead single from Arirang on March 20, 2026. On March 23, BTS released the instrumental version. On March 27, the remix album for "Swim", titled Keep Swimming, was released. The nine-track album includes the original and instrumental versions of "Swim", as well as seven remixes reflecting each member's musical taste. In the United States, "Swim" was also sold by Target as a four-inch "tiny vinyl" with the song "Normal" on the b-side.

== Composition and lyrics ==
"Swim" has been described as alternative pop and synth-pop. The song is in 4/4 common time in the key of C-sharp major with a tempo of 92 to 96 beats per minute. BTS' vocal range span from C♯_{3} to E_{4}. The lyrics are entirely in English. BTS member RM, who is the main songwriter of "Swim", said: "I wrote the lyrics and I tried to express the confusion that we all had before [and] after the military... and we want to just keep swimming." RM said the track has a "clean and smooth allure", and has compared it to Pyongyang naengmyeon.

In a statement, BTS wrote:

"[It's] a song that mirrors life itself. [We] hope it resonates with many people as they move through each day, taking each moment as it comes, splashing along and continuing to swim forward. The more you listen, the warmer it feels, so [we] hope it becomes a source of strength as people go through their lives. Also, just like the folk song 'Arirang,' which has been passed from mouth to mouth and stayed with people through generations, [we] hope 'Swim' will remain close to people's hearts for a long time to come."

== Promotion ==
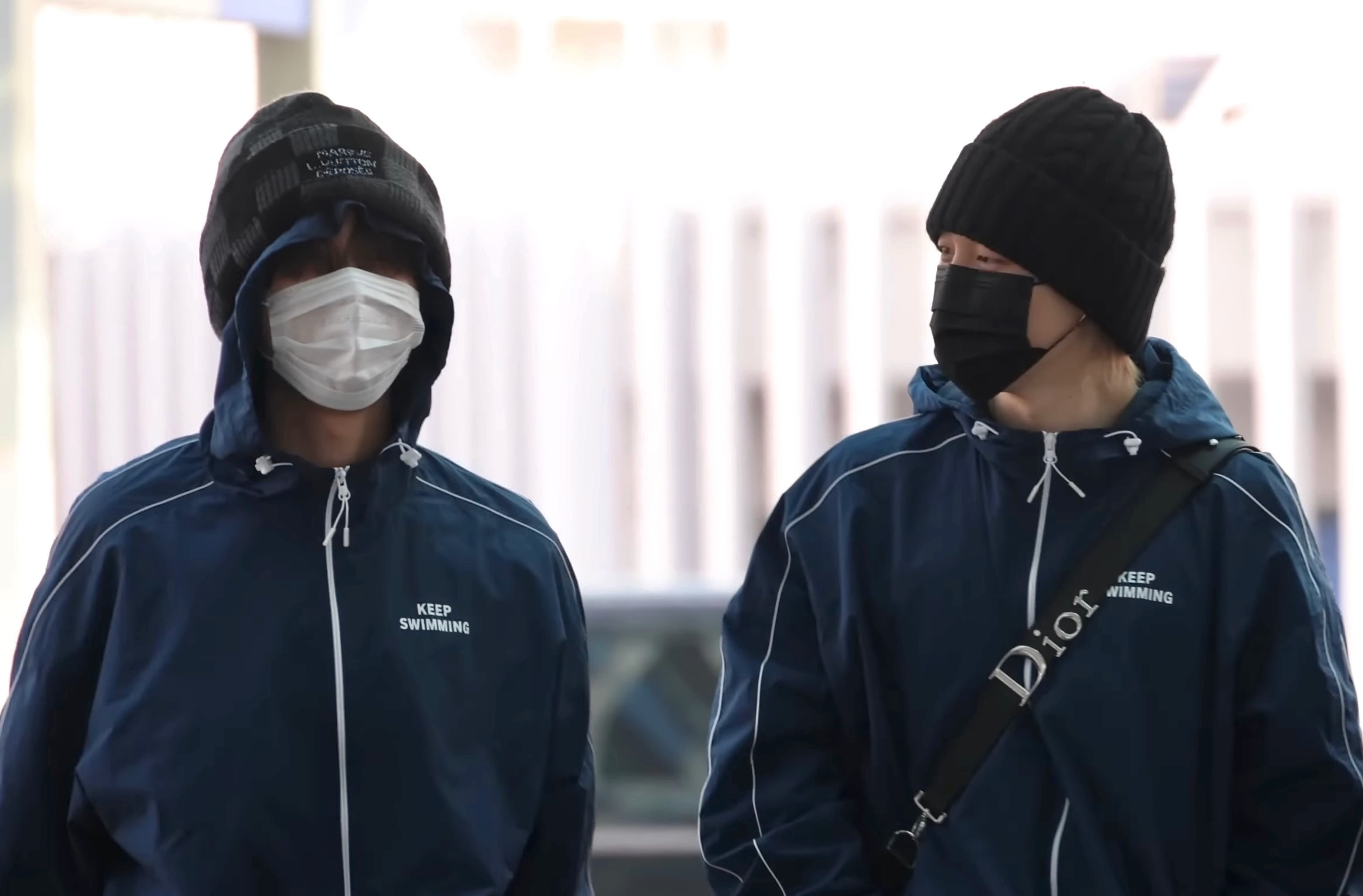
While departing Incheon International Airport and heading to promote in the United States, BTS and their staff wore jackets reading "keep swimming". (J-Hope and Jimin pictured.)

BTS partnered with Spotify for fan immersive event inspired by the nautical theme of the track "Swim". The group released a short-form mini documentary titled "Keep Swimming". The project shows the life and philosophy of prominent individuals in different fields such as director Park Chan-wook and fashion designer Nora Noh.

"Swim" was part of the setlist of the Spotify x BTS: Swimside held at Pier 17 in the New York City For its television debut, BTS performed the song at the Guggenheim Museum for The Tonight Show Starring Jimmy Fallon on March 25, 2026. A live performance video at Sunhyewon, a historic hanok, was published on BTS official YouTube channel. "Swim" was included in the setlist of BTS's Arirang World Tour (2026–2027) which began on April 9.

== Music video ==
The music video for "Swim" was released on YouTube on March 20, 2026. Directed by Tanu Muiño and featuring actress Lili Reinhart alongside BTS, it was filmed against the ocean backdrop of Lisbon and sees the group working on a sailing ship. The music video surpassed 5 million views within an hour, while trending at #1 in 70 countries.

The music video begins with Lili Reinhart strolling through a display of ship models in a museum while examining her compass. When the music starts, the scene transitions to the members steering a massive ship across the ocean. Reinhart later wakes up and explores different areas of the ship. The video concludes with Reinhart overlooking the ocean with a smile before ripping off her necklace engraved with the word "swim".

== Copyright lawsuit ==
In July 2026, several songwriters filed a copyright infringement lawsuit in the United States District Court for the Central District of California against Hybe, Hybe America, Big Hit Music, Hybe Music Services, Artist Publishing Group, and several credited songwriters of "Swim". According to the complaint, the plaintiffs alleged that the song copied protected elements from an unpublished demo they had written in 2025. The complaint sought damages and other relief, including an injunction against further exploitation of the song or, alternatively, songwriting credit and a share of the song's profits. RM, although credited as a songwriter on "Swim", was not named as a defendant.

Big Hit Music denied the allegations, stating that "Swim" is an original work and that the complaint contained only the plaintiffs' unilateral claims. The company said it would respond through the legal process. The lawsuit was withdrawn on November 4, 2026.

== Accolades ==
Award and Nomination for "Swim"
Award Show	Year	Category	Result	Ref.
American Music Awards	2026	Song of the Summer	Won	
Camerimage Film Festival	2026	Best Music Video	Nominated	
Channel R Radio Awards	2026	Best Song	Pending	
The Fact Music Awards	2026	Best Music – Spring	Won	
MAMA Awards	2026	Song of The Year	Nominated	
MAMA Awards	2026	Best Vocal Performance - Group	Nominated	
MAMA Awards	2026	Best Song Top 10	Won	
Melon Music Awards	2026	Song of The Year	Nominated	
MTV Video Music Awards	2026	Song of the Year	Won	
MTV Video Music Awards	2026	Best K-Pop	Won	
MTV Video Music Awards Japan	2026	Video Of The Year	Nominated	
MTV Video Music Awards Japan	2026	Best Group Video-International	Won	
Nickelodeon Kids' Choice Awards	2026	Favorite Song	Won	
Rockbjörnen	2026	Foreign Song of the Year	Nominated	
Sec Awards	2026	International Song of the Year	Nominated	

Music program awards for "Swim"
Program	Date	Ref.
Inkigayo	March 29, 2026	
Inkigayo	April 5, 2026	
Inkigayo	April 12, 2026	
M Countdown	March 26, 2026	
M Countdown	April 2, 2026	
M Countdown	April 9, 2026	
Music Bank	March 27, 2026	
Music Bank	April 3, 2026	
Show Champion	March 25, 2026	
Show Champion	April 1, 2026	
Show Champion	April 8, 2026	
Show! Music Core	April 4, 2026	
Show! Music Core	April 11, 2026	
Show! Music Core	April 18, 2026	

Melon Popularity Award
Award	Date	Ref.
Weekly Popularity Award	March 30, 2026	
Weekly Popularity Award	April 6, 2026	
Weekly Popularity Award	April 13, 2026	
Weekly Popularity Award	April 20, 2026	

== Commercial performance ==
"Swim" debuted at number one on the Billboard Hot 100, marking BTS's sixth song to debut at the top, and their seventh song to top the chart, the most number ones on the chart among groups in nearly half a century. It debuted with 15.3 million streams, 25.8 million in airplay audience, and 154,000 sales, and also debuted at number two on the Streaming Songs, number 18 on the Radio Songs, and number one on the Digital Song Sales chart, making it the group's highest entries on the former two, while becoming its 13th number one on the sales chart.

"Swim" was streamed over 14 million times on Spotify on its first day of release, surpassing 100 million streams on the platform in eight days, being the fastest song of the year to do so. "Swim" also reached number one on the Top 100 chart on Melon an hour after its release, overtaking "Bang Bang" by Ive. The song also debuted at number two on the Official Singles Charts in the UK, marking the group's fifth top 10 hit and highest-ever position on the chart.

"Swim" earned BTS their first number one song in Germany. They also became the first group in German chart history to simultaneously hold the number one position on both the German album and singles charts with two new entries, "Swim" and Arirang. In Brazil, "Swim" debuted at number one on the Brasil Hot 100, becoming the first foreign song to top the chart since the relaunch of Billboard Brasil in August 2023.

== Track listing ==
CD and cassette

1. "Swim" – 2:39

CD and digital single – instrumental

1. "Swim" – 2:39
2. "Swim" (instrumental) – 2:37

Digital remix album – Keep Swimming

1. "Swim" – 2:39
2. "Swim" with RM (chill hip hop remix) – 2:43
3. "Swim" with Jin (alternative rock remix) – 3:13
4. "Swim" with Suga (melodic techno remix) – 3:39
5. "Swim" with J-Hope (Afrobeat remix) – 2:33
6. "Swim" with Jimin (slow jam R&B remix) – 2:29
7. "Swim" with V (electronic remix) – 2:20
8. "Swim" with Jung Kook (acoustic lofi remix) – 2:38
9. "Swim" (instrumental) – 2:37

4-inch vinyl

1. "Swim" – 2:39
2. "Normal" – 3:01

7-inch vinyl and digital single – Underwater remix

1. "Swim" – 2:39
2. "Swim" (Underwater remix) – 2:44
3. "Swim" (instrumental) (Note: Digital only) – 2:37

Digital single – Spring Waves remix

1. "Swim" – 2:39
2. "Swim" (Spring Waves remix) – 2:44
3. "Swim" (instrumental) – 2:37

== Credits and personnel ==
Credits adapted from Apple Music.

- BTS – vocals
  - RM – vocals, composer, lyrics
  - Jung Kook – vocals, background vocals
  - J-Hope – vocals
  - Jimin – vocals
  - Jin – vocals
  - Suga – vocals
  - V – vocals
- James Essien – background vocals, composer, lyrics
- Tyler Spry – guitar, keyboards, background vocals, synthesizer, drum programming, composer, lyrics, producer, vocal producer
- Leclair – producer, keyboards, guitar, bass, drum programming, violin
- Roger Joseph Manning Jr. – keyboards, synthesizer
- Sean Foreman – composer, lyrics
- Jamison Baken – composer, lyrics
- Ryan Tedder – composer, lyrics
- Kirsten Spencer – composer, lyrics
- Derrick Milano – composer, lyrics
- Pdogg – vocal arranger, composer, lyrics, recording engineer, vocal producer
- Serban Ghenea – mixing engineer
- Bryce Bordone – assistant mixing engineer
- Mike Bozzi – mastering engineer
- Yang Ga – immersive mixing engineer, immersive mastering engineer

== Charts ==
=== Weekly charts ===
Weekly chart performance
Chart (2026)	Peak position
Argentina (CAPIF)	1
Australia (ARIA)	4
Austria (Ö3 Austria Top 40)	2
Belarus Airplay (TopHit)	10
Belgium (Ultratop 50 Flanders)	39
Belgium (Ultratop 50 Wallonia)	10
Bolivia (IFPI Latin America)	1
Brazil Hot 100 (Billboard)	1
Bulgaria Airplay (PROPHON)	8
Canada Hot 100 (Billboard)	5
Canada CHR/Top 40 (Billboard)	7
Canada Hot AC (Billboard)	30
Central America Anglo Airplay (Monitor Latino)	1
Chile (Billboard)	1
China (TME Korean)	1
Colombia Airplay (National-Report)	5
Colombia Streaming (Promúsica)	1
CIS Airplay (TopHit)	2
Costa Rica Airplay (Monitor Latino)	15
Costa Rica Streaming (FONOTICA)	4
Croatia (Billboard)	14
Croatia International Airplay (Top lista)	9
Czech Republic Airplay (ČNS IFPI)	34
Czech Republic Singles Digital (ČNS IFPI)	5
Dominican Republic Anglo Airplay (Monitor Latino)	2
Ecuador Airplay (Monitor Latino)	9
Ecuador Streaming (Promúsica)	1
El Salvador Anglo Airplay (Monitor Latino)	3
Estonia Airplay (TopHit)	15
Finland (Suomen virallinen lista)	23
France (SNEP)	9
Germany (GfK)	1
Global 200 (Billboard)	1
Greece International (IFPI)	1
Guatemala Anglo Airplay (Monitor Latino)	2
Honduras Anglo Airplay (Monitor Latino)	4
Hong Kong (Billboard)	1
Hungary (Single Top 40)	10
India (Billboard)	23
India International (IMI)	1
Indonesia (IFPI)	5
Ireland (IRMA)	19
Israel (Mako Hitlist)	56
Italy (FIMI)	33
Italy Airplay (EarOne)	28
Japan Combined Singles (Oricon)	5
Japan Hot 100 (Billboard)	3
Kazakhstan Airplay (TopHit)	8
Latin America Anglo Airplay (Monitor Latino)	2
Latvia Airplay (LaIPA)	9
Latvia Streaming (LaIPA)	1
Luxembourg (Billboard)	10
Lithuania (AGATA)	2
Malaysia (IFPI)	3
Mexico (Billboard)	1
Mexico Streaming (AMPROFON)	1
Middle East and North Africa (IFPI)	1
Moldova Airplay (TopHit)	14
Netherlands (Dutch Top 40)	35
Netherlands (Single Top 100)	20
New Zealand (Recorded Music NZ)	8
Nicaragua Anglo Airplay (Monitor Latino)	1
Nigeria (TurnTable Top 100)	37
Nigeria Airplay (TurnTable)	15
North Africa (IFPI)	3
North Macedonia Airplay (Radiomonitor)	11
Norway (VG-lista)	34
Panama International (PRODUCE)	5
Panama Streaming (PRODUCE)	1
Paraguay (IFPI Latin America)	1
Peru Airplay (Monitor Latino)	12
Peru Streaming (Promúsica)	1
Philippines Hot 100 (Billboard Philippines)	1
Poland Airplay (OLiS)	16
Poland Streaming (OLiS)	14
Portugal (AFP)	2
Puerto Rico Airplay (Monitor Latino)	1
Romania (Billboard)	4
Romania Airplay (UPFR)	4
Romania Airplay (Media Forest)	3
Romania TV Airplay (Media Forest)	20
Russia Airplay (TopHit)	2
Russia Streaming (TopHit)	35
Saudi Arabia (IFPI)	1
Serbia Airplay (Radiomonitor)	7
Singapore (RIAS)	1
Slovakia Airplay (ČNS IFPI)	21
Slovakia Singles Digital (ČNS IFPI)	14
Slovenia Airplay (Radiomonitor)	15
South Africa Airplay (TOSAC)	3
South Africa Streaming (TOSAC)	20
South Korea (Circle)	1
South Korea Hot 100 (Billboard)	1
Spain (Promusicae)	12
Sweden (Sverigetopplistan)	24
Switzerland (Schweizer Hitparade)	3
Taiwan (Billboard)	1
Thailand (IFPI)	1
Turkey (Billboard)	18
Turkey International Airplay (Radiomonitor Türkiye)	4
Ukraine Airplay (TopHit)	7
United Arab Emirates (IFPI)	1
UK Singles (Official Charts)	2
Uruguay Airplay (Monitor Latino)	6
US Billboard Hot 100	1
US Adult Contemporary (Billboard)	16
US Adult Pop Airplay (Billboard)	14
US Dance Airplay (Billboard)	40
US Pop Airplay (Billboard)	11
US Rhythmic Airplay (Billboard)	30
Venezuela Airplay (Record Report)	12
Vietnam (IFPI)	1

=== Monthly charts ===
Monthly chart performance
Chart (2026)	Peak position
Belarus Airplay (TopHit)	10
Brazil Streaming (Pro-Música Brasil)	2
CIS Airplay (TopHit)	3
Estonia Airplay (TopHit)	18
Kazakhstan Airplay (TopHit)	8
Latvia Airplay (TopHit)	16
Lithuania Airplay (TopHit)	3
Moldova Airplay (TopHit)	20
Panama Streaming (PRODUCE)	2
Paraguay Airplay (SGP)	13
Romania Airplay (TopHit)	5
Russia Airplay (TopHit)	3
Russia Streaming (TopHit)	45
South Korea (Circle)	8
Ukraine Airplay (TopHit)	17
Uruguay Streaming (CUD)	8

== Certifications ==
Certifications for "Swim"
Region	Certification	Certified units/sales
Canada (Music Canada)	Platinum	80,000^{‡}
France (SNEP)	Gold	100,000^{‡}
New Zealand (RMNZ)	Gold	15,000^{‡}
Portugal (AFP)	Platinum	25,000^{‡}
Spain (Promusicae)	Gold	50,000^{‡}
United Kingdom (BPI)	Silver	200,000^{‡}
^{‡} Sales+streaming figures based on certification alone.

== Release history ==
Release history and formats for "Swim"
Region	Date	Format(s)	Version	Label	Ref.
Various	March 20, 2026	Digital download; streaming	Original	BigHit	
Various	March 20, 2026	CD single	Original	BigHit	
Various	March 20, 2026	CD single	Original; instrumental	BigHit	
Italy	March 20, 2026	Radio airplay	Original	EMI	
Various	March 23, 2026	Digital download; streaming	Original; instrumental	BigHit	
United States	March 24, 2026	Contemporary hit radio	Original	BigHit	
United States	March 24, 2026	Digital download (Note: The song was available for digital download on the iTunes Store from March 24 to March 26, featuring alternate covers for each member.)	Original	BigHit	
Various	March 27, 2026	Digital download; streaming	Remix album	BigHit	
United States	March 27, 2026	Cassette single	Original	BigHit	
United States	April 3, 2026	Tiny vinyl (4-inch)	Original	BigHit	
Various	April 10, 2026	7-inch vinyl	Original; Underwater remix	BigHit	
Various	April 10, 2026	Digital download; streaming	Original; Underwater remix; instrumental	BigHit	
Various	April 17, 2026	Digital download; streaming	Original; Spring Waves remix; instrumental	BigHit	
