= Permission to Dance on Stage – Live =

Live album by BTS
- Released: July 18, 2025
- Recorded: 2021–2022
- Length: 78:57
- Languages: Korean; English
- Label: BigHit Music
- Producer: Pdogg

BTS chronology
Proof (2022)	Permission to Dance on Stage – Live (2025)	Arirang (2026)

Professional ratings
Review scores
Source	Rating
AllMusic	3.5/5 stars

Permission to Dance on Stage – Live is the first live album by South Korean group BTS, released on July 18, 2025, through BigHit Music. The album was produced from the live performances of the band throughout the Permission to Dance on Stage concerts.

== Background and release ==
On June 30, 2025, BigHit Music revealed the release of a live album that was recorded during Permission to Dance on Stage tour, which spanned across 2021 and 2022 over multiple venues. In the same announcement, release date for the album was set to July 18, 2025.

== Video release ==
Alongside the live album, BigHit Music released a digital code packgage, titled Permission to Dance on Stage - Seoul. The package includes a Weverse digital code for a 141-minute VOD filmed during the final leg of the concert series at Jamsil Sports Complex, as well as a 92-page interview photo book that captures BTS members' on-stage and behind-the-scenes moments.

== Commercial performance ==
Permission to Dance on Stage – Live debuted with 14.5 million streams on Spotify within its first 24 hours of release, marking the biggest debut for a live album in Spotify history and breaking the record previously set by Beyoncé's Homecoming (2019).

In the United States, Permission to Dance on Stage – Live debuted at number 10 on the Billboard 200 (issue dated August 2, 2025), with 43,000 album-equivalent units earned. This figure comprised 36,000 pure sales, making it the second-best-selling album of its release week; 5,000 streaming-equivalent album units (6.58 million on-demand streams); and 2,000 track-equivalent album units. This marked BTS' eighth top-10 album on the Billboard 200, extending their record as the Korean artist with the most top-10 albums on the ranking, and making the band the third artist, behind Metallica and Taylor Swift only, to chart a live album in the top-10 in the 2020s decade. The project is the first live album by a South Korean artist to enter the Billboard charts, and the second live album in general to reach the top-10 in 2025.

== Track listing ==
Permission to Dance on Stage – Live track listing
No.	Title	Writer(s)	Length
1.	"On"	Pdogg, RM, August Rigo, Michel Schulz, Suga, J-Hope, Antonina Armato, Krysta Youngs, Julia Ross	5:31
2.	"Fire" (불타오르네)	Pdogg, "Hitman" Bang, RM, Suga, Devine Channel	3:32
3.	"Dope" (쩔어)	Pdogg, Gwitbangmangi, "Hitman" Bang, RM, Suga, J-Hope	4:21
4.	"DNA"	Pdogg, "Hitman" Bang, KASS, Supreme Boi, Suga, RM	3:48
5.	"Blue & Grey"	Ji Soo Park, Levi, V, Hiss Noise, Suga, RM, J-Hope, Metaphor	4:31
6.	"Black Swan"	Pdogg, RM, Rigo, Vince Nantes, Clyde Kelly	3:23
7.	"Blood Sweat & Tears" (피 땀 눈물)	Pdogg, RM, Suga, J-Hope, "Hitman" Bang, Kim Do-hoon	0:46
8.	"Fake Love"	Pdogg, "Hitman" Bang, RM	4:13
9.	"Life Goes On"	Pdogg, RM, BLVSH, Chris James, Armato, Suga, J-Hope	3:41
10.	"Boy With Luv" (작은 것들을 위한 시; featuring Halsey)	Pdogg, RM, Fontana, Schulz, "Hitman" Bang, Suga, Emily Weisband, J-Hope, Halsey	3:56
11.	"Dynamite"	David Stewart, Jessica Agombar	3:16
12.	"Butter"	Jenna Andrews, Rob Grimaldi, Stephen Kirk, RM, Alex Bilowitz, Sebastian Garcia, Ron Perry	3:16
13.	"Telepathy" (잠시)	Suga, El Capitxn, Hiss Noise, RM, Jung Kook	4:26
14.	"Outro: Wings"	Pdogg, Adora, RM, J-Hope, Suga	3:46
15.	"Stay"	Arston, Jin, Jung Kook, RM	2:16
16.	"So What"	Pdogg, "Hitman" Bang, Adora, RM, Suga, J-Hope	2:54
17.	"Idol"	Pdogg, Supreme Boi, "Hitman" Bang, Ali Tamposi, Roman Campolo, RM	4:22
18.	"Airplane Pt. 2"	Pdogg, RM, Tamposi, Liza Owens, Campolo, "hitman" bang, Suga, J-Hope	1:55
19.	"Silver Spoon" (뱁새)	Pdogg, Supreme Boi, RM, Slow Rabbit	1:33
20.	"Dis-ease" (병)	J-Hope, Ivan Jackson Rosenberg, GHSTLOOP, RM, Pdogg, Suga, Jimin, Randy Runyon	3:56
21.	"Spring Day" (봄날)	Pdogg, RM, Adora, "Hitman" Bang, Arlissa Ruppert, Peter Ibsen, Suga	4:56
22.	"Permission to Dance"	Ed Sheeran, Johnny McDaid, Steve Mac, Andrews	4:39
Total length:			78:57

== Charts ==
=== Weekly charts ===
Weekly chart performance
Chart (2025)	Peak position
Austrian Albums (Ö3 Austria)	9
Belgian Albums (Ultratop Flanders)	38
Belgian Albums (Ultratop Wallonia)	24
Croatian International Albums (HDU)	9
French Albums (SNEP)	15
German Albums (Offizielle Top 100)	9
Greek Albums (IFPI)	1
Hungarian Albums (MAHASZ)	25
Italian Albums (FIMI)	85
Japanese Albums (Oricon)	5
Japanese Combined Albums (Oricon)	6
Japanese Hot Albums (Billboard Japan)	14
Polish Albums (ZPAV)	54
Portuguese Albums (AFP)	22
South Korean Albums (Circle)	2
Spanish Albums (Promusicae)	37
Swiss Albums (Schweizer Hitparade)	18
UK Albums Sales (OCC)	87
US Billboard 200	10
US World Albums (Billboard)	1

=== Monthly charts ===
Monthly chart performance
Chart (2025)	Position
Japanese Albums (Oricon)	13
South Korean Albums (Circle)	5

=== Year-end charts ===
Year-end chart performance
Chart (2025)	Position
South Korean Albums (Circle)	47

== Certifications ==
Certifications
Region	Certification	Certified units/sales
South Korea (KMCA)	Platinum	250,000^{^}
^{^} Shipments figures based on certification alone.

== Release history ==
Release formats for Permission to Dance on Stage – Live
Region	Date	Format	Version	Label	Ref.
Various	July 18, 2025	Digital download; Streaming; CD	Standard	BigHit Music	
