= Arirang (album) =

- Digital and group vinyl cover

Studio album by BTS
- Released: March 20, 2026
- Recorded: July–November 2025
- Genres: Hip-hop; pop
- Length: 41:13
- Languages: English; Korean
- Label: BigHit
- Producers: Sarah Aarons; Sean Cook; Toby Daintree; Artemas Diamandis; Diplo; Donut; El Guincho; Fakeguido; Flume; Ghstloop; Jasper Harris; Sam Homaee; Tyler Johnson; Leclair; Mike Will Made-It; Nitti; Kevin Parker; Pdogg; Picard Brothers; Pluss; Khaled Rohaim; Tyler Spry; Ryan Tedder; Kevin White; Y2K

BTS chronology
Permission to Dance on Stage – Live (2025)	Arirang (2026)

Singles from Arirang
- 1. "Swim" Released: March 20, 2026; 2. "Hooligan" Released: April 7, 2026; 3. "Normal" Released: July 17, 2026

Arirang (stylized in all caps) is the sixth Korean-language and tenth overall studio album by South Korean boy band BTS. (Note: BigHit counts Arirang as BTS' fifth album.) It was released on March 20, 2026, by BigHit Music. The album is the group's first release after their hiatus for each member to complete their military service. It follows their live album Permission to Dance on Stage – Live (2025) and marks their first studio album in nearly six years, after Be (2020).

Arirang was written and composed with other musicians, including Pdogg, Diplo, El Guincho, Ryan Tedder, Jasper Harris, Kevin Parker, Mike Will Made-It, Artemas, and JPEGMafia. The album is a hip hop and pop record, with influences of alternative R&B, synth-pop, EDM and traditional Korean music. It discusses themes of identity, separation, reunion, fame, burnout, resilience, and cultural heritage, with its title alluding to the traditional Korean folk song "Arirang".

Widely anticipated as BTS's comeback release, Arirang generated massive media coverage and anticipation globally upon its release. The album received critical acclaim, with praise for the record's reflective narrative and cohesive production that experiments with various styles. Critics praised the band's lyrical growth and artistic development after their military hiatus. Arirang was a huge commercial success worldwide, debuting at number one in over 25 countries. It became one of the best-selling albums of 2026 and broke streaming records on Spotify and Apple Music. In the United, States, it became BTS's seventh album to debut at number one on the Billboard 200 chart. It also became BTS's best-selling Korean-language album in Japan, and broke records for an Asian act in European nations, including topping the charts in the United Kingdom, Germany, France, and several other countries. To promote the album, BTS embarked on the Arirang World Tour, scheduled from April 2026 to March 2027.

== Background and release ==
On June 14, 2022, BTS announced that they would temporarily suspend their group activities to focus more on solo projects. All members would later enlist in South Korea's mandatory military service from December 2022 to June 2025. In the interim, each member released their solo works: J-Hope with the album Jack in the Box (2022) and EP Hope on the Street Vol. 1 (2024), RM with the albums Indigo (2022) and Right Place, Wrong Person (2024), Jimin with the albums Face (2023) and Muse (2024), Suga with the album D-Day (2023), V with the EP Layover (2023), Jung Kook with the album Golden (2023), and Jin with the EPs Happy (2024) and Echo (2025).

BTS said that they had returned to working together in July 2025, and on August 22, RM said on Weverse that the band was "working diligently" on their new album. On November 1, Jimin told fans that the album was ready for release.

On New Year's Eve 2025, South Korean fans with "Gold Member" status received a postcard teasing the date of the group's comeback. On January 4, 2026, BigHit Music announced the group would come back with an album accompanied by a world tour. The title, Arirang, was revealed on January 15, alluding to the Korean folk song of the same name. BigHit Music stated Arirang "captures BTS' identity as a group that began in Korea". On March 3, BTS revealed the album's track listing and production credits, with the seventh track "Swim" highlighted in black. On March 20, Arirang was released.

=== Format ===
Arirang has five CD versions: "Rooted in Korea", "Rooted in Music", "Living Legend", and the Travel Tag and T-Shirt CD Box Sets. The album was also released in vinyl, including two deluxe versions, a group version, and one version for each member with a different sleeve and color. On April 3, the deluxe vinyl for the album was released, including an exclusive track produced by Suga titled "Come Over".

== Music and lyrics ==
Arirang is primarily a hip-hop and pop record consisting of 14 tracks, with "No. 29" marking the transition between the two genres. The album is named for a well-known Korean folk song that explores themes of love, desire, and separation. The first half is heavily influenced by trap and hip-hop, reminiscent of their early rap albums such as 2014's Dark & Wild, while the second half features "more emotional" and "funky" tracks. In a press release, BTS stated: "The album is tightly structured. We expanded across genres, sounds, and vocal styles. We tried unfamiliar genres and new expressions. It's not perfect, but we're satisfied that we're still evolving".

=== Songs ===
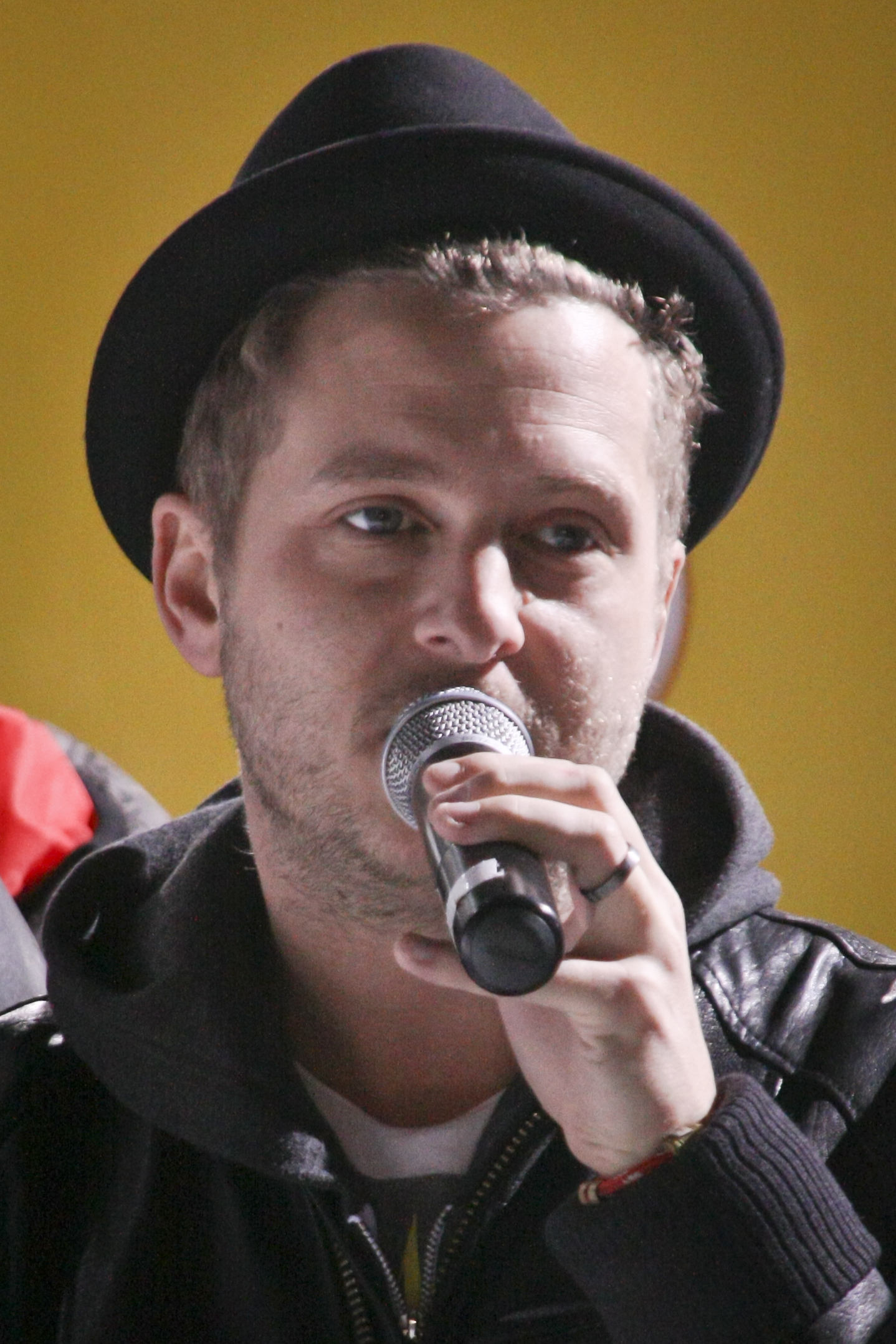
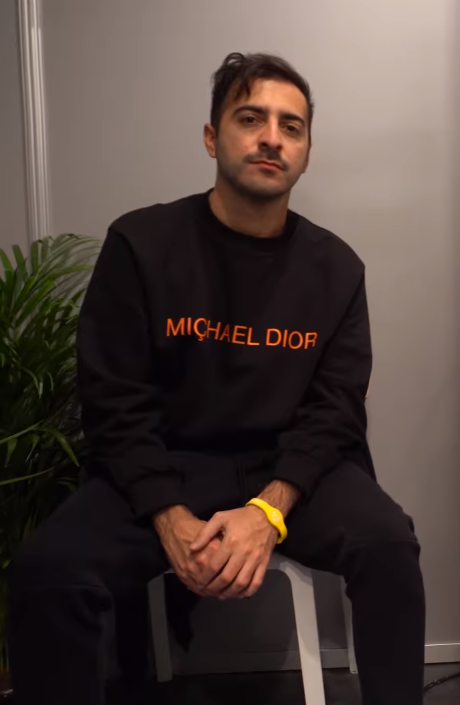
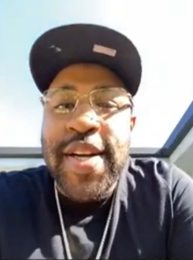
"Swim" is co-written by Ryan Tedder (pictured left), "Hooligan" is co-produced by El Guincho (pictured middle) while Mike Will Made It (pictured right) co-produced "2.0".

The album opens with "Body to Body", which samples the traditional Korean folk song "Arirang". Diplo builds the song using a noisy hip-hop beat, elements of traditional percussion, and sustained harmonic chord. Wren Grave from Consequence described it as a "patriotic song" that reflects on the group's national identity. As the song builds up to its climax, the verse, "The heartbeat of the nation rising up / Be about it, be about it, be about it / You could see about it / Or you read about it", persuades the listeners to be assertive. "Hooligan" features a "chopped-up string arrangement against clashing swords" and "soaring" vocals from V and Jimin. It incorporates an irregular structure with abrupt pauses. Mostly sung in Korean, the lyrics ponder the group's future. "Aliens", an 80s hip-hop inspired track co-produced by Mike WiLL Made-It, reflects on the global rise of BTS and Korean culture as a whole. Kim Gu, one of the leaders of the Korean independence movement known for his belief in cultural strength rather than military force, is mentioned in the line "Pardon me, Kim Gu, tell me how you feel". "Fya" contains elements of pop rap and Jersey club. The song references Britney Spears in its lyrics: "Club go crazy like Britney baby, hit me with it one more time". "2.0" is a rap-heavy song that references BTS's progression as an artist with lyrics such as "We on that brand new" and "2.0 when the update's through".

"No. 29" is a field recording of the Bell of King Seongdeok, the 29th national treasure of Korea. According to RM, the length of the track was set to 1 minute and 38 seconds to match how long the bell vibrates when it is struck. The lead track "Swim" is about going with the flow of life and moving forward despite being pulled off course. It was composed primarily by band leader RM. "Merry Go Round" is a psychedelic rock song which relates to the sensation of being trapped by internal and external pressures. Kevin Parker's inputs makes it recognizable to Tame Impala listeners.

Body to Body
"Body to Body" features a sample of the Korean folk ballad Gyeonggi Arirang.

"Normal" is influenced by current pop music with its edgy lyrical style. The track revolves around the theme of navigating between public attention and private life. Lyrically, it highlights coping with the public remarks while being expected to smile for the cameras. "Like Animals" is a pop rock ballad. It was written by British musician Artemas and produced by Diplo. Maria Letícia L. Gomes of Clash stated that the track "feels less distinctive but serves a structural purpose, easing the shift away from the heavier, synth-driven first half" and transitions into an "unexpected guitar-led outro" which introduces a more natural sound. "'They don't know 'bout us", a co-production with Y2K, is an old hip-hop and trap with lyrics affirming the path they have taken. The song's lyrics dismiss the idea that they are unusual. J-hope remarked on people's perception of BTS in lyrics such as "'Those guys are so special among Asians', aye / 'Some kinda heroic beings, too hard to break', uh". "One More Night", with a '90s house instrumental with a "plinking Korg M1 synth melody", focuses on the theme of fantasy, repeating the word throughout the song. "Please" is a love song about "the desire to stay together". "Into the Sun" is a "vocoder-drenched" alternative R&B track.

The deluxe vinyl edition includes a fifteenth track, "Come Over", co-produced by Suga and co-written by RM and J-Hope. Musically, it blends pop with resonant vocals and a fast-paced rhythm reminiscent of stadium anthems; the lyrics, dedicated to their fans, speak of the feeling of finding a loved one and asking for their hospitality in a moment when one feels lost.

== Promotion ==
To promote the album, BTS was featured in magazines like GQ and Rolling Stone. The group also made appearances and gave interviews on online and radio shows such as Apple Music 1's Zane Lowe Show,Audacy Check In, Elvis Duran and the Talk Show Wired Autocomplete Interview, Vogue Now Serving, and Hot Ones.

=== Marketing ===
On February 14, thousands of roses were distributed throughout major cities like Seoul, London, and Los Angeles. The installations included QR codes, and signs that asked, "What is your love song?". They partnered with Google Search to launch a scavenger hunt feature on March 4, with additional sealed quests being unlocked on March 9 and 16. Searching for "BTS" gave rise to a graphic of a blue ship in a bottle, which, upon being clicked, launched a series of trivia questions themed around the group to earn parchment cards with handwritten song titles by the members. On March 10, BTS and Spotify announced their "Swimside" partnership campaign, which includes pop-up events worldwide, in-app experiences, and exclusive material from the group. The group drops hints about the album through "Decoding Arirang". Fans explored Spotify for surprises from the members themselves as part of the in-app Easter egg hunt. On March 16, 2026, Hybe announced a project to mark the release of the album and start of the tour called 'BTS THE CITY ARIRANG SEOUL'. It included activities and programs such as landmark lighting, drone show, listening party, and pop-ups. BTS: The Return, a documentary on the making of the album, premiered on March 27, 2026. BTS collaborated with Arte Museum for an immersive exhibition in cities like Las Vegas, New York, and Busan.

=== Performances ===
The group held a concert, entitled BTS The Comeback Live | Arirang, at Gwanghwamun Square on March 21, 2026. The concert was exclusively streamed on Netflix, marking the first time on the platform where a concert was streamed live as opposed to being taped as a concert film. The livestream drew 18.4 million global viewers, reaching the weekly Netflix top 10 in 80 countries and the number-one spot in 24 countries. BTS performed "2.0", "Normal", and "Swim" at Pier 17 in New York for their Spotify x BTS: Swimside event. On March 25 and 26, they performed "Swim" and "2.0" at the Guggenheim Museum on The Tonight Show Starring Jimmy Fallon. BTS performed "Hooligan" at the 2026 American Music Awards on May 25, 2026. The performance was pre-recorded at the Allegiant Stadium in Las Vegas.

=== Tour ===
BigHit Music announced the Arirang World Tour on January 4, 2026. Spanning 85 dates in 34 cities, it kicked off on April 9, 2026, in Goyang, South Korea, and is set to conclude on March 14, 2027, in Manila, Philippines.

== Critical reception ==
Professional ratings
Aggregate scores
Source	Rating
AnyDecentMusic?	7.7/10
Metacritic	83/100
Review scores
Source	Rating
AllMusic	4.5/5 stars
Associated Press	4/5 stars
Clash	8/10
Consequence	B+
The Guardian	4/5 stars
IZM	2.5/5 stars
NME	4/5 stars
Pitchfork	5.3/10
Rolling Stone	4.5/5 stars
The Telegraph	4/5 stars

According to the review aggregator Metacritic, Arirang received "universal acclaim" based on a weighted average score of 83 out of 100 from nine critic scores. The review aggregator AnyDecentMusic? gave the album a weighted average score of 7.7 out of 10 from seven critic scores.

In a positive review for NPR, Sheldon Pearce called Arirang a "triumphant homecoming", writing that BTS "has never felt more connected, inwardly or to its calling", while Jon Caramanica of The New York Times awarded Arirang a "Critic's Pick" label, writing that "Arirang doesn't pander, and it doesn't overwhelm. Rather, it feels borderline experimental, as close to risky as a project engineered for minimal risk can be". Maria Sherman's four-star review for the Associated Press stated that Arirang showcases "a band atop the music world, returning to their throne on their own terms: with bilingual bangers and avant-garde ambitions", while in a positive review for the BBC, Mark Savage applauded Arirang for helping BTS "rekindle their fire" and said that the album represents "a genuine return to form".

Michael Cragg from The Guardian wrote in his four-star review: "On Arirang, [BTS has] made an album that makes good on their status as the planet's biggest pop phenomenon, and that's more than enough". In his four-star review for The Telegraph, Ed Power wrote that "[BTS] are back to reassert their dominance with a maximalist record brimming with monster-truck grooves and choruses so vast and glittering you could probably detect them from outer space". In The Korea Times, Pyo Kyung-min wrote in a positive review that "the album does not merely revisit familiar formulas, but instead, it demonstrates how the members' individual artistic growth during their solo era and military hiatus has deepened the group's collective voice".

In Rolling Stone, Rob Sheffield awarded the album 4.5 stars and wrote that "Arirang shows off [BTS's] collective bravado, ready to take over where they left off as world-beating pop studs", while Joseph Kocharian, in a five-star review for the UK edition, called Arirang "K-pop perfection" that is "curated with the utmost care". In an 8 out of 10 review, Clash's Maria Letícia L. Gomes wrote: "The fourteen tracks make for a more mature body of work – one that trades the glossy, slightly on-the-nose singles of 'Butter' or 'Dynamite' for something more layered".

Wren Graves from Consequence gave the album a B+ score, writing that "the solo years gave each member a sharper creative identity, and RM's instincts hold the whole thing together — his collaborator list...reads like the playlist of someone who listens to everything and thinks about it after". In a four-star review, Rhian Daly wrote in NME that "after nearly four years, BTS are back doing what they do best – serving as both ambassadors and explorers, fuelled by curiosity and creativity". Colette Balmain, in a five-star review for View of the Arts, praised the album for being "BTS's most accomplished album to date".

In a mixed review for Pitchfork, Joshua Minsoo Kim wrote that "[Arirang's] generic songs ring hollow and lack the vim and vigor of the band's best work". In Vulture, Craig Jenkins wrote in a mixed review that Arirang "is a work of both delicate and unsubtle tensions" that "manages an accomplished if intermittently absurd balancing act". Han Seong-hyeon of IZM criticized a lack of teamwork and storytelling in the album, and noted that the large amount of international producers, along with the low proportion of Korean lyrics, makes the title Arirang feel like "a MacGuffin".

== Accolades ==
On July 29, 2026, BTS announced that they would not submit music from Arirang for consideration at the 69th Annual Grammy Awards, a decision that was widely interpreted by the press as an implicit protest against the newly-introduced Best Asian Pop Music Performance category. In their statement, posted by each member, BTS said: "I hope that music can be heard and loved for what it is, rather than being divided by region or language." BTS's boycott of the category led to broader discussion, with some critics and artists arguing that creating a separate category for Asian pop risked ghettoization of Asian acts away from general-field categories such as Album of the Year or Song of the Year. The Recording Academy's president, Harvey Mason, Jr., said that he was "saddened" by BTS's decision but understood and respected it.

Awards and nominations for "Arirang"
Award show	Year	Category	Result	Ref.
ARIA Music Awards	2026	Most Popular International Artist (Note: Despite the category's name, each nominee was nominated alongside their album)	Won	
Korea Grand Music Awards	2026	Best Selling Album	Won	
KM Chart Awards	2026	Album of the Year (Daesang)	Won	
K-World Dream Awards	2026	Best Album Award	Won	
MAMA Awards	2026	Album of The Year	Won	
Melon Music Awards	2026	Album of The Year	Won	
Nickelodeon Kids' Choice Awards	2026	Favorite Album	Won	
Sec Awards	2026	International Album/EP of the Year	Nominated	
SPOTV K-Pop Awards	2026	Best Album of the Year (Daesang)	Won	

== Commercial performance ==
Arirang's fourteen tracks filled the top fourteen spots of Spotify's global top fifty chart on its first day. The album received a total of 110 million streams on the service, making it the most first-day Spotify streams for any 2026 album so far. On Apple Music, the album broke the record for most first-day streams for a pop group's album. The tracks from Arirang debuted in the top nine spots on the Billboard Global 200, tying Taylor Swift for both the most top ten in a single week and the most titles from number one on down with her album The Tortured Poets Department. BTS also became the first act to occupy the top thirteen spots on the Billboard Global Excl. U.S.

=== North America ===
Arirang debuted at number one on the US Billboard 200, earning 641,000 album-equivalent units in its first week, of which 532,000 were pure album sales. It is the largest week by units for a group since the chart began calculating units in December 2014, BTS's best US sales week, and their seventh US number one album. Vinyl sales totaled 208,000, making it both BTS's best vinyl sales week and the biggest by a group in the contemporary era since Luminate started electronically tracking sales in 1991. Additionally, it's the sixth-biggest album vinyl sales week in modern history. In its first eligible week on the US Billboard Hot 100, all the songs (except "No. 29") from Arirang charted, with "Swim" topping the chart. On the service's United States chart, twelve of the album's tracks appeared in the top twenty-six spots of the Spotify US chart. In its second week, Arirang remained atop the US Billboard 200, their first album to do so. It also reigned on top for a third straight week, the first album from a group to do so since 2012 (Mumford & Sons' Babel). In Canada, BTS achieved their sixth number one at Billboard Canadian Albums. Thirteen tracks from the album charted on the Canadian Hot 100.

=== Asia ===
In South Korea, the album debuted at the top of the Circle Album Chart and sold 4.2 million copies in its first week. The album broke the group's previous record of 3.37 million copies set by Map of the Soul: 7 in 2020 on the Hanteo Chart. In Japan, Arirang debuted at number one on the Oricon Weekly Album Chart and sold 547,000 copies in its first week. It also marks the group's seventh number one on the chart since their previous album, Proof, in 2022. The album generated 11,851 downloads, the most for a foreign act and tenth most overall in chart history. It was certified triple platinum by Recording Industry Association of Japan after selling more than 750,000 copies in eleven days after its release.

=== Europe ===
Arirang debuted at number one on the GfK charts in Germany. At the same time, lead single "Swim" debuted at number one on the singles chart, making BTS the first group in German chart history to simultaneously chart at number one on both the album and singles charts with two new entries. In the United Kingdom, the band achieved their third number one album at the Official Album Chart. The album topped the album charts in France. According to SNEP, Arirang surpassed 100,000 equivalent sales, which includes physical sales, downloads, and streams. It also became the BTS fourth album to achieve platinum in France.

== Track listing ==
Standard track listing
No.	Title	Writer(s)	Producer(s)	Length
1.	"Body to Body"	Ryan Tedder; Maxime Picard; Thomas Pentz; Akira Evans; Teezo Touchdown; Pdogg; RM; Suga; J-Hope; Kirsten Spencer	Picard Brothers; Diplo; Ryan Tedder; Pdogg^{[p]}	3:09
2.	"Hooligan"	Pablo Diaz Reixa; Michel Magne; Pablo Martinez Alborch; Marcus Lomax; Xplicit; Jung Kook; Delacey; Jasper Harris; RM; J-Hope; Suga; Derrick Milano; Pdogg; Kirsten Spencer	El Guincho; Fakeguido; Jasper Harris; Ghstloop^{[v]}	3:02
3.	"Aliens"	Michael Williams II; RM; Asheton Hogan; Brandon Bell; Khaled Rohaim; Charles Hinshaw; Jean Marcel Day Jr.; James Essein; J-Hope; Jung Kook; Suga; John Mitchell; Derrick Milano; Pdogg	Mike Will Made-It; Pluss; Donut; Khaled Rohaim; Pdogg^{[v]}	2:47
4.	"Fya"	Harley Streten; Gregory Aldae Hein; JPEGMafia; Thomas Pentz; Kurtis Wells; RM; Jung Kook; Richard Mears IV; Suga	Diplo; Flume; Nitti	3:00
5.	"2.0"	Williams; Asheton Hogan; Atia Boggs; Charles Hinshaw; RM; J-Hope; V; Jung Kook; John Mitchell; Derrick Milano; Pdogg; Suga	Mike Will Made-It; Pluss	2:49
6.	"No. 29"			1:38
7.	"Swim"	James Essein; Sean Foreman; Tyler Spry; Jamison Baken; Ryan Tedder; RM; Kirsten Spencer; Derrick Milano; Pdogg	Leclair; Spry^{[p]}; Pdogg^{[v]}	2:39
8.	"Merry Go Round"	Sam Homaee; Sarah Aarons; Gregory Aldae Hein; Kevin Parker; RM; Suga; J-Hope; Derrick Milano; Pdogg	Kevin Parker; Homaee^{[p]}; Aarons^{[p]}; Aldae^{[v]}; Ghstloop^{[v]}	3:49
9.	"Normal"	Sean Foreman; Livvi Franc; Ryan Tedder; Sean Cook; RM; J-Hope; Suga; Kirsten Spencer; Derrick Milano; Pdogg	Tedder^{[p]}; Cook^{[p]}	3:01
10.	"Like Animals"	Thomas Pentz; Artemas Diamandis; Toby Daintree; Jesse Fink; Kevin White; RM; Kirsten Spencer; Beau Nox	Diplo; Artemas Diamandis; Toby Daintree; Kevin White	3:09
11.	"They Don't Know 'bout Us"	Pdogg; Ghstloop; Ari Starrace; Rug; Kurtis Wells; Jimin; RM; Suga; J-Hope	Pdogg; Ghstloop; Y2K	2:44
12.	"One More Night"	Thomas Pentz; Pdogg; Beau Nox; Mears; RM; Suga; J-Hope; Ant Clemons	Diplo; Pdogg; Nitti	2:47
13.	"Please"	Tyler Spry; James Essein; Ryan Tedder; RM; Suga; J-Hope	Spry^{[p]}	2:52
14.	"Into the Sun"	Pdogg; Thomas Pentz; V; Jimin; Teezo Touchdown; Ki-An Dee Kambaran; Mears; Tyler Johnson; Ghstloop; RM; Suga; J-Hope	Pdogg; Diplo; Tyler Johnson; Nitti; Ghstloop	3:47
Total length:				41:13

Deluxe vinyl bonus track
No.	Title	Writer(s)	Producer(s)	Length
15.	"Come Over"	Henry Walter; Joshua Coleman; Suga; Jacob Kasher Hindlin; Gregory Aldae Hein; RM; J-Hope; El Capitxn	Cirkut; Ammo; Suga	2:58
Total length:				42:52

613 edition bonus tracks
No.	Title	Writer(s)	Producer(s)	Length
15.	"Voice Message: Love Song"			1:35
16.	"Normal" (Korean Ver.)	Foreman; Franc; Tedder; Cook; RM; J-Hope; Suga; Spencer; Derrick Milano; Pdogg	Tedder^{[p]}; Cook^{[p]}	3:01
Total length:				44:30

=== Notes ===
- ^{^[p]} denotes someone credited for both primary and vocal production.
- ^{^[v]} denotes a vocal producer.
- "Body to Body" contains excerpts from "Arirang", performed by Kang Hyo-ju, Lee Na-hyeon, Ha Ji-a and Shin Su-jeong in the 2007 KBS television special 추석 특집 민요잔치 <달아 달아 밝은 달아> (lit. Chuseok Special Folk Song Festival: Moon, Moon, Bright Moon).
- "Hooligan" contains excerpts from "Yang Tse-Kiang", written and performed by Michel Magne.
- "Fya", "Swim", and "Normal" are stylized in all caps.
- "They Don't Know 'bout Us" is stylized in lowercase.
- "No. 29" is 19 seconds long on physical versions of the album.

== Personnel ==
Credits adapted from Tidal.

=== Musicians ===
- BTS – vocals (all tracks except track 6)
  - Jung Kook – background vocals (tracks 1–5, 7–10, 12–15)
  - V – background vocals (tracks 2, 14)
  - J-Hope – background vocals (tracks 3, 5)
  - RM – background vocals (tracks 3, 5, 8, 11–13)
  - Suga – background vocals (tracks 3, 5); bass, drums, guitar, synthesizer, programming (track 15)
  - Jimin – background vocals (track 11)
  - Jin – background vocals (track 7-13)
- Picard Brothers – bass, drum programming, synthesizer (track 1)
- Ryan Tedder – bass, drum programming, synthesizer (track 1); drums, keyboards, programming (track 9); background vocals (track 13)
- Pdogg – drum programming (track 1); keyboards, programming (track 11); synthesizer (track 12); bass (track 14)
- Akira Akira – synthesizer (track 1)
- Diplo – synthesizer (track 1); drums, programming (tracks 4, 12, 14)
- Teezo Touchdown – background vocals (track 1)
- El Guincho – programming, bass, drum programming, sampler, synthesizer (track 2)
- Fakeguido – drum programming (track 2)
- Jasper Harris – programming, sampler (track 2)
- Daoud – piano (track 2)
- Ghstloop – sampler (track 2); drums, keyboards, programming, synthesizer (track 11)
- Mike Will Made-It – drum programming, keyboards (tracks 3, 5); synthesizer (track 5)
- Pluss – drum programming, keyboards (tracks 3, 5); synthesizer (track 5)
- Donut – synthesizer (track 3)
- Khaled Rohaim – synthesizer (track 3)
- Flume – drums, programming (track 4)
- Nitti – drums, programming (tracks 4, 12, 14); synthesizer (tracks 4, 12); bass, guitar (track 14)
- Leclair – bass, drum programming, guitar, keyboards, violin (track 7)
- Tyler Spry – drum programming, guitar, keyboards, synthesizer, background vocals (tracks 7, 13); bass (track 13)
- Joseph Manning Jr. – keyboards (tracks 7, 13), synthesizer (track 7), piano (track 13)
- James Essien – background vocals (tracks 7, 13)
- Sarah Aarons – synthesizer, background vocals (track 8)
- Kevin Parker – bass, guitar, synthesizer (track 8)
- Sam Homaee – drums, guitar, synthesizer (track 8)
- Aldae – background vocals (track 8)
- Derrick Milano – background vocals (track 8)
- Sean Cook – drums, guitar, keyboards, programming (track 9)
- Toby Daintree – bass, guitar, keyboards, synthesizer (track 10)
- Kevin White – drum programming (track 10)
- Y2K – synthesizer (track 11)
- Phillip A. Peterson – cello (track 13)
- Alisa Zayalith – background vocals (track 13)
- Dawson Daugherty – background vocals (track 13)
- Tyler Johnson – drums, programming (track 14)
- Ryan Scott – guitar (track 14)
- Kaien Cruz – background vocals (track 14)
- Cirkut – bass, drums, synthesizer, programming (track 15)
- Ammo – synthesizer, programming (track 15)

=== Technical ===
- Mike Bozzi – mastering
- Mark "Spike" Stent – mixing (tracks 1, 10–11, 13–14)
- Kieran Beardmore – assistant mixing (tracks 1, 10–11, 13–14)
- Manny Marroquin – mixing (tracks 2, 13)
- Chris Galland – assistant mixing (tracks 2, 13)
- Francesco Di Giovanni – assistant mixing (tracks 2, 13)
- Ramiro Fernandez-Seoane – assistant mixing (tracks 2, 13)
- Jaycen Joshua – mixing (tracks 3, 5)
- Chris Bhikoo – assistant mixing (tracks 3, 5)
- Jacob Richards – assistant mixing (tracks 3, 5)
- Mike Seaberg – assistant mixing (tracks 3, 5)
- Tom Norris – mixing (track 4)
- Serban Ghenea – mixing (tracks 7, 9)
- Alex Ghenea – mixing (track 8)
- Yang Ga – mixing (track 15)
- Bryce Bordone – assistant mixing (tracks 7–8)
- Jack Normile – assistant mixing (track 8)
- Pdogg – recording engineering (tracks 1–5, 7–9, 11–15), vocal arrangement (tracks 1–5, 7, 9–14),
- Ghstloop – recording engineering (tracks 2, 8, 10, 11), vocal arrangement (tracks 2, 8, 11)
- Ryan Tedder – recording engineer (track 9)
- Sean Cook – recording engineer (track 9)
- Owen Stoutt – recording engineer (track 14)
- Robert Palma – recording engineer (track 15)
- Cirkut – recording engineer (track 15)

== Charts ==
=== Weekly charts ===
Weekly chart performance for Arirang
Chart (2026)	Peak position
Australian Albums (ARIA)	1
Austrian Albums (Ö3 Austria)	1
Belgian Albums (Ultratop Flanders)	1
Belgian Albums (Ultratop Wallonia)	1
Canadian Albums (Billboard)	1
Croatian International Albums (HDU)	1
Czech Albums (ČNS IFPI)	1
Danish Albums (Hitlisten)	2
Dutch Albums (Album Top 100)	1
Finnish Albums (Suomen virallinen lista)	3
French Albums (SNEP)	1
German Albums (Offizielle Top 100)	1
German Pop Albums (Offizielle Top 100)	1
Greek Albums (IFPI)	1
Hungarian Albums (MAHASZ)	1
Irish Albums (Official Charts)	1
Italian Albums (FIMI)	2
Japanese Albums (Oricon)	1
Japanese Combined Albums (Oricon)	1
Japanese Hot Albums (Billboard Japan)	1
Lithuanian Albums (AGATA)	1
New Zealand Albums (RMNZ)	1
Nigerian Albums (TurnTable)	15
Norwegian Albums (IFPI Norge)	1
Polish Albums (ZPAV)	1
Portuguese Albums (AFP)	1
Scottish Albums (Official Charts)	1
Slovak Albums (ČNS IFPI)	1
South Korean Albums (Circle)	1
Spanish Albums (Promusicae)	1
Swedish Albums (Sverigetopplistan)	2
Swiss Albums (Schweizer Hitparade)	1
UK Albums (Official Charts)	1
US Billboard 200	1

=== Monthly charts ===
Monthly chart performance for Arirang
Chart (2026)	Peak position
German Vinyl Albums (Offizielle Top 100)	1
Japanese Albums (Oricon)	1
South Korean Albums (Circle)	1

== Certifications and sales ==
Certifications and sales
Region	Certification	Certified units/sales
Austria (IFPI Austria)	Gold	7,500^{‡}
Canada (Music Canada)	Platinum	80,000^{‡}
Denmark (IFPI Danmark)	Gold	10,000^{‡}
France (SNEP)	Platinum	137,800
Germany (BVMI)	Gold	75,000^{‡}
Italy (FIMI)	Platinum	50,000^{‡}
Japan (RIAJ) Physical	3× Platinum	750,000^{^}
New Zealand (RMNZ)	Gold	7,500^{‡}
Portugal (AFP)	3× Platinum	21,000^{‡}
South Korea (KMCA)	4× Million	4,000,000^{^}
South Korea (KMCA) Weverse Albums	Platinum	250,000^{^}
Spain (Promusicae)	Platinum	40,000^{‡}
United Kingdom (BPI)	Gold	100,000^{‡}
^{^} Shipments figures based on certification alone.^{‡} Sales+streaming figures based on certification alone.

== Release history ==
Region	Date	Format(s)	Version	Label	Ref.
Various	March 20, 2026	CD; vinyl LP; digital download; streaming	Standard	BigHit	
Japan	March 21, 2026	CD; vinyl LP; digital download; streaming	Standard	BigHit	
United States	April 1, 2026	CD	Standard	BigHit	
Various	April 3, 2026	Vinyl LP	Deluxe	BigHit	
Japan	May 1, 2026	CD	Box set	BigHit	
Various	May 4, 2026	CD	Box set	BigHit	
Various	June 12, 2026	Vinyl LP	613 Picture disc	BigHit	
Japan	July 10, 2026	Vinyl LP	613 Picture disc	BigHit	
United States	July 17, 2026	Vinyl LP	613 Picture disc	BigHit	
