= Body to Body (song) =

2026 song by BTS

Song by BTS

from the album Arirang
- Released: March 20, 2026
- Recorded: July–November 2025
- Genre: hip-hop; pop rap
- Length: 3:09
- Label: BigHit
- Songwriters: Ryan Tedder; Maxime Picard; Thomas Pentz; Akira Evans; Teezo Touchdown; Kang Hyo-won; RM; Suga; J-Hope; Kirsten Spencer
- Producers: Picard Brothers; Diplo; Tedder; Pdogg

"Body to Body" is a song by South Korean boy band BTS, released on March 20, 2026, on their tenth studio album, Arirang. Produced by Diplo, Pdogg, the Picard Brothers and Ryan Tedder, it contains a sample of the Korean folk song "Arirang", performed by Kang Hyo-ju, Lee Na-hyeon, Ha Ji-a and Shin Su-jeong.

== Composition ==
"Body to Body" is a pop rap song. It commences with a "futuristic, almost mechanical" intro, followed by a clattering hip-hop beat, processed vocals and "droning" chords, while the latter half incorporates elements of traditional Korean music, notably in the bridge with an echoing sample of "Arirang", performed by Kang Hyo-ju, Lee Na-hyeon, Ha Ji-a and Shin Su-jeong in the 2007 KBS television special 추석 특집 민요잔치 <달아 달아 밝은 달아> (lit. Chuseok Special Folk Song Festival: Moon, Moon, Bright Moon). Each member of BTS performs on the track, including Korean rap verses. The style has been compared to that of "2005 vintage Justin Timberlake", Psy and "'Firestarter'-era Prodigy". Music critics have interpreted the song as an ode to the band's cultural roots.

== Critical reception ==
The song received critical acclaim, with particular praise directed toward its incorporation of the traditional Korean folk song "Arirang", which critics noted for adding cultural depth and a distinctive sonic element. It was further recognized as an effective album opener and highlighted as one of the standout tracks on the album. Nicole Fell of The Hollywood Reporter considered it the "perfect concert opener" because of its introduction and starting line, "I need the whole stadium to jump". Neil Z. Yeung of AllMusic wrote "With the famous 'Arirang' folk song refrain echoing in the background during the coda, listeners know they are in for a ride." Michael Cragg of The Guardian commented that RM, Suga and J-Hope "sound as if they're having a lot of fun". Pyo Kyung-min of The Korea Times stated that the song "integrates a smoothly reworked motif of the traditional 'Arirang' melody that comes off as iconic rather than nostalgic." Jon Caramanica of The New York Times described the song as "bulbous and springy". Han Seong-hyeon of IZM said "If you can endure the ending where a line from the folk song ‘Arirang’ appears, the intimidation of ‘Body to Body’ placed at the bow is considerable" and highlighted the song as "추천" (lit. "recommended").

== Charts ==
=== Weekly charts ===
Weekly chart performance
| Chart (2026) | Peak position |
|---|---|
| Argentina Hot 100 (Billboard) | 34 |
| Australia (ARIA) | 26 |
| Austria (Ö3 Austria Top 40) | 20 |
| Bolivia (Billboard) | 3 |
| Brazil Hot 100 (Billboard) | 4 |
| Canada Hot 100 (Billboard) | 20 |
| Chile (Billboard) | 5 |
| China (TME Korean) | 1 |
| Colombia Hot 100 (Billboard) | 25 |
| Colombia Streaming (Promúsica) | 19 |
| Costa Rica Streaming (FONOTICA) | 16 |
| Czech Republic Singles Digital (ČNS IFPI) | 22 |
| Ecuador (Billboard) | 8 |
| Ecuador Streaming (Promúsica) | 11 |
| Finland (Suomen virallinen lista) | 43 |
| France (SNEP) | 47 |
| Germany (GfK) | 19 |
| Global 200 (Billboard) | 2 |
| Greece International (IFPI) | 5 |
| Honduras Anglo Airplay (Monitor Latino) | 2 |
| Hong Kong (Billboard) | 2 |
| Hungary (Single Top 40) | 28 |
| India International (IMI) | 2 |
| Indonesia (Billboard) | 12 |
| Ireland (IRMA) | 47 |
| Italy (FIMI) | 92 |
| Japan Combined Singles (Oricon) | 23 |
| Japan Hot 100 (Billboard) | 17 |
| Latvia Streaming (LaIPA) | 3 |
| Lithuania (AGATA) | 6 |
| Luxembourg (Billboard) | 23 |
| Malaysia (IFPI) | 7 |
| Malaysia International (RIM) | 3 |
| Mexico (Billboard) | 10 |
| Middle East and North Africa (IFPI) | 6 |
| Netherlands (Single Top 100) | 47 |
| New Zealand (Recorded Music NZ) | 27 |
| Norway (VG-lista) | 78 |
| North Africa (IFPI) | 14 |
| Panama Streaming (PRODUCE) | 9 |
| Peru (Billboard) | 2 |
| Peru Streaming (Promúsica) | 3 |
| Philippines Hot 100 (Billboard Philippines) | 9 |
| Poland Streaming (OLiS) | 29 |
| Romania (Billboard) | 8 |
| Russia Streaming (TopHit) | 63 |
| Singapore (RIAS) | 2 |
| Slovakia Singles Digital (ČNS IFPI) | 33 |
| South Africa Streaming (TOSAC) | 51 |
| South Korea (Circle) | 4 |
| South Korea Hot 100 (Billboard) | 3 |
| Spain (Promusicae) | 41 |
| Sweden (Sverigetopplistan) | 63 |
| Switzerland (Schweizer Hitparade) | 20 |
| Taiwan (Billboard) | 2 |
| Thailand (IFPI) | 13 |
| United Arab Emirates (IFPI) | 4 |
| UK Singles (Official Charts) | 28 |
| US Billboard Hot 100 | 25 |
| Vietnam (IFPI) | 2 |

=== Monthly charts ===
Monthly chart performance
| Chart (2026) | Peak position |
|---|---|
| Brazil Streaming (Pro-Música Brasil) | 27 |
| Panama Streaming (PRODUCE) | 38 |
| Russia Streaming (TopHit) | 81 |
| South Korea (Circle) | 18 |

== Certifications ==
Certifications for "Body to Body"
| Region | Certification | Certified units/sales |
|---|---|---|
| Canada (Music Canada) | Gold | 40,000^{‡} |
^{‡} Sales+streaming figures based on certification alone.
