= 2.0 (song) =

Song by BTS

from the album Arirang
- Released: March 20, 2026
- Genre: hip-hop
- Length: 2:49
- Label: BigHit
- Songwriters: Mike Will Made-It; Asheton Hogan; Atia Boggs; Charles Hinshaw; RM; J-Hope; V; Jung Kook; John Mitchell; Derrick Milano; Pdogg; Suga
- Producers: Mike Will Made-It; Pluss

Music video
- "2.0" on YouTube

"2.0" is a song by South Korean boy band BTS from their tenth studio album, Arirang, released on March 20, 2026. It was produced by Mike Will Made-It and Pluss. An accompanying music video was released on April 1.

== Composition ==
A hip-hop and trap song produced by Mike Will Made-It and Pluss, "2.0" has been compared to BTS's earlier hip-hop work. Among the song's writers are five BTS members: RM, Suga, J-Hope, V, and Jung Kook.

"2.0" has been described as representing BTS's progression after the four-year hiatus during which the members released solo work and completed their mandatory military service. In an interview on The Tonight Show Starring Jimmy Fallon, V said the song represents "who we are today after our solo journey".

== Music video ==
The music video for "2.0" was released on YouTube on April 1, 2026. An homage to Park Chan-wook's 2003 film Oldboy, the video features the group donning 1970s-era hairstyles and wearing suits and leather jackets. They encounter a group of gangsters in a corridor and instead of physically fighting them, BTS defeat the group with their "epic dance skills" and "collective aura". Later in the video, BTS emerge from an elevator in modern streetwear.

== Accolades ==
Awards and nominations for "Arirang"
Award show	Year	Category	Result	Ref.
Inkigayo	April 19,2026	Music show - First Place	Won	
MAMA Awards	2026	Best Music Video	Nominated	

== Charts ==
=== Weekly charts ===
Weekly chart performance
Chart (2026)	Peak position
Argentina Hot 100 (Billboard)	57
Australia (ARIA)	66
Bolivia (Billboard)	8
Brazil Hot 100 (Billboard)	13
Canada Hot 100 (Billboard)	41
Chile (Billboard)	17
China (TME Korean)	14
Colombia Hot 100 (Billboard)	47
Ecuador (Billboard)	21
France (SNEP)	136
Global 200 (Billboard)	8
Greece International (IFPI)	22
Hong Kong (Billboard)	12
India International (IMI)	4
Japan Combined Singles (Oricon)	14
Japan Hot 100 (Billboard)	10
Latvia Streaming (LaIPA)	20
Lithuania (AGATA)	33
Malaysia (IFPI)	8
Malaysia International (RIM)	3
Nicaragua Anglo Airplay (Monitor Latino)	5
Nigeria Bubbling Under Hot 100 (TurnTable)	8
Nigeria Airplay (TurnTable)	73
Panama Streaming (PRODUCE)	20
Peru Streaming (Promúsica)	4
Philippines Hot 100 (Billboard Philippines)	18
Poland (Polish Streaming Top 100)	86
Portugal (AFP)	32
Romania (Billboard)	25
Russia Streaming (TopHit)	76
Singapore (RIAS)	3
Slovakia Singles Digital (ČNS IFPI)	87
South Korea (Circle)	25
South Korea Hot 100 (Billboard)	20
Spain (Promusicae)	90
Taiwan (Billboard)	10
United Arab Emirates (IFPI)	11
UK Singles (Official Charts)	94
US Billboard Hot 100	50
Vietnam (IFPI)	16

=== Monthly charts ===
Monthly chart performance
Chart (2026)	Peak position
Brazil Streaming (Pro-Música Brasil)	25
Panama Streaming (PRODUCE)	37
South Korea (Circle)	32

== Certifications ==
Certifications for "2.0"
Region	Certification	Certified units/sales
Canada (Music Canada)	Gold	40,000^{‡}
^{‡} Sales+streaming figures based on certification alone.
