= Come Over (BTS song) =

Promotional single by BTS

from the album Arirang (Deluxe)
- Language: English; Korean
- Released: June 12, 2026
- Studio: Cirkut City (Los Angeles); Conway Recording (Hollywood); Dogg Bounce (Seoul)
- Genre: Pop
- Length: 2:58
- Label: BigHit
- Songwriters: Suga; Henry Walter; Joshua Coleman; Jacob Kasher Hindlin; Gregory Aldae Hein; RM; J-Hope; El Capitxn
- Producers: Cirkut; Ammo; Suga

Lyric video
- "Come Over" on YouTube

"Come Over" is a song by South Korean boy band BTS. It was written by Suga, Cirkut, Ammo, Jacob Kasher Hindlin, Aldae, RM, J-Hope and El Capitxn, with the first three handling the production. The song first appeared as a bonus track on the deluxe vinyl of their 2026 studio album, Arirang, released by BigHit Music. It was released on streaming on June 12, 2026, as part of the band's 13th anniversary the next day.

== Background and release ==
On January 4, 2026, BigHit Music announced BTS's comeback after a four-year hiatus during which they completed their mandatory military service and released solo work. The title of the album, Arirang, was revealed on January 15, referencing the Korean folk song of the same name. Upon release, the album was available as a standard edition of 14 songs.

On April 1, 2026, BTS announced on a live stream that the deluxe vinyl contained a hidden track produced by BTS member Suga. The title was revealed as "Come Over" when the deluxe vinyl released on April 3, 2026. On June 1, 2026, BigHit Music announced that the song would come to streaming services on June 12, 2026, to celebrate the 13th anniversary of BTS’s debut.

== Critical reception ==
Professional ratings
Review scores
Source	Rating
IZM	2/5 stars

Lee Jae-hun of IZM rated the song 2 out of 5 stars. He wrote that although it is dark and "solemn" unlike ordinary fan songs, it is not novel.

== Personnel ==
Credits are adapted from the liner notes of Arirang (Deluxe).

- BTS – vocals
  - Suga – vocals, songwriting, production, guitar, programming, synthesizer, drums, bass
  - RM – vocals, songwriting
  - J-Hope – vocals, songwriting
  - Jung Kook – vocals, background vocals
  - Jimin – vocals
  - Jin – vocals
  - V – vocals
- Cirkut – songwriting, production, programming, synthesizer, drums, bass, engineering
- Ammo – songwriting, production, synthesizer
- Gregory "Aldae" Hein – songwriting
- Jacob Kasher Hindlin – songwriting
- El Capitxn – songwriting
- Pdogg – engineering, arrangement
- Robert Palma – engineering
- Yang Ga – mix engineering
- Ghstloop – digital editing

== Accolades ==
Award and Nomination for "Come Over"
Award Show	Year	Category	Result	Ref.
The Fact Music Awards	2026	Best Music – Summer	Won	

== Charts ==
=== Weekly charts ===
Weekly chart performance
Chart (2026)	Peak position
Argentina Anglo Airplay (Monitor Latino)	16
Bolivia (Billboard)	4
Brazil Hot 100 (Billboard)	26
Canada Hot 100 (Billboard)	66
Chile (Billboard)	23
Global 200 (Billboard)	14
Greece International (IFPI)	86
Hong Kong (Billboard)	20
India International (IMI)	1
Japan Combined Singles (Oricon)	46
Japan Hot 100 (Billboard)	19
Latvia Airplay (LaIPA)	20
Malaysia (IFPI)	20
Malaysia International (RIM)	11
New Zealand Hot Singles (RMNZ)	6
Panama Streaming (PRODUCE)	22
Peru (Billboard)	5
Peru Streaming (Promúsica)	9
Philippines Hot 100 (Billboard Philippines)	54
Portugal (AFP)	129
Russia Streaming (TopHit)	86
Singapore (RIAS)	8
South Korea (Circle)	85
Taiwan (Billboard)	7
UK Singles (Official Charts)	52
US Billboard Hot 100	69
Vietnam Hot 100 (Billboard)	68

=== Monthly charts ===
Monthly chart performance
Chart (2026)	Position
Panama Streaming (PRODUCE)	170
South Korea (Circle)	146

== Release history ==
Release history and formats for "Come Over"
Region	Date	Format(s)	Label	Ref.
Various	June 12, 2026	Digital download; streaming	BigHit	
