= Normal (BTS song) =

2026 single by BTS

Single by BTS

from the album Arirang
- A-side: "Swim"
- Released: July 17, 2026
- Studio: Caballeros Studios; Dogg Bounce (Seoul); Patriot Studios (Denver)
- Genre: Pop; rock; R&B
- Length: 3:01
- Label: BigHit; Interscope; Capitol
- Songwriters: Sean Foreman; Livvi Franc; Ryan Tedder; Sean Cook; RM; J-Hope; Suga; Kirsten Alyssa Spencer; Derrick Milano; Pdogg
- Producers: Ryan Tedder; Sean Cook

BTS singles chronology
"Hooligan" (2026)	"Normal" (2026)

Music video
- "Normal" on YouTube

"Normal" (stylized in all caps) is a song by South Korean boy band BTS and the third single from their sixth Korean-language studio album Arirang (2026). It is produced by Ryan Tedder and Sean Cook, and written by Sean Foreman, Livvi Franc, Tedder, Cook, RM, J-Hope, Suga, Kirsten Alyssa Spencer, Derrick Milano and Pdogg. A rock and R&B-influenced pop song, "Normal" is about the group's life in the spotlight and how they balance their personal lives with elements of fame that have become normal for them.

== Background and release ==
On January 4, 2026, BigHit Music announced BTS's comeback after a four-year hiatus during which they completed their mandatory military service and released solo work. The title of the album, Arirang, was revealed on January 15, referencing the Korean folk song of the same name. On March 3, BTS revealed the album's track listing and production credits, with "Normal" revealed as the album's ninth track. The song was included as the B-side of the Target-exclusive tiny vinyl release for the album's lead single "Swim". A Korean version of "Normal" was included as a bonus track on a special-edition vinyl version of Arirang, released on June 12, 2026, to commemorate the group's 13 year anniversary.

On July 13, 2026, Billboard reported that "Normal" would be the second song from the album to be promoted to contemporary hit radio in the United States on July 27. The group published teasers for the song's single release in the July 13 and 14 issues of San Francisco Chronicle and New York Post, respectively, with the headline "BTS Seen in Bathroom Amid Mysterious Late-Night Gathering" accompanied by an image of the group standing at urinals in a bathroom. Following these teasers, Big Hit Music announced that the music video for "Normal" would be released on July 17, 2026 exclusively on Spotify, followed by a YouTube release on July 19. Alongside the music video release, the Korean version of "Normal" was also released for streaming and download the same day. A live performance clip at Sunhyewon, a historic hanok at Samcheong-dong, was released on July 22.

== Composition and lyrics ==
"Normal" was written by Sean Foreman, Livvi Franc, Ryan Tedder, Sean Cook, RM, J-Hope, Suga, Kirsten Alyssa Spencer, Derrick Milano and Pdogg, and produced by Tedder and Cook. It is a contemporary pop song influenced by "dreamy R&B in the vein of The Weeknd." It contains a "strong drum line" and the group's vocals have no reverb, allowing the "physical strain on their voices" to come through. Jon Caramanica of The New York Times said that the song is reminiscent of both late-career Rihanna singles, with "rock influence, but still [having] the structure of big mainstream pop songs", and the work of producer Mk.gee, with guitar lower in the mix which "sounds almost depressed".

Lyrically, "Normal" is about the clash between the group's public image as celebrities and their private lives, as the group "[expresses] ambivalence about the cost of celebrity", and having to face criticism while faking happiness. The first verse discusses the challenge of trying to authentically portray the group's feelings publicly, with the lyrics "Heavy is the head when you chasin' true / Will you color me red? Will you color me blue? / Two sides of a coin, and they both ain't true / Is it different for mе? Is it different for you?" The chorus then reflects on "how surreal it is to normalize A-list fame," which is not at all normal, with the lines "Kerosene, dopamine, chemical-induced / Fantasy and fame, yeah, the things we choose / Show me hate, show me love, make me bulletproof / Yeah, we call this shit normal." The chorus also represents their willingness to "embrace the intense, addictive rush of fame" while strengthening themselves against the need for survival in the public eye.

== Music video ==
A music video for "Normal", directed by Tanu Muino, premiered Spotify on July 17, 2026, before being released on YouTube two days later. The video depicts the members of BTS the day after a celebration in a "stately old mansion", showing both the previous night's activities and the "quiet moments the following morning." It captures their raw selves which are normally hidden behind the glamour of fame, with the members singing while soaked in water and lying down, exhausted, and depicts the members' true personalities, "observing them in their natural state." The video also show the members standing around urinals in a bathroom, which was shown in the viral teaser images prior to release, and posing and playing with various dogs. The music video broke Spotify's record for the most streamed K-pop music video in a single day on the platform.

== Track listing ==
4-inch vinyl

1. "Swim" – 2:39
2. "Normal" – 3:01

CD single – instrumental

1. "Normal" (Note: also labelled as "Normal" (explicit)) – 3:01
2. "Normal" (clean) – 3:04
3. "Normal" (instrumental) – 3:04

CD single – Korean version

1. "Normal" – 3:01
2. "Normal" (clean) – 3:04
3. "Normal" (Korean version) – 3:04
4. "Normal" (clean Korean version) – 3:04

Digital EP

1. "Normal" – 3:01
2. "Normal" (clean) – 3:04
3. "Normal" (Korean version) – 3:04
4. "Normal" (clean Korean version) – 3:04
5. "Normal" (instrumental) – 3:04

== Credits and personnel ==
Credits adapted from Apple Music.

- BTS – vocals
  - Jung Kook – background vocals
  - RM – songwriting
  - J-Hope – songwriting
  - Suga – songwriting
- Ryan Tedder – songwriting, production, programming, keyboards, drums, recording engineering, vocal production
- Sean Cook – songwriting, production, programming, keyboards, guitar, drums, recording engineering, vocal production
- Sean Foreman – songwriting
- Livvi Franc – songwriting
- Kirsten Alyssa Spencer – songwriting
- Derrick Milano – songwriting
- Pdogg – songwriting, vocal arrangement, recording engineering
- Serban Ghenea – mixing
- Bryce Bordone – mixing assistance
- Mike Bozzi – mastering

== Charts ==
=== Weekly charts ===
Weekly chart performance
Chart (2026)	Peak position
Argentina Hot 100 (Billboard)	41
Austria (Ö3 Austria Top 40)	51
Bolivia (Billboard)	3
Brazil Hot 100 (Billboard)	12
Canada Hot 100 (Billboard)	33
Chile (Billboard)	9
Colombia Hot 100 (Billboard)	27
Costa Rica Anglo Airplay (Monitor Latino)	12
Ecuador (Billboard)	19
France (SNEP)	86
Germany (GfK)	47
Global 200 (Billboard)	4
Greece International (IFPI)	20
Hong Kong (Billboard)	8
India International (IMI)	3
Japan Hot 100 (Billboard)	49
Japan Digital Singles (Oricon)	9
Japan Streaming (Oricon)	50
Kazakhstan Airplay (TopHit)	44
Latvia Streaming (LaIPA)	16
Lithuania (AGATA)	31
Malaysia (IFPI)	15
Malaysia International (RIM)	5
Mexico (Billboard)	8
Middle East and North Africa (IFPI)	18
Panama Streaming (PRODUCE)	16
Paraguay Anglo Airplay (Monitor Latino)	12
Peru (Billboard)	3
Peru Streaming (Promúsica)	5
Philippines Hot 100 (Billboard Philippines)	8
Poland (Polish Streaming Top 100)	67
Portugal (AFP)	23
Romania (Billboard)	20
Russia Streaming (TopHit)	72
Singapore (RIAS)	2
Slovakia Singles Digital (ČNS IFPI)	71
South Korea (Circle)	95
Spain (Promusicae)	76
Taiwan (Billboard)	3
Thailand (Billboard)	15
United Arab Emirates (IFPI)	14
UK Singles (Official Charts)	36
US Billboard Hot 100	33
US Pop Airplay (Billboard)	40
Vietnam (IFPI)	19

=== Monthly charts ===
Monthly chart performance
Chart (2026)	Peak position
Kazakhstan Airplay (TopHit)	42
Panama Streaming (PRODUCE)	44

== Release history ==
Release history and formats for "Normal"
Region	Date	Format(s)	Version	Label	Ref.
United States	April 3, 2026	Tiny vinyl (4-inch)	Original	BigHit	
Various	July 17, 2026	Digital download; streaming	Original; Korean; instrumental	BigHit	
United States	July 17, 2026	CD single	Original; instrumental	BigHit	
United States	July 17, 2026	CD single	Original; Korean	BigHit	
United States	July 27, 2026	Contemporary hit radio	Original	Interscope; Capitol	
Italy	August 14, 2026	Radio airplay	Original	EMI	
