= Fya =

2026 song by BTS

Song by BTS

from the album Arirang
- Released: March 20, 2026
- Recorded: July–November 2025
- Genre: Jersey club
- Length: 3:00
- Label: BigHit
- Songwriters: Barrington Hendricks; Gregory Hein; Kurtis Wells; Thomas Pentz; Kim Nam-joon; Jeon Jung-kook; Richard Mears IV; Harley Streten; Min Yoon-gi
- Producers: Diplo; Flume; Nitti Gritti

"Fya" (stylized in all caps, pronounced /ˈfaɪə/ FY-uh) is a song by South Korean boy band BTS from their tenth studio album, Arirang (2026). It was produced by Diplo, Flume and Nitti Gritti.

== Composition ==
"Fya" is a Jersey club song, with "revving synths and distorted beats". The music has been described as evoking the "sound of machinery in motion" and the sensation of a "chase scene through a bondage club, full of thrums and thwacks."

== Critical reception ==
The song received generally positive reviews. AllMusic's Neil Z. Yeung described it as "impeccably-produced" and "a high intensity dancefloor assault". Nicole Fell of The Hollywood Reporter and Maria Letícia L. Gomes of Clash both considered it a standout of Arirang, with the former commenting that "Sonically speaking, it's completely out of left field for the group, in the best way possible. The lyrics are catchy ass [sic] hell too". Rhian Daly of NME stated the song "revs up into something urgent and uplifting." Pitchfork's Joshua Minsoo Kim criticized the song, describing it as "noxiously self-serious, its half-energetic verve deadened by its Auto-Tune slurry."

== Charts ==
=== Weekly charts ===
Weekly chart performance
Chart (2026)	Peak position
Argentina Hot 100 (Billboard)	54
Australia (ARIA)	48
Austria (Ö3 Austria Top 40)	39
Bolivia (Billboard)	6
Brazil Hot 100 (Billboard)	9
Canada Hot 100 (Billboard)	34
Chile (Billboard)	9
China (TME Korean)	5
Colombia Hot 100 (Billboard)	36
Czech Republic Singles Digital (ČNS IFPI)	39
Ecuador (Billboard)	14
Ecuador Streaming (Promúsica)	18
El Salvador Anglo Airplay (Monitor Latino)	9
France (SNEP)	83
Germany (GfK)	37
Global 200 (Billboard)	4
Greece International (IFPI)	10
Hong Kong (Billboard)	10
India International (IMI)	5
Ireland (IRMA)	64
Japan Combined Singles (Oricon)	46
Japan Hot 100 (Billboard)	39
Latvia Streaming (LaIPA)	5
Malaysia (Billboard)	12
Malaysia International (RIM)	6
Mexico (Billboard)	20
Middle East and North Africa (IFPI)	16
Netherlands (Single Top 100)	74
New Zealand (Recorded Music NZ)	39
Panama Streaming (PRODUCE)	14
Peru Streaming (Promúsica)	5
Philippines Hot 100 (Billboard Philippines)	15
Poland (Polish Streaming Top 100)	40
Portugal (AFP)	20
Romania (Billboard)	14
Russia Streaming (TopHit)	74
Singapore (RIAS)	6
Slovakia Singles Digital (ČNS IFPI)	45
South Korea (Circle)	20
South Korea Hot 100 (Billboard)	9
Spain (Promusicae)	73
Switzerland (Schweizer Hitparade)	38
Taiwan (Billboard)	5
United Arab Emirates (IFPI)	13
UK Singles (Official Charts)	39
US Billboard Hot 100	36
Vietnam (IFPI)	9

=== Monthly charts ===
Monthly chart performance
Chart (2026)	Peak position
Brazil Streaming (Pro-Música Brasil)	47
Panama Streaming (PRODUCE)	58
Russia Streaming (TopHit)	82
South Korea (Circle)	74
