= J-Hope discography =

- J-Hope on November 22, 2024
- Studio albums: 1
- EPs: 1
- Mixtapes: 1
- Singles: 13
- Music videos: 13

South Korean rapper J-Hope has released one studio album, one extended play, one mixtape, eleven singles as lead artist, and two singles as a featured artist. As a member of the boy band BTS since 2013, he has contributed to both group and solo projects. J-Hope released his first solo mixtape Hope World in 2018, and his first studio album, Jack in the Box, in 2022. He has collaborated with artists such as Jo Kwon, Becky G, Crush, J. Cole, and Miguel, among others.

== Studio albums ==
List of studio albums with selected details, showing chart positions, sales, and certifications
Title	Details	Peak chart positions										Sales	Certifications
Title	Details	KOR	AUS	CAN	FIN	FRA	GER	JPN Hot	NZ	UK	US	Sales	Certifications
Jack in the Box	Released: July 15, 2022; Label: Big Hit; Formats: Digital download, streaming	2	27	43	3	7	29	2	30	67	6	KOR: 1,123,777; JPN: 30,407; US: 72,000	KMCA: Platinum; KMCA: 2× Platinum

== Extended plays ==
List of extended plays with selected details, showing chart positions, sales, and certifications
Title	Details	Peak chart positions									Sales	Certifications
Title	Details	KOR	AUS	FIN	FRA	GER	JPN Hot	NZ	UK	US	Sales	Certifications
Hope on the Street Vol. 1	Released: March 29, 2024; Label: Big Hit; Formats: Digital download, streaming	2	62	38	6	10	2	29	38	5	KOR: 505,592; JPN: 33,371; US: 44,000	KMCA: Platinum

== Mixtapes ==
List of mixtapes, with selected details, chart positions, and sales
Title	Details	Peak chart positions										Sales
Title	Details	AUS	CAN	FRA	JPN Hot	NLD	NOR	NZ	SWE	US	US World	Sales
Hope World	Released: March 2, 2018; Label: Big Hit; Formats: Digital download, streaming	13	35	160	13	34	14	23	30	38	1	US: 21,000

== Singles ==
=== As lead artist ===
List of singles, with selected chart positions, showing year released, and album name
Title	Year	Peak chart positions										Sales	Album
Title	Year	KOR	CAN	HUN	IRE	JPN Hot	NZ Hot	UK	US	US World	WW	Sales	Album
"Daydream" (백일몽)	2018	—	—	—	—	80	— (Note: "Daydream" peaked at number seven on the NZ Heatseeker Singles Chart.)	—	—	1	—	US: 5,000	Hope World
"Airplane"	2018	—	—	—	—	—	—	—	—	5	—	—N/a	Hope World
"Chicken Noodle Soup" (featuring Becky G)	2019	—	55	4	80	—	13	82	81	1	—	US: 11,000	Non-album single
"More"	2022	98	75	—	75	—	6	70	82	1	15	JPN: 1,849 (Dig.); US: 12,000; WW: 26,000	Jack in the Box
"Arson" (방화)	2022	149	— (Note: "Arson" did not enter the Canadian Hot 100, but peaked at number 27 on the Canadian Digital Song Sales chart.)	—	—	—	9	—	96	1	38	—N/a	Jack in the Box
"On the Street" (solo or with J. Cole)	2023	36	58	2	57	75	4	37	60	2	16	JPN: 9,622 (Dig.)	Hope on the Street Vol. 1
"Neuron" (with Gaeko and Yoon Mi-rae)	2024	140	—	—	—	—	16	64	—	1	84	JPN: 2,581 (Dig.)	Hope on the Street Vol. 1
"LV Bag" (with Don Toliver and Speedy featuring Pharrell Williams)	2025	— (Note: "LV Bag" did not enter the Circle Digital Chart, but peaked at number 13 on the component Download Chart.)	95	—	—	—	8	93	83	—	48	JPN: 1,552 (Dig.)	Non-album singles
"Sweet Dreams" (featuring Miguel)	2025	49	79	—	—	84	8	42	66	—	16	JPN: 5,210 (Dig.)	Non-album singles
"Mona Lisa"	2025	84	69	—	—	94	8	56	65	—	14	JPN: 4,010 (Dig.)	Non-album singles
"Killin' It Girl" (featuring GloRilla)	2025	121	54	—	—	52	5	30	40	—	3	JPN: 4,104 (Dig.); WW: 43,000	Non-album singles
"—" denotes releases that did not chart or were not released in that region.

=== As featured artist ===
List of singles, with selected chart positions, showing year released, and album name
Title	Year	Peak chart positions								Sales	Album
Title	Year	KOR	CAN	HUN	JPN Dig.	NZ Hot	US	US World	WW	Sales	Album
"Animal" (Radio Edit) (Jo Kwon featuring J-Hope)	2012	36	—	—	—	—	—	—	—	KOR: 166,354	I'm Da One
"Rush Hour" (Crush featuring J-Hope)	2022	4	—	17	47	17	—	1	102	JPN: 1,509 (Dig.)	Non-album singles
"Spaghetti" (Le Sserafim featuring J-Hope)	2025	5	49	—	—	6	50	1	6	—N/a	Spaghetti
"—" denotes releases that did not chart or were not released in that region.

== Other charted songs ==
List of other charted songs, with selected chart positions, showing year released, and album name
Title	Year	Peak chart positions							Sales	Album
Title	Year	KOR	CAN Dig.	HUN	JPN Dig.	NZ Hot	UK Dig.	US World	Sales	Album
"Intro: Boy Meets Evil" (Note: credited to BTS but is a solo performed by J-Hope)	2016	40	—	—	—	—	—	9	KOR: 54,404	Wings
"Mama"	2016	37	—	—	—	—	—	13	KOR: 83,332	Wings
"Base Line"	2018	—	—	—	—	—	—	8	—N/a	Hope World
"Hangsang" (featuring Supreme Boi)	2018	—	—	—	—	—	—	11	—N/a	Hope World
"Hope World"	2018	—	—	—	—	—	—	5	—N/a	Hope World
"P.O.P (Piece of Peace) pt.1"	2018	—	—	—	—	—	—	12	—N/a	Hope World
"Trivia: Just Dance"	2018	42	—	12	—	—	61	7	US: 10,000	Love Yourself: Answer
"Intro"	2022	— (Note: "Intro" did not enter the Circle Digital Chart, but peaked at number 49 on the component Download Chart.)	—	—	—	—	—	—	—N/a	Jack in the Box
"Pandora's Box"	2022	— (Note: "Pandora's Box" did not enter the Circle Digital Chart, but peaked at number 37 on the component Download Chart.)	—	—	—	—	—	4	—N/a	Jack in the Box
"Stop" (세상에 나쁜 사람은 없다)	2022	— (Note: "Stop" did not enter the Circle Digital Chart, but peaked at number 36 on the component Download Chart.)	—	—	—	—	—	6	—N/a	Jack in the Box
"= (Equal Sign)"	2022	— (Note: "= (Equal Sign)" did not enter the Circle Digital Chart, but peaked at number 33 on the component Download Chart.)	42	—	—	—	—	2	—N/a	Jack in the Box
"Music Box: Reflection"	2022	— (Note: "Music Box: Reflection" did not enter the Circle Digital Chart, but peaked at number 42 on the component Download Chart.)	—	—	—	—	—	—	—N/a	Jack in the Box
"What If..."	2022	— (Note: "What If..." did not enter the Circle Digital Chart, but peaked at number 39 on the component Download Chart.)	49	—	—	—	—	6	—N/a	Jack in the Box
"Safety Zone"	2022	— (Note: "Safety Zone" did not enter the Circle Digital Chart, but peaked at number 35 on the component Download Chart.)	—	—	—	—	—	3	—N/a	Jack in the Box
"Future"	2022	— (Note: "Future" did not enter the Circle Digital Chart, but peaked at number 38 on the component Download Chart.)	50	—	—	—	—	5	—N/a	Jack in the Box
"Huh?!" (Agust D featuring J-Hope)	2023	— (Note: "Huh?!" did not enter the Circle Digital Chart, but peaked at number 19 on the component Download Chart.)	28	—	—	—	—	3	—N/a	D-Day
"I Wonder..." (with Jungkook)	2024	— (Note: "I Wonder..." did not enter the Circle Digital Chart, but peaked at number 10 on the component Download Chart.)	—	—	15	31	—	2	JPN: 2,581	Hope on the Street Vol. 1
"Lock / Unlock" (with Benny Blanco and Nile Rodgers)	2024	— (Note: "Lock / Unlock" did not enter the Circle Digital Chart, but peaked at number 16 on the component Download Chart.)	—	—	—	—	—	—	—N/a	Hope on the Street Vol. 1
"I Don't Know" (with Huh Yunjin)	2024	— (Note: "I Don't Know" did not enter the Circle Digital Chart, but peaked at number 14 on the component Download Chart.)	—	—	—	—	—	4	—N/a	Hope on the Street Vol. 1
"What If..." (dance mix) (with Jinbo the SuperFreak)	2024	— (Note: "What If..." (dance mix) did not enter the Circle Digital Chart, but peaked at number 20 on the component Download Chart.)	—	—	—	—	—	5	—N/a	Hope on the Street Vol. 1
"Sweet Dreams" (FnZ remix) (featuring Miguel)	2025	— (Note: "Sweet Dreams" (FnZ remix) did not enter the Circle Digital Chart, but peaked at number 124 on the component Download Chart.)	—	—	—	—	—	—	—N/a	Non-album song
"Killin' It Girl" (solo version)	2025	— (Note: "Killin' It Girl" (solo version) did not enter the Circle Digital Chart, but peaked at number 10 on the component Download Chart.)	—	—	—	—	—	—	JPN: 968	Killin' It Girl (Remixes)
"Killin' It Girl" (instrumental) (featuring GloRilla)	2025	— (Note: "Killin' It Girl" (instrumental) did not enter the Circle Digital Chart, but peaked at number 179 on the component Download Chart.)	—	—	—	—	—	—	—N/a	Killin' It Girl (Remixes)
"Killin' It Girl" (clean version) (featuring GloRilla)	2025	— (Note: "Killin' It Girl" (clean version) did not enter the Circle Digital Chart, but peaked at number 136 on the component Download Chart.)	—	—	—	—	—	—	—N/a	Killin' It Girl (Remixes)
"Killin' It Girl" (band remix) (featuring GloRilla)	2025	— (Note: "Killin' It Girl" (band remix) did not enter the Circle Digital Chart, but peaked at number 181 on the component Download Chart.)	—	—	—	—	—	—	—N/a	Killin' It Girl (Remixes)
"—" denotes releases that did not chart or were not released in that region.

=== Other songs ===
List of non-single songs, showing year released and other performing artists
Title	Year	Other artist(s)	Album	Ref.
"1 Verse"	2015	None	Non-album singles	
"Ddaeng" (땡)	2018	RM, Suga	Non-album singles	
"Blue Side"	2021	None	Non-album singles	

== Music videos ==
Name of music video, year released, other credited artist(s), director, and additional notes
Title	Year	Other performer(s) credited	Director(s)	Description	Ref.
"Boy Meets Evil"	2016	none	GDW	Comeback trailer for BTS' 2016 album Wings	
"Daydream"	2018	none	Yong-seok Choi (Lumpens)		
"Airplane"	2018	none	GDW		
"Chicken Noodle Soup"	2019	Becky G	Yong-Seok Choi (Lumpens)		
"Outro: Ego"	2020	none	YooJeong Ko	Comeback trailer for BTS' 2020 album Map of the Soul: 7	
"More"	2022	none	Lee Suho		
"Arson"	2022	none	Lee Suho		
"Rush Hour"	2022	Crush	Bangjaeyeob	Crush performs the song while walking down a crowded street while surrounded by "yellow taxi cars, graffiti painted walls, scaffold-littered side streets and abandoned bus stops". He is joined by a large group of dancers who "perform hip-hop dance moves". J-Hope arrives and dances with them while rapping his verse then he and Crush dance together.	
"On the Street"	2023	J. Cole	Yong-seok Choi (Lumpens)	J-Hope walks and dances through the streets of New York City while performing the song. Interspersed with his scenes are shots of J. Cole on the rooftop of a city building. J-Hope dances freestyle in the Bowery subway station while Cole raps his verses. J-Hope joins Cole on the rooftop at the end.	
"Neuron"	2024	Gaeko and Yoon Mi-rae	Jan Qui	Presented as an "Official Motion Picture" to accompany the song. A young boy observes the streets of the city around him and its various inhabitants through the lens of his camera and while riding around in a taxi. The featured montage of scenes creates a moving collage of the city landscape. None of the artists appear in the video, but are heard performing the song in its audio.	
"Sweet Dreams"	2025	Miguel			
"Mona Lisa"	2025	none	Yong-seok Choi (Lumpens)	J-Hope performs the song while moving through a set reminiscent of an art museum, accompanied by a troupe of dancers.	
"Killin' It Girl "	2025	GloRilla	Cody Critcheloe	Filmed in Thailand, the video switches between color and black and white. J-Hope performs the song while lying in the middle of a street, then together with dancers, and in a car while drinking champagne. GloRilla raps her verse on a separate set from J-Hope. The two do not meet or perform together, but a black cat appears in both locales, serving as a connection between them.	

- J-Hope also appeared in the 2016 short film BTS Wings Short Film #6 MAMA directed by Yong-seok Choi of Lumpens and released in September of that year in promotion of BTS' fourth studio album Wings.
