= Hope on the Stage Tour =

2025 concert tour by J-Hope

- Tour by J-Hope
- Los Angeles promotional poster
- Location: North America; Asia
- Associated album: Hope World; Jack in the Box; Hope on the Street Vol. 1
- Start date: February 28, 2025
- End date: June 14, 2025
- No. of shows: 33
- Attendance: 504,080
- Box office: $84.7 million

Hope on the Stage Tour was the first worldwide concert tour by South Korean rapper J-Hope, in support of his debut studio album, Jack in the Box, and extended play Hope on the Street Vol. 1. The tour began on February 28, 2025, in Seoul, and ended on June 14, 2025, in Goyang.

== Background and development ==
Prior to enlisting in April 2023, J-Hope released Jack in the Box in July 2022, the first of BTS's members to release a solo album. While serving his military enlistment, he released the EP Hope on the Street Vol. 1, along with a six-part documentary series. J-hope completed his military service in October 2024.

On January 9, 2025, j-hope announced his first solo tour, Hope on the Stage. On the same day, he also hinted that "new music is on the way" in March 2025. The following day, BigHit Music officially announced that j-hope would embark on his first solo world tour, making him the second member of BTS to hold a solo tour. The tour is scheduled to begin with three shows at the KSPO Dome in Seoul from February 28 to March 2, then visit the United States, Mexico, Asia, and end in Japan with its final show on June 1.

The tour spans major cities in Asia and North America, beginning with three consecutive shows at Seoul's KSPO Dome from February 28 to March 2, which marks j-hope's first solo concert in his home country. From there, j-hope heads to the United States, performing 10 shows across the country, with two shows in Mexico in between. He will become the first BTS member to headline a solo stadium show with his two-night appearances at BMO Stadium in Los Angeles. He then heads back to Asia, performing in the Philippines, Japan, Singapore, Indonesia, Thailand, Macau, and Taiwan, before returning to South Korea to conclude the tour at Goyang Stadium on June 13 (BTS's 12th debut anniversary) and 14.

== Ticketing ==
Interpark is the exclusive retailer for the Seoul shows, with three types of tickets offered: general, general plus meet-and-greet, and VIP. Live streaming is available for all three concerts, with one delayed streaming option and no VOD service; tickets went on sale on February 14.

Ticketmaster is the retailer for the North America shows, with presale offered to those with BTS's global fan club membership on January 22 and general public sale on January 23, with the exception of the Los Angeles shows due to the series of wildfires in Southern California. On February 5, it was announced that the Los Angeles tickets will go on presale on February 11 with the general public sale on February 12. Additional seats with limited viewing went on sale on February 12 for Barclays Center, Allstate Arena, Frost Bank Center, and Oakland Arena shows; fan club membership is not required.

BTS' global fan club members may enter an advance ticket raffle for the Japan shows. They also have presale access on February 19 for stops in Pasay (Manila), Singapore, Jakarta, and Pak Kret (Bangkok). For Manila, SM Tickets is the retailer, with Smart subscribers presale starting on February 20 and general public sale starting on February 21. For Singapore and Bangkok, Ticketmaster SG and Thaiticketmajor are the retailers, respectively, with Live Nation members presale starting on February 20 and general public sale starting on February 21. For Jakarta, tiket.com is the retailer with general public presale starting on February 20.

== Set list ==
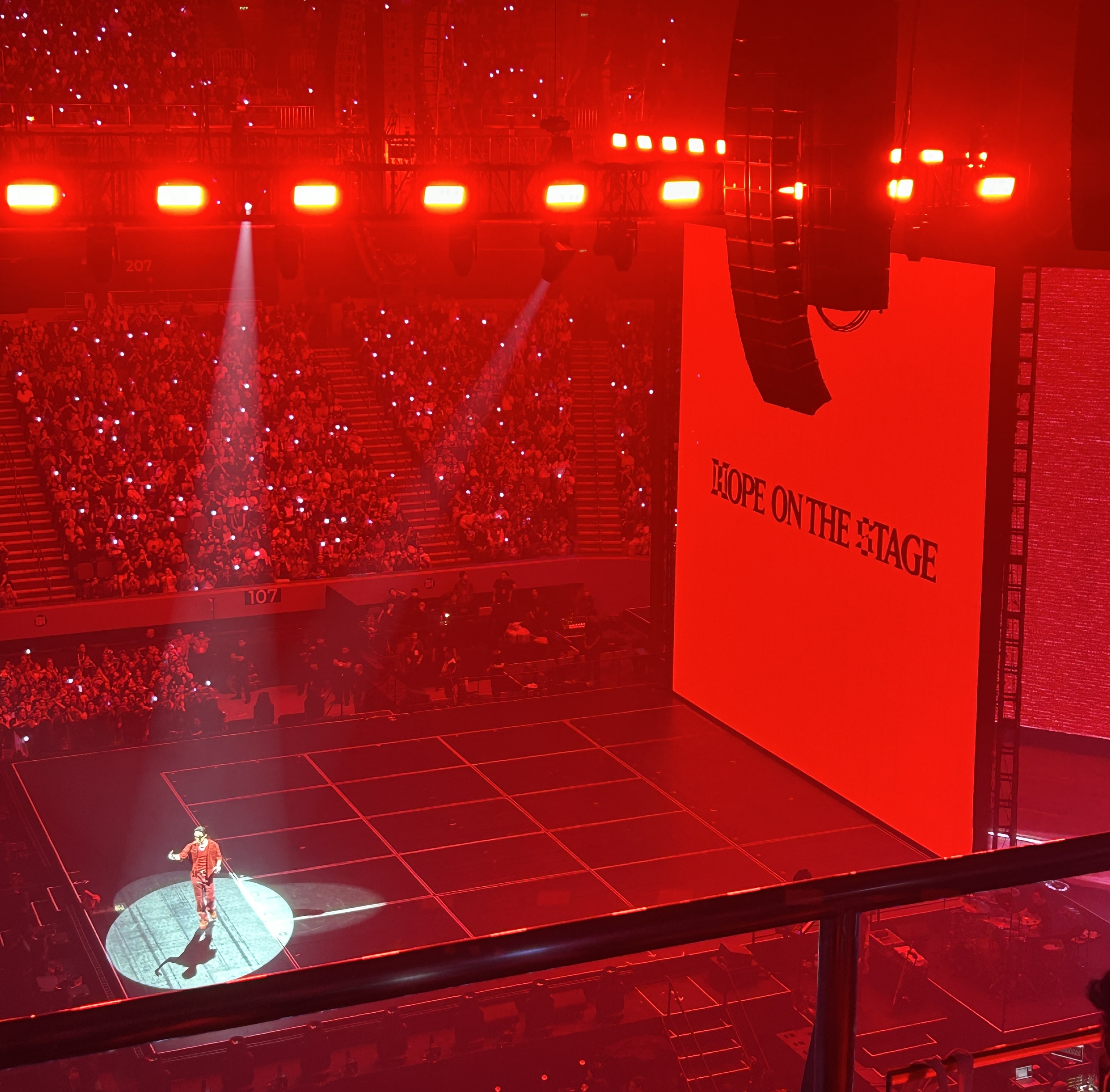
J-Hope during his Hope on the Stage concert in Manila on April 12, 2025.

The set is split into five sections, each with its own mood and theme: Ambition, Dream, Expectations, Fantasy, and Wish.

Ambition

1. "What If..."
2. "Pandora's Box"
3. "방화" (Arson)
4. "Stop" (세상에 나쁜 사람은 없다)
5. "More"

Dream

6. "On the Street"
7. "Lock / Unlock"
8. "I Don't Know"
9. "I Wonder..."
10. "Trivia: Just Dance"
11. "Sweet Dreams"
12. "Mona Lisa"

Expectations

13. "1 Verse"
14. "Base Line"
15. "항상" (Hangsang)
16. "Airplane"
17. "Airplane Pt. 2"
18. "Mic Drop"
19. "뱁새" (Silver Spoon)
20. "Dis-ease" (병)

Fantasy

21. "Outro: Ego"
22. "Daydream" (백일몽)
23. "Chicken Noodle Soup"
24. "Hope World"

Wish/Encore

25. "=" (Equal Sign)
26. "Future"
27. "Neuron"

== Tour dates ==
Key
‡	Indicates performances streamed simultaneously on Weverse Concerts

Concert dates
Date	City	Country	Venue	Attendance	Revenue
February 28, 2025 ‡	Seoul	South Korea	KSPO Dome	504,000	$79,900,000
March 1, 2025 ‡	Seoul	South Korea	KSPO Dome	504,000	$79,900,000
March 2, 2025 ‡	Seoul	South Korea	KSPO Dome	504,000	$79,900,000
March 13, 2025	Brooklyn	United States	Barclays Center	504,000	$79,900,000
March 14, 2025	Brooklyn	United States	Barclays Center	504,000	$79,900,000
March 17, 2025	Rosemont (Note: Labeled as Chicago in promotional material.)	United States	Allstate Arena	504,000	$79,900,000
March 18, 2025	Rosemont	United States	Allstate Arena	504,000	$79,900,000
March 22, 2025	Mexico City	Mexico	Palacio De Los Deportes	504,000	$79,900,000
March 23, 2025	Mexico City	Mexico	Palacio De Los Deportes	504,000	$79,900,000
March 26, 2025	San Antonio	United States	Frost Bank Center	504,000	$79,900,000
March 27, 2025	San Antonio	United States	Frost Bank Center	504,000	$79,900,000
March 31, 2025	Oakland	United States	Oakland Arena	504,000	$79,900,000
April 1, 2025	Oakland	United States	Oakland Arena	504,000	$79,900,000
April 4, 2025	Los Angeles	United States	BMO Stadium	504,000	$79,900,000
April 6, 2025	Los Angeles	United States	BMO Stadium	504,000	$79,900,000
April 12, 2025	Pasay (Note: Labeled as Manila in promotional material.)	Philippines	SM Mall of Asia Arena	504,000	$79,900,000
April 13, 2025	Pasay	Philippines	SM Mall of Asia Arena	504,000	$79,900,000
April 19, 2025	Saitama	Japan	Saitama Super Arena	504,000	$79,900,000
April 20, 2025	Saitama	Japan	Saitama Super Arena	504,000	$79,900,000
April 26, 2025	Singapore		Singapore Indoor Stadium	504,000	$79,900,000
April 27, 2025	Singapore		Singapore Indoor Stadium	504,000	$79,900,000
May 3, 2025	Jakarta	Indonesia	Indonesia Arena	504,000	$79,900,000
May 4, 2025	Jakarta	Indonesia	Indonesia Arena	504,000	$79,900,000
May 10, 2025	Pak Kret (Note: Labeled as Bangkok in promotional material.)	Thailand	Impact Arena	504,000	$79,900,000
May 11, 2025	Pak Kret	Thailand	Impact Arena	504,000	$79,900,000
May 17, 2025	Macau		Galaxy Arena	504,000	$79,900,000
May 18, 2025	Macau		Galaxy Arena	504,000	$79,900,000
May 24, 2025	Taoyuan (Note: Labeled as Taipei in promotional material.)	Taiwan	NTSU Arena	504,000	$79,900,000
May 25, 2025	Taoyuan	Taiwan	NTSU Arena	504,000	$79,900,000
May 31, 2025	Osaka	Japan	Kyocera Dome Osaka	504,000	$79,900,000
June 1, 2025	Osaka	Japan	Kyocera Dome Osaka	504,000	$79,900,000
June 13, 2025 ‡	Goyang	South Korea	Goyang Stadium	504,000	$79,900,000
June 14, 2025 ‡	Goyang	South Korea	Goyang Stadium	504,000	$79,900,000
Total				504,000	$79,900,000
