= Mona Lisa (J-Hope song) =

"MONA LISA"

Single by J-Hope
- Released: March 21, 2025
- Genre: Hip-hop; R&B
- Length: 2:17 (radio edit)
- Label: Big Hit
- Songwriters: Blake Slatkin; J-Hope; Magnus August Høiberg; Marcus Lomax; Nija Aisha-Alayja Charles; Pdogg; Zain Siddiqui
- Producers: Blake Slatkin; Cashmere Cat; MISOGI

J-Hope singles chronology
"Sweet Dreams" (2025)	"MONA LISA" (2025)	"Killin' It Girl" (2025)

Music video
- "Mona Lisa" on YouTube

"MONA LISA" is a song by South Korean rapper J-Hope of BTS. The song was previewed during two Hope on the Stage Tour stops at the Barclays Center in Brooklyn and was officially released with a music video on March 21, 2025. The song was produced by Blake Slatkin, Cashmere Cat, and Misogi.

== Background ==
On March 13 and 14, J-Hope began the North American leg of his Hope on the Stage Tour with two shows at the Barclays Center in Brooklyn. There, J-Hope performed "Mona Lisa" and told the attending audience that "Mona Lisa" was his way of "expressing love" to the Army, or fans of BTS. Shortly after, the single's release date, March 21, was announced on Weverse. On March 19, a 30-second teaser of the song was released.

== Accolades ==
Music program awards
Program	Date	Ref.
M Countdown	April 10, 2025	
M Countdown	April 17, 2025	

Year-end awards
Awards	Category	Result	Ref.
2026 iHeartRadio Music Awards	Favorite TikTok Dance	Won	
2025 MAMA Awards	Best Dance Performance – Male Solo	Nominated	
2025 MAMA Awards	Song of the Year	Nominated	

== Track listing ==
- Digital download and streaming
1. "Mona Lisa" – 2:17
- Digital download and streaming – remixes
1. "Mona Lisa" – 2:17
2. "Mona Lisa" (band remix) – 2:16
3. "Mona Lisa" (afropop remix) – 2:27
- Digital download and streaming – remix so fine
1. "Mona Lisa" – 2:17
2. "Mona Lisa" (UK garage remix) – 2:19
3. "Mona Lisa" (afro house remix) – 3:05
4. "Mona Lisa" (sped up) – 1:59
5. "Mona Lisa" (slowed down) – 2:40

== Charts ==
Chart performance for "Mona Lisa"
Chart (2025–2026)	Peak position
Bolivia Anglo Airplay (Monitor Latino)	7
Brazil Hot 100 (Billboard)	37
Canada Hot 100 (Billboard)	69
Central America Anglo Airplay (Monitor Latino)	13
Chile Anglo Airplay (Monitor Latino)	9
Costa Rica Anglo Airplay (Monitor Latino)	10
Global 200 (Billboard)	14
Honduras Anglo Airplay (Monitor Latino)	8
India International (IMI)	2
Japan (Japan Hot 100)	94
Japan Digital (Oricon)	9
New Zealand Hot Singles (RMNZ)	8
Panama Anglo Airplay (Monitor Latino)	7
Paraguay Anglo Airplay (Monitor Latino)	6
Philippines (Philippines Hot 100)	38
Russia Streaming (TopHit)	73
Singapore (RIAS)	22
South Korea (Circle)	84
UK Singles (Official Charts)	56
US Billboard Hot 100	65

== Release history ==
"Sweet Dreams" release history
Region	Date	Format	Version	Label	Ref.
Various	March 21, 2025	Digital download; streaming	Original	Big Hit	
Various	March 25, 2025	Digital download; streaming	Remixes	Big Hit	
Various	April 1, 2025	Digital download; streaming	Remix so fine	Big Hit	
