= LV Bag =

Single by Don Toliver, Speedy, and J-Hope featuring Pharrell Williams
- Released: February 21, 2025
- Studio: 2 Rue du Pont-Neuf, Paris
- Length: 3:02
- Label: Cactus Jack; Atlantic
- Songwriters: Caleb Toliver; Jung Ho-seok; Pharrell Williams
- Producer: Williams

Don Toliver singles chronology
"No Pole" (2025)	"LV Bag" (2025)	"Lose My Mind" (2025)

J-Hope singles chronology
"Neuron" (2024)	"LV Bag" (2025)	"Sweet Dreams" (2025)

Pharrell Williams singles chronology
"Good Mornin'" (2024)	"LV Bag" (2025)

"LV Bag" is a song by American rapper and singer Don Toliver with his Louis Vuitton bag that he named "Speedy" and credited as an artist on the song and South Korean rapper J-Hope featuring American musician Pharrell Williams. It was released as a single through Cactus Jack and Atlantic Records on February 21, 2025. The three artists with the exception of Speedy wrote the song together, while Williams also produced it.

== Background and promotion ==
On January 21, 2025, the song was played at Paris Fashion Week as Pharrell Williams and Japanese fashion designer Nigo walked through the runway, in which its title was revealed. Toliver announced the release date of the song along with a trailer video on February 17, 2025.

== Charts ==
Chart performance for "LV Bag"
Chart (2025)	Peak position
Canada (Canadian Hot 100)	95
Global 200 (Billboard)	48
India International (IMI)	7
Japan Hot Overseas (Billboard Japan)	8
New Zealand Hot Singles (RMNZ)	8
South Korea Download (Circle)	13
UK Singles (OCC)	93
US Billboard Hot 100	83
US Hot R&B/Hip-Hop Songs (Billboard)	27
