= J-Hope =

South Korean rapper (born 1994)

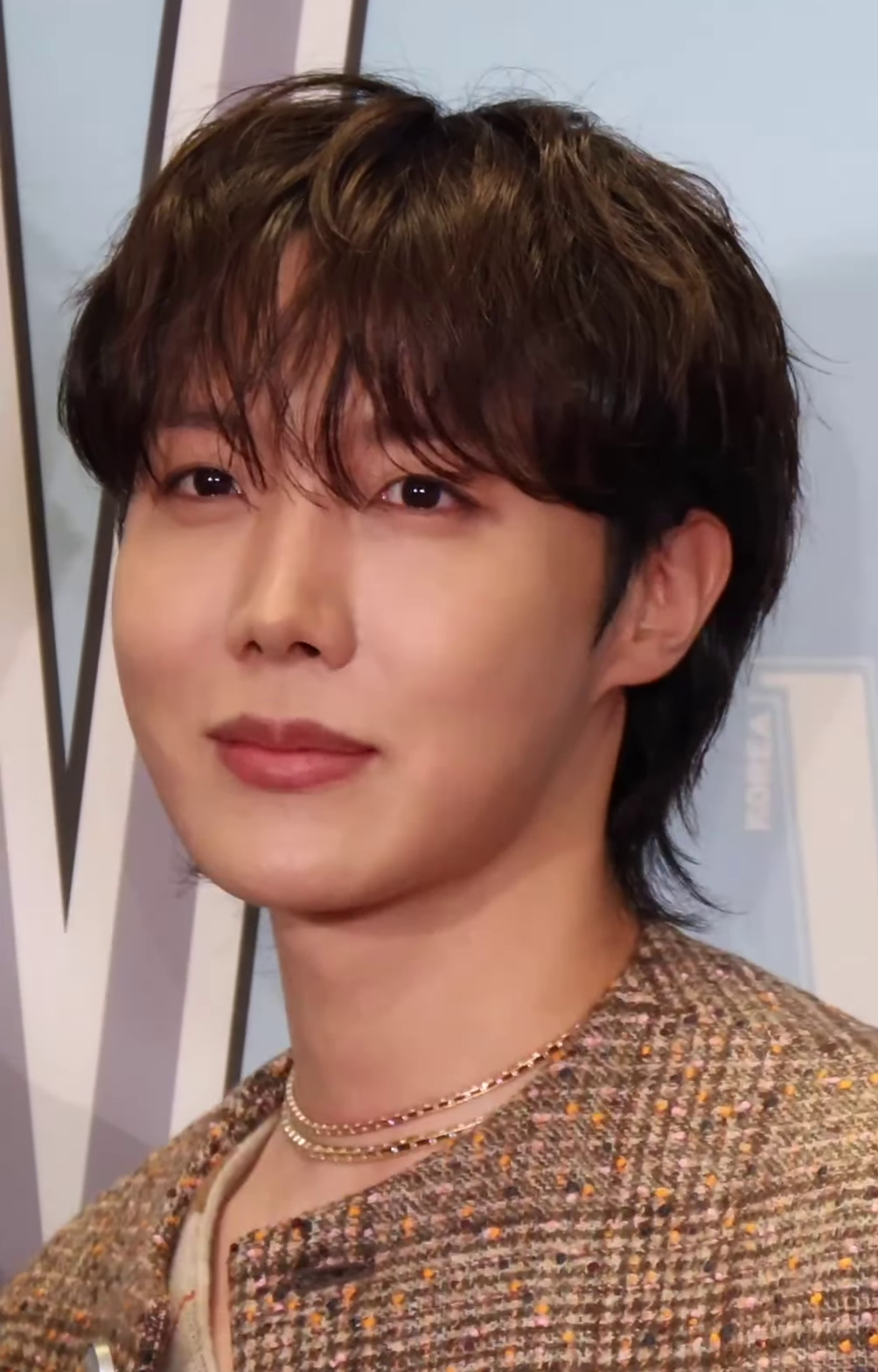
- J-Hope in 2025
- Born: Jung Ho-seok; February 18, 1994 (age 32); Gwangju, South Korea
- Education: Global Cyber University
- Occupations: Rapper; singer; songwriter; dancer; record producer
- Years active: 2012–present
- Works: Discography; Songs written
- Honours: Hwagwan Order of Cultural Merit (2018)
- Musical career
- Genres: Hip-hop; K-pop
- Label: Big Hit
- Member of: BTS

Korean name
- Hangul: 정호석
- Hanja: 鄭號錫
- RR: Jeong Hoseok
- MR: Chŏng Hosŏk

Stage name
- Hangul: 제이홉
- RR: Jeihop
- MR: Cheihop

Jung Ho-seok (Korean: 정호석; born February 18, 1994), known professionally as J-Hope (제이홉; stylized in lower case), is a South Korean rapper, singer, songwriter, dancer, and record producer. He made his debut as a member of South Korean boy band BTS in 2013, under Big Hit Entertainment. J-Hope released his first solo mixtape, Hope World, in 2018. It was received positively by critics and peaked at number 38 on the US Billboard 200, the highest-charting album by a Korean solo artist at the time. He became the first member of BTS to enter the Billboard Hot 100 as a soloist in 2019, when his single "Chicken Noodle Soup", featuring singer Becky G, debuted at number 81. In 2022, J-Hope released his debut studio album Jack in the Box. In 2023, he released his single "On the Street" with J. Cole.

== Early life and education ==
J-Hope was born Jung Ho-seok on February 18, 1994, in Gwangju, South Korea, where he lived with his parents and older sister, Jung Ji-woo. His family is from the Hadong Jeong clan.

In March 2019, J-Hope enrolled at Hanyang Cyber University for the Master of Business Administration program in Advertising and Media. He previously graduated from Global Cyber University with a degree in Broadcasting and Entertainment.

== Career ==
=== 1994–2012: Beginnings ===
Before debuting with BTS, J-Hope was part of an underground dance team called Neuron, and took dance classes at Gwangju Music Academy for six years, from fourth grade to his first year in high school when he signed with Big Hit Entertainment. He was relatively well known for his dance skills, and won various local prizes, including first place in a national dance competition in 2008. His dancing eventually led to an interest in singing, and he auditioned to become an idol trainee. While a trainee, J-Hope appeared as a featured rapper on singer Jo Kwon's song "Animal", released in 2012.

=== 2013–present: BTS ===
On June 13, 2013, J-Hope made his debut as a member of BTS on M! Countdown. He was the third member to join the band as a trainee after RM and Suga. Under the band's name, he has performed four solo songs: "Intro: Boy Meets Evil", "Mama", "Trivia 起: Just Dance", and "Outro: Ego". The first two were released in 2016 as part of BTS' second studio album Wings. Lyrically, "Boy Meets Evil" was about "the thoughts of a boy faced with the evil that is temptation" and showcased J-Hope's rapping abilities, while "Mama" was a "quirky hip-hop" ode of appreciation to his mother that "captures his animated delivery and onstage style. "Just Dance", released in 2018 on the band's fourth studio album Love Yourself: Answer, was a "funky hip-hop" song that "uses the titular activity as a metaphor for love". "Outro: Ego", also an upbeat, "funky" track, from 2020's Map of the Soul: 7, reflected on J-Hope's career and the decisions and hardships he faced through the years, additionally addressing the "dichotomy between his stage persona and his birth identity".

J-Hope also collaborated with bandmate V and Swedish singer Zara Larsson on the single "A Brand New Day" for the official soundtrack of the BTS World mobile video game. The single was released on June 14, 2019.

=== 2018–present: Solo activities ===
J-Hope's first solo release, outside of his work with BTS, was the 2015 rap track "1 Verse"—it sampled "El Chapo" by The Game—uploaded for free via the band's SoundCloud. A darker sound in comparison to what he would become known for later on in his career, the song addressed J-Hope's haters, particularly those who continuously listened to his music just to criticize him, and showcased his ability to mold his vocals and rapping style to reflect the content of his lyrics.

On March 1, 2018, J-Hope released his first solo mixtape Hope World worldwide, accompanied by a music video for the lead single "Daydream". A music video for the B-side single "Airplane" followed on March 6. The mixtape debuted at number 63 and peaked at number 38 on the Billboard 200, making him the highest-charting Korean solo act on the ranking at the time. Six of the album's tracks entered the World Digital Song Sales chart, with "Daydream" topping the chart and making J-Hope one of only ten Korean artists, including BTS, to reach number one. The success of his solo debut led to him ranking at number three on the Emerging Artists chart and peaking at number 91 on the Artist 100; he became the fifth Korean artist and second Korean soloist (after Psy) to chart on the latter. Hope World charted in ten countries worldwide, and "Daydream" charted in three. The mixtape ranked at number five on Billboard's year-end World Albums Chart for 2018. J-Hope released the full version of the mixtape's closing track, "Blue Side (Outro)", for free via BTS' SoundCloud page on March 1, 2021, in celebration of Hope World's third anniversary.

In 2019, J-Hope released a free collaboration single, "Chicken Noodle Soup", featuring American singer Becky G, on September 27. The track debuted at number 81 on the Billboard Hot 100, making J-Hope the first member of BTS to chart on the Hot 100 as a solo artist, the third Korean solo artist to rank on the chart (after Psy and CL), and the sixth Korean artist overall to do so. "Chicken Noodle Soup" also became J-Hope's second song to debut at number one on the World Digital Song Sales chart.

On June 14, 2022, Hybe Corporation announced that J-Hope would be the first member of BTS to begin promotions as a solo artist. His debut solo album Jack in the Box, released on July 15, was preceded by the lead single "More" on July 1. J-Hope made his performance debut at Lollapalooza on July 31, as the headlining act for the final day of the festival. He became the first South Korean artist to headline a main stage at a major United States music festival. In September, J-Hope featured on the single "Rush Hour" by Crush. He was nominated for six awards, including Artist of the Year and Song of the Year, at the MAMA Awards, and made his solo performance debut at the show as the headliner for day two of the event, on November 30. He also made his solo performance debut at Dick Clark's New Year's Rockin' Eve on December 31.

A documentary titled J-Hope in the Box, chronicling the making of J-Hope's debut album and his appearance at Lollapalooza, was released for streaming globally on Weverse and Disney+ in February 2023. He was announced as a brand ambassador for Louis Vuitton that same month. J-Hope released the collaboration single "On the Street", with American rapper J. Cole, on March 3. He became the first member of BTS to earn a top-40 entry on the UK Singles Chart following its debut at number 37, setting a new record as the highest-charting Korean soloist in the history of the chart at the time. He also earned his highest peak on the US Hot 100 at number 60. Big Hit released a six-part docuseries titled Hope on the Street in March 2024, accompanied by the special album Hope on the Street Vol. 1. Recorded before J-Hope began his mandatory military service a year prior, both projects explored his artistic roots and street dance background. The first episode aired globally on March 27 on Prime Video and on TVING in South Korea, while the album followed on March 29, with "Neuron" featuring Gaeko and Yoon Mi-rae as its lead single.

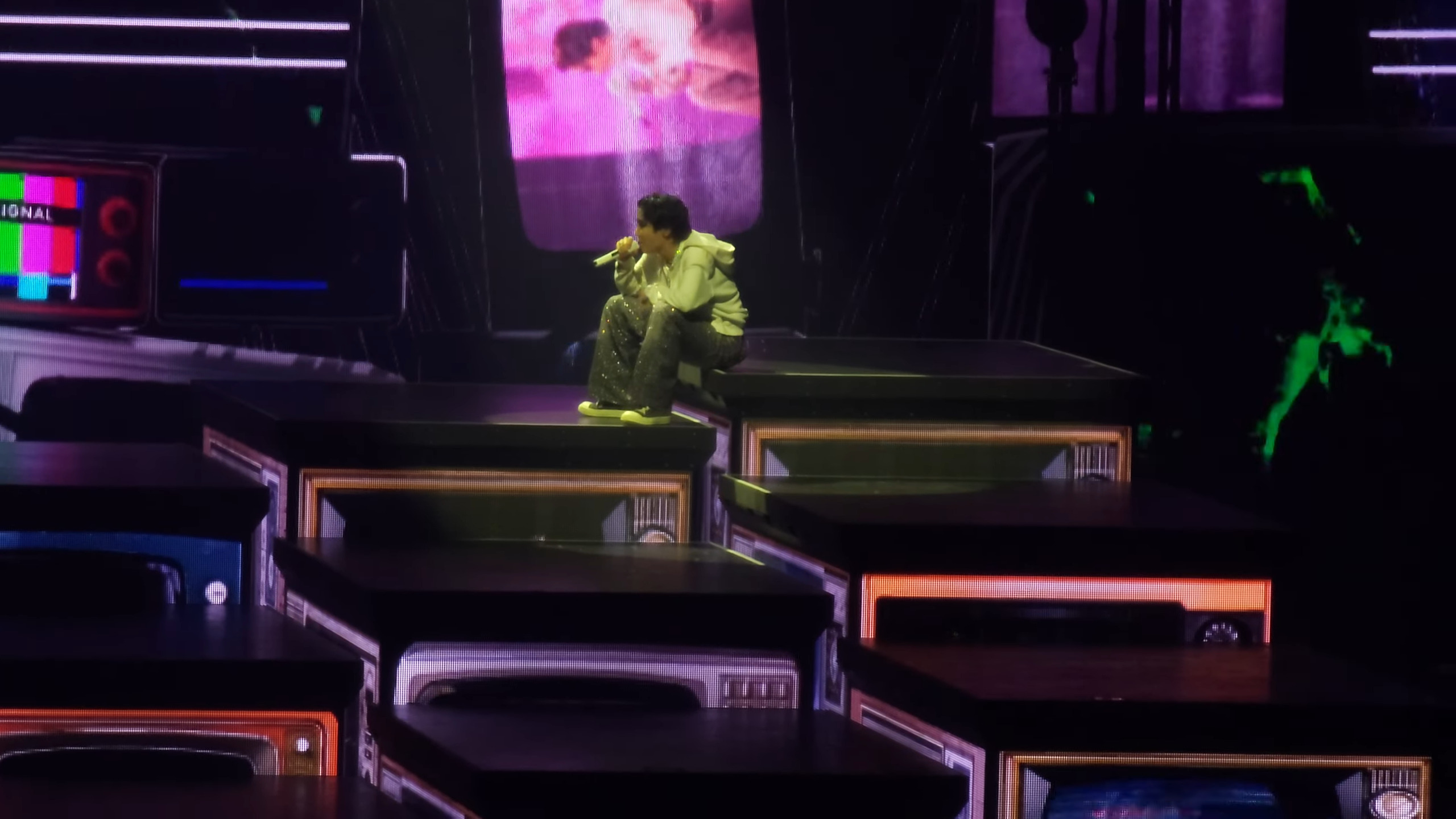
J-Hope performing at Frost Bank Center in San Antonio for the Hope on the Stage tour in March 2025

J-Hope participated in Le Gala des Pièces Jaunes, a charity event hosted by the First Lady of France, Brigitte Macron, in January 2025. Held at La Défense Arena in Paris, he performed a three-song set as the show's opening act—per Macron's request—before a crowd of 35,000 attendees, marking his first musical appearance following the completion of his military service three months prior. His first solo tour, Hope on the Stage, was announced that same month. It began at the end of February in Seoul, then expanded to major cities in Asia and North America; it concluded with a two-day concert on June 13 and 14 at the Goyang Sports Complex Main Stadium in Goyang. In February 2025, J-Hope was announced as one of the headliners at 2025 Lollapalooza Berlin, which took place on July 12 and 13 at Olympic Park and the Olympic Stadium in Berlin.

== Name ==
His stage name, J-Hope (제이홉), comes from his desire to represent hope for fans, as well as to be "the hope of BTS". It is also a reference to the myth of Pandora's box, as after the box was opened and all the evils inside were released to the world, the only thing left was hope.

== Artistry and public image ==
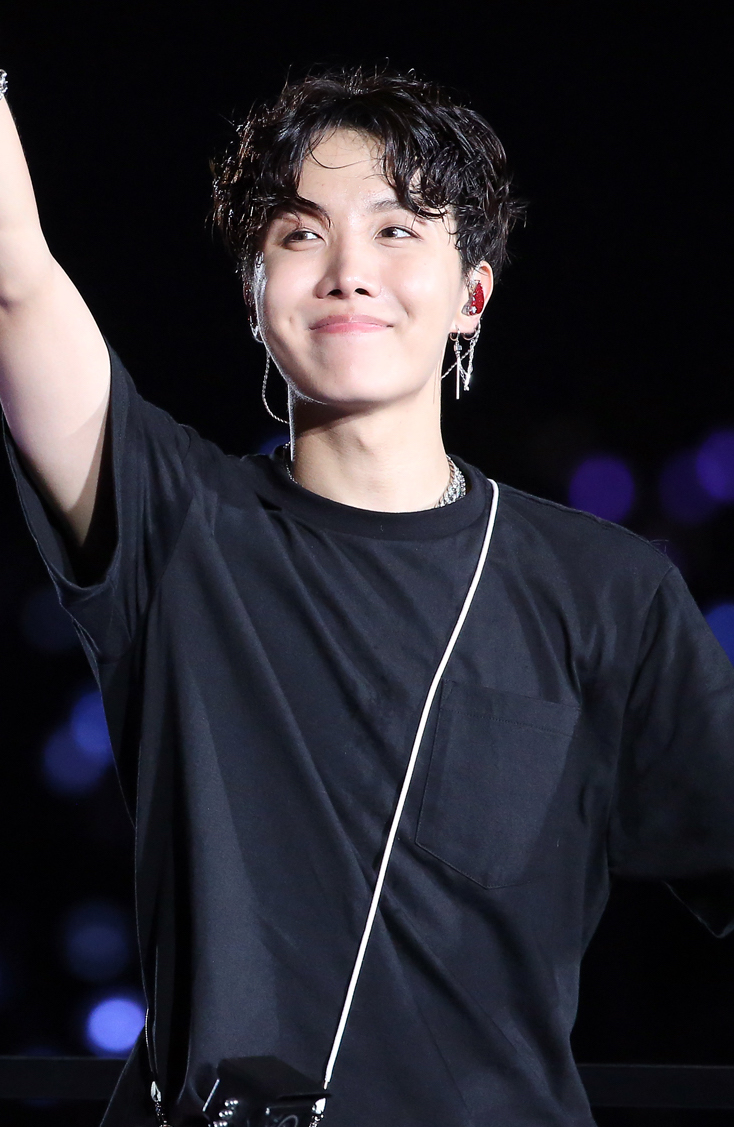
J-Hope performing at the Seoul Olympic Stadium in August 2018, during the Love Yourself World Tour

J-Hope has been described as having an upbeat and energetic tone to his music and performances. His mixtape, Hope World, was described as having a fun nature and variety of musical genres, including synth-pop, trap, house, alternative hip hop, funk-soul, and retro elements. In a review published by The 405, Emmad Usmani praised the mixtape's concept and production, writing "J-Hope showcases exceptional creativity, genuine personality, and a cohesive sense of direction over the 20 minutes of the project". Jeff Benjamin of Fuse wrote that the atmospheric style of "Blue Side", Hope World's outro track, "leaves the listener curious for what's coming next from J-Hope". The lyrical elements of the mixtape, notably the lead song "Daydream", was praised by Billboard for its discussion of the difficulties an idol faces in their career, various literary references, and fun presentation of the serious subject matter.

J-Hope cites the adventurous nature of Jules Verne's Twenty Thousand Leagues Under the Seas and the works of Kyle, Aminé, and Joey Badass as influencers on his style and work on Hope World. The idea of peace has also provided a basis for much of his lyrics, stating that "it'd be fantastic to become a part of someone's personal peace through my music" in an interview with Time. The idea of "representing the modern generation" has also influenced his work on BTS' music. There was also a reference to Douglas Adams' science fiction series The Hitchhiker's Guide to the Galaxy.

In January 2020, J-Hope was promoted to a full member of the Korea Music Copyright Association.

=== Impact ===
In 2018, he was awarded the fifth-class Hwagwan Order of Cultural Merit by the President of South Korea along with the other members of the group. He had the most liked tweet in the world for 2018 when he posted the "In My Feelings Challenge".

In July 2021, he was appointed Special Presidential Envoy for Future Generations and Culture by President Moon Jae-in, along with the other members of BTS, to help "lead the global agenda for future generations, such as sustainable growth" and "expand South Korea's diplomatic efforts and global standing" in the international community.

== Personal life ==
In 2016, J-Hope purchased an apartment in South Korea worth ₩1.78 billion (2016) (equivalent to ₩2.16 billion or US$1.61 million in 2025) for his personal use. As of 2018, he lives in Hannam-dong, Seoul, South Korea with his bandmates.

=== Military service ===
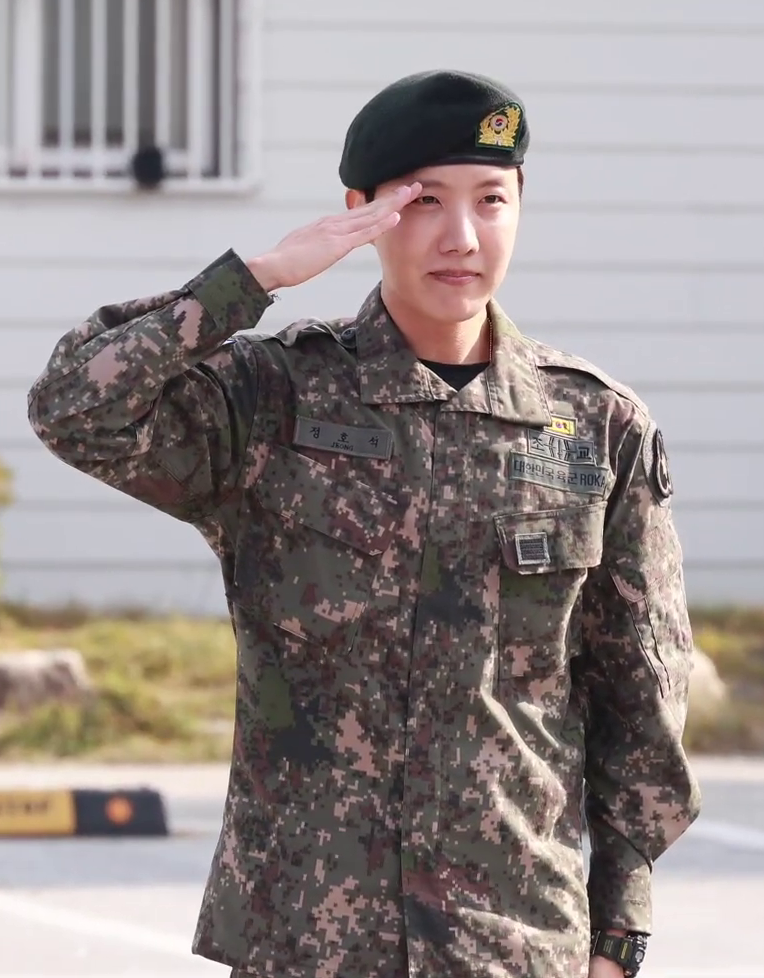
J-Hope being discharged from the military in October 2024

Following revisions made to the Military Service Act in December 2020, J-Hope (alongside the other members of BTS) was granted an automatic postponement of his mandatory military service in 2021, until the end of 2022. On February 26, 2023, Big Hit announced that J-Hope had filed a cancellation request for the deferment and would be proceeding with his conscription. On April 1, having already received his service date, the label published official notice of J-Hope's impending enlistment; the date was not disclosed to the public. He enlisted as an active duty soldier on April 18 at the Army A Division Recruit Training Center in Gangwon Province. Following the completion of his basic training in May 2023, J-Hope was appointed as an assistant training instructor with the 36th Infantry Division in Wonju. He was discharged on October 17, 2024, after completing his eighteen months of service.

=== Philanthropy ===
J-Hope has been a member of the "Green Noble Club", which recognizes high-value donors of Child Fund Korea, (Note: the Green Umbrella's Children Foundation) since 2018. On February 18, 2019, he donated ₩100 million (US$90,000) to the organization in support of those attending his high school alma mater in Gwangju. He previously donated ₩150 million ($135,000) in December 2018, but requested the donation be kept private at the time. In December 2019, he donated another ₩100 million. On November 17, 2020, he donated ₩100 million in support of children experiencing economic difficulties amid the COVID-19 pandemic. On February 18, 2021, he donated ₩150 million to support children with visual and hearing impairments. On May 4, for Children's Day, he donated ₩100 million for children affected by violence in Tanzania, Africa. In December, he donated another ₩100 million, to cover heating expenses for children in low-income families and childcare facilities, and for medical expenses of pediatric patients. J-Hope has donated a cumulative total of ₩800 million to Child Fund Korea since 2018.

Following the 2022 South Korean floods in Seoul, J-Hope donated ₩100 million through the Hope Bridge Korea Disaster Relief Association to assist those affected. In February 2023, he donated ₩100 million, through the Korean UNICEF Committee, towards emergency relief for children affected by the Turkey–Syria earthquake.

Following the crash of Jeju Air Flight 2216 in December 2024, J-Hope donated ₩100 million ($68,000) to families of the victims as a "small measure of support". In February, Seoul Asan Medical Center Children's Hospital revealed that he donated ₩200 million which will be used to improve treatment facilities for the patients, as well as for research into severe and rare incurable diseases.

In March 2025, J-Hope donated ₩100 million to the Hope Bridge Disaster Relief Association for wildfire relief efforts due to wildfire damages in the Ulsan, Gyeongbuk, and Gyeongnam regions.

== Discography ==
- Jack in the Box (2022)

== Filmography ==
=== Television ===
Year	Program	Role	Note(s)	Ref.
2016	Inkigayo	Host	V, Moonbyul & Wheein	
2016	Show! Music Core	Host	with Jungkook	
2017	M Countdown	Host	with RM & Jimin	
2017	M Countdown	Host	with Jimin & Jin	
2019	Under Nineteen	Himself	Dance tutor; episode 10	
2022	IU's Palette	Himself	Episode 14	
2023	J-Hope in the Box	Himself	documentary; available on Weverse and Disney+	
2024	Hope on the Street	Himself	docuseries; available on Prime Video and TVING	

== Tours ==
- Hope on the Stage Tour (2025)

== Accolades ==
=== Awards and nominations ===
Name of the award ceremony, year presented, category, nominee of the award, and the result of the nomination
Award ceremony	Year	Category	Nominee(s)/work(s)	Result	Ref.
Asia Artist Awards	2026	Popularity Award – Solo (Male)	J-Hope	Pending	
Circle Chart Music Awards	2023	Song of the Year – July	"More"	Nominated	
Circle Chart Music Awards	2023	Song of the Year – July	"Arson"	Nominated	
Circle Chart Music Awards	2023	Song of the Year – September	"Rush Hour" (with Crush)	Nominated	
The Fact Music Awards	2023	Best Music (Spring)	"On the Street" (with J. Cole)	Nominated	
The Fact Music Awards	2023	Fan N Star Choice Award – Individual	J-Hope	Nominated	
The Fact Music Awards	2023	IdolPlus Popularity Award	J-Hope	Nominated	
The Fact Music Awards	2025	Best Music - Spring	Sweet Dreams	Won	
Filipino Music Awards	2025	People's Choice Awards: International Artist	J-Hope	Won	
Golden Disc Awards	2023	Thai Fans Support with Baoji	J-Hope	Won	
Golden Disc Awards	2023	Best Album (Bonsang)	Jack in the Box	Nominated	
Golden Disc Awards	2023	Most Popular Artist Award	J-Hope	Nominated	
Grammy Awards	2023	Album of the Year	Music of the Spheres (Note: as songwriter)	Nominated	
Hanteo Music Awards	2024	Artist of the Year (Bonsang)	J-Hope	Nominated	
iHeartRadio Music Awards	2024	Favourite On Screen	J-Hope in the Box	Won	
iHeartRadio Music Awards	2026	K-Pop Artist of the Year	J-hope	Nominated	
iHeartRadio Music Awards	2026	K-pop Song of the Year	"Killin' It Girl"	Nominated	
iHeartRadio Music Awards	2026	Favourite Tiktok Dance	"Mona Lisa"	Won	
iHeartRadio Music Awards	2026	Favourite Tiktok Dance	"Spaghetti"	Nominated	
iHeartRadio Music Awards	2026	Favourite K-pop Collab	"Sweet Dreams"	Won	
Korea Broadcasting Awards	2025	Best Singer	J-Hope	Won	
Korea Grand Music Awards	2025	Best Hip-Hop	"Killin' It Girl" (solo version)"	Won	
Korean Hip-hop Awards	2023	R&B Track of the Year	"Rush Hour" (with Crush)	Won	
MAMA Awards	2022	Culture & Style Award	J-Hope	Won	
MAMA Awards	2022	Most Popular Male Artist	J-Hope	Won	
MAMA Awards	2022	Artist of the Year	J-Hope	Nominated	
MAMA Awards	2022	Best Collaboration	"Rush Hour" (with Crush)	Nominated	
MAMA Awards	2022	Song of the Year	"More"	Nominated	
MAMA Awards	2022	Song of the Year	"Rush Hour" (with Crush)	Nominated	
MAMA Awards	2022	Best Male Artist	J-Hope	Nominated	
MAMA Awards	2022	Best Hip Hop & Urban Music	"More"	Nominated	
MAMA Awards	2023	Best Rap & Hip Hop Performance	"On the Street" (with J. Cole)	Nominated	
MAMA Awards	2023	Song of the Year	"On the Street" (with J. Cole)	Longlisted	
MAMA Awards	2025	Song of the Year	"Mona Lisa"	Nominated	
MAMA Awards	2025	Artist of The Year	J-Hope	Nominated	
MAMA Awards	2025	Fans' Choice of the Year	J-Hope	Nominated	
MAMA Awards	2025	Best Male Artist	J-Hope	Nominated	
MAMA Awards	2025	Best Dance Performance – Male Solo	"Mona Lisa"	Nominated	
MAMA Awards	2025	Fans' Choice Top 10	J-Hope	Won	
MAMA Awards	2026	Best Collaboration	"Spaghetti" (with Le Sserafim)	Won	
MAMA Awards	2026	Best Song Top 10	"Spaghetti" (with Le Sserafim)	Won	
MAMA Awards	2026	Best Dance Performance	"Spaghetti" (with Le Sserafim)	Nominated	
MTV Video Music Awards	2026	Best K-pop	"Spaghetti" (with Le Sserafim)	Nominated	
SEC Awards (Note: The SEC Awards, formerly known as the Séries em Cena Awards, is a Brazilian award show that honors achievements in music, film, television, and internet culture in Brazil and globally.)
SEC Awards	2025	International Feat of the Year	Sweet Dreams	Won	
SEC Awards	2025	Asian Artist of the Year	J-Hope	Won	
SEC Awards	2025	International Male Artist of the Year	J-Hope	Nominated	
SEC Awards	2026	International Feat of the Year	"Spaghetti" (with Le Sserafim)	Won	
SEC Awards	2026	Asian Artist of the Year	J-Hope	Nominated	
SEC Awards	2026	International Male Artist of the Year	J-Hope	Nominated	
Seoul Music Awards	2023	Bonsang Award	Jack in the Box	Nominated	
Seoul Music Awards	2023	K-wave Award	J-Hope	Nominated	
Seoul Music Awards	2023	Popularity Award	J-Hope	Nominated	
Seoul Music Awards	2023	Fan Choice of the Year – April	J-Hope	Nominated	
Seoul Music Awards	2024	Hallyu Special Award	J-Hope	Nominated	
Seoul Music Awards	2024	Main Award (Bonsang)	J-Hope	Nominated	
Seoul Music Awards	2024	Popularity Award	J-Hope	Nominated	
Seoul Music Awards	2026	K-pop World Choice – Solo	J-Hope	Nominated	
Seoul Music Awards	2026	Best Song Award	"Spaghetti" (with Le Sserafim)	Won	

=== Listicles ===
Name of publisher, year listed, name of listicle, and placement
Publisher	Year	Listicle	Placement	Ref.
Billboard	2024	K-Pop Artist 100	62th	
Billboard	2025	K-Pop Artist 100	82th	
Forbes Korea	2025	K-Idol of the Year 30	16th	
Forbes Korea	2026	Power Celebrity 40	10th	
