= On the Street =

Single by J-Hope and J. Cole

from the album Hope on the Street Vol. 1
- Language: Korean; English
- Released: March 3, 2023
- Genre: Lofi hip hop
- Length: 3:34
- Label: Big Hit Music
- Songwriters: J-Hope; J. Cole; Pdogg
- Producer: Pdogg

J-Hope singles chronology
"Rush Hour" (2022)	"On the Street" (2023)	"Neuron" (2024)

J. Cole singles chronology
"Procrastination (Broke)" (2023)	"On the Street" (2023)	"All My Life" (2023)

Music video
- j-hope 'On The Street (with J. Cole)' on YouTube

"On the Street" (stylized in lowercase) is a song by South Korean rapper J-Hope of BTS and American rapper J. Cole. It was released as a digital single through Big Hit Music on March 3, 2023. A lofi hip hop track, the song was written by J-Hope, Cole, and Pdogg, who also served as producer. Lyrically the song is an ode to J-Hope's artistic roots and the intersection of his love for street dance and hip hop. Cole's verse follows a similar theme, detailing his journey as an artist and the evolution of his craft. An accompanying music video shows J-Hope walking and dancing through the streets of New York City then in the Bowery subway station while Cole is seen standing and dancing on the rooftop of a city building.

Described as a "gift" to his fans, the single marked J-Hope's final music release before he began his mandatory military service in April 2023. A solo version of the song without Cole was released in March 2024, as part of J-Hope's first extended play Hope on the Street Vol. 1 (2024).

== Background and release ==
J-Hope released his debut solo album Jack in the Box in July 2022. The album debuted at number 17 on the Billboard 200, while both of its singles, "More" and "Arson", debuted on the Billboard Hot 100. He then featured on the single "Rush Hour" by South Korean singer Crush in September, following the latter's completion of his mandatory military service in August. On February 26, 2023, Big Hit Music announced that J-Hope had begun the enlistment process and would be carrying out his own military service soon. Shortly afterwards, the label posted notice of a new single by J-Hope, titled "On The Street", scheduled for release on March 3.

A four-set of teaser photos, featuring J-Hope posing in an alleyway and on the street in New York City, was shared via Big Hit's social media accounts on March 1, 2023—J-Hope also shared the photos on his Instagram. American rapper J. Cole's appearance on the song was revealed through a music video teaser uploaded to YouTube on March 2. J-Hope has been a fan of Cole since his youth and throughout his career—he referenced the rapper's Cole World (2011) album and Friday Night Lights (2010) mixtape in his verse on the 2014 BTS song "Hip Hop Lover"— and considers the rapper his "muse", citing him as his musical inspiration on several occasions. The two first met at Lollapalooza in July 2022, where they were both headliners. In the documentary J-Hope in the Box, which chronicles the creation of Jack in the Box and his preparations for Lollapalooza, J-Hope said that Cole was the artist that made him "dream of becoming a singer".

== Music and lyrics ==
The song's title refers to J-Hope's roots in street dance and symbolizes the path he "will continue to walk together" with his fans. Per a press release from Big Hit, the "street" motif can also be interpreted as a "metaphor for life", as it is "a place where many people's everyday lives pass by". Intended as a "meaningful gift" from J-Hope "to everyone who supports [him as an] artist", the song was co-written by J-Hope, Cole, and Pdogg, who also served as producer. "On the Street" is a lofi hip hop track with "elements of boom bap mixed with a catchy whistle hook" and an "easy-listening melody". Tom Breiham of Stereogum described it as a "pop-rap song" with a "sprightly beat...built on a whistling melody" from J-Hope. Lyrically, it contains "warm-hearted lyrics" and a "hopeful message". J-Hope performs his verse primarily in Korean, with some lines in English.

J-Hope opens the track addressing his fans, singing: "Every time I walk / Every time I run / Every time I move / As always, for us" then later rapping "Even my walk was made of your love and your faith". He talks about growth; giving "his all to be a symbol of hope" for others (the "Every time I hope, as always, for us" line of the chorus); and encourages the listener to "go on hopefully, wherever you walk". Cole's verse follows next and is a "candid, reflective section" that "look[s] back with appreciation on the rapper's journey: 'All hail the mighty survivor of hell…/ Fought tooth and nail/ Just to prevail 'mongst its most ruthless'". He goes on to contemplate his future as an artist, "As the moon jumps over the cow/ I contemplate if I should wait to hand over the crown/ And stick around for a bit longer/ I got a strange type of hunger". J-Hope repeats "the anthemic chorus" to close out the song, and includes a shoutout to Cole World.

== Critical reception ==
"On the Street" received generally positive reviews from music critics upon release, with praise for the way J-Hope and Cole complement each other on the track as well as the warm and empowering messages contained within the song. Rhian Daly of NME gave the song a four-star rating in her review for the publication, noting the "more relaxed and looser" nature of the song in comparison to the "darkness" of Jack in the Box. She wrote that the track "feels like J-hope's only concern here is leaving things on a high and showing gratitude for those who have supported him along the way", but opined that his impending military service made the otherwise "dream come true" collaboration "bittersweet", "turning it into a farewell". Daly mentioned Cole's appearance on the track as the latest example of his notoriety as "a feature slayer, famous for his ability to bring a momentary Midas touch to any track", calling it "both that and also something more – perhaps why the release isn't billed as 'featuring' but 'with'". She praised the way the rapper "effortlessly electrified" the "undertones of emotion in the song's whistling melody", complementing J-Hope's "light to [his] shade", but expressed a "desire to see J-Hope use his muse's energy to make his own parts really sizzle." Echoing sentiments similar to Daly's about Cole's feature, Breihan commented that Cole "takes the song seriously, and he treats it the same way he'd treat a feature for YG or Benny the Butcher or Smino."

In her review for Nylon, music writer India Roby described "On the Street" as a "not farewell, but see-you-later-of-sorts" that "encapsulates...feelings of gratitude and empowerment" with both artists "seamlessly flow[ing] and complement[ing] one another". She concluded that while it might possibly be the last song fans would hear from J-Hope for a while, the song "accomplishes one mission: to make sure his appreciation for his fans' support echoes all over the world." Writing for Billboard, Jeff Benjamin commented that "On the Street" is "brimming with gratitude" and "true to both artists' penchant for invigorating and socially conscious messages", and felt that "the song's warm energy is undeniable. Alex Gonzalez of Uproxx described the release as "continuing a fire run of solo bangers" from J-Hope. He felt that the rapper's confidence in his "fresh solo era" coupled with his desire "to share that joy with the world" and "the song's breezy, empowering beat" made it feel like "years of dreams wrapped inside of a beautiful package." GMA Network's Nika Roque called the song "smooth yet emotional", J-Hope's lyrics "heartwarming" and "comforting", and Cole's verses "equally moving".

== Commercial performance ==
"On the Street" sold 5,728 downloads on its opening day in Japan and debuted atop the March 3, 2023 issue of Oricon's daily Digital Singles Chart. It ranked at number two on its second day with a further 1,316 downloads sold. Despite being released partway through an ongoing tracking week (February 27–March 5, 2023), the song debuted at number two on the weekly issue of the Digital chart dated March 13, having sold 7,702 cumulative copies during its first three days of availability. According to Billboard Japan, the song was the second most-downloaded track of the week and J-Hope reentered the domestic Artist 100 chart at number 79.

J-Hope earned his first top-40 entry in the UK, while Cole earned his ninth, following "On the Street"'s debut at number 37 on the UK Singles Chart. This made him the highest-charting Korean soloist in the history of the chart, surpassing previous record-holder bandmate Jungkook who peaked at number 41 with Charlie Puth on "Left and Right"; J-Hope is the first member of BTS to reach the top-40 as a soloist. The song was the second most-downloaded track of its release week and the second best-selling single overall.

In the United States, "On the Street" debuted at number 60 on the Billboard Hot 100, marking J-Hope's fourth and highest entry on the chart; he previously peaked at number 81 with "Chicken Noodle Soup" in 2019. It was the second best-selling song of the week in the country and J-Hope reentered the Artist 100 at number 31. The song also debuted on the corresponding issues of the Billboard Global 200 and Global Excl. US charts, dated March 18, 2023, at number 16.

== Music video ==
A 40-second long video teaser preceded the music video on March 2, 2023. Uploaded to the Hybe Labels YouTube channel, the clip opened with a shot of J-Hope from behind, walking atop the roof of a city building with the Manhattan Bridge visible in the background. The camera then panned to the side to show Cole leaning against a ledge on the same rooftop waiting for him. Both rappers gazed into the distance at the cityscape while the "whistling of a melodic tune" played in the background as the camera panned upwards to the skyline. The song's title and Cole's name appeared at the end.

Filmed in New York City, the music video was released simultaneously alongside the single on March 3, 2023. It opens with J-Hope in an alleyway "high-fiving a kid before the melody starts". He walks and dances through the city's streets singing and rapping as the video progresses. Interspersed with his scenes are shots of Cole standing on the rooftop where the teaser took place. J-Hope then enters the Bowery subway station as Cole begins rapping his verses, and dances freestyle on an empty platform. He exits the subway as the song winds down and the visual fades to black. A bonus end-scene shows J-Hope meeting Cole atop the rooftop and the two "exchanging pleasantries", reminiscent of the scene from the teaser, before again fading to black.

== Accolades ==
Though J-Hope did not appear on any domestic television music programs to promote the song, "On the Street" was nominated for first place on the March 9, 2023, episode of M Countdown, alongside "Teddy Bear" by STAYC, and won. The song achieved a second consecutive win on the March 16 episode, against "Set Me Free" by Twice. It also won the weekly Melon Popularity Award for the third week of March, ending March 20. The song was later nominated in the Best Music (Spring) category at the Fact Music Awards, and for Best Rap & Hip Hop Performance and Song of the Year at the 2023 MAMA Awards.

== Charts ==
=== Weekly charts ===
Weekly chart performance
Chart (2023)	Peak position
Australia (ARIA)	83
Canada Hot 100 (Billboard)	58
Global 200 (Billboard)	16
Greece International (IFPI)	59
Hungary (Single Top 40)	2
India International Singles (IMI)	14
Ireland (IRMA)	57
Japan Hot 100 (Billboard)	75
Japan Digital Singles (Oricon)	2
Lithuania (AGATA)	74
Netherlands (Single Tip)	30
New Zealand Hot Singles (RMNZ)	4
Portugal (AFP)	131
Singapore (RIAS)	20
South Korea (Circle)	36
UK Singles (Official Charts)	37
UK Hip Hop/R&B (Official Charts)	24
US Billboard Hot 100	60
US Hot R&B/Hip-Hop Songs (Billboard)	14
Vietnam (Vietnam Hot 100)	20

=== Monthly charts ===
Monthly chart performance
Chart (2023)	Position
South Korea (Circle)	36

=== Year-end charts ===
Year-end chart performance
Chart (2023)	Position
South Korea (Circle)	144
US Digital Song Sales (Billboard)	49

== Release history ==
Release dates and formats for "On the Street"
Region	Date	Format(s)	Label	Ref.
Various	March 3, 2023	Digital download; streaming	Big Hit	
Italy	March 17, 2023	Radio airplay	Universal	
