= List of Billboard Artist 100 number one artists of 2024 =

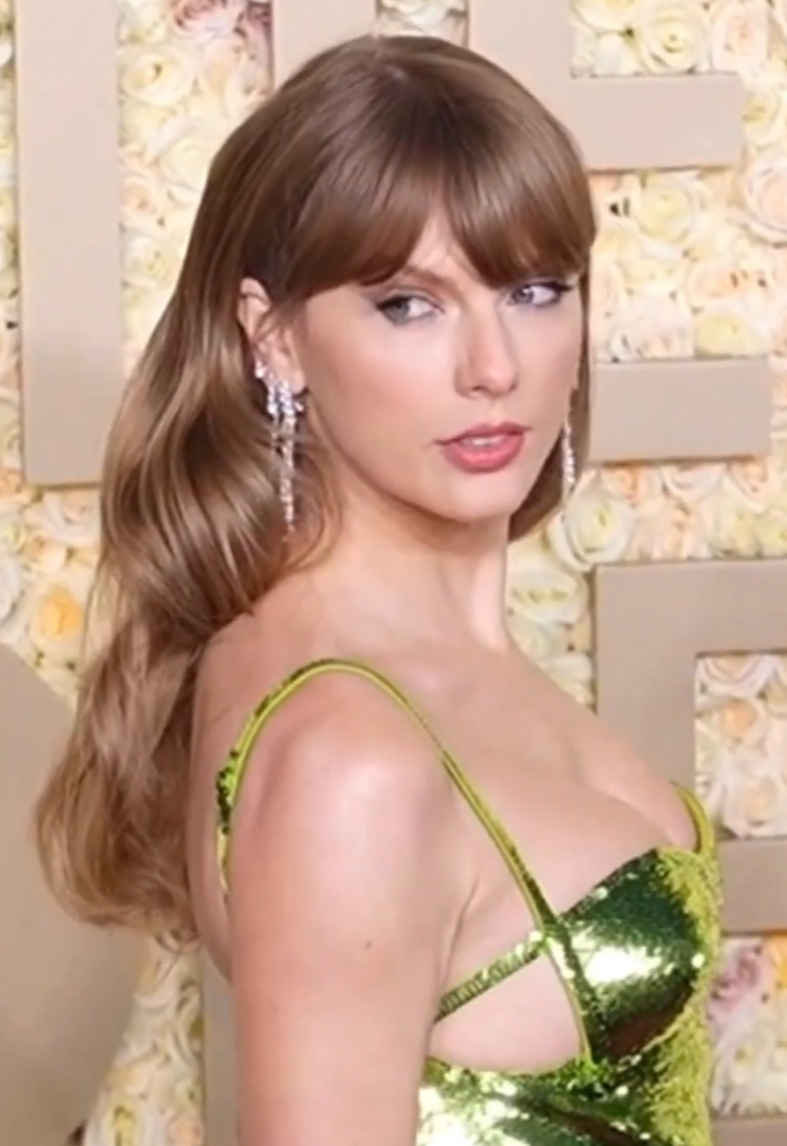
Singer Taylor Swift spent more than half of 2024 atop the Artist 100 chart, spending 32 weeks atop the chart. The most of any artist of 2024.

The Artist 100 is a chart published by Billboard that ranks the top musical artists that are best-performing based on their current popularity in the United States. Its data is compiled by Luminate Data and published by American music magazine Billboard.

== Chart history ==
Key
†	Indicates best-performing artist of 2024

No. (Note: Indicates the artists total week at number one. For example, if this column said 1, then this would indicate that it’s the artists first week at number one.)	Issue date	Artist or Act	Ref.
92	January 6	Taylor Swift†	
93	January 13	Taylor Swift†	
94	January 20	Taylor Swift†	
95	January 27	Taylor Swift†	
96	February 3	Taylor Swift†	
97	February 10	Taylor Swift†	
98	February 17	Taylor Swift†	
99	February 24	Taylor Swift†	
100	March 2	Taylor Swift†	
101	March 9	Taylor Swift†	
102	March 16	Taylor Swift†	
16	March 23	Ariana Grande	
103	March 30	Taylor Swift†	
104	April 6	Taylor Swift†	
3	April 13	Beyoncé	
2	April 20	Tomorrow X Together	
105	April 27	Taylor Swift†	
106	May 4	Taylor Swift†	
107	May 11	Taylor Swift†	
108	May 18	Taylor Swift†	
109	May 25	Taylor Swift†	
110	June 1	Taylor Swift†	
111	June 8	Taylor Swift†	
112	June 15	Taylor Swift†	
113	June 22	Taylor Swift†	
114	June 29	Taylor Swift†	
115	July 6	Taylor Swift†	
116	July 13	Taylor Swift†	
117	July 20	Taylor Swift†	
5	July 27	Eminem	
4	August 3	Stray Kids	
118	August 10	Taylor Swift†	
119	August 17	Taylor Swift†	
120	August 24	Taylor Swift†	
15	August 31	Post Malone	
1	September 7	Sabrina Carpenter	
2	September 14	Sabrina Carpenter	
3	September 21	Sabrina Carpenter	
4	September 28	Travis Scott	
1	October 5	Chappell Roan	
4	October 12	Sabrina Carpenter	
1	October 19	Coldplay	
1	October 26	Jelly Roll	
14	November 2	Morgan Wallen	
4	November 9	Tyler, The Creator	
5	November 16	Tyler, The Creator	
3	November 23	Tomorrow X Together	
1	November 30	Ateez	
7	December 7	Kendrick Lamar	
121	December 14	Taylor Swift†	
122	December 21	Taylor Swift†	
5	December 28	Stray Kids	

List of number-one artists by total weeks at number one
Artist	Weeks at No. 1
Taylor Swift	32
Sabrina Carpenter	4
Tomorrow X Together	2
Stray Kids	2
Tyler, The Creator	2
Ariana Grande	1
Beyoncé	1
Eminem	1
Post Malone	1
Travis Scott	1
Chappell Roan	1
Coldplay	1
Jelly Roll	1
Morgan Wallen	1
Ateez	1
Kendrick Lamar	1

== See also ==
- List of Billboard 200 number-one albums of 2024
- List of Billboard Global 200 number ones of 2024
- List of Billboard Hot 100 top-ten singles in 2024
- List of Billboard Hot 100 number ones of 2024
- List of Billboard Hot 100 number-one singles of the 2020s
- 2024 in American music
