= Rush Hour (Crush song) =

Single by Crush featuring J-Hope
- Language: Korean; English
- Released: September 22, 2022
- Length: 2:57
- Label: P Nation
- Songwriters: Crush; J-Hope; Penomeco

Crush singles chronology
"Happier (with Psy)" (2022)	"Rush Hour" (2022)

J-Hope singles chronology
"Arson" (2022)	"Rush Hour" (2022)	"On the Street" (2023)

Music video
- "Rush Hour" on YouTube

"Rush Hour" is a song by South Korean singer Crush featuring J-Hope of BTS. Released as a digital single on September 24, 2022, by P Nation through Dreamus, the song is Crush's first project since completing his mandatory military service in August. It was co-written by Crush, J-Hope, and Penomeco. An accompanying music video was released the same day as the single and shows Crush and J-Hope singing the song and performing choreography together with a group of dancers in an alleyway and on the street.

The single peaked at number four on the South Korean Circle Digital Chart and number one on Billboard's World Digital Song Sales chart in the United States. It won R&B Track of the Year at the 2023 Korean Hip-hop Awards.

== Music and lyrics ==
Sung in both Korean and English, "Rush Hour" is a "jazzy", "Nineties vibe-filled", "funk and soul track" with a "groovy hip hop instrumental" written by Crush, J-Hope, and Penomeco. In his opening verse, Crush references his absence from and subsequent return to music following the end of his conscription: "It's been 2 whole years of this/Held my tongue for way too long/Set my destination to the studio, 'cause I can/This is Crush hour get out the way." The song compares people gathering together to enjoy "Crush hour" to a traffic jam, a metaphor the singer emphasizes again in the first chorus when he sings "So let me hear y'all scream hibihibi hop, just like that/Again clap clap clap and then hit that/Gather one and all like traffic jam/Get up, get up." J-Hope comes in next with "a fun verse" showcasing "classic rap braggadocio about his meteoric rise to fame as a member of BTS: 'Yo, I've been walking on the streets, yo/ From Seoul Forest and around the block/ But wherever I go now, it's a red carpet feel, yo/ Cameras snapping wherever I go, like flash-flash/ Crowds of people, feels like traffic.'" The rapper also keeps in line with the established theme of celebrating Crush's comeback as he continues: "Y'all trippin', whole lotta freaks/And now, [it's] Crush hour/ Imma just follow his lead".

== Background and release ==
Crush and J-Hope first came in contact when J-Hope reached out to the singer with a request for him to perform at his sister's wedding. As a token of thanks to Crush for fulfilling that request, J-Hope later visited the singer at his studio and the two had a meal and drinks together. They discussed various things during that time including music. J-Hope informed Crush about his then-upcoming debut album and asked the singer for feedback on the project. Crush obliged and was so impressed with the quality and consistency of the music that he told J-Hope about "Rush Hour" in return. After playing the track for the rapper, who liked it very much, Crush asked if he wanted to feature on the song and J-Hope agreed. The singer later said, in interviews subsequent to the single's release, that that day did not feel like they just said "Let's work together" and then did it, but that they had become friends.

The song was recorded at Studio Wanderlust and Hope World in South Korea. Mixing took place at Stay Tuned Studios, while mastering was done by Randy Merrill at Sterling Sound in the United States.

On September 6, 2022, Crush's label P Nation made a "Coming Up Next" post on its social media featuring a close-up photo of the singer's face styled as an AirDrop request. "크러쉬'님이 컴백 일정을 공유하려고 합니다", which translates to "Crush would like to share a comeback schedule", was displayed atop the image, with options to Accept or Decline the request, while "CRUSH COMEBACK" was printed in English at the bottom. The following day, a moving poster of Crush in the driver's seat of a car, turning to stare into the camera as horns blare loudly in the background, was shared online, with "Rush Hour" and "2022.9.22 6PM KST" displayed on the lower half of the visual. News media revealed that "Rush Hour" was the title of the singer's upcoming single slated for release on various music platforms at the time and date shown in the poster. A "Jacket Mood" teaser, similar in design to a lookbook, showcasing collages of various outfits, shoes and accessories for the singer, was released on September 13. The first set of concept photos for the single, featuring Crush wearing items seen in the mood teaser, followed later that same day. Two more sets of concept photos were published on September 14. A minute-long clip containing behind-the-scenes footage of the song's recording process and related photoshoots was shared on September 15, while the cover art was posted on September 16. A short lyric teaser clip was posted on two days later.

Crush's first single in two years since enlisting to fulfill his mandatory military service, "Rush Hour" was released as scheduled on September 22, 2022.

== Music video ==
Three teasers preceded the music video. The first, released on September 19, showed a crowded street with pedestrians moving in reverse as the song's instrumental plays. They begin dancing around Crush who eventually joins them. The end of the clip revealed J-Hope of BTS as the featured artist on the track when his name appeared onscreen below the single's title. At the time, no announcement was made regarding his inclusion in the music video. The second teaser, released the following day, showed two men from afar with their backs to the camera, leaning against a parked car outside a coffee shop. When the camera zooms in, both men turn around, revealing themselves to be J-Hope and Crush, thereby confirming the former's participation in the video. A third and final teaser, released on the 21st, highlighted a dance sequence from the music video. It features Crush and J-Hope performing point choreography (Note: In K-pop, a point dance or point choreography refers to a signature dance move or the most prominent dance move within a set choreography that "match[es] and highlight[es] the characteristics of the lyrics and rhythm of [a] song." They are usually easy-to-follow movements that help capture the viewer's attention in a song and can be replicated by fans.) together with a group of dancers.

Shot in a "big-city setting filled with yellow taxi cars, graffiti painted walls, scaffold-littered side streets and abandoned bus stops", the music video premiered on Crush's YouTube channel simultaneously alongside the single's release on September 22. The visual opens with the same crowded scene from the first teaser. Crush performs the song while walking down the street. He is then seen "chilling out" with a large group of dancers who "perform hip-hop dance moves in the middle of the street". J-Hope arrives next and dances with the dancers while rapping his verse. He incorporates some BTS dance moves in his choreography.

Lai Frances of Uproxx described the music video as "quite reminiscent of a funky West Side Story-like musical production, where Crush is the main character and J-Hope is the supporting act.

A dance practice video was uploaded on September 26. Behind-the-scenes footage of the music video's filming followed a day later.

== Promotion and live performances ==
Crush performed the song on 1theK's RE:@LIVE the day of the single's release. He appeared on episode 15 of IU's YouTube series IU's Palette, released on September 22, where he discussed his comeback, working with J-Hope, and performed "Rush Hour" together with a cover of IU's song "Lullaby". On September 24, Crush's new driving show, BlackVox, premiered on YouTube, with J-Hope as the inaugural episode's guest. While driving around together, the two artists discussed how the collaboration came about, the song's lyrics, the music video filming, and their friendship. They also sang the song together while it played in the car.

== Accolades ==
"Rush Hour" received nominations for Best Collaboration and Song of the Year at the 2022 MAMA Awards, and Global Digital Music – September at the 12th Circle Chart Music Awards. It won R&B Track of the Year at the Korean Hip-hop Awards held in March 2023.

== Personnel ==
Credits adapted from Melon.

- Crush – songwriting, composition, arrangement, chorus, drum programming, bass, digital editing
- Hong So-jin – composition, arrangement, drum programming, bass, organ, synth
- J-Hope – songwriting, chorus
- Kim Dong-min – guitar
- Randy Merrill – mastering
- Penomeco – songwriting, composition, arrangement
- Stay Tuned – mixing

== Charts ==
=== Weekly charts ===
Weekly chart performance for "Rush Hour"
Chart (2022)	Peak position
Global 200 (Billboard)	102
Hungary (Single Top 40)	17
Japan Digital Singles (Oricon)	47
New Zealand Hot (Recorded Music NZ)	17
South Korea (Circle)	4
UK Singles Sales (OCC)	43
US Digital Songs (Billboard)	5
US World Digital Song Sales (Billboard)	1

=== Monthly charts ===
Monthly chart performance for "Rush Hour"
Chart (2022)	Position
South Korea (Circle)	4

=== Year-end charts ===
2022 year-end chart performance for "Rush Hour"
Chart (2022)	Position
South Korea (Circle)	90

2023 year-end chart performance for "Rush Hour"
Chart (2023)	Position
South Korea (Circle)	85

== Release history ==
Release dates and formats for "Rush Hour"
Region	Date	Format(s)	Label	Ref.
Various	September 22, 2022	Digital download; streaming	P Nation	
