= Killin' It Girl =

2025 single by J-Hope featuring GloRilla

Single by J-Hope featuring GloRilla
- Released: June 13, 2025
- Genre: Pop; hip-hop
- Length: 2:28
- Label: Big Hit
- Songwriters: Jung Ho-seok; Gloria Woods; Henry Walter; Blake Slatkin; Charles Nelsen; Jessica Agombar; Theron Thomas; Kang Hyo-won
- Producers: Cirkut; Slatkin; Inverness

J-Hope singles chronology
"Mona Lisa" (2025)	"Killin' It Girl" (2025)	"Spaghetti" (2025)

GloRilla singles chronology
"Typa" (2025)	"Killin' It Girl" (2025)	"March" (2025)

Music video
- "Killin' It Girl" on YouTube

"Killin' It Girl" is a song by South Korean rapper J-Hope of BTS featuring American rapper GloRilla, released on June 13, 2025. It was produced by Cirkut, Blake Slatkin and Inverness.

== Background ==
J-Hope announced the song on May 28, 2025. He also released a concept film titled Charm of HOPE, which includes snippets of his last two singles "Sweet Dreams" and "Mona Lisa" and ends with an instrumental teaser for "Killin' It Girl". A solo version without GloRilla was released alongside the song.

In an interview with People, J-Hope described the song was "about an emotional rush and magnetic pull toward someone. So I'd love for it to feel bold, sensual, and have that kind of energy that makes you want to play the track on repeat." He added, "Lately, I've been especially drawn to artists whose powerful presence truly stands out. I was confident that GloRilla's presence on the track would bring exceptional synergy."

== Composition ==
The song begins with a "spare but propulsive" beat that builds toward the chorus, with a later addition of pop synths. The artists perform in a hip-hop flow. The lyrics depict J-Hope falling in love at first sight and detail his infatuation, while GloRilla plays the role of a confident seductress.

== Critical reception ==
Michael Saponara of Billboard gave a positive review, writing "j-hope delivers a fiery verse while crafting a seductive chorus and then Big Glo invades the minimalistic production with her gritty Memphis flow, making for a delectable clash."

== Music video ==
The music video was directed by Cody Critcheloe and released alongside the single. J-Hope and GloRilla filmed their parts in two different places, with a black cat serving as the connection between them.

== Track listing ==
- Digital download and streaming – single
1. "Killin' It Girl" (featuring GloRilla) – 2:28
2. "Killin' It Girl" (solo version) – 2:18
- CD – single
1. "Killin' It Girl" (solo version) – 2:18
- CD – instrumental
1. "Killin' It Girl" (solo version) – 2:18
2. "Killin' It Girl" (instrumental) – 2:18
- Digital download and streaming – remixes
1. "Killin' It Girl" (featuring GloRilla) – 2:28
2. "Killin' It Girl" (solo version) – 2:18
3. "Killin' It Girl" (featuring GloRilla; instrumental) – 2:28
4. "Killin' It Girl" (featuring GloRilla; clean version) – 2:28
5. "Killin' It Girl" (featuring GloRilla; band remix) – 2:29
6. "Killin' It Girl" (featuring GloRilla; boom bap remix) – 2:48
7. "Killin' It Girl" (featuring GloRilla; West Coast remix) – 2:41
8. "Killin' It Girl" (featuring GloRilla; soul remix) – 2:34
9. "Killin' It Girl" (featuring GloRilla; Brazilian phonk remix) – 2:39
10. "Killin' It Girl" (featuring GloRilla; electro pop remix) – 2:32

== Charts ==
Chart performance for "Killin' It Girl"
Chart (2025)	Peak position
Austria (Ö3 Austria Top 40)	72
Bolivia (Billboard)	4
Brazil Hot 100 (Billboard)	24
Canada Hot 100 (Billboard)	54
Central America Anglo Airplay (Monitor Latino)	13
Costa Rica Anglo Airplay (Monitor Latino)	6
France (SNEP)	177
Global 200 (Billboard)	3
Hong Kong (Billboard)	8
Indonesia (Billboard)	13
Japan Hot 100 (Billboard)	52
Guatemala Anglo Airplay (Monitor Latino)	2
Malaysia (IFPI)	7
Malaysia International (RIM)	2
Middle East and North Africa (IFPI)	10
New Zealand Hot Singles (RMNZ)	5
Peru (Billboard)	8
Peru Anglo Airplay (Monitor Latino)	16
Philippines Hot 100 (Billboard Philippines)	16
Portugal (AFP)	81
Russia Streaming (TopHit)	48
Russia Streaming (TopHit) Solo version	88
Saudi Arabia (IFPI)	16
Singapore (RIAS)	5
South Korea (Circle)	121
Suriname (Nationale Top 40)	17
Thailand (IFPI)	9
Taiwan (Billboard)	2
United Arab Emirates (IFPI)	15
UK Singles (Official Charts)	30
US Billboard Hot 100	40
Vietnam (IFPI)	7

== Release history ==
"Killin' It Girl" release history
Region	Date	Format	Version	Label	Ref.
Various	June 13, 2025	Digital download; streaming	Original; solo version	Big Hit	
Various	June 13, 2025	CD single	Solo version	Big Hit	
Various	June 13, 2025	CD single	Instrumental; solo version	Big Hit	
Various	June 17, 2025	Digital download; streaming	Remixes	Big Hit	
