= Hope on the Street Vol. 1 =

2024 special EP by J-Hope

EP / soundtrack by J-Hope
- Released: March 29, 2024
- Length: 19:50
- Languages: Korean; English
- Label: Big Hit
- Producers: Pdogg; Blake Slatkin; Nile Rodgers; Benny Blanco; Cashmere Cat; Dem Jointz

J-Hope chronology
Jack in the Box (2022)	Hope on the Street Vol. 1 (2024)

Singles from Hope on the Street Vol. 1
- 1. "On the Street" Released: March 3, 2023; 2. "Neuron" Released: March 29, 2024

Hope on the Street Vol. 1 (stylized in all caps) is the first soundtrack and extended play by South Korean rapper J-Hope of BTS, released on March 29, 2024, by Big Hit Music. It contains six tracks and features appearances by his bandmate Jungkook, record producers Benny Blanco and Nile Rodgers, Huh Yunjin of Le Sserafim, and rappers Jinbo, Gaeko, and Yoon Mi-rae.

The album is part of Hope on the Street, a project consisting of the six-part documentary series of the same title, released on March 28, 2024, and the EP which serves as the soundtrack, released the day after. According to Big Hit, it "continues the identity of the dance practice record series that he presented in 2015".

== Background and release ==
On July 15, 2022, J-Hope released his first studio album, Jack in the Box, as well as a documentary titled J-Hope in the Box, chronicling the making of J-Hope's debut album and his appearance at Lollapalooza.

On March 3, 2023, he released his single "On the Street" with the American rapper J. Cole, which was first announced on February 27, 2023, a day after Big Hit announced J-Hope's impending enlistment for his mandatory military service. On April 18, 2023, he became the second BTS band member to enlist.

On February 18, 2024, a documentary trailer for Hope on the Street was released, and it was also announced that a soundtrack to the documentary series is also planned to be released. The following day, the album artwork of the EP along the teaser poster for the documentary has been released. On the 26th, the tracklist for the EP was announced, and it includes the solo version of "On the Street" which was released a year prior.

On March 29, 2024, the EP was released along with the music video of the title track "Neuron" which features rapper Gaeko and Yoon Mi-rae.

== Critical reception ==
The album received favorable reviews from overseas media outlets. On a four-star review of Rhian Daly from NME, the album is described as a bright, brilliant and a tantalizing reminder of J-Hope's multi-faceted talents.

== Commercial performance ==
In Japan, the album also debuted at the top of Oricon's weekly digital album chart for the second time.

In the United States, Hope on the Street Vol. 1 entered the Billboard 200 at number five, marking J-Hope's highest entry on the chart and making him the first South Korean solo artist to have two top-ten albums. It was the second best-selling album of its release week (ending April 4, 2024), with 44,000 album equivalent units sold. This figure included 38,000 pure sales, 4,000 streaming equivalent album units, and 2,000 track equivalent album units.

== Track listing ==
Hope on the Street Vol. 1 track listing
No.	Title	Writer(s)	Producer(s)	Length
1.	"On the Street" (Solo Version)	J-Hope; Pdogg	Pdogg	3:11
2.	"I Wonder..." (with Jungkook of BTS)	J-Hope; Melanie Fontana; Michel "Lindgren" Schulz; Pdogg	Pdogg	2:43
3.	"Lock / Unlock" (with Benny Blanco and Nile Rodgers)	J-Hope; Blake Slatkin; Omer Fedi; Benny Blanco; Cashmere Cat; Michael Cleveland; Nile Rodgers; Pdogg	Pdogg; Slatkin; Rodgers; Blanco; Cashmere Cat	3:02
4.	"I Don't Know" (with Huh Yunjin of Le Sserafim)	J-Hope; Moon Sujin; Pdogg	Pdogg	3:03
5.	"What If..." (Dance Mix with Jinbo the Superfreak)	J-Hope; Dem Jointz; Jinbo the Superfreak; R. Diggs; R. Jones; Pdogg	Dem Jointz	3:16
6.	"Neuron" (with Gaeko and Yoon Mi-rae)	J-Hope; Gaeko; Pdogg; Yoon Mi-rae	Pdogg	4:33
Total length:				19:50

== Charts ==
=== Weekly charts ===
Weekly chart performance for Hope on the Street Vol. 1
Chart (2024–2025)	Peak position
Australian Albums (ARIA)	62
Austrian Albums (Ö3 Austria)	5
Belgian Albums (Ultratop Flanders)	51
Belgian Albums (Ultratop Wallonia)	4
Finnish Albums (Suomen virallinen lista)	38
French Albums (SNEP)	6
German Albums (Offizielle Top 100)	10
Italian Albums (FIMI)	30
Japanese Albums (Oricon)	45
Japanese Hot Albums (Billboard Japan)	2
New Zealand Albums (RMNZ)	29
Portuguese Albums (AFP)	26
Scottish Albums (Official Charts)	8
South Korean Albums (Circle)	2
Spanish Albums (Promusicae)	12
Swiss Albums (Schweizer Hitparade)	5
UK Albums (Official Charts)	38
US Billboard 200	5
US World Albums (Billboard)	1

=== Year-end charts ===
Year-end chart performance for Hope on the Street Vol. 1
Chart (2024)	Position
South Korean Albums (Circle)	53
