= Sweet Dreams (J-Hope song) =

Single by J-Hope featuring Miguel
- Released: March 7, 2025
- Genre: Pop; R&B
- Length: 2:52
- Label: Big Hit
- Songwriters: Jung Ho-seok; Johnny Goldstein; Sean Douglas; Sam Martin; Theron Thomas
- Producer: Goldstein

J-Hope singles chronology
"LV Bag" (2025)	"Sweet Dreams" (2025)	"Mona Lisa" (2025)

Miguel singles chronology
"Always Time" (2024)	"Sweet Dreams" (2025)	"Negotiate" (2025)

Music video
- "Sweet Dreams" on YouTube

"Sweet Dreams" is a song by South Korean rapper J-Hope of BTS featuring American singer Miguel, released on March 7, 2025. It was written by J-Hope, Johnny Goldstein (who also produced the song), Sean Douglas, Sam Martin and Theron Thomas.

== Background ==
On February 26, 2025, J-Hope announced the song and shared the cover art as well. "Sweet Dreams" is his first solo release since he was discharged from the South Korean military in October 2024.

== Composition ==
"Sweet Dreams" is a pop and R&B song that also fuses hip-hop. Over twinkling synths and percussion, it finds J-Hope and Miguel singing about their "desire to love and be loved". The song opens with Miguel delivering the refrain in his signature falsetto ("Sweet dreams come after hours / Nothing that's not allowed / You should never sleep alone / 'Cause I'll always take you home"), before J-Hope enters in the chorus, "I just wanna love ya like love ya like love ya like that". J-Hope gives a melodic performance.

== Music video ==
An official music video premiered alongside the single. It sees J-Hope waking up in a house floating into the sky, walking through a vibrant neighborhood and watching the fantastic qualities around him in awe. The clip also shows dancing dogs and J-Hope riding a flying car. Miguel makes a brief cameo in the video.

== Accolades ==
Accolades
Award/Organization	Year	Category	Result	Ref.
iHeartRadio Music Award	2026	Favorite K-Pop Collaboration	Won	
The Fact Music Awards	2025	Best Music - Spring	Won	

== Live performances ==
J-Hope and Miguel performed the song on The Tonight Show Starring Jimmy Fallon on March 11, 2025.

== Track listing ==
- CD, digital download and streaming
1. "Sweet Dreams" (featuring Miguel) – 2:52
- CD – instrumental
1. "Sweet Dreams" (featuring Miguel; instrumental) – 2:47
2. "Sweet Dreams" (featuring Miguel) – 2:52
- Digital download and streaming – zzZ remixes
1. "Sweet Dreams" (featuring Miguel) – 2:52
2. "Sweet Dreams" (featuring Miguel; instrumental) – 2:47
3. "Sweet Dreams" (featuring Miguel; band remix) – 3:16
4. "Sweet Dreams" (featuring Miguel; Johnny Gold remix) – 3:16
5. "Sweet Dreams" (featuring Miguel; sped up) – 2:29
6. "Sweet Dreams" (featuring Miguel; slowed down) – 3:25
- Digital download and streaming – FnZ remix
1. "Sweet Dreams" (featuring Miguel; FnZ remix) – 3:06

== Charts ==
=== Weekly charts ===
Weekly chart performance for "Sweet Dreams"
Chart (2025–2026)	Peak position
Bolivia Anglo Airplay (Monitor Latino)	3
Brazil Hot 100 (Billboard)	60
Canada Hot 100 (Billboard)	79
Chile Anglo Airplay (Monitor Latino)	6
CIS Airplay (TopHit)	32
Dominican Republic Anglo Airplay (Monitor Latino)	7
Global 200 (Billboard)	16
Honduras Anglo Airplay (Monitor Latino)	7
Japan Hot 100 (Billboard)	84
Japan Digital Singles (Oricon)	7
Kazakhstan Airplay (TopHit)	27
Malaysia International (RIM)	19
New Zealand Hot Singles (RMNZ)	8
Peru Anglo Airplay (Monitor Latino)	8
Philippines Hot 100 (Billboard Philippines)	38
Russia Airplay (TopHit)	23
Singapore (RIAS)	21
South Korea (Circle)	49
Taiwan (Billboard)	19
UK Singles (Official Charts)	42
UK Hip Hop/R&B (Official Charts)	12
UK Indie (Official Charts)	10
US Billboard Hot 100	66
Vietnam (IFPI)	17

=== Monthly charts ===
Monthly chart performance for "Sweet Dreams"
Chart (2025)	Position
CIS Airplay (TopHit)	40
Kazakhstan Airplay (TopHit)	41
Russia Airplay (TopHit)	27
South Korea (Circle)	71

== Release history ==
"Sweet Dreams" release history
Region	Date	Format	Version	Label	Ref.
Various	March 7, 2025	CD single; digital download; streaming	Original	Big Hit	
Various	March 7, 2025	CD single	Instrumental	Big Hit	
Various	March 11, 2025	Digital download; streaming	zzZ remixes	Big Hit	
Various	March 18, 2025	Digital download; streaming	FnZ remix	Big Hit	
