= More (J-Hope song) =

Single by J-Hope

from the album Jack in the Box
- Language: Korean
- Released: July 1, 2022
- Genre: Rap rock
- Length: 3:00
- Label: Big Hit
- Songwriters: J-Hope; Ivan Jackson Rosenberg
- Producer: Brasstracks

J-Hope singles chronology
"Chicken Noodle Soup" (2019)	"More" (2022)	"Arson" (2022)

Music video
- "More" on YouTube

"More" is a song recorded by South Korean rapper J-Hope of BTS for his debut album Jack in the Box. It was released on July 1, 2022, as the album's lead single by Big Hit Music.

== Charts ==
Chart performance for "More"
Chart (2022)	Peak position
Canada Hot 100 (Billboard)	75
Global 200 (Billboard)	15
India International Singles (IMI)	6
Ireland (IRMA)	75
Japan Digital Singles (Oricon)	21
New Zealand Hot Singles (RMNZ)	6
Philippines (Billboard)	20
South Korea (Circle)	98
UK Singles (OCC)	70
US Billboard Hot 100	82
US World Digital Song Sales (Billboard)	1

== Release history ==
Release dates and formats for "More"
Region	Date	Format(s)	Label
Various	July 1, 2022	Digital download; streaming	Big Hit
