= Jack in the Box (album) =

2022 studio album by J-Hope

- Digital and vinyl cover

Studio album by J-Hope
- Released: July 15, 2022
- Recorded: 2020–2022
- Genre: Old-school hip-hop
- Length: 21:42
- Languages: Korean; English
- Label: Big Hit
- Producers: Evan; Ghstloop; Brasstracks; Clams Casino; Scoop DeVille; Pdogg; Dem Jointz

J-Hope chronology
Hope World (2018)	Jack in the Box (2022)	Hope on the Street Vol. 1 (2024)

Singles from Jack in the Box
- 1. "More" Released: July 1, 2022; 2. "Arson" Released: July 15, 2022

Jack in the Box is the debut studio album of South Korean rapper J-Hope of BTS, released on July 15, 2022, through Big Hit Music. It contains 10 tracks, including the lead single, "More", which preceded it on July 1, and the follow-up single, "Arson", which was released the same day as the album, together with an accompanying music video. A concept album revolving around the story of Pandora's box, Jack in the Box discusses themes of passion, ambition, humanity, insecurity, success, and anxiety about the future. Primarily an old-school hip-hop-influenced record, the album features a blend of genres, including pop, grunge, and R&B.

Originally only available as a digital album, Jack in the Box charted in 17 territories, including Australia, Canada, France, Germany, New Zealand, Spain, and the United Kingdom. It debuted at number 3 in South Korea, number 11 in Japan, and number 17 on the Billboard 200 in the United States. The album sold over 470,000 copies in its release week and was certified platinum by the Korea Music Content Association (KMCA). A limited edition vinyl version was released in December 2022. The album was made available on traditional CD format in 2023, with five additional tracks included.

== Background and recording ==
J-Hope released his first solo mixtape, Hope World, on March 2, 2018. It peaked at number 38 on the US Billboard 200 and made him the highest-charting Korean soloist on the ranking at the time. He did not release any new music for some time after that, citing disappointment with the mixtape as a reason during a livestream in January 2019. He further elaborated that a lack of confidence in his skills as a musician, especially in comparison to that of his bandmates, made him feel unprepared and hesitant to try collaborating with other artists. Despite these insecurities, the rapper also expressed feeling motivated by his bandmates' successes "to write great songs and want to work with great artists". The trilingual "Chicken Noodle Soup" single, featuring American singer Becky G, followed in the latter part of the year. No further releases were forthcoming. Speaking to Rolling Stone in 2021 about the likelihood of a second mixtape, J-Hope disclosed that he had been working on his music continuously, but nothing was decided as yet. His goal at present was "to get inspired and make good music." He added that Hope World's creation had greatly influenced his progression as a musician and artist since 2018, and while his style would not change much, it would be more mature.

Recording sessions and mixing for the album took place at Hope World, The Rock Pit, Dogg Bounce and HYBE Studio in South Korea; Miss Lana Media and BC Mix in Los Angeles; The One With The Big Bulb; Sky Movement Studios in Barbados; Katalyst Studios in New York City; and Larrabee Sound Studios in North Hollywood.

== Music and lyrical content ==
Jack in the Box represents J-Hope's "own musical personality and vision as an artist" and his "aspirations to break the mold and grow further". In an interview for Weverse Magazine published in June 2022, the rapper divulged his desire to showcase a "different side of me...an extremely dark, raw side" in his current projects, in contrast to the "sunny demeanor" he often displays. He further elaborated that he "wanted to show I have things I want to say, but I kept feeling like, if I did them in the same style I always have, they wouldn't come across well. If I was going to convey the things I wanted to say, I would have to be darker. It's something I’ve never done before, so I was excited to try something new. I was heavily influenced by what my heart was telling me, and that's why I decided to give it a try."

A concept album based on the Greek tale of Pandora's box, Jack in the Box opens with "Intro", a female-narrated reading of the story from which J-Hope's stagename is derived. The existential "Pandora's Box", about the rapper's life as an idol, follows next. In it, he speaks about "serving others over himself"—the song's lyrics, "Someone's light, someone's smile/ Someone's hope, my activities are someone's life", "highlight the weight of his responsibility to his fans"—and questions his own perspectives. The third track "More" is about J-Hope's "passion, bold ambition, and greed" to "show the world how much he has grown", taking risks, and "a certain vital recklessness." A 90s-inspired, "swag-filled" song with a "grungy rock 'n roll vibe" that features a "darker, edgier sound" in comparison to his previous releases, the track is a fusion of old-school hip-hop and arena/alt-rock. It showcases the rapper's "unique rhythmic flow" and utilizes "scream-singing". The tenth track "Arson", is an introspective about him "encounter[ing] 'the world outside the box" while stuck at a crossroads and deciding which path to take next. Described in a press release as one of the main songs—together with "More"—that conveys the core message of Jack in the Box, it serves as the album's closing track.

== Release ==
On June 14, 2022, during the YouTube premiere of BTS' ninth anniversary dinner, RM revealed that the members would be devoting more attention to individual music endeavors going forward. Future projects would be released as commercial albums, complete with promotional activities, instead of as free or unpromoted mixtapes. Immediately afterwards, Hybe Corporation officially announced J-Hope as the first member to begin promoting as a solo artist. A subsequent Weverse notice dated June 25, publicized the upcoming release of his debut album, Jack In the Box, scheduled for July 15. It would be preceded by a then-unnamed single on July 1. J-Hope shared a short video clip of "a white J in the center of the screen, with a colorful checkered background" on his Instagram account, with the caption "'J'ack in the box", in honor of the album's announcement. On June 27, he posted a set of concept images for the album's cover art, featuring various Pierrot motifs. The first showed "a bird's eye view photo of him standing in a teal box" wearing a white suit and black Jester's hat "as he presses one finger to his lips", followed by four other photos of him in different poses inside the box. Preorders for the album began online and at in-person retailers that same day.

An "eerie" 23-second-long visualizer, titled Hope In The Box, of a jack-in-the-box cranking itself to the tune of a "somewhat sinister melody", was released on July 5. When the "Jack"-figure springs out, a static-filled television screen in the background begins flashing with similarly-themed graphics and words. J-Hope uploaded the clip to Instagram, with the caption "Are you just going to stay in the box?" and the hashtag "#HopeInTheBox". Two days later, the album's complete 10-song tracklist was unveiled, via a graphic video on YouTube that listed out the tracks using "3D designs".

=== Format ===
Hybe forwent releasing Jack in the Box on CD. Statements from the company explained that the decision was part of its efforts to reduce plastic waste, especially in relation to album production, and be more eco-friendly. The album was made available digitally only, via various streaming platforms and music sites, as well as Hybe's own Weverse Albums music app. Though not packaged in a traditional format, some physical components are included: a card holder, two photocards, and a scannable User Guide QR card to access the album and additional digital content on Weverse Albums.

A limited edition vinyl of the album was released on December 12, 2022. It includes a booklet, lyric sheet, folded poster, and photocard. The preorder period for the vinyl opened on Weverse and at other online retailers on August 8. A CD version of the album, the HOPE Edition, comprising the same tracklist as the original release plus five new tracks: three live songs from J-Hope's Lollapalooza performance and two instrumentals, was released on August 18, 2023. Four collectible editions were made available, including Target and Walmart exclusive versions.

=== Singles ===
"More" was the first single released from the album. J-Hope shared two sets of related concept images, also containing Pierrot motifs, via Instagram on June 27 and 28, 2022. The photos from the 27th depicted the rapper "in dark, smoky makeup" "standing alone in a slanted hallway" and wearing "a floppy black jester's hat [while] staring into the bright-flash camera from different spots". Simply captioned "MORE ?", Big Hit Music confirmed this as the single's title in the text of the label's own posts of the concept images uploaded to its social media that same day. The photos posted on the 28th featured J-Hope dressed in all white and surrounded by people with disfigured faces. A 15-second video teaser, of a "silver key with the song's title etched into its face" backed by a percussive "'90s-inspired beat", containing a preview of the song's lyrics—the rapper is heard shouting the line "'Cause I want some more!'" at the end—followed on June 29. An accompanying music video premiered simultaneously on YouTube in conjunction with the single's global digital release on July 1. Critics positively highlighted "More"'s noticeable aural and visual departure from the brighter sounds and more vibrant imagery J-Hope had been known for up to that point, and the "thunderous" expression of the rapper's "shocking and theatrical new vision". The single became his second solo entry on the Billboard Hot 100 in the United States, after 2019's "Chicken Noodle Soup", debuting at number 82 with 4.6 million cumulative streams and 12,000 copies sold—it was the second best-selling digital song in the country—during the tracking period dated July 1–7, 2022. "More" also earned J-Hope his third number-one on the genre-specific World Digital Song Sales chart and he topped the Emerging Artists chart for the first time. Dazed ranked the song as the 15th best K-pop track of 2022 on its year-end list published in December, with Taylor Glasby writing that J-hope "bares his inner workings in 'More'" having "created a new lens through which to view him": as "a man whose creativity refuses to be tamed." J-Hope later released a dance practice video, complete with choreography, for his stage performance of the song at the 2022 MAMA Awards.

"Arson" was revealed as the second single from the album, after J-Hope posted a silent video of himself on July 7 sitting before a black box with the word "ARSON" written on the front. Actually a candle, he stares into the camera after lighting it then covers the top of the box, snuffing the flame out. Concept photos for the single followed on July 10 and 11, and showed the rapper dressed in a white jumpsuit posing next to a wrecked, burning car, and then with his clothing charred. A 30-second teaser for the single's music video was shared via YouTube on the 13th. Directed by Lee Suho, the clip features a car exploding into fire in slow motion while J-Hope is heard saying "'let's burn … it's done'" before briefly rapping in Korean and then name-dropping the song's title, all over a "shuffling beat". The single's release date—the same day as the album—appeared at the end. J-Hope earned his third solo entry on the US Hot 100, at number 96, with "Arson", and his fourth number-one debut on the World Digital Song Sales chart.

Both singles were later nominated in the Global Digital Music – July category at the 12th Circle Chart Music Awards.

== Promotion ==
On July 13, 2022, W Korea announced J-Hope as the cover for the magazine's August issue—three versions were released. The magazine contained a full spread pictorial and an in-depth interview with the rapper about his music and Jack in the Box. He also discussed the album with Rolling Stone, Variety, and Consequence in articles published on July 15. J-Hope held a private listening party for the album at the Hybe headquarters in Yongsan on July 14. Attendees included BTS-bandmates Jin, RM, Jimin, V, and Jungkook, Hybe chairman Bang Si-hyuk, and several of the rapper's close friends and artists in the dance and music industries such as Tiger JK, Yoon Mi-rae, Uhm Jung-hwa, Heize, Jessi, Hyuna, Sunmi, Simon Dominic, Loco, and Sokodomo. Clips of the event were shared online by multiple attendees. On July 28, J-Hope appeared as a guest on the 14th episode of IU's Palette, a YouTube series hosted by singer IU. He performed "Equal Sign", as a duet with IU, and "Safety Zone" for the first time on the show. The rapper made his solo performance debut at Lollapalooza on July 31, as the headlining act for the final day of the event, and became the first South Korean artist to headline a main stage at a major United States music festival—the hour-long setlist included several songs from the album. In November, J-Hope headlined day two of the MAMA Awards in Japan, performing a medley of "More", "Arson", and "Future". The following month, he joined the performance lineup for Dick Clark's New Year's Rockin' Eve, held on December 31, and sang a medley comprising "= (Equal Sign)", "Chicken Noodle Soup", and the Holiday Remix version of "Butter" by BTS.

A documentary chronicling the album's making and J-Hope's performance at Lollapalooza, titled J-Hope in the Box, was released for streaming globally on Weverse and Disney+ beginning February 17, 2023.

== Critical reception ==
Professional ratings
Aggregate scores
Source	Rating
Metacritic	87/100
Review scores
Source	Rating
AllMusic	4/5 stars
Clash	7/10
Consequence	B+
Evening Standard	3/5 stars
NME	5/5 stars
Rolling Stone	4/5 stars
The Line of Best Fit	4/5 stars

At Metacritic, which assigns a normalized rating out of 100 to reviews from professional publications, Jack in the Box received an average score of 87 based on six reviews, indicating "universal acclaim". In a 5-star review for NME, Rhian Daly wrote that the album was "smartly presented with a clearly signposted narrative" and "flows in a way that makes it a treat to enjoy from start to finish rather than dipping into songs at random." She described it as "thought-provoking and full of fresh new flavour", noting that while "J-Hope might have taken off his bright, optimistic mask...to show another dimension of his character [...] those qualities [...] still creep in here in places, pushing forward his empathetic, sincere messages with glimmers of positivity. Clash's Abbie Aitken complimented J-Hope's "experiment[ation] with genres not normally associated with his artistry", describing the change as "refreshing" and "resulting in a second album that completely juxtaposes his previous sound." In sentiments similar to Daly's, she also noticed "glimpses of the radiancy often associated with [the rapper]" surfacing throughout the album "despite an extremely darkened start". The Evening Standard's Jochan Embley described the album as "a solid start", impressed with the constant changeup of J-Hope's vocal delivery and the "almost imperceptibl[e]" switching between Korean and English, but felt that the overall shortness of the record made it come across "more like a proof of concept than a fully realised album." He singled out "Equal Sign" and "Safety Zone" as the "rays of light" countering "the gloomier pits" of the rapper's personality in "the rest of the album's darkness."

== Commercial performance ==
Jack in the Box debuted at number three in South Korea, on the week 31 issue—for the period dated July 24–30, 2022—of the Circle Album Chart and subsequently ranked at number eight on the monthly album chart for July, having sold 472,385 cumulative copies. A further 9,614 copies were sold in August, and the album was awarded Platinum certification by the Korea Music Content Association (KMCA) in September.

In Japan, with only three days of availability, Jack in the Box debuted at number two on Oricon's weekly Digital Albums Chart for the period dated July 11–17, 2022, selling 2,439 copies within that time. It also entered the corresponding issue of the Billboard Japan Hot Albums chart at number 11, and was the best-selling digital album of the week, topping the component Download Albums chart with 2,425 sales.

The album also earned J-Hope entries on several Billboard charts in the United States. It debuted at number 17 on the Billboard 200 chart issue dated July 30 (for the tracking week ending July 21) with 25,000 units sold, his second and highest entry on the ranking—Hope World previously peaked at number 38 in 2018. Of that figure, the album sold 10,000 digital copies and was the fifth best-selling release of the week. J-Hope also re-entered the Artist 100, at a new peak of number nine. Following the global release of the vinyl version, the album entered Billboard's Vinyl Albums chart at number eight, on the issue dated January 28, 2023. It reentered the February 11 issue of the chart, at a new peak of number four, following the vinyl's release in the US. The HOPE Edition version of the album, released in August 2023, earned 50,000 album-equivalent units during the week ending August 24 and reentered the Billboard 200 (issue dated September 2) at number six. This figure comprised 47,000 pure sales; 2,000 stream-equivalent album units (2.99 million on-demand official streams); and 1,000 track-equivalent album units.

== Accolades ==
Rolling Stone included Jack in the Box on its year-end list of the 100 Best Albums of 2022 at number nine, describing it as a "growly, endlessly creative debut" that "set the bar high", while NME listed the album at number 42 on its ranking of the 50 best albums of 2022, writing that it "takes the J-Hope the world has come to know and love over the last nine years and sets that figure alight. From the ashes, though, comes a star more thrilling and formidable than ever." In September 2023, Paste magazine ranked Jack in the Box as the second-greatest K-pop album of all time on the publication's list of the 30 Greatest K-Pop Albums of All Time.

The album was nominated in the respective Bonsang categories at the 37th Golden Disc Awards and 32nd Seoul Music Awards, but did not win.

== Track listing ==
Jack in the Box track listing
No.	Title	Writer(s)	Producer(s)	Length
1.	"Intro"	Evan	Evan	0:58
2.	"Pandora's Box"	J-Hope; Ghstloop; Supreme Boi	Ghstloop	2:36
3.	"More"	J-Hope; Ivan Jackson Rosenberg	Brasstracks	3:00
4.	"Stop" (Korean: 세상에 나쁜 사람은 없다; RR: Sesange Nappeun Sarameun Opda; lit. '"There Are No Bad People in the World"')	J-Hope; Michael Volpe	Clams Casino	2:02
5.	"=" (Equal Sign)	J-Hope; Scoop DeVille; Melanie Joy Fontana; Lindgren	Scoop DeVille	1:54
6.	"Music Box: Reflection"	Pdogg	Pdogg	1:10
7.	"What If..."	J-Hope; Dwayne Abernathy Jr.; R. Jones; R. Diggs	Dem Jointz	2:16
8.	"Safety Zone"	J-Hope; Pdogg	Pdogg	2:45
9.	"Future"	J-Hope; Rosenberg; Mich Conwell	Brasstracks	2:19
10.	"Arson" (Korean: 방화; RR: Banghwa)	J-Hope; Volpe	Clams Casino	2:39

Hope Edition CD bonus tracks
No.	Title	Length
11.	"Equal Sign" (Lollapalooza version)	2:08
12.	"Stop" (Lollapalooza version)	2:16
13.	"Future" (Lollapalooza version)	4:19
14.	"More" (Instrumental)	2:59
15.	"Arson" (Instrumental)	2:40
Total length:		36:02

Notes

- "What If..." samples "Shimmy Shimmy Ya" by Ol Dirty Bastard of the Wu-Tang Clan

== Personnel ==
Excludes songwriting and production credits already listed above. Adapted from QQ Music.

- Bobby Campbell – mix engineering (track 7)
- Rick Carter – sample voiceover (track 4)
- Tim Chantarangsu – sample voiceover (track 4)
- Dem Jointz – instrumentation (track 7), keyboard (track 7), synthesizer (track 7)
- Evan – keyboard (track 1), synthesizer (track 1), digital editing (track 1, 7)
- Fatherdude – vocal sample (track 9)
- Melanie "Joy" Fontana – background vocals (track 5)
- Ghstloop – keyboard (track 2), synthesizer (track 2), digital editing (tracks 2–5, 7, 10)
- J-Hope – rap arrangement (tracks 2–5, 7–10), record engineering (tracks 2–5, 7–10), vocal arrangement (track 5)
- Ivan Jackson – instrumentation (track 9)
- Jaycen Joshua – mix engineering (track 3)
- Jung Woo-young – mix engineering (track 4)
- Jaicko Lawrence – background vocals (track 8), record engineering (track 8)
- Lee Yeon-soo – digital editing (track 1)
- Ken Lewis – mix engineering (tracks 2, 8, 10)
  - Jonathon Garcia – assistant (tracks 2, 8, 10)
- Lindgren – record engineering (track 5)
- Rachanee Lumanayo – narration (track 1), record engineering (track 1)
- Park Jin-se – mix engineering (track 6)
- Pdogg – drum production (track 3), guitar (track 3), keyboard (tracks 6–8), synthesizer (track 6, 8), digital editing (tracks 8, 9), additional production (track 9), record engineering (track 9)
- Summergal – digital editing (tracks 4, 5, 10)
- Supreme Boi – rap arrangement (tracks 2, 3, 10), record engineering (track 3, 10)
- Yang Ga – mix engineering (tracks 5, 9)
- Yeonum Children's Choir (Jeong Ji-woo, Lee Hyo-joo, Cho Yong-chan) – chorus (track 9)

== Charts ==
=== Weekly charts ===
Weekly chart performance for Jack in the Box
Chart (2022–2023)	Peak position
Australian Albums (ARIA)	27
Austrian Albums (Ö3 Austria)	18
Belgian Albums (Ultratop Flanders)	36
Belgian Albums (Ultratop Wallonia)	3
Canadian Albums (Billboard)	43
Finnish Albums (Suomen virallinen lista)	3
French Albums (SNEP)	7
German Albums (Offizielle Top 100)	29
Hungarian Physical Albums (MAHASZ)	3
Italian Albums (FIMI)	93
Japanese Albums (Oricon)	2
Japanese Combined Albums (Oricon)	3
Japanese Hot Albums (Billboard Japan)	2
Lithuanian Albums (AGATA)	3
New Zealand Albums (RMNZ)	30
Polish Albums (ZPAV)	2
Portuguese Albums (AFP)	6
South Korean Albums (Circle)	2
Spanish Albums (Promusicae)	32
Swedish Physical Albums (Sverigetopplistan)	4
Swiss Albums (Schweizer Hitparade)	12
UK Albums (Official Charts)	67
UK Independent Albums (Official Charts)	11
US Billboard 200	6
US Top Rap Albums (Billboard)	4
US World Albums (Billboard)	1

=== Monthly charts ===
Monthly chart performance for Jack in the Box
Chart (2022–2023)	Peak position
Japanese Albums (Oricon)	10
South Korean Albums (Circle)	8

=== Year-end charts ===
2022 year-end chart performance for Jack in the Box
Chart (2022)	Position
Japanese Hot Albums (Billboard Japan)	79
South Korean Albums (Circle)	37

2023 year-end chart performance for Jack in the Box
Chart (2023)	Position
South Korean Albums (Circle)	44

== Certifications and sales ==
Certifications and sales for Jack in the Box
Region	Certification	Certified units/sales
Japan	—	5,864
South Korea (KMCA)	Platinum	543,349
South Korea (KMCA) Hope Edition	2× Platinum	580,428
United States	—	25,000

== Release history ==
Jack in the Box release history
Region	Date	Format	Label	Ref.
Various	July 15, 2022	Digital download; streaming	Big Hit Music	
Various	July 29, 2022	Weverse album	Big Hit Music	
Japan	August 3, 2022	Weverse album	Big Hit Music	
United States	August 8, 2022	Weverse album	Big Hit Music	
United States	December 12, 2022	LP (Limited Edition)	Big Hit Music	
Japan	December 14, 2022	LP (Limited Edition)	Big Hit Music	
Various	August 18, 2023	CD	Big Hit Music	

== See also ==
- List of best-selling albums in South Korea
