= Artist 100 =

Chart published weekly by Billboard

The Artist 100 is a chart published weekly by Billboard in the United States. The Billboard Artist 100 combines performance across the Hot 100 chart, the Billboard 200 album chart, and the Internet-centric Social 50 chart.

The Artist 100 chart premiered in the issue dated July 19, 2014, with Trey Songz ranked number one.

== Chart achievements ==
=== Most weeks at number one ===
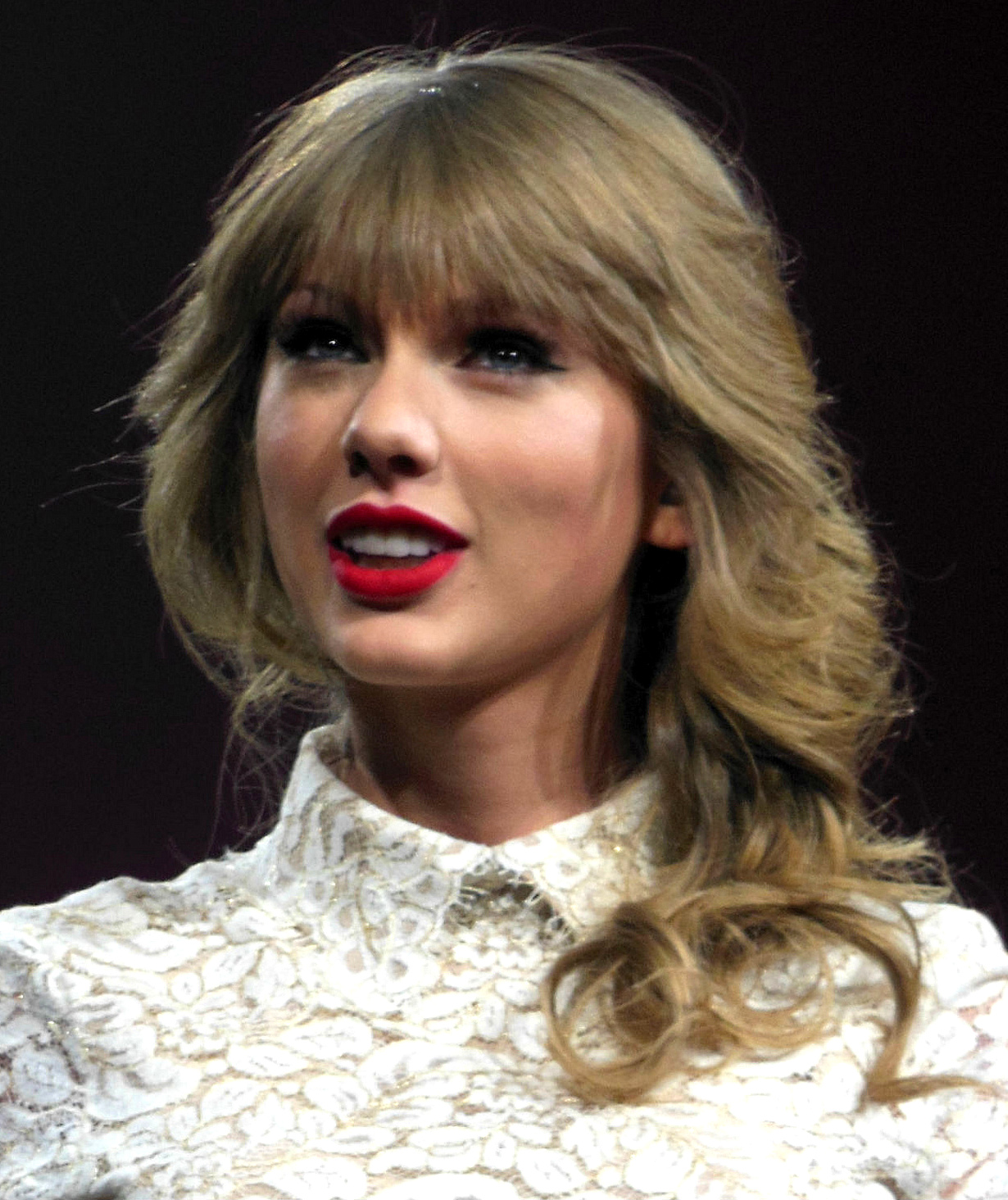
Taylor Swift spent the most weeks at number one on the Artist 100 chart.

Top 10 artists with the most weeks at number one on the Billboard Artist 100
Total weeks at No. 1	Artist	First week at No. 1	Ref.
137	Taylor Swift	September 6, 2014	
45	Morgan Wallen	January 23, 2021	
42	Drake	February 28, 2015	
29	The Weeknd	August 1, 2015	
24	BTS	June 2, 2018	
20	Adele	November 14, 2015	
17	Ariana Grande	August 30, 2014	
15	Ed Sheeran	September 5, 2015	
15	Post Malone	May 12, 2018	
14	Justin Bieber	November 28, 2015	
As of June 22, 2026

=== Most weeks charting ===
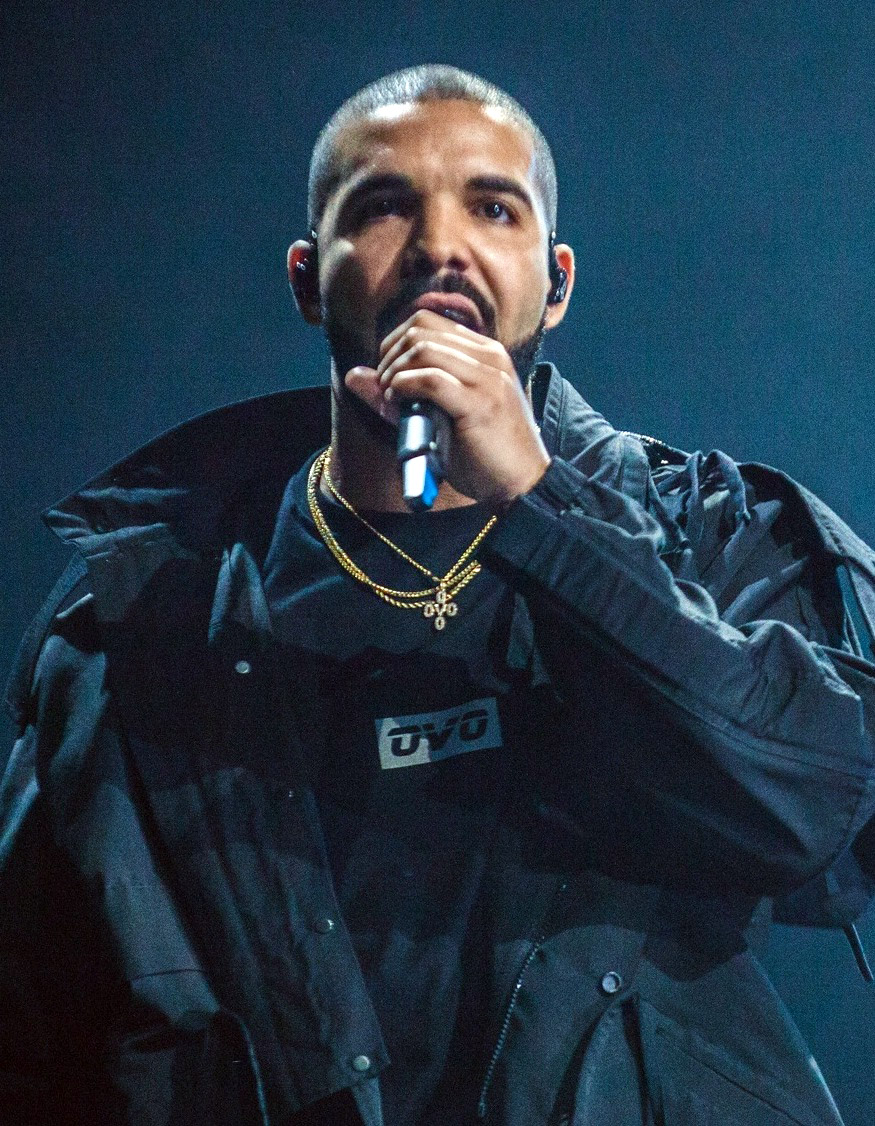
Drake spent more weeks on the Artist 100 chart than any other artist.

Top 10 artists with the most weeks charting on the Billboard Artist 100
Total weeks	Artist	Debut week	Ref.
622	Drake	July 19, 2014	
620	Taylor Swift	July 19, 2014	
613	Ed Sheeran	July 19, 2014	
602	Bruno Mars	July 19, 2014	
570	The Weeknd	November 1, 2014	
555	Chris Stapleton	May 23, 2015	
550	Metallica	April 25, 2015	
547	Ariana Grande	July 19, 2014	
545	Kendrick Lamar	October 11, 2014	
540	Eminem	July 19, 2014	
As of June 22, 2026

== See also ==
- List of Billboard Artist 100 number one artists of 2024
