= Hope World =

Mixtape by J-Hope
- Released: March 2, 2018
- Recorded: 2015–2018
- Studio: Big Hit (Seoul)
- Genres: K-pop; hip hop
- Length: 20:20
- Language: Korean
- Label: Big Hit
- Producers: Pdogg (exec.); J-Hope (exec.); Supreme Boi (co.); Dockskim (co.); Hiss Noise (co.); Adora (co.)

J-Hope chronology
Hope World (2018)	Jack in the Box (2022)

Singles from Hope World
- 1. "Daydream" Released: March 2, 2018; 2. "Airplane" Released: March 9, 2018

Hope World is the debut mixtape of South Korean rapper J-Hope of BTS. It was released on March 2, 2018, through label Big Hit Entertainment, along with the lead single "Daydream". A second single titled "Airplane" was released a week later. The album's peak at 38 on the Billboard 200 caused J-Hope to become the highest charting Korean soloist at the time of release.

== Background and release ==
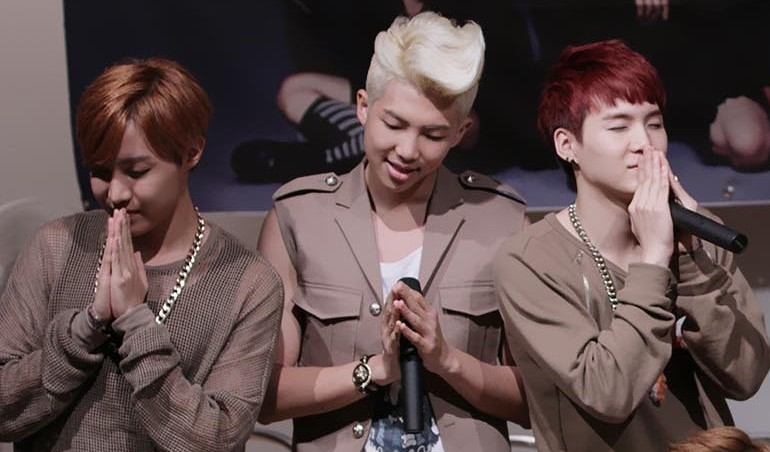
J-Hope pictured with fellow BTS rappers RM (middle) and Suga (right) in September 2014. He cites the two as reasons why he enjoys music.

Prior to launching his rap career, J-Hope was a member of the underground dance team Neuron, and was subsequently well known as a competitive street dancer. This eventually led him to audition as a k-pop idol trainee, where he was discovered by Big Hit Entertainment CEO Bang Si-hyuk. J-Hope trained under Big Hit Entertainment for three years alongside members RM and Suga before making his debut as a member of BTS in 2013. Joining BTS as a dancer with no prior rap or music production experience, J-Hope initially did not care for music and found his eventual interest in songwriting and production surprising. He cited his experience coming to Big Hit as an idol trainee as a major cause behind his eventual interest. In a broadcast for Naver's V Live, he explained that "I came to Seoul [as a dancer] and met many friends who could rap, like RM, Suga, and [Big Hit Entertainment producer] Supreme Boi, and learned so much from those friends... I think that's how I learned to really love music". Largely due to this inexperience, J-Hope felt that, since BTS' debut, he had been nervous about sharing his music publicly. The release of Hope World, however, felt like a "new beginning".

The first mention of a potential mixtape by J-Hope came in a concept book paired with the BTS album Wings, released on October 16, 2016. In an interview portion of the booklet, he was asked if he had any intention of releasing his own mixtape as the other rappers in BTS had done prior. He stated that he was "thinking about it". J-Hope later cited this interest in his solo work, as well as general praise for music he produced, as a major motivation for the creation of Hope World, labeling it "stimulating". The mixtape is intended to serve as an introduction to the rapper, and his musical style, as well as a culmination of his musical skills up to the point of release. On a personal level, he intended it to express the candid emotions he felt during his time as a producer:

The reason I made the mixtape was because it was kind of like a dream for me... to make and play a song that I made about myself. I wanted to play it for many people. And for the longest time, I worked on it and invested in that dream, and I studied a lot and wrote songs, researched to make it happen so I could figure out a way that many fans and the public who don't know about J-Hope can all enjoy my music. So first and foremost the reason why I made [Hope World] was because I wanted it so badly.

In 2017, J-Hope revealed that the mixtape had begun production, and that he planned to release it only when he felt it was ready. On January 3, 2018, RM mentioned the mixtape in a broadcast for V Live, mentioning that J-Hope had been working on its production, stating that he was "really surprised" by its quality and told fans to look forward to it. In February, J-Hope teased the mixtape in post directed to fans on BTS' Daum portal, writing that "[the mixtape] is soon. Real soon". Following this, he hosted his own V Live broadcast on February 18, reaffirming that the mixtape would be released "soon", but no date was given. Later, on February 28, J-Hope posted various clips of him working on the mixtape to the BTS Twitter page with the text "Hope World". The mixtape's release date was eventually announced through Big Hit Entertainment on February 23. After the announcement, J-Hope posted teaser videos of the mixtape's production.

On February 23, 2018, Big Hit Entertainment announced the release of J-Hope's debut mixtape set for March 2 via a press release. On March 2, 2018, Hope World was released for digital purchase and streaming and for free via links on BTS' Twitter in conjunction with a music video for "Daydream". J-Hope released a follow-up music video for "Airplane" on March 7. Aside from interviewing for Time, J-Hope did not further promote the mixtape.

For Hope World's three-year anniversary, J-Hope released a full, three-minute long version of its closing track "Blue Side (Outro)" on March 1, 2021—it was uploaded to the BTS SoundCloud page for free.

== Development and music ==
Inspired by Jules Verne's 1870 novel Twenty Thousand Leagues Under the Seas which captivated J-Hope as a child, the groovy track "Hope World" opened the mixtape with the sound of someone submerging, serving as "an introduction to people who are brand new to [him] with [him] as Captain Nemo showing [listeners] around just as the submarine in the book cruised around the world's oceans." The following track "P.O.P (Piece of Peace) Pt. 1" embodied J-Hope's name and wish to "become...hope for someone in the world — not even some grandiose peace but just a small shard of it." In the 90s-vibing "Daydream" with its lazy vocals and bouncing bass line, J-Hope desired to emphasize "the ordinary guy named Jung Ho-seok" behind J-Hope's public persona and used the track as "an outlet to talk about the desires and wishes that every person in the world has but [he has] to hold down and cover up." Flexing over scratch sounds in the trap "Base Line", J-Hope revealed how he started in music and his gratitude for his life and work, leading into the track "Hangsang" where he playfully flaunted his success and his camaraderie with his bandmates. Inspired by an airplane flight in first-class where "it dawned on [him] that [he] was...in the seat and living the glorious life [he'd] only dreamed about when [he] was young, and had somehow gotten used to now", J-Hope reflected on his success in the track "Airplane" before closing the mixtape with the atmospheric, melancholic track "Blue Side (Outro)".

== Critical reception ==
Kim Do-heon of IZM rated the mixtape 2.5 out of 5 stars. He wrote that it shows J-hope's potential rather than his full capacity as an artist.

Ru Bhat of Rolling Stone India wrote that the mixtape "brings healing from within and helps us have faith in our own decisions about our future."

== Commercial performance ==
On the week ending March 1, Hope World debuted at number sixty-three on the Billboard 200 with 9,000 equivalent album sales from less than one day of sales. It reached its highest sales week on the week ending March 8, 2018 with 12,000 equivalent album sales, making J-Hope the highest-charting Korean solo act on the chart at the time at number 38. Three mixtape tracks, "Daydream", "Hope World", and "Hangsang", charted on the World Digital Songs Chart, at number 3, 16, and 24 respectively. The following week, the tracks rose to number 1, 6, and 11, with three additional tracks off of Hope World, "Airplane", "Base Line", and "P.O.P (Piece of Peace) pt. 1" arriving on the chart at number 5, 6, and 12, respectively. "Daydream" made J-Hope one of only ten Korean groups, including his band BTS, to reach number one on the World Digital Songs Chart. The success of his solo debut led J-Hope to rank at number 3 on the Emerging Artists Chart, and 97 on the Artist 100 Chart for the week of March 10, later peaking at number 91 for the week of March 17. He was the fifth Korean artist, and the second Korean soloist after Psy, to place on the Artist 100. The mixtape charted in ten countries worldwide, with "Daydream" charting in three.

== Track listing ==
Credits adapted from the digital booklet released by Big Hit Entertainment. Additional citations from SoundCloud.

No.	Title	Writer(s)	Producer(s)	Length
1.	"Hope World"	Docskim; J-Hope	Docskim	3:24
2.	"P.O.P (Piece of Peace), Pt. 1"	J-Hope; Pdogg	J-Hope; Pdogg	3:01
3.	"Daydream" (백일몽; Baegilmong)	Pdogg; J-Hope	Pdogg	3:48
4.	"Base Line"	J-Hope; Supreme Boi	J-Hope; Supreme Boi	1:29
5.	"Hangsang" (항상; featuring Supreme Boi)	Supreme Boi; J-Hope	Supreme Boi	3:49
6.	"Airplane"	J-Hope; Supreme Boi	J-Hope; Supreme Boi	3:17
7.	"Blue Side (Outro)"	Hiss Noise; Adora; J-Hope	Hiss Noise; Adora	1:30
Total length:				20:20

== Personnel ==
Credits adapted from the digital credits released by Big Hit Entertainment; additional citations from SoundCloud.

- Adora – production, writing, digital editing, chorus, synthesizer, recording engineer
- DJ Wegun – scratch
- Docskim – production, writing, keyboard, synthesizer, bass
- Hiss Noise – production, writing, digital editing, keyboard
- Jeong U-yeong – recording engineer
- J-Hope – main vocals, production, writing, vocal arrangement, rap arrangement, chorus, keyboard, synthesizer, recording engineer
- Kim Seung-hyeon – guitar
- Lee Ju-yeong – bass
- Ken Lewis – mix engineer
- Randy Merrill – mastering engineer
- Na Jam-su – talk box
- Park Gi-won – recording engineer
- Park Jin-se – mix engineer
- Pdogg – production, writing, keyboard, synthesizer
- Slow Rabbit – vocal arrangement
- Supreme Boi – featured vocals, production, writing, rap arrangement, keyboard, digital editing, recording engineer
- Yang Ga – mix engineer

== Charts ==
=== Weekly charts ===
Chart (2018)	Peak position
Australian Albums (ARIA)	13
Austrian Albums (Ö3 Austria)	25
Canadian Albums (Billboard)	35
Dutch Albums (Album Top 100)	34
Finnish Albums (Suomen virallinen lista)	20
French Albums (SNEP)	160
Japan Hot Albums (Billboard Japan)	13
New Zealand Albums (RMNZ)	23
Norwegian Albums (VG-lista)	14
Spanish Albums (Promusicae)	62
Swedish Albums (Sverigetopplistan)	30
US Billboard 200	38
US Top Rap Albums (Billboard)	19
US World Albums (Billboard)	1

=== Year-end charts ===
Chart (2018)	Position
US World Albums (Billboard)	5

== Release history ==
Region	Date	Format	Label
Various	March 2, 2018	Streaming; digital download	Big Hit
