= The Rose (band) =

South Korean indie rock band

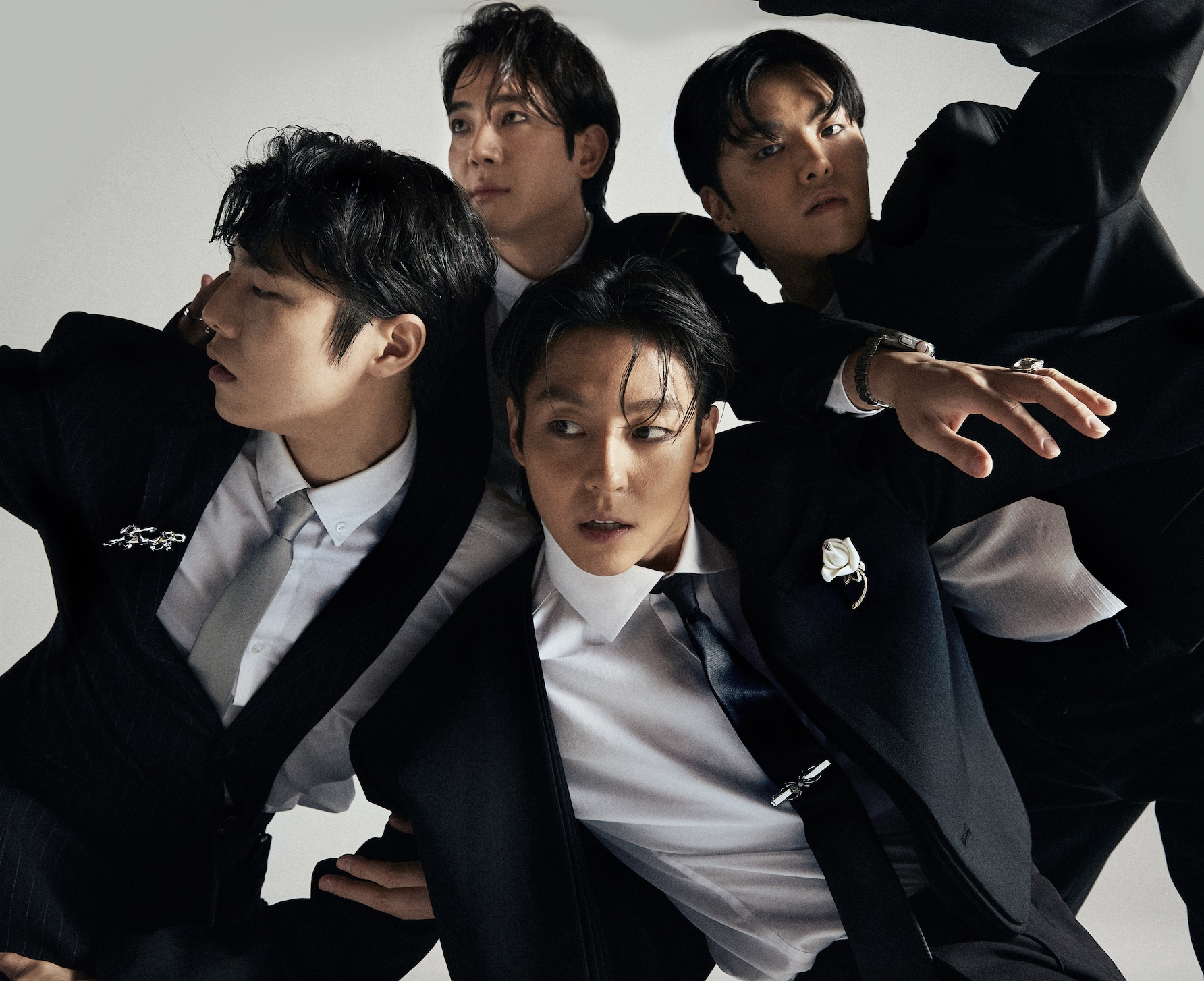
- The Rose in 2023

Background information
- Origin: Seoul, South Korea
- Genres: Art rock; pop rock; indie pop; indie rock; alternative rock
- Years active: 2017–present
- Labels: J&Star Company; Transparent Arts; Windfall
- Members: Woosung; Dojoon; Hajoon; Taegyeom

The Rose (Korean: 더로즈) is a South Korean indie-rock band represented by their company Windfall. The band is composed of four members: Kim Woosung (vocalist, guitar), Park Dojoon (vocals, guitar, keyboard), Lee Hajoon (drums, sub-vocals), Lee Taegyeom (bass, sub-vocals). While The Rose gained popularity early on, their debut single "Sorry," released on August 3, 2017, put them on the map and marked their first official entry into the mainstream music scene, showcasing their unique sound and earning them widespread international recognition.

== History ==
=== 2015–2016: Formation and early busking days ===
In early 2015, Dojoon and Taegyeom met while busking in Hongdae. Although the two enjoyed playing together, Dojoon had a very busy schedule as a DSP Media trainee and often couldn't meet. Later, Dojoon would also confess on a radio interview that his management company at the time frowned upon busking and he was not the type to disobey them. Taegyeom continued busking and met Hajoon later in the year while practicing in the same studio. Shortly thereafter, the duo started busking together and set out in search of another member.

By the end of 2015, Taegyeom recruited Dojoon, who left his company and started busking again. The trio started the indie band Windfall and began writing music together while posting cover songs on YouTube and performing in the streets. When the band decided to search for their fourth and final member, Dojoon worked to recruit Woosung, whom he had met through a mutual friend.

In 2016, the band was signed by J&Star Company.

=== 2017–2018: Mainstream debut, Paint it Rose Tour, Void and Dawn ===
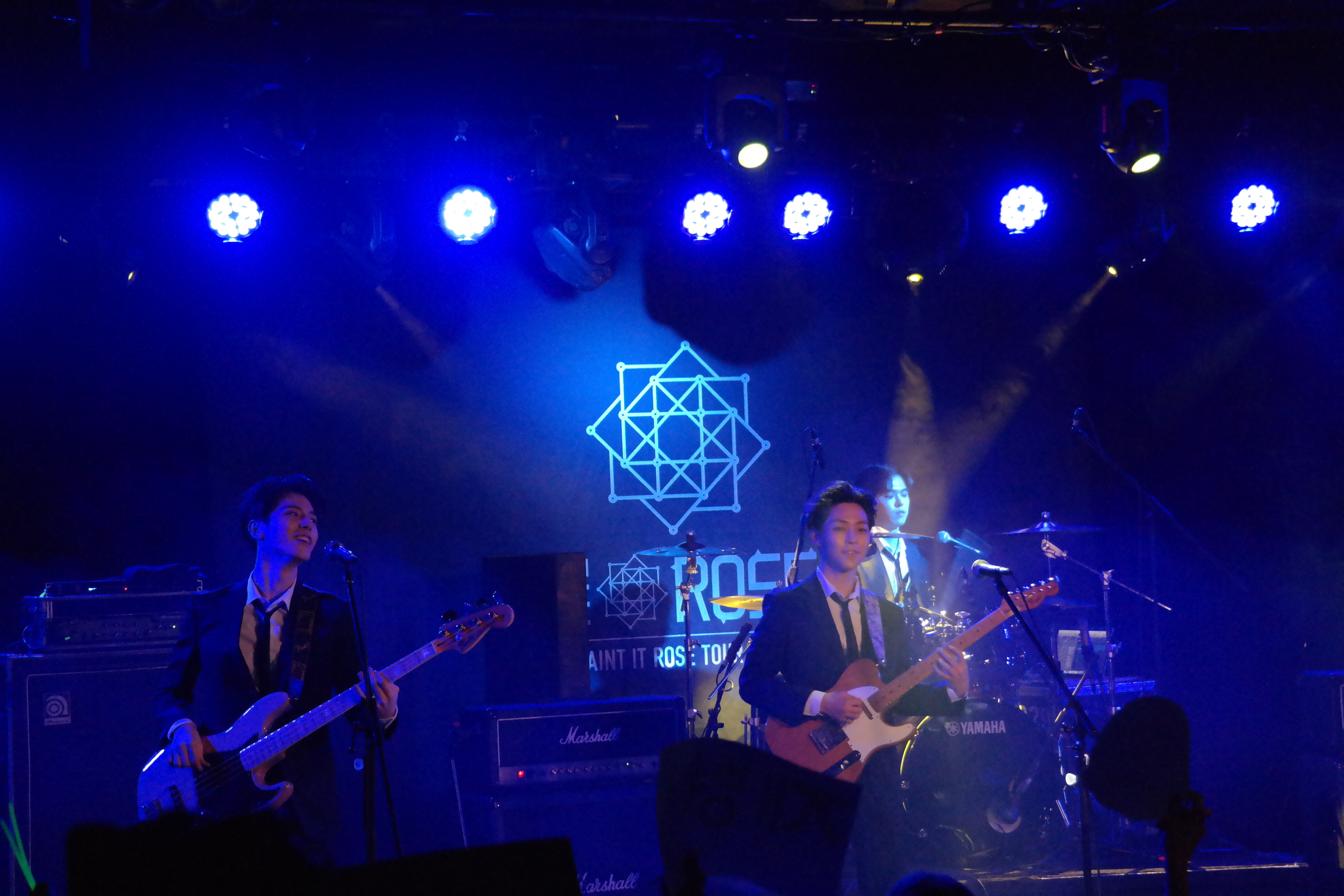
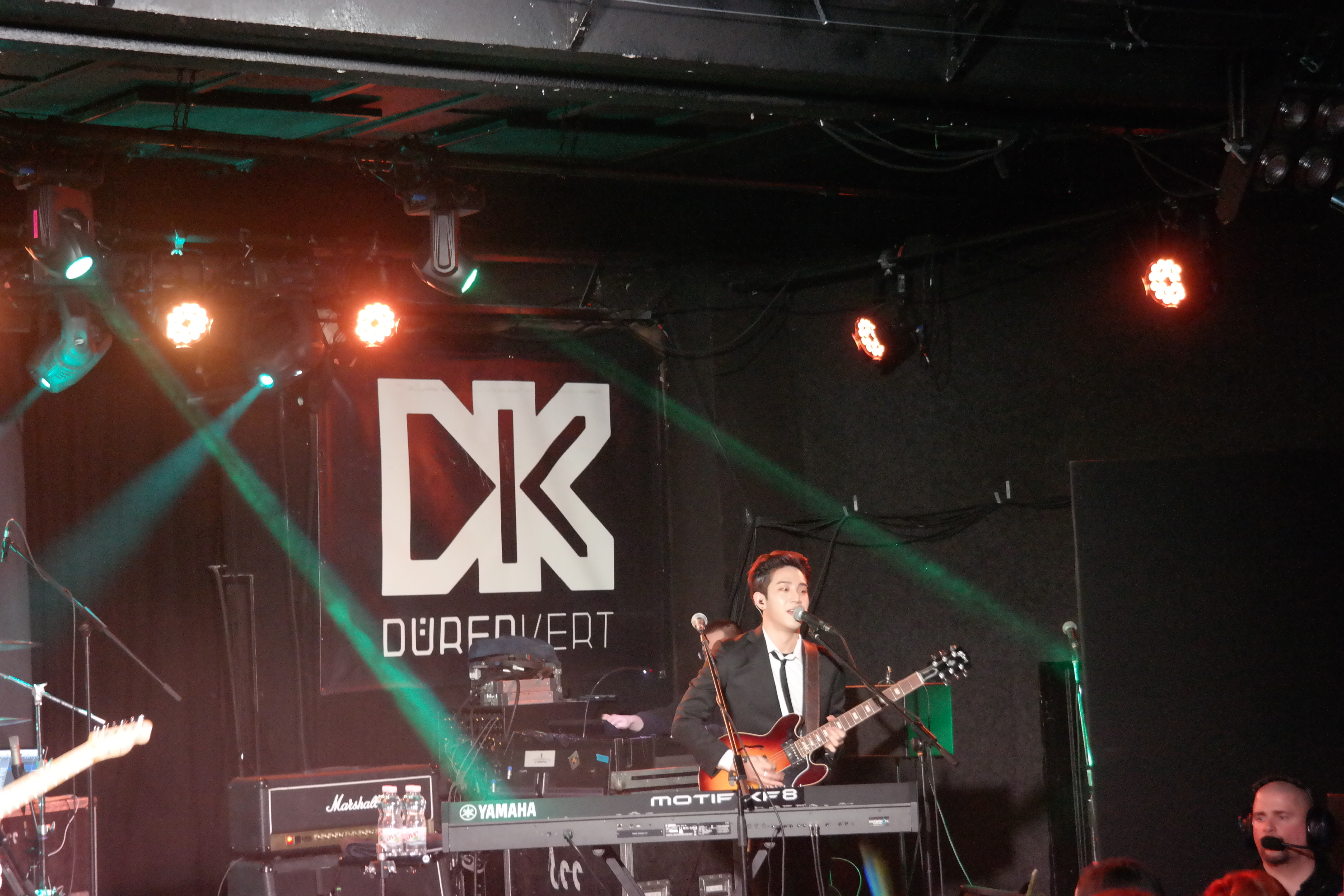
The Rose performing in Hungary on February 25, 2018

On August 3, 2017, the band debuted its mainstream single, "Sorry", penned by Hajoon and under a new name, The Rose. Later that month, the Rolling Stone India lauded The Rose's single for being "a fantastic introduction to the band's soft-rock vibe" and described "Woosung's immense control over his raspy vocals... particularly impressive." The group then made its first comeback on October 31,2017 with its second single, "Like We Used To."

On December 14, 2017, Billboard named The Rose's "Sorry" as one of the best Korean pop songs of 2017. By this time, the music video had garnered over 3 million views on YouTube, a startling number for a rookie group. Later that month, the band announced its first European tour titled, Paint It Rose, and performed sold-out shows in Brussels, Moscow, Istanbul, London and Budapest throughout the month of February 2018.

On December 24, 2017, the band hosted its first solo concert, The Black Rose Day at the Mpot Hall in Seoul. The group performed its two singles, covers of English songs, an unreleased song from the group's busking days titled "Photographer" and a cover of Woosung's then-unreleased song "Beautiful Girl."

On January 5, 2018, The Rose performed at the Rolling Hall 23rd Anniversary Concert, alongside other established indie artists such as Cheeze, O.WHEN, and Fromm. The band showcased three new unreleased songs, titled "Baby," "OMG," and "ILY."

On January 12, 2018, the band was listed as one of the top 5 Korean breakout artists to watch in 2018 by Billboard. The article stated it is "rare for rock-leaning bands to make a major K-pop impression upon debut, but The Rose's gorgeously emotive "Sorry" was able to do that, scoring a spot on Billboard's year-end critics' song list and confirming themselves a multifaceted, new talent on the scene."

On January 24, 2018, Soompi announced The Rose as one of the nominees for Rookie of the Year for its 13th Annual Soompi Awards.

On March 17, 2018, the band headlined the closing ceremony concert of the 29th Korean American Students Conference, hosted by Northwestern University in Chicago.

On April 16, 2018, The Rose released their first mini-album entitled Void. During their American tour that same year, the group talked with Billboard about their latest release, which said, "through the five-track effort, The Rose's intent was to highlight the darker elements of human emotion through dynamic pop-rock."

On August 14, 2018, The Rose was featured on the Tofu Personified (두부의 의인화) original soundtrack. Their featured song "With You" (너와) was written, composed and arranged by Jaehyeong, with vocals performed by Woosung.

On October 4, 2018, The Rose released their second mini-album entitled Dawn.

=== 2019–2021: Red, We Rose You Live Tour, lawsuit and military service ===
From April 12–July 12, 2019, The Rose participated in the music talent show Superband, produced by JTBC. The show invited indie musicians to perform and form new bands, competing against each other. Kim Woosung entered the competition with his band members, but he was the only one to advance to the next round. Temporarily forming the band Moné with other participants, they ultimately placed fourth in the finale. During his time on the show, Woosung co-wrote three songs as part of Moné, "Take Me Away," "Wooing," and “idc.”

Meanwhile, Woosung reunited with the other members and from May 17–19, 2019, The Rose performed for the first time at KCON Japan at Makuhari Messe in Chiba. On August 13, 2019, the band released their third single album Red and almost immediately embarked on their second world tour We Rose You Live Tour on August 17. On August 31, 2019, the band released the song "Strangers" (타인은 지옥이다) for the Hell Is Other People original soundtrack.

On January 15, 2020, it was announced that The Rose would be the opening act of Halsey's Manic World Tour in Seoul on May 9. However, the tour was pushed back to summer 2021 and eventually canceled due to continued uncertainty over to the COVID-19 pandemic.

In early 2020, The Rose participated in the popular South Korean television music competition program Immortal Songs: Singing the Legend. They revisited the 1984 disco sensation "City Street" by Jung Sura. Their first performance on the show was a winning one, securing the #1 spot in that episode with their rearrangement of the song highly praised by the legend herself, Jung Sura. The episode aired on February 29, 2020.

On February 28, 2020, The Rose filed a lawsuit against J&Star Company to terminate their exclusive contract. In their suit, the band alleged that the agency failed to provide any payment since their debut and that it demanded a dangerously rigorous performance and promotional schedule. J&Star Company denied the accusations. The suit was settled in June of 2021.

On July 6, 2020, Dojoon enlisted for his mandatory military service. On August 3, 2020, which marked the band's third anniversary since debut, active members Woosung, Hajoon, and Taegyeom revealed that they had created new social media accounts for the band and released the following statement in both Korean and English:

Hello, Our Lovely Black Roses

It's already our third year walking together on this beautiful road to wherever the destination may be. Everyday has been such a blessing for us ever since we met. Thank you always for being by our side through all the ups and downs. With every journey there is a detour or a resting period. We think with the members going to the army, now is the right time for us to just sit where ever we are and enjoy the view that we were not able to see while moving forward. There are things we can learn and experience only when we stop and take the time to appreciate. We really hope that we can come out of this and tell you guys all about our experiences. Until then we have prepared a little gift for our black roses, which we hope to reveal soon.

Miss you, see you in a bit.

— The Rose

On August 24, 2020, they released the single "Black Rose," named after and dedicated to their fans.

Members Hajoon and Taegyeom enlisted for their military service on October 12, 2020, and November 9, 2020, respectively.

Being an American citizen, Woosung was not required to serve in the Korean military and was able to focus on his solo endeavors. His first full length album GENRE was released on December 9, 2021, under his indie label Woolfpack. The album was described as “an atmospheric and emotional ride” by NME. It also featured collaborations with Kard's BM and Ladies’ Code's Ashley.

On December 29th, 2021, the band released the single "Beauty and the Beast."

=== 2022–present: Return and new label ===
Following the discharge of Dojoon, Hajoon, and Taegyeom from their military service, The Rose experienced a significant resurgence. Woosung, after releasing his EP Moth on May 13, 2022, completed his first solo world tour the MOTH EP Showcase in Seoul on June 26, 2022 with a surprise performance and heartwarming reunion of the band with their fans the Black Roses. Additionally, Woosung confirmed the establishment of the band's self-made label, Windfall, marking a new chapter in their career.

In August of 2022, the band signed with Far East Movement's Transparent Arts as their new label, with Transparent Arts and Wasserman Music representing the band. On October 7, 2022, they released the single "Sour" alongside their first studio album Heal. Additionally, in support of Heal, they announced their world tour, the Heal Together World Tour, with dates in North America, South America, Europe, and Asia beginning in 2022 and spanning into 2023.

On April 21, 2023, Suga of BTS collaborated with Woosung and the late Ryuichi Sakamoto on a song titled "Snooze", which is the ninth track of the former's solo album, D-Day.

On July 21, 2023, they released their single "Back To Me/Alive" with a music video for the song "Back To Me" followed by a music video for "Alive" on July 28, 2023. Their second studio album DUAL was released on September 22, 2023.

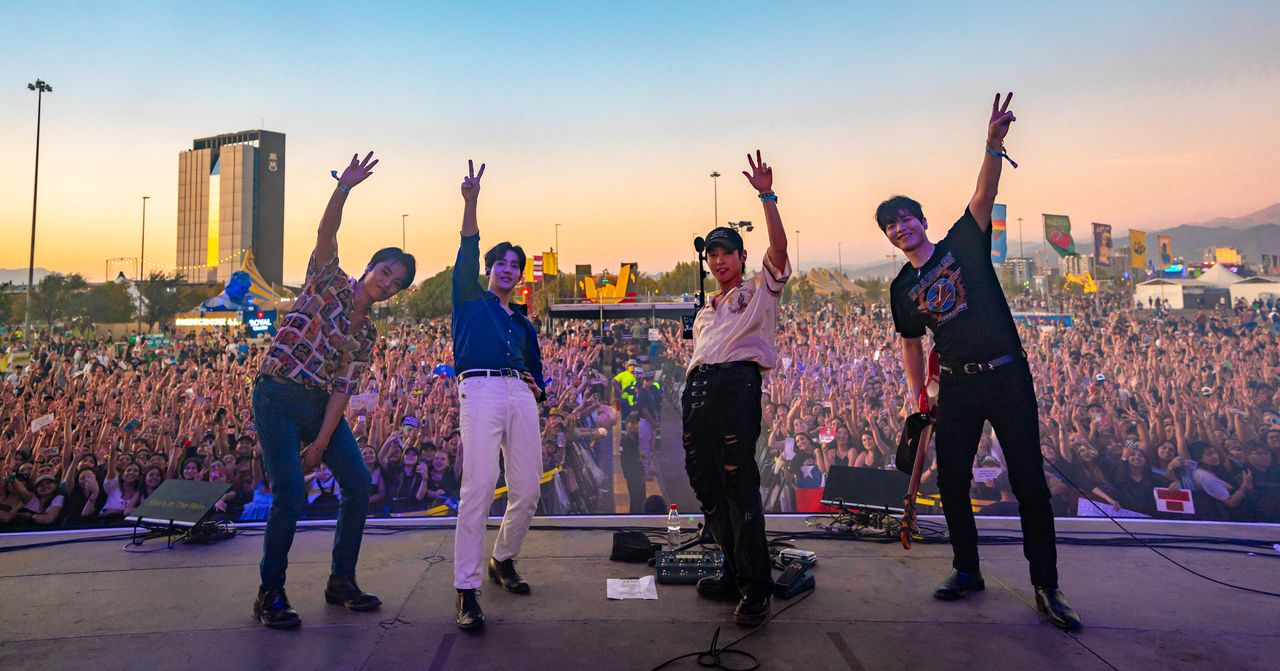
The Rose performing at Lollapalooza Chile 2023

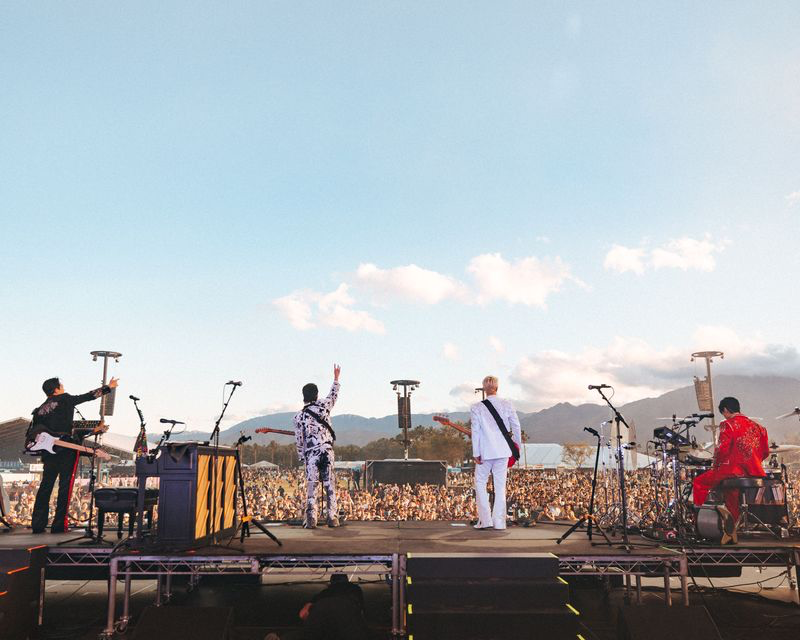
The Rose performing at Coachella 2024

In October 2023, their album DUAL made it to the Billboard 200 chart at #83 in its first week of release. In addition to charting on the all-genre album chart, they also made a momentous debut by placing #1 on Billboard's Emerging Artists chart, #33 on Billboard's Artist Chart, #5 on Billboard's Album Sales chart, #5 on Billboard's Current Album Sales chart, #3 on Billboard's Current Alternative Albums chart, #2 on Billboard's current Rock Albums chart, # 7 on Billboard's Digital Albums chart and #2 on Billboard's Internet Albums chart.

The Rose embarked on their highly anticipated US/Canada Dawn to Dusk tour on October 4, 2023. The tour featured a series of sold-out shows across major North American cities, highlighting the band's growing popularity in North America. It concluded with a landmark performance at the Kia Forum in Los Angeles, where they played to a full house. The successful North American leg was followed by their Asia and Europe tour legs, which kicked off in the Philippines on January 26, 2024 and finished in Spain on April 5, 2024.

Throughout 2023, The Rose undertook a successful year of festival concerts, performing at iconic music and arts festivals worldwide, including Lollapalooza Chicago, Brazil, Stockholm, Argentina and Chile, CONquest in Manila and Mad Cool in Madrid among other cities. In April 2024, they notably performed at Coachella where they took on The Outdoor Theater stage at the renowned festival for the two consecutive Sundays on April 14th and 21st. Their performances received enthusiastic acclaim, marking a major milestone in their career.

On April 2, 2025, the group announced their Once Upon a Wrld tour, a 29 city tour with shows in Europe, Asia, South America, and the US. The tour began on June 9 in Zurich, Switzerland, and concluded on August 30 in Seoul, South Korea. Prior to the tour, the band released their third EP Wrld marking their first new release in a year.

On April 10, 2026, The Rose announced they would be taking a hiatus following the release of their new album Rose and their 2026 tour Rosetopia. Rosetopia is a multi-city tour with shows in the US. South America, Europe and Asia. The tour began was unusual in that it started before the completion of the album which was released in August of 2026. Two songs were released as singles prior to the start of the tour, Blue Moon and Utopia, while additional unreleased tracks were part of the set list prior to the release of the full album Walking on Clouds and Threshold, making for a unique tour experience. After the album was released, Chemical was added to the set list.

== Pop culture ==
On Aug 15, 2023, New York Times best selling author Gail Carriger wrote in a blog that her character of Kagee in the Tinkered Starsong series was influenced by lead singer Woosung.

In 2023, Kim Woosung landed his first role in the anticipated Netflix animated series Jentry Chau vs. the Underworld, led by Ali Wong. This project marks Woosung's acting debut. He expressed his excitement about joining the cast by sharing the news on Instagram, highlighting this new venture in his career. The series was released on 5 December 2024 on Netflix.

In 2025, The Rose: Come Back to Me, a documentary directed by Eugene Yi about the band's professional journey, premiered at the Tribeca Festival.

== Members ==
- Woosung (우성) – vocals, guitars
- Dojoon (도준) – vocals, keyboards, guitars
- Hajoon (하준) – drums, sub-vocals
- Taegyeom (태겸)-bass, sub-vocals

== Discography ==
=== Studio albums ===
| Title | Details | Peak chart positions | | | Sales |
| Title | Details | KOR | BEL (WA) | US | Sales |
|---|---|---|---|---|---|
| Heal | Released: October 7, 2022; Label: Transparent Arts/Warner Music Korea; Formats: CD, digital download; Tracklist: 1. "~"; 2. "Definition of Ugly Is"; 3. "Childhood"; 4. "Shift"; 5. "Cure"; 6. "See-Saw"; 7. "Time"; 8. "Yes" featuring James Reid; 9. "Sour"; 10. "-" | 20 | — | — | KOR: 32,000 |
| Dual | Released: September 22, 2023; Label: Transparent Arts/Warner Music Korea; Formats: CD, digital download; Tracklist: 1. "Dawn"; 2. "You're Beautiful"; 3. "Nauseous"; 4. "Back to Me"; 5. "Lifeline"; 6. "Dusk"; 7. "Angel" featuring Trevor Daniel; 8. "Eclipse"; 9. "Alive"; 10. "Cosmo"; 11. "Wonder" | 8 | 26 | 83 | KOR: 52,058 |

=== Single albums ===
| Title | Details | Peak chart positions | Sales |
| Title | Details | KOR | Sales |
|---|---|---|---|
| Red | Released: August 13, 2019; Label: J&Star Company; Formats: CD, digital download; Tracklist: 1. "California"; 2. "Red"; 3. "Red" (Inst.) | 8 | KOR: 9,192 |

=== Extended plays ===
| Title | Details | Peak chart positions | | | | | Sales |
| Title | Details | KOR | AUT | BEL (WA) | SWI | US World | Sales |
|---|---|---|---|---|---|---|---|
| Void | Released: April 16, 2018; Label: J&Star Company; Formats: CD, digital download; Tracklist: 1. "Candy (So Good)"; 2. "Baby"; 3. "I.L.Y."; 4. "Sorry"; 5. "Like We Used To" (좋았는데); 6. "Baby" (Inst.); 7. "Sorry" (Inst.); 8. "I.L.Y." (Inst.) | 25 | — | — | — | 8 | KOR: 6,371+ |
| Dawn | Released: October 4, 2018; Label: J&Star Company; Formats: CD, digital download; Tracklist: 1. "I Don't Know You"; 2. "She's in the Rain"; 3. "Take Me Down"; 4. "Insomnia" (불면증); 5. "She's in the Rain" (Inst.) | 8 | — | — | — | 5 | KOR: 5,515+ |
| Wrld | Released: May 30, 2025; Label: Transparent Arts; Formats: CD, digital download; Tracklist: 1. "Breath" (숨); 2. "Nebula"; 3. "O"; 4. "Tomorrow"; 5. "Nevermind"; 6. "Slowly"; 7. "Ticket to the Sky" | 19 | 56 | 108 | 76 | — | KOR: 20,402 |

=== Singles ===
| Title | Year | Peak chart positions | Album |
| Title | Year | US World | Album |
As lead artist
| "Sorry" | 2017 | 14 | Sorry |
| "Like We Used To" (좋았는데) | 2017 | — | Like We Used To |
| "Baby" | 2018 | 14 | Void |
| "She's in the Rain" | 2018 | 13 | Dawn |
| "Red" | 2019 | 7 | Red |
| "Black Rose" | 2020 | — | Non-album singles |
| "Beauty and the Beast" (미녀와 야수) | 2021 | 15 | Non-album singles |
| "Childhood" | 2022 | — | Heal |
| "Sour" | 2022 | — | Heal |
| "Back to Me" | 2023 | — | Dual |
| "Alive" | 2023 | — | Dual |
| "You're Beautiful" | 2023 | — | Dual |
| "Wonder" | 2023 | — | Dual |
| "Lifeline (Reborn)" | 2024 | — | Non-album single |
| "O" | 2025 | — | Wrld |
| "Trauma" | 2025 | — | Non-album single |
| "Blue Moon" | 2026 | | Rose |
| "Utopia" | 2026 | — | Rose |
Soundtrack appearances
| "With You" (너와) | 2018 | — | Tofu Personified OST Part 3 |
| "Strangers" (타인은 지옥이다) | 2019 | — | Hell Is Other People OST Part 1 |
"—" denotes releases that did not chart or were not released in that region.

== Tours and concerts ==
Headlining concerts in Seoul

- The Black Rose Day (2017)
- The Rose Day: Long Drive (2018)
- Home Coming (2018)

Headlining tours

- Paint it Rose Tour in Europe (2018)
- Paint it Rose Tour in USA (2018)
- Paint it Rose Tour in Mexico/South America (2018)
- Paint it Rose Tour in Europe/Australia: 2nd Coloring (2018)
- We Rose You Live Tour (2019)
- Heal Together World Tour (2022)
- Dawn To Dusk Tour (2023)
- Once Upon A WRLD Tour (2025)
- The Rose World Tour: Rosetopia (2026)

== Festivals ==
- WavyBaby Festival (Jan 2023) - Philippines
- Festival Estéreo Picnic (March 2023) - Colombia
- Lollapalooza Argentina (March 2023) - Argentina
- Lollapalooza Chile (March 2023) - Chile
- Lollapalooza Brazil (March 2023) - Brazil
- CONQuest Festival (June 2023) - Philippines
- Lollapalooza Stockholm (June 2023) - Sweden
- Main Square Festival (July 2023) - France
- BST Hyde Park (July 2023) - UK
- Montreux Jazz Festival (July 2023) - Switzerland
- Mad Cool Festival (July 2023) - Spain
- Lollapalooza Chicago (August 2023) - United States
- LMAC Music For All Fest (Sept 2023) - Indonesia
- Life is Beautiful Music & Arts Festival (Sept 2023) - United States
- Music Midtown (Sept 2023) - United States
- Lollapalooza Mumbai (January 2024) - India
- Coachella (April 2024) - United States
- One Universe (July 2026) - South Korea
- Prambanan Jazz Festival - (July 2026) - Indonesia
- Madley Medley Festival - (September 2026) South Korea
- Heartbeat by Duduo Korea University - (October 2026) South Korea

== Filmography ==
=== Film ===
| Year | Title | Note(s) | Ref. |
|---|---|---|---|
| 2025 | The Rose: Come Back to Me | Documentary | |
| 2024 | K-Pops! | Cameo | |

=== Television ===
| Year | Title | Note(s) | Ref. |
|---|---|---|---|
| 2018 | The Rose TV | The Rose-based reality show, 4 episodes | |
| 2022 | The Rose HEAL Project | The Rose official YouTube documentary, 4 episodes | |
| 2023 | The Rose in Bloom | The Rose official YouTube documentary, 8 episodes | |

== Videography ==
=== Music videos ===
| Year | Title | Director(s) |
|---|---|---|
| 2017 | "Sorry" | Unknown |
| 2017 | "Like We Used To" (좋았는데) | Son Dong-rak & Song Jung-kyu |
| 2018 | "Baby" | Unknown |
| 2018 | "She's in the Rain" | Unknown |
| 2019 | "Red" | STONE |
| 2020 | "Black Rose" | Unknown |
| 2021 | "Beauty and the Beast" | Unknown |
| 2022 | "Childhood" | Curry Sicong Tian |
| 2022 | "Sour" | Daniel DPD Park |
| 2023 | "Back To Me" | Muyu Media |
| 2023 | "Alive" | KORLIO |
| 2023 | "You're Beautiful" | Christian Haahs |
| 2023 | "Wonder: Venn Diagram Project" | Tony K |
| | "Wonder" | Christian Haahs |
| 2024 | "Lifeline Reborn" | |

== Awards and nominations ==
Name of the award ceremony, year presented, award category, nominee(s) of the award, and the result of the nomination
| Award ceremony | Year | Category | Nominee(s) | Result | Ref. |
|---|---|---|---|---|---|
| International K-Music Awards | 2018 | Most Promising Artist | The Rose | Won | |
