= Kim Woo-sung (singer) =

South Korean musician

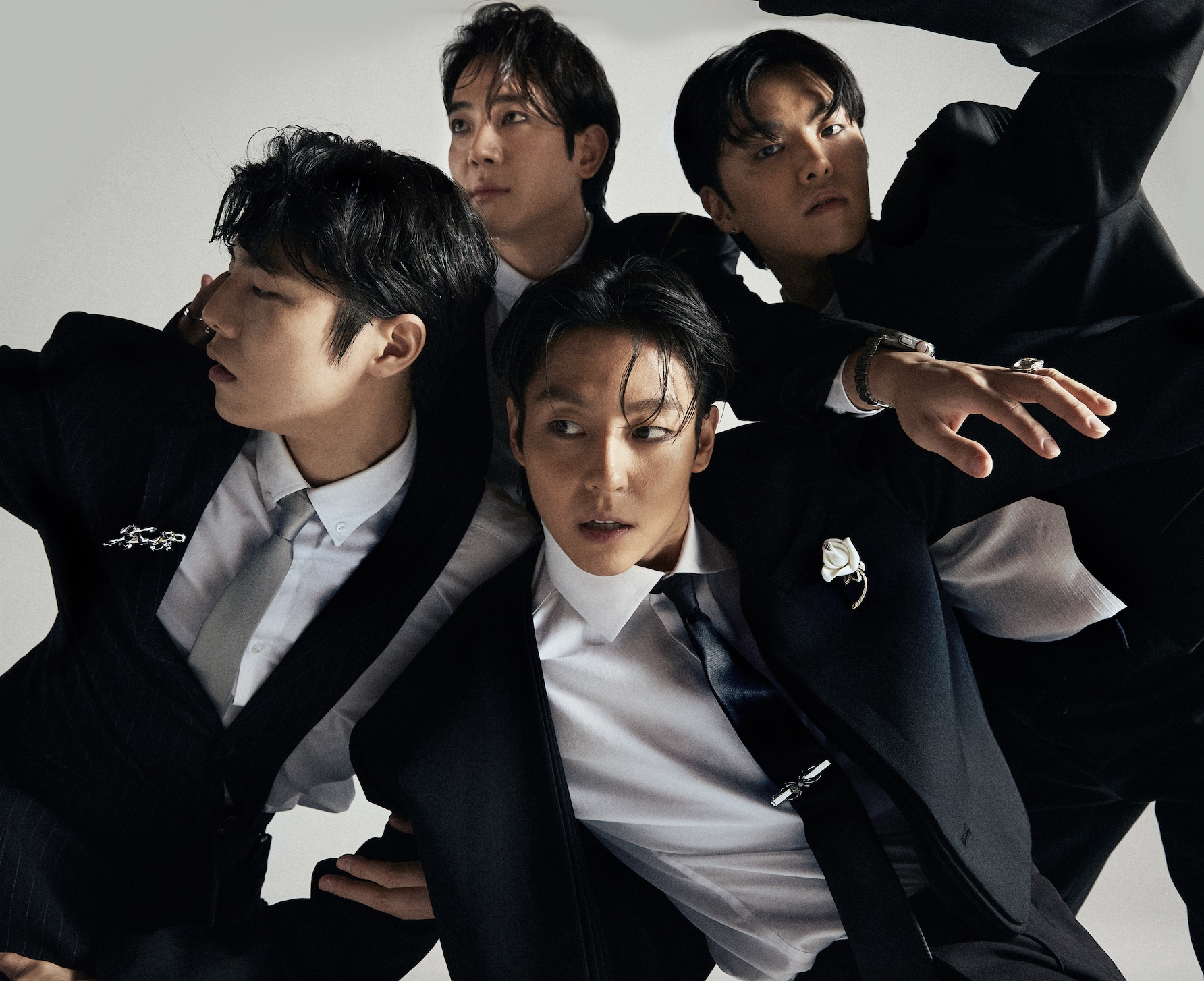

Background information
- Also known as: Sammy
- Born: February 25, 1993 (age 33); Wonju, Gangwon, South Korea
- Genres: KIndie; K-pop; KRock
- Occupations: Singer; musician; songwriter
- Instruments: Vocals; guitar
- Years active: 2017–present
- Labels: Transparent Arts; Woolfpack; Windfall

Korean name
- Hangul: 김우성
- RR: Gim Useong
- MR: Kim Usŏng

Kim Woosung (Korean: 김우성; born February 25, 1993), also known as Woosung and Sammy, is a Korean-American musician. He is best known as the lead vocalist and guitarist of the South Korean indie-rock band The Rose. He also made his solo debut in 2019 with the extended play Wolf.

== Early life ==
Woosung was born in Wonju in South Korea before moving to the United States in his early childhood. Growing up he aspired to play American football, but when a shoulder injury in ninth grade derailed those plans, Woosung redirected his passion toward music.

== Career ==
In 2011, he auditioned for the South Korean reality TV competition series K-pop Star. After narrowly missing being included in the show's top ten artists, Woosung took a three year break from music and taught English in Korea. Late 2015, Park Dojoon, keyboard player for indie act Windfall, asked Woosung to join the band. In 2016, Windfall adopted the name "The Rose" and signed with J&Star Company.

He debuted on August 3, 2017, as a lead vocalist and electric guitarist of indie-rock band, The Rose alongside members, Park Dojoon (English name: Leo), Lee Hajoon (English name: Dylan), and Lee Jaehyeong (name changed to Lee Taegyeom 이태겸 as of May 26, 2025) (English name: Jeff). Woosung was the last member to join the band. The band's first release was their critically acclaimed hit single "Sorry". On December 14, 2017, Billboard named The Rose's "Sorry" as one of the best Korean pop songs of 2017.

On March 20, 2019, it was announced on Twitter Woosung would be the third MC on After School Club, replacing Seungmin from Stray Kids . He co-hosted along with Jamie and Han Hee-jun beginning with episode 361 on March 26, 2019. Woosung officially left the show on December 31, 2019, due to his busy schedule.

From April 12 – July 12, 2019, Woosung participated in the music talent show Superband, produced by JTBC. The show invited indie musicians to perform and form new bands, competing against each other. Woosung entered the competition with his band members, but he was the only one to advance to the next round. Temporarily forming the band Moné with other participants, including Isaac Hong, they ultimately placed fourth in the finale. During his time on the show, Woosung co-wrote three songs as part of Moné: "Take Me Away;" "Wooing;" and "idc."

Woosung's solo pre-release single "Lonely" came out on July 19, 2019. His first extended play Wolf was released the following week on July 25, along with the title track "Face". The music video for "Face" was directed by Lee Rae Kyung and quickly amassed more than 20 million views on YouTube. The EP peaked at number 19 on the Gaon Album Chart.

On October 22, 2019, Woosung worked on the soundtrack for the K-Drama Catch The Ghost releasing "Feel My Heart."

On November 15, 2019, Woosung released "Beautiful Girl" featuring BtoB's Peniel.

In December 2019, Woosung worked on another original soundtrack, "Wanna Be Bad", for the K-Drama series Psychopath Diaries. In 2020, Woosung lent his vocals to the original soundtrack of the award-winning K-drama series, Itaewon Class, for a track titled "You Make Me Back".

On September 7, 2021, it was announced that Woosung would be releasing an audio collection on Mindset by Dive Studios, a podcast platform offering personal, in-depth interviews with celebrities and influencers, focusing on mental health, personal growth, and well-being. The collection, composed of 12 episodes, was released on September 8, 2021. It is available on all Mindset platforms, providing listeners with insights into Woosung's life and professional experiences and his unique and compelling perspective.

Woosung's first full-length album Genre was released under his self-owned indie label, Woolfpack, on December 9, 2021. It included collaborations with KARD's BM on 'CWS' and Ladies' Code's Ashley on 'Oh', alongside previously released songs "Dimples" (September 2021) and "Lazy" (July 2021).

From March 1, 2022 through April 12 of that same year, Woosung opened for Epik High on their North American tour.

In 2022, Woosung signed with Transparent Arts and released his second EP Moth on May 13, 2022, which featured the title track, "Phase Me," that Woosung debuted during his tour with Epik High. Just three days after the Epik High tour ended, on April 15, 2022, Woosung started his own tour in Europe, the USA, and Canada. Titled the "Moth EP Showcase", the mini solo tour ended on May 26, 2022, in Seoul, with a special appearance by the rest of The Rose members, Dojoon, Hajoon and Jaehyeong, who had just recently been discharged from their mandatory military service.

In July 2022, The Attire, a Los Angeles-based duo, released 'Sriracha' featuring Woosung. He also features prominently in the music video for the song.

On April 21, 2023, Woosung featured on the track "Snooze" from Agust D's (also known as Suga of BTS) album D-Day. The track would also feature Ryuichi Sakamoto, and the song would become the legendary composer's last work as he died shortly after its completion. The song has received great critical acclaim and commercial success and quickly became a fan favorite, with all three artists' contributions being highly praised.

On March 29, 2023, the cast for Jentry Chau vs. the Underworld, a Netflix original animated series led and produced by Ali Wong, was revealed, announcing Woosung as one of the voice stars. The series was released in December 2024.

Woosung updated his official website on May 16, 2024, hinting at a possible new EP in the works, cryptically titled "4444". Fans immediately began speculating about the significance of "4444" and what it might mean for Woosung's upcoming music and artistic projects. Woosung later released "4444" on October 4, the album includes 8 songs. He noted that 4444 was a way for him to explore the personal connection to the number 4 that has been a special guiding force in his life. It is also a way to break the superstition around the number 4 being unlucky in Asian culture.

== Discography ==
=== Studio albums ===
Title	Album details	Peak chart positions	Sales
Title	Album details	KOR	Sales
Genre	Released: December 9, 2021; Label: Woolfpack; Formats: Digital download; Track listing: 1. "Hangover"; 2. "Lazy" (feat. Reddy); 3. "Dimples"; 4. "Oh" (feat. Ashley); 5. "No Strings Attached"; 6. "CWS" (feat. BM); 7. "Island"	—	
4444	Released: October 4, 2024; Label: Transparent Arts, Woolfpack; Formats: CD, vinyl, digital download; Track listing: 1. "Paper Cuts" (feat. New Vaticans); 2. "Before We Die"; 3. "Day That I Died"; 4. "44 (Forget Forever)"; 5. "Never Let Go"; 6. "Found You"; 7. "Happy Alone" (feat. B.I); 8. "Let There Be Light" (feat. BOL4)	19	KOR: 11,505

=== Extended plays ===
Title	EP details	Peak chart positions	Sales
Title	EP details	KOR	Sales
Wolf	Released: July 25, 2019; Label: J&Star Company; Formats: CD, digital download; Track listing: 1. "Wolf"; 2. "Moon"; 3. "Face"; 4. "Lonely" (외로워); 5. "Face" (Inst.)	19	KOR: 5,998
Moth	Released: May 13, 2022; Label: Woolfpack; Formats: CD, digital download; Track listing: 1. "Come Down"; 2. "Side Effects"; 3. "Phase Me"; 4. "Modern Life"	18	KOR: 9,075

=== Singles ===
Title	Year	Peak chart positions	Album
Title	Year	US World	Album
As lead artist
"Lonely" (외로워)	2019	—	Wolf
"Face"	2019	21	Wolf
"Beautiful Girl" (featuring Peniel)	2019	—	Non-album single
"Lazy" (featuring Reddy)	2021	—	Genre
"Dimples"	2021	—	Genre
"Phase Me"	2022	—	Moth
"Day That I Died"	2024	—	4444
"44 (Forget Forever)"	2024	—	4444
Collaborations
"Sign of the Times" (with Lee Chan-sol)	2019	—	JTBC SuperBand Episode 5
"ILYSB" (with DPOLE, Mellow Kitchen and Kim Hyung-woo)	2019	—	JTBC SuperBand Episode 7
"Cake by the Ocean" (with Hwang Min-jae, Park Ji-hwan and Kim Ha-jin)	2019	—	JTBC SuperBand Episode 10
Soundtrack appearances
"Feel My Heart"	2019	—	Catch the Ghost OST Part 1
"Wanna Be Bad"	2019	—	Psychopath Diary OST Part 1
"You Make Me Back"	2020	—	Itaewon Class OST Part 5
"You Are My Star"	2021	—	Idol: The Coup Original Television Soundtrack

=== Songwriting and composing credits ===
Note: all songs released by The Rose are written and composed by the band, and are thus credited as such.

Year	Album	Artist	Song	Lyrics		Composer	
Year	Album	Artist	Song	Credited	With	Credited	With
2019	Wolf	Woosung	"Wolf"	Yes	–	Yes	–
2019	Wolf	Woosung	"Moon"	Yes	–	Yes	–
2019	Wolf	Woosung	"Face"	Yes	–	Yes	–
2019	Wolf	Woosung	"Lonely"	Yes	–	Yes	–
2019	Non-album singles	Woosung	"Beautiful Girl"	Yes	Peniel	Yes	Jerry. L
2021	GENRE	Woosung	"Hangover"	Yes	–	Yes	Lee Gyu-ho
2021	GENRE	Woosung	"Lazy"	Yes	Reddy	Yes	Lee Gyu-ho, Kim Hong-woo
2021	GENRE	Woosung	"Dimples"	Yes	–	Yes	Lee Gyu-ho
2021	GENRE	Woosung	"Oh"	Yes	Makecake36	Yes	Makecake36
2021	GENRE	Woosung	"No Strings Attached"	Yes	–	Yes	Lee Gyu-ho
2021	GENRE	Woosung	"CWS"	Yes	BM	Yes	Lee Gyu-ho
2021	GENRE	Woosung	"island"	Yes		Yes	Lee Gyu-ho
2022	MOTH	Woosung	"Come Down"	Yes	Ian Jeffrey Thomas, Sweaterbeats	Yes	Sweaterbeats
2022	MOTH	Woosung	"Side "Effects"	Yes	Ian Jeffrey Thomas	Yes	Sweaterbeats
2022	MOTH	Woosung	"Phase Me"	Yes	Ian Jeffrey Thomas, Liv Miraldi, Sweaterbeats	Yes	Sweaterbeats
2022	MOTH	Woosung	"Modern Life"	Yes	Sweaterbeats, The Rose	Yes	Sweaterbeats

== Filmography ==
=== Television ===
Year	Title	Network	Note(s)	Ref.
2011–12	K-pop Star (season 1)	SBS	Contestant	
2019	After School Club	Arirang TV	Host with Jamie and Heejun	
2019	Superband	JTBC	Contestant; his team ranked 4th during the finals	
2020	Immortal Songs	KBS	Contestant; Woosung and band members from The Rose won 1st place	
2024	Jentry Chau vs. the Underworld	Netflix	Voiceover actor	

=== Music videos ===
Year	Title	Director	Ref.
2019	"Face"	ITCHCOCK	
2019	"Beautiful Girl"	Kim JW Andy	
2021	"Lazy"	Valentina Vee	
2021	"Dimples"	HYEYA	
2021	"CWS" (feat. BM of KARD)	Valentina Vee	
2022	"Phase Me"	Jonathan Chou	
2022	"ComE dOWn" (Visualizer)		

== Tours and concerts ==
Opening Act

- Epik High US Tour 2022 (Solo)

Headlining concerts in Seoul

- The Black Rose Day (2017)
- The Rose Day: Long Drive (2018)
- Home Coming (2018)

Headlining tours

- Paint it Rose Tour in Europe (2018)
- Paint it Rose Tour in USA (2018)
- Paint it Rose Tour in Mexico/South America (2018)
- Paint it Rose Tour in Europe/Australia: 2nd Coloring (2018)
- We Rose You Live Tour (2019)
- Heal Together World Tour (2022)
- Dawn To Dusk Tour (2023)

== Festivals ==
- WavyBaby Festival (Jan 2023) - Philippines
- Festival Estéreo Picnic (March 2023) - Colombia
- Lollapalooza Argentina (March 2023) - Argentina
- Lollapalooza Chile (March 2023) - Chile
- Lollapalooza Brazil (March 2023) - Brazil
- CONQuest Festival (June 2023) - Philippines
- Lollapalooza Stockholm (June 2023) - Sweden
- Main Square Festival (July 2023) - France
- BST Hyde Park (July 2023) - UK
- Montreux Jazz Festival (July 2023) - Switzerland
- Mad Cool Festival (July 2023) - Spain
- Lollapalooza Chicago (August 2023) - United States
- LMAC Music For All Fest (Sept 2023) - Indonesia
- Life is Beautiful Music & Arts Festival (Sept 2023) - United States
- Music Midtown (Sept 2023) - United States
- Lollapalooza Mumbai (January 2024) - India
- Coachella (April 2024) - United States
