= List of Ultratop 50 number-one singles of 2023 =

These hits topped the Ultratop 50 in 2023.

Number-one singles of 2023 in Flanders
Flanders
Issue date	Song	Artist	Ref.
7 January	"Anti-Hero"	Taylor Swift	
14 January	"Anti-Hero"	Taylor Swift	
21 January	"Flowers"	Miley Cyrus	
28 January	"Flowers"	Miley Cyrus	
4 February	"Flowers"	Miley Cyrus	
11 February	"Flowers"	Miley Cyrus	
18 February	"Flowers"	Miley Cyrus	
25 February	"Flowers"	Miley Cyrus	
4 March	"Flowers"	Miley Cyrus	
11 March	"People Help the People"	Artiesten voor 12-12	
18 March	"Flowers"	Miley Cyrus	
25 March	"Flowers"	Miley Cyrus	
1 April	"Flowers"	Miley Cyrus	
8 April	"Flowers"	Miley Cyrus	
15 April	"Flowers"	Miley Cyrus	
22 April	"Flowers"	Miley Cyrus	
29 April	"Flowers"	Miley Cyrus	
6 May	"Flowers"	Miley Cyrus	
13 May	"Flowers"	Miley Cyrus	
20 May	"Tattoo"	Loreen	
27 May	"Tattoo"	Loreen	
3 June	"Tattoo"	Loreen	
10 June	"Tattoo"	Loreen	
17 June	"Tattoo"	Loreen	
24 June	"Tattoo"	Loreen	
1 July	"Tattoo"	Loreen	
8 July	"Tattoo"	Loreen	
15 July	"Tattoo"	Loreen	
22 July	"Tattoo"	Loreen	
29 July	"Erop of eronder"	Pommelien Thijs	
5 August	"(It Goes Like) Nanana"	Peggy Gou	
12 August	"Dance the Night"	Dua Lipa	
19 August	"Erop of eronder"	Pommelien Thijs	
26 August	"Erop of eronder"	Pommelien Thijs	
2 September	"Erop of eronder"	Pommelien Thijs	
9 September	"Erop of eronder"	Pommelien Thijs	
16 September	"Erop of eronder"	Pommelien Thijs	
23 September	"(It Goes Like) Nanana"	Peggy Gou	
30 September	"Eigen schuld"	Metejoor	
7 October	"Eigen schuld"	Metejoor	
14 October	"Dance the Night"	Dua Lipa	
21 October	"Prada"	Cassö, Raye and D-Block Europe	
28 October	"Prada"	Cassö, Raye and D-Block Europe	
4 November	"Prada"	Cassö, Raye and D-Block Europe	
11 November	"Eigen schuld"	Metejoor	
18 November	"Houdini"	Dua Lipa	
25 November	"Prada"	Cassö, Raye and D-Block Europe	
2 December	"Lose Control"	Teddy Swims	
9 December	"Prada"	Cassö, Raye and D-Block Europe	
16 December	"Prada"	Cassö, Raye and D-Block Europe	
23 December	"Stick Season"	Noah Kahan	
30 December	"All I Want for Christmas Is You"	Mariah Carey	

Number-one singles of 2023 in Wallonia
Wallonia
Issue date	Song	Artist	Ref.
7 January	"I'm Good (Blue)"	David Guetta and Bebe Rexha	
14 January	"The Loneliest"	Måneskin	
21 January	"The Loneliest"	Måneskin	
28 January	"Flowers"	Miley Cyrus	
4 February	"Flowers"	Miley Cyrus	
11 February	"Flowers"	Miley Cyrus	
18 February	"Flowers"	Miley Cyrus	
25 February	"Flowers"	Miley Cyrus	
4 March	"Flowers"	Miley Cyrus	
11 March	"Flowers"	Miley Cyrus	
18 March	"Flowers"	Miley Cyrus	
25 March	"Flowers"	Miley Cyrus	
1 April	"Flowers"	Miley Cyrus	
8 April	"Flowers"	Miley Cyrus	
15 April	"Flowers"	Miley Cyrus	
22 April	"Flowers"	Miley Cyrus	
29 April	"Flowers"	Miley Cyrus	
6 May	"Flowers"	Miley Cyrus	
13 May	"Flowers"	Miley Cyrus	
20 May	"Flowers"	Miley Cyrus	
27 May	"Flowers"	Miley Cyrus	
3 June	"Flowers"	Miley Cyrus	
10 June	"Flowers"	Miley Cyrus	
17 June	"Tattoo"	Loreen	
24 June	"Tattoo"	Loreen	
1 July	"Tattoo"	Loreen	
8 July	"Tattoo"	Loreen	
15 July	"Tattoo"	Loreen	
22 July	"Tattoo"	Loreen	
29 July	"Dance the Night"	Dua Lipa	
5 August	"Dance the Night"	Dua Lipa	
12 August	"Dance the Night"	Dua Lipa	
19 August	"Dance the Night"	Dua Lipa	
26 August	"Dance the Night"	Dua Lipa	
2 September	"Dance the Night"	Dua Lipa	
9 September	"Dance the Night"	Dua Lipa	
16 September	"Dance the Night"	Dua Lipa	
23 September	"Dance the Night"	Dua Lipa	
30 September	"Dance the Night"	Dua Lipa	
7 October	"Dance the Night"	Dua Lipa	
14 October	"Dance the Night"	Dua Lipa	
21 October	"Dance the Night"	Dua Lipa	
28 October	"Si No Estás"	Iñigo Quintero	
4 November	"Si No Estás"	Iñigo Quintero	
11 November	"Si No Estás"	Iñigo Quintero	
18 November	"Si No Estás"	Iñigo Quintero	
25 November	"Si No Estás"	Iñigo Quintero	
2 December	"Strangers"	Kenya Grace	
9 December	"Si No Estás"	Iñigo Quintero	
16 December	"Gimme Love"	Sia	
23 December	"Gimme Love"	Sia	
30 December	"All I Want for Christmas Is You"	Mariah Carey	

Flanders ranking of most weeks at number 1
Position	Artist	Weeks #1
1	Miley Cyrus	16
2	Loreen	10
3	Pommelien Thijs	6
3	Cassö	6
3	Raye	6
3	D-Block Europe	6
4	Metejoor	3
4	Dua Lipa	3
5	Taylor Swift	2
5	Peggy Gou	2
6	Artiesten voor 12-12	1
6	Teddy Swims	1
6	Noah Kahan	1
6	Mariah Carey	1

Wallonia ranking of most weeks at number 1
Position	Artist	Weeks #1
1	Miley Cyrus	20
2	Dua Lipa	13
3	Loreen	6
3	Iñigo Quintero	6
4	Måneskin	2
4	Sia	2
5	David Guetta	1
5	Bebe Rexha	1
5	Kenya Grace	1
5	Mariah Carey	1

== See also ==
- List of number-one albums of 2023 (Belgium)
- 2023 in music
