= People Pt. 2 =

2023 single by Agust D

Single by Agust D featuring IU

from the album D-Day
- Language: Korean
- Released: April 7, 2023
- Genre: Pop; hip hop
- Length: 3:33
- Label: Big Hit
- Songwriters: Agust D; El Capitxn
- Producer: El Capitxn

Agust D singles chronology
"Daechwita" (2020)	"People Pt. 2" (2023)	"Haegeum" (2023)

IU singles chronology
"Ganadara" (2022)	"People Pt. 2" (2023)	"Love Wins All" (2024)

Music video
- People Pt. 2 on YouTube

"People Pt. 2" (Korean: 사람 Pt.2; RR: Saram Pt.2) is a song by South Korean rapper Agust D, better known as Suga of BTS, featuring South Korean singer IU. Released as a digital single on April 7, 2023, through Big Hit Music, the song serves as the first single from the rapper's debut studio album D-Day. Written by Agust D and El Capitxn, and produced by the latter, the song is a pop and hip hop track that discusses themes of loneliness and connection.

== Background ==
Originally titled "Sara" (사라)—saram (사람), which is Korean for "people", without the "M" (ㅁ) consonant—Suga created "People Pt. 2" in 2020, while working on his second mixtape as Agust D. The title was ultimately changed after friends he had asked to listen to the track misheard the name as sal-ah (살아), which means "live". An extension or follow-up to the track "People" from D-2, the song was conceived while thinking about how others would receive his music as Agust D. In an interview with Billboard, Suga described it as "kind of a trial to release this music under the name Agust D", stating that he was "a little bit worried about it". Wanting to "sync the person SUGA and Agust D", and bridge his mixtape with his official solo album, Suga knew he needed to make "a very pop song", and chose to feature South Korean singer IU, who he felt played an important role in making the song feel "less intense" and more "pop-focused". The two previously worked together on IU's 2020 single "Eight", which Suga co-wrote, produced, and featured on.

Completed before D-2 was finished, the song remained unreleased for three years as BTS-related promotional activities for "Dynamite" and "Butter" took precedent. In early 2023, a demo version was unintentionally made public by Suga's label; a behind-the-scenes video uploaded to YouTube, of the photoshoot for the rapper's Photo-Folio photobook, showed him listening to a guide for the song sung by bandmate Jungkook.

== Music and lyrics ==
A pop and hip-hop track "based on boom bap rhythms", the song was co-written by Agust D during the COVID-19 pandemic "when he 'couldn't do anything'" and thought he had "lost everything"; El Capitxn is credited as a co-writer and the song's producer. Where its predecessor "People" was self-reflective and examined the judgements of others, "People Pt. 2" focuses on "connection and fighting loneliness", though Suga has stated that both songs are not that different as "everybody can feel pain and agonized. It's the same with me. Whether it's me from BTS, SUGA, Min Yoongi, or Agust D, I always have that inside me too. People might see me as someone who wouldn't have any concerns or worries or that I don't feel any agony, but I feel those emotions too. I'm trying to find a way to fight those and overcome those too...I just wanted to show that I am this humane person. I am just a human."

A press release for the song described it as "talk[ing] about the endless relationships between people and the emotions felt in an Agust D way" that "harmonizes Suga's rapping and IU's clear voice into one." The song opens with "soulful vocals" from IU, "setting the emotional tone" for the track, followed by Suga rapping his verses in Korean. Translated lyrics provided on the song's music video show him exercising caution about "This thing called love", that "Maybe it's just a momentary list of emotions", and asking "What is it about loss that makes us so sad?" As the verses progress, he wonders "Will I be happy if I give up my greed?" Subsequent lines, such as "A half-illusion that can never be fulfilled / They say life's a struggle between resistance and submission / I say it’s a struggle against loneliness / If you can't hold it back, it's okay to cry", address the emotional contention that comes with being human and portray the rapper's belief that "everyone has this loneliness inside them until the moment they die", tying back to the keyword "loneliness" which served as the song's starting point.

== Release ==
In March 2023, South Korean media outlet SpoTV News reported that Suga and IU would be releasing a new collaboration soon. In a subsequent statement to Sports Today, Big Hit Music responded that it was "difficult to confirm" the claim. The following month, on April 2, the label announced the impending release of Suga's debut solo album D-Day, under his Agust D alias. On April 5, a promotional poster advertising a pre-release single from the album was shared across Big Hit's social media. The poster showed Suga playing a keyboard in what appeared to be a studio, surrounded by other instruments, with the single's title, "People Pt. 2", and April 7 release date written at the bottom; IU was also revealed as a featured artist on the song. The single was released as scheduled two days later.

== Commercial performance ==
"People Pt. 2" sold 4,132 downloads on its first day of availability in Japan, topping the daily issue of Oricon's Digital Singles Chart for April 7, 2023. Released partway through an ongoing tracking week, the song debuted in the top 10 of the subsequent weekly Digital chart issue (for the period dated April 3–9) at number eight, with 5,427 sales during that time.

The single entered several Billboard charts in the United States. It was the best-selling digital track of its release week with 18,000 downloads, topping the Digital Song Sales chart issue dated April 22, 2023, as well as the corresponding issues of the genre-specific Rap and World digital song sales charts. IU earned her 11th top-10 entry and second number one on the World chart, after "Eight", with "People Pt. 2". She also debuted atop the Emerging Artists chart for the first time. The single did not enter the Hot 100, but charted at number five on the Bubbling Under Hot 100. It additionally entered the Billboard Global 200 at number 24 and the Global Excl. US chart at number 16.

== Music video ==
An accompanying music was released simultaneously alongside the single on April 7. At a runtime of just over four minutes, the visual comprises footage of Agust D alone in his home, "deep in thought, journaling his words", "writing and recording the song", and "taking in breathtaking views", coupled with scenes of him working in his studio. IU does not appear in the video.

After the theatrical portion of the video ends, a brief black and white clip of Suga explaining the song's creation and the message behind its lyrics is shown.

== Live performances ==
Suga appeared on the April 10 episode of IU's Palette, a YouTube show hosted by IU, in promotion of the single. He performed "Eight", "People", and "People Pt. 2" for the first time, accompanied by a live band.

== Accolades ==
"People Pt. 2" received nominations for Best Rap & Hip Hop Performance and Song of the Year at the 2023 MAMA Awards and won the former.

== Charts ==
=== Weekly charts ===
Weekly chart performance
Chart (2023)	Peak position
Canada Digital Song Sales (Billboard)	10
Global 200 (Billboard)	24
Hungary (Single Top 40)	6
India International Singles (IMI)	7
Indonesia (Billboard)	21
Japan Hot 100 (Billboard)	99
Japan Digital Singles (Oricon)	8
New Zealand Hot Singles (RMNZ)	7
Singapore (RIAS)	23
South Korea (Circle)	14
UK Singles Downloads (Official Charts)	3
UK Singles Sales (OCC)	3
US Bubbling Under Hot 100 (Billboard)	5
US Digital Song Sales (Billboard)	1
US Rap Digital Song Sales (Billboard)	1
US World Digital Song Sales (Billboard)	1
Vietnam (Vietnam Hot 100)	6

=== Monthly charts ===
Monthly chart performance
Chart (2023)	Peak position
South Korea (Circle)	19

=== Year-end charts ===
Year-end chart performance
Chart (2023)	Position
South Korea (Circle)	89
