= The Rose: Come Back to Me =

2025 documentary directed by Eugene Yi

- Directed by: Eugene Yi
- Written by: David E. Simpson; Eugene Yi
- Produced by: Diane Quon; Sanjay Sharma; Milan Chakraborty; James Shin; Joe Plummer
- Starring: Woosung Sammy Kim; Dojoon Leo Park; Hajoon Dylan Lee; Jaehyeong Jeff Lee
- Cinematography: Richard Hama
- Edited by: David E. Simpson
- Music by: Chad Cannon
- Production companies: Quonco Productions; Marginal Mediaworks; Hybe America
- Distributed by: CJ 4DPlex
- Release dates: June 6, 2025 (Tribeca); February 13, 2026 (United States)
- Running time: 96 minutes
- Country: United States
- Languages: English; Korean

The Rose: Come Back to Me is a 2025 documentary film directed by Eugene Yi about the South Korean indie rock band The Rose.

The film premiered at the Tribeca Festival in June and also screened at the Busan International Film Festival.

== Synopsis ==
The documentary exhibits how a music underdog rises to the top of the industry by staying true to their beliefs, through team collaboration, and the healing power of music. The documentary centers mental health, perseverance, vulnerability, and creative rebirth as core themes of the production.

This documentary follows the individual paths of musicians Woosung Sammy Kim, Dojoon Leo Park, Hajoon Dylan Lee, and Taegyeom Jeff Lee and explains why they chose to pursue music and form a rock band. The group met during K-Pop training, before deciding to form their own group.

The documentary details their path from busking on the streets in Seoul to selling out Los Angeles’ Kia Forum in 2023, while fighting to preserve their individuality and voice. The arduous journey includes the group battling an agency that was trying to isolate Sammy as the star of the band, the pandemic, legal disputes, military service in Korea, and depression.) The documentary also features animation.

== Production ==
CJ 4DPLEX acquired worldwide rights to the documentary in 2025. It plans for a 2026 global theatrical release .

The Rose: Come Back to Me is produced by Diane Quon, Marginal MediaWorks’ Sanjay M. Sharma and Milan Chakraborty, HYBE AMERICA’s James Shin, and Wavelength’s Joe Plummer.

== Reception ==
On the review aggregator website Rotten Tomatoes, 100% of 11 critics' reviews are positive.

Kent Hill of Film Threat gave the film a score of 7.5 out of 10 and wrote, "For fans, The Rose: Come Back to Me is an essential document of The Rose's legacy. For newcomers, it's a powerful introduction to a band rewriting the rules of K-pop with grit, heart, and unshakable friendship."
