= D-Day (album) =

- Digital cover

Studio album by Agust D
- Released: April 21, 2023
- Recorded: 2020–2023
- Genres: Hip-hop; trap; drill; alternative rock
- Length: 32:10
- Languages: Korean; English
- Label: Big Hit
- Producers: Vincent "Invisible" Watson; 2Live; Agust D; El Capitxn; Pdogg

Agust D chronology
D-2 (2020)	D-Day (2023)

Singles from D-Day
- 1. "People Pt. 2" Released: April 7, 2023; 2. "Haegeum" Released: April 21, 2023

D-Day is the debut studio album by South Korean rapper Agust D, also known as Suga of BTS. It was released on April 21, 2023, through Big Hit Music, as the third installment in a trilogy of works that includes the mixtapes Agust D (2016) and D-2 (2020). Comprising 10 tracks, the album features appearances by BTS bandmate J-Hope, IU, Ryuichi Sakamoto, and Woosung of the Rose. Two singles were released in promotion of the project: "People Pt. 2" featuring IU on April 7, and "Haegeum", which premiered alongside the album. Music videos accompanied both singles, with a third released for the track "Amygdala" on April 24.

== Music and lyrics ==
=== Themes and composition ===
Filled with "thought-provoking social commentary and personal reflections", Agust D addresses themes of liberation—"from feeling a certain way...from letting the past and future...control us"—and freedom on D-Day. He ruminates on the meaning of both, whether they are "a blessing or a curse", and "encourages listeners to concentrate on focusing inward, instead of looking to the past at regrets or at the future with fear". Musically, the album features a diverse range of sounds and genres, including boom bap, "coats of Auto-Tune", alternative rock, and a piano sample from Japanese composer Ryuichi Sakamoto.

=== Songs ===
The titular opening track "D-Day" features "distorted guitar instrumentals" that "build up for a few seconds before launching straight into an intense trap flow." In English, Agust D raps the lyrics "Future's gonna be OK / OK, OK, look at the mirror and I see no pain" followed by "D-Day is coming, it's a fucking good day" in an "almost joyous" manner, "as if this feeling of contentedness is a revelation". He then expresses "a whirlwind of thoughts" that include "not wanting to be tied down to his past", reflected in lines such as "In a world full of hate / Hatе is even more unnecessary / Lotus flowers bloom brilliantly even in mud" and "Don't regret the past, don't be afraid of the future / I hope you can avoid getting hit and hurt enough."

The next track "Haegeum" is a heavy hip-hop song that includes the use of a South Korean traditional two-stringed fiddle called haegeum in its instrumentation—D-2's "Daechwita" also featured the instrument. Its title is a word play that references both the instrument and an interpretation of liberation specific to the song—"to advocate for freedom in a reality built on unspoken societal expectations and restrictions echoed in today's online culture". In Korean, Agust D asks listeners to question their own liberation ("What is it, exactly, that's been restricting us? / Maybe we do it to ourselves. Slaves to capitalism, slaves to money, slaves to hatred and prejudice") and the role they play in that of others ("Freedom of expression / Could be reason for somebody's death / Could you still consider that freedom?"), making a case for "doing away 'with the nonsense' that clutters online" and reality.

BTS bandmate J-Hope appears on the third track "Huh?!", a collaborative song that carries over some of the subject matter of "Haegeum". It opens with Agust D angrily rapping in part "What the shit do you know about me? Fuck that shit you think you know 'bout me". Built on a "shadowy drill foundation", both rappers trade verses calling out the spread of misconceptions and misinformation, particularly in regard to themselves, online and in the media ("Millions of news coverage and gossip, the villain in this age of information"). J-Hope's verse is performed with his voice dropped into a "menacing near-whisper", offering an aural contrast to the more "urgent delivery" of his counterpart. The opening refrain is repeated throughout the song's progression and again at its end.

Agust D showcases his vocal abilities on the fourth track "Amygdala", a "guitar-laden, harmony-rich" song whose lyrics recall various painful moments throughout his lifetime, such as his mother's heart surgery, a hospital visit after his birth, an accident during his teenage years that resulted in a shoulder injury, and his father's eventual diagnosis with liver cancer. He sings, "Those things I never asked for / Those things that are out of my hands / Imma put it back" and pleads in a "raw and raspy" voice with his amygdala, the brain's trauma processing center, to "Please rescue me, please rescue me / My amygdala / Please pull me up, please pull me up". Layers of Auto-Tune over the track's "murky rock riffs and clipping beats" serve to enhance "the cracks of emotion." After questioning the purpose of his past suffering, the rapper concludes, "What didn't kill me only made me stronger / I'm blooming like a lotus flower now", suggesting that his trauma led "to a more resilient rebirth" and emphasizing the album's underlying "connecting thread", the "idea of pushing forward through the difficult moments". "Amygdala" serves as a "transitional point" on the album, as softer, brighter tracks follow.

The album's fifth track, "SDL", features guitar and "snatches of organ" in its instrumentation. Agust D questions "whether nostalgia for lost love can be confused with love itself". Rolling Stone's Maura Johnston described the song as a "smooth groove" with "a contemplative edge".

== Critical reception ==
Professional ratings
Aggregate scores
Source	Rating
Metacritic	89/100
Review scores
Source	Rating
AllMusic	4/5 stars
Consequence	91/100
NME	5/5 stars
Rolling Stone	80/100

D-Day received critical acclaim upon release. At Metacritic, which assigns a normalized rating out of 100 to reviews from professional publications, the album received an average score of 89 based on four reviews, indicating "universal acclaim".

Rhian Daly of NME gave the album a five-star rating, describing it as "rich and varied" and "inimitably Suga – or Agust D", with the rapper proving himself "an unstoppable, thought-provoking force". Noting the change from anger and "those old barbed emotions" in many of the rapper's previous solo works, Daly wrote that on D-Day, Agust D instead "[set] himself free and stepp[ed] fully into the role of a wise social commentator and – at times – protector...wrapping up his trilogy in peak form." She chose "Amygdala" as the standout track on the album, particularly for its "heart-wrenching" subject matter and the way the rapper addressed his painful past. Like Daly, Consequence's Mary Siroky also singled out "Amygdala" as one of the album's highlights, alongside "Snooze" and "Haegeum", calling it "truly some of SUGA's best work, and certainly his best work from a vocal perspective". Conversely, she felt that "SDL" and "People Pt.2" were "less memorable parts of the album" that "don't stick as much as others in the grand scheme of the record". Siroky opined that "the clarity [Suga] has when it comes to his art", derived from years of honing his skills as an artist and a musician, was what took the "record from good to great" and that even for non-Korean speaking listeners, sonically, "the story he set out to tell ends up linear and cohesive, remarkably so". She concluded that while Agust D's time had seemingly come to an end within the context of the trilogy, the album served "as the kind of goodbye the character deserves" and "is a body of work people will turn to for years to come."

== Commercial performance ==
According to the Hanteo Chart, D-Day sold 1,072,311 copies (Note: 918,236 copies of the standard version of the album and 154,075 copies of the Weverse Albums version) worldwide on its first day, surpassing the record previously set by Jimin of BTS, who sold 1,021,532 copies (Note: 768,575 copies of the standard version of the album and 252,957 copies of the Weverse Albums version) of his debut solo album Face on its release day in March. Agust D became the second Korean solo artist in Hanteo Chart history, after Jimin, to surpass one million first day sales.

In Japan, the album debuted at number one on the daily Oricon Albums Chart, with 111,621 copies sold on April 21, 2023. Eight of the album's tracks debuted in the top 20 of the corresponding daily issue of the Digital Singles Chart: "Haegeum" at number three with 3,524 sales; "Snooze" at number 13; "Huh?!" at number 14; "D-Day" at number 15; "Life Goes On" at number 17; "Amygdala" at number 18; "SDL" at number 19; and "Polar Night" at number 20.

In the United States, D-Day debuted at number two on the Billboard 200 with 140,000 album-equivalent units, including 122,000 pure album sales (90% of which were CD sales), marking his first top 10 album in the US. In its first week, D-Day sold over 118,000 copies, ranking fourth among the fastest-selling rap albums in the US over the past decade and making it one of only six rap albums in the past ten years to have sold more than 100,000 copies in their debut week.

== Accolades ==
In October 2023, D-Day received a nomination for Album of the Year at the MAMA Awards while "People Pt. 2" was nominated in the Best Rap & Hip Hop Performance and Song of the Year categories. In November, it was nominated for the Million Top 10 award at the Melon Music Awards. The following month, D-Day was nominated in the Album division at the 38th Golden Disc Awards.

=== Year-end lists ===
Critics' rankings for D-Day
Publication	Accolade	Rank	Ref.
Paste	The 20 Best K-pop Albums of 2023	7	
Genius	Best K-Pop Albums of 2023	7	
Billboard	The 20 Best K-pop Albums of 2023	8	
Tracklist	The 15 Best International Albums and EPs of 2023	10	
NPR	Listeners' Favorite Albums of 2023	14	
Consequence	The 50 Best Albums of 2023	27	
NME	The Best Albums of 2023	38	
Rolling Stone	The 100 Best Albums of 2023	69	
AllMusic	Favorite Rap & Hip-Hop Albums of 2023	—N/a	
PopCrush	Best Pop Albums of 2023	—N/a	
L'Éclaireur Fnac	K-pop Albums of the Year	—N/a	

Critics' rankings for D-Day tracks
Publication	Track	Accolade	Rank	Ref.
Paste	Snooze	The 20 Best K-pop Songs of 2023	1	
Genius	Snooze	Best K-Pop B-Sides of 2023	1	
Elle India	Haegeum	Top 10 K-Pop Songs Of 2023	7	
Dazed	Polar Night	The 50 Best K-pop Tracks of 2023	9	
Time Out	Snooze	The 23 Best Songs of 2023	16	
Consequence	Amygdala	The 200 Best Songs of 2023	92	
Los Angeles Times	Haegeum	The 100 Best Songs of 2023	—N/a	
Rolling Stone India	Haegeum	10 Best K-Pop Songs of 2023	—N/a	
Bandwagon Asia	Snooze	Top Collaborations of 2023	—N/a	

== Track listing ==
D-Day track listing
No.	Title	Writer(s)	Producer(s)	Length
1.	"D-Day"	Agust D; Vincent "Invincible" Watson; 2Live	Watson; 2Live	3:31
2.	"Haegeum" (해금)	Agust D	Agust D	2:48
3.	"Huh?!" (featuring J-Hope)	Agust D; El Capitxn; J-Hope	Agust D; El Capitxn	3:03
4.	"Amygdala"	Agust D; El Capitxn	El Capitxn	4:11
5.	"SDL"	Agust D; El Capitxn	Agust D; El Capitxn	2:51
6.	"People Pt. 2" (featuring IU)	Agust D; El Capitxn	El Capitxn	3:33
7.	"Polar Night" (Korean: 극야; RR: Geugya)	Agust D; El Capitxn; Kang Seung-won	Agust D; El Capitxn	2:45
8.	"Interlude: Dawn"	Agust D; El Capitxn	Agust D; El Capitxn	1:45
9.	"Snooze" (featuring Ryuichi Sakamoto and Woosung of the Rose)	Agust D; El Capitxn; Sakamoto; Woosung	El Capitxn	4:24
10.	"Life Goes On"	Agust D; El Capitxn; Pdogg; RM; Blvsh; Chris James; Antonina Armato; J-Hope	El Capitxn	3:17
Total length:				32:10

Notes

- "Polar Night" contains portions of "About Thirty" (서른즈음에) written by Kang Seung-won.
- "Life Goes On" samples the song of the same name by BTS from their 2020 studio album Be.

== Personnel ==
Credits adapted from the liner notes of D-Day. Excludes songwriting and production credits already cited above.

- 2Live – all instruments (track 1)
- Adora – background vocals (tracks 5, 10)
- Agust D – vocal and rap arrangement (tracks 1–7, 9, 10), record engineering (tracks 1–7, 9, 10), keyboard (tracks 2, 4, 5, 8, 10), synthesizer (tracks 2, 5, 10), background vocals (tracks 2, 3),
- CALi (Vendors) – background vocals (tracks 4, 10)
- Bobby Campbell – mix engineering (tracks 2, 4)
- El Capitxn – digital editing (tracks 1–7, 9, 10), keyboard (tracks 3–10), synthesizer (tracks 3–5, 7, 9, 10), drum (track 6), string (tracks 8, 9)
- Chris Gehringer – mastering engineering
- Ghstloop – drum (track 6)
- IU – background vocals (track 6), vocal and rap arrangement (track 6)
- J-Hope – background vocals (track 3), vocal and rap arrangement (track 3), record engineering (track 3)
- June – background vocals (tracks 1, 4, 9)
- Jung Woo Young – mix engineering (tracks 8, 9)
- Lee Joon-hee – bass (track 7)
- Ken Lewis – mix engineering (tracks 3, 7)
- Louis (Vendors) – string (track 8, 9), guitar (track 8–10)
- James F. Reynolds – mix engineering (track 6)
- Ryuichi Sakamoto – keyboard (track 9)
- Son – record engineering (track 6)
- Vincent "Invincible" Watson – all instruments (track 1)
- Yang Ga – mix engineering (tracks 1, 5, 10)
- Young – guitar (track 7), record engineering (track 7)
- Zenur (Vendors) – guitar (tracks 4–8, 10)

== Charts ==
=== Weekly charts ===
Weekly chart performance
Chart (2023)	Peak position
Australian Albums (ARIA)	4
Austrian Albums (Ö3 Austria)	2
Belgian Albums (Ultratop Flanders)	8
Belgian Albums (Ultratop Wallonia)	1
Canadian Albums (Billboard)	9
Croatian International Albums (HDU)	6
Danish Albums (Hitlisten)	25
Dutch Albums (Album Top 100)	16
Finnish Albums (Suomen virallinen lista)	13
French Albums (SNEP)	1
German Albums (Offizielle Top 100)	3
Greek Albums (IFPI)	7
Hungarian Albums (MAHASZ)	2
Irish Albums (IRMA)	72
Italian Albums (FIMI)	7
Japanese Albums (Oricon)	2
Japanese Combined Albums (Oricon)	2
Japanese Hot Albums (Billboard Japan)	2
Lithuanian Albums (AGATA)	3
New Zealand Albums (RMNZ)	7
Polish Albums (ZPAV)	1
Portuguese Albums (AFP)	1
South Korean Albums (Circle)	1
Spanish Albums (Promusicae)	6
Swedish Albums (Sverigetopplistan)	55
Swiss Albums (Schweizer Hitparade)	2
UK Albums (Official Charts)	41
UK R&B Albums (Official Charts)	2
US Billboard 200	2
US Top Rap Albums (Billboard)	1
US World Albums (Billboard)	1

=== Monthly charts ===
Monthly chart performance
Chart (2023)	Peak position
Japanese Albums (Oricon)	3
South Korean Albums (Circle)	3

=== Year-end charts ===
Year-end chart performance
Chart (2023)	Position
Hungarian Albums (MAHASZ)	93
Japanese Albums (Oricon)	40
Japanese Hot Albums (Billboard Japan)	39
South Korean Albums (Circle)	27
US World Albums (Billboard)	9

== Certifications ==
Certifications
Region	Certification	Certified units/sales
Japan (RIAJ)	Gold	100,000^{^}
South Korea (KMCA)	Million	1,000,000^{^}
^{^} Shipments figures based on certification alone.

== Release history ==
D-Day release history
Region	Date	Format	Version	Label	Ref.
United States	April 21, 2023	CD; digital download; streaming	Regular; Weverse US exclusive	Big Hit	
Various	April 21, 2023	CD; digital download; streaming	Regular; Weverse Albums	Big Hit	
Japan	April 22, 2023	CD; digital download; streaming	Regular	Big Hit	
United States	May 11, 2023	Digital download; streaming	Weverse Albums	Big Hit	
Various	July 5, 2024	LP	Regular	Big Hit	

== See also ==
- List of 2023 albums
- List of best-selling albums in South Korea
- List of Circle Album Chart number ones of 2023
- List of number-one albums of 2023 (Belgium)
- List of number-one hits of 2023 (France)
- List of number-one albums of 2023 (Portugal)
