= Jentry Chau vs. the Underworld =

2024 television series

- Release poster
- Genre: Action; Supernatural; Comedy drama
- Created by: Echo Wu
- Showrunner: Echo Wu
- Voices of: Ali Wong; Lori Tan Chinn; Bowen Yang
- Opening theme: "Flame", performed by Katseye
- Composer: Brian H. Kim
- Country of origin: United States
- Original language: English
- No. of seasons: 1
- No. of episodes: 13

Production
- Executive producers: Echo Wu; Ali Wong; Aron Eli Coleite; Chris Prynoski; Shannon Prynoski; Ben Kalina; Antonio Canobbio
- Editor: Amy Blaisdell
- Running time: 26–32 minutes
- Production companies: Buji Productions; Trespassers Will Inc.; Lightbulb Farm Productions; Titmouse, Inc.; Netflix Animation Studios

Original release
- Network: Netflix
- Release: December 5, 2024

Jentry Chau vs. The Underworld is an American animated supernatural-action television series created by Echo Wu and produced by Buji Productions, Trespassers Will Inc., Lightbulb Farm Productions, Titmouse, Inc., and Netflix Animation Studios. The series was released on December 5, 2024, on Netflix, and is set in a Texas suburb, where Jentry Chau, a Chinese-American teen who has been suppressing magical powers, rediscovers them on her 16th birthday and learns that demonic forces are hunting her for them. The show explores themes of family secrets, identity, and the consequences of choices made by past generations, particularly in relation to Jentry's parents.

== Voice cast and characters ==
=== Main ===
- Ali Wong as Jentry Chau, a Chinese-American teen with powerful mystical abilities who is brought back to the Texas town where she grew up, from a boarding school in Seoul, South Korea, to protect her from Mr. Cheng, a powerful Mogui who seeks to steal Jentry's powers.
  - Micaiah Chen as young Jentry
  - Cristina Milizia as baby Jentry
- Lori Tan Chinn as Flora "Gugu" Chau, Jentry's great-aunt and the woman who raised her. A skilled Daoist priestess who teaches Jentry how to use her abilities and navigate the mystical world. She is killed by Mr. Cheng in the first episode, but returns as a ghost.
- Bowen Yang as Ed, a jiangshi who was sent to kill Jentry by Mr. Cheng, but was defeated and decided to stay with her after being abandoned by him. He later became Jentry's sidekick for the rest of the series.

=== Recurring ===
- AJ Beckles as Michael Olé, Jentry's childhood friend and love interest.
- Woosung Kim as Kit, a painted skin demon posing as a human teenager who falls in love with Jentry.
- Cristina Milizia as Stella Gonzales, Michael's girlfriend who befriends Jentry.
- Greg Chun as Mr. Cheng, a man possessed by a mogui who has been targeting Jentry for her powers in order to revive his deceased daughter Xiao Lan.
- Kenton Chen as the Mogui, an evil, parasitic Chinese spirit.
- Sean Allan Krill as VP Wheeler, the paranoid vice principal of Riverfork High School.
- Lucy Liu as Moonie Chau, Jentry's mother.
- Jimmy O. Yang as Peng Chau, Jentry's father.
- Sheng Wang as Zhongkui, the guardian who resides in the Zhong and prison warden of Bixi.
- Michaela Dietz as Tokki, Jentry's boarding school friend from Seoul, South Korea.
- Suzie Yeung as Solar Tang, a bounty hunter.
- Crystal J. Huang as Iris, Jentry's grandmother and Gugu's sister.
- Kaiji Tang as Ox-Head, a demon with the head of an ox and a guardian of Diyu along with Horse-Face.
- Stephen Fu as Horse-Face, a demon with the face of a horse and a guardian of Diyu along with Ox-Head.

== Episodes ==
No.	Title	Directed by	Written by	Original release date
1	"Worst Birthday Ever"	Alexandria Kwan; Natasha Presler-Wicke; Hyunjoo Song	Echo Wu	December 5, 2024
Jentry Chau celebrates her 16th birthday in Seoul when she is suddenly attacked by a jiangshi named Ed, who cautions a mogui named Mr. Cheng is targeting her. During the fight, Jentry reawakens to her dormant fire powers, surprising her. Jentry's great-aunt Gugu intervenes and pacifies Ed with a talisman as she tells Jentry they are flying back to her hometown of Riverfork, Texas to deal with Mr. Cheng; Jentry reluctantly accepts despite holding bad memories of the town and trains to control her powers. While refamiliarizing herself with Riverfork, Jentry reunites with childhood friend Michael Olé. Jentry and Gugu prepare to fight Mr. Cheng, but Jentry worries she might burn Riverfork again when Mr. Cheng arrives. Gugu defends Jentry from the spirit and is killed. A vengeful Jentry fully awakens to her abilities and defeats Mr. Cheng; as she cries, she sees Gugu's ghost, making her realize she has awakened to her third eye. Gugu expresses being proud of Jentry before Ed points out a portal being formed.
2	"Fifteen Minutes of Flame"	Jackie Cole	Saba Saghafi; Tiffany So	December 5, 2024
Upon realizing the portal leads to the underworld, Ed and Gugu implore Jentry to close it when a man-eating monster escapes, forcing the group to kill it. Ed asks Gugu and Jentry if he can stay with them; Gugu also explains Mr. Cheng was targeting Jentry for her ability to resurrect the dead. As they plan their next move, two spirits—Ox-Head and Horse-Face—emerge from the portal and track Jentry's footsteps to Gugu's house, demanding Ed and Gugu for her location. Meanwhile, Jentry enrolls at Riverfork's high school, where she meets the paranoid vice principal Wheeler and students Stella Gonzales and Kit. Jentry learns that Michael is Stella's boyfriend; Jentry also tries to control her unstable powers but fails, causing a fire at the school. Ox-Head and Horse-Face see the smoke and teleport to the school, chasing the lone Jentry before Ed and Gugu arrive to assist her. When the spirits capture Gugu, Jentry is forced to use her powers and threatens them by sharing she burned Riverfork previously, unaware that the school's PA system is enabled; the spirits back off and warn Jentry to close the portal. Later, after laying Gugu's body to rest, Jentry sees her mother's ghost.
3	"Girl with a Pearl"	Natalie Wetzig; Mari Yang	Brittany Jo Flores	December 5, 2024
Jentry becomes ostracized at school after her revelation as she continues to see visions of her parents Moonie and Peng, worrying Gugu as she assumes it is the work of a shén clam. Jentry discovers the clam as it sticks its pearl onto her; she hides the pearl from Gugu. The next day, as Gugu is taught telekinesis by the house ghosts, Jentry sees numerous visions of her parents as the pearl continues to control her, causing her to reveal her powers to Kit. Mr. Cheng eventually reveals he was manipulating her; Jentry suffers an emotional breakdown and wreaks havoc inside the diner, injuring Michael. Gugu comes to her aid and uses her telekinetic powers to save Jentry from falling debris and free her from the pearl's control. Jentry apologizes to Gugu and pleads to find another way to close the portal that does not involve her powers. Unwilling to make a compromise, Gugu calls an associate—a bounty hunter from Jentry's visions named Solar Tang—to help further her potential.
4	"Forget the Alamo"	Alexandria Kwan	Peter Chen	December 5, 2024
30 years ago, a bullied boy named Billy visited the Alamo and requested the spirits of its battle to be his friends; the spirits proclaimed they would teach respect to those who wronged Billy. In the present, Jentry prepares for a field trip to the Alamo, with Ed coming along, and sulks in despair with Michael and Kit avoiding her after the recent events. Meanwhile, Gugu confronts Mr. Cheng, who taunts her for not telling Jentry the fate of her parents. The class arrives at the Alamo, with Billy, now its tour guide, greeting them, though the class ignores him. During the trip, several students become possessed by the spirits under Billy's orders; Jentry intervenes and manages to save Michael and Kit as they hide in the chapel with Ed. The boys work with Jentry to acquire a cannon until Billy interrupts them, threatening to kill Kit. Jentry stalls enough to shoot the cannon, disturbing the spirits and freeing the students; a spirit named Zhongkui arrives and imprisons the spirits, leaving Billy alone. Kit thanks her and gives his contact information, much to Jentry's delight.
5	"Some Gui My Prince Will Come"	Jackie Cole	Jade Chang	December 5, 2024
A montage of Michael and Kit's routines is shown, with Michael feeling pressured by his parents and Stella to continue as a football player despite having dreams of playing the flute and Kit demonstrating his powers as a painted skin demon. Mr. Cheng visits Kit and asks about his progress with Jentry, revealing Kit is an accomplice; Mr. Cheng demands he acquire her powers immediately if he wishes to become human. Both boys encounter Jentry trying to defeat a demon with Ed at school; through their meetings with her, they begin to rethink their decisions. Michael tries to take her advice to heart and opens up to Stella about his aspirations, but it backfires as Stella breaks up with him; he is further left downhearted upon seeing Jentry kiss Kit. Afraid of draining her qi and killing her, Kit rejects her advances, hurting Jentry's feelings. Kit later heads home and severs ties with Mr. Cheng as the spirit begins to manipulate Michael's thoughts and shows him a premonition of Jentry in danger.
6	"All's Fair in Love and War"	Alexandria Kwan	Saba Saghafi; Tiffany So	December 5, 2024
Jentry, Ed, and Gugu travel to the state fair. Jentry asks Gugu for information about a being Ox-Head and Horse-Face warned her called the Yellow Emperor, though Gugu avoids the question. The group spends their time enjoying the fair, unaware that Mr. Cheng is watching over the activities. Jentry sees Gugu talking with Solar Tang, whom she recognized from her visions, leading to a chase while Mr. Cheng sows chaos in the fair. Jentry corners Solar Tang and demands to know more about the Yellow Emperor before they are interrupted, causing Solar Tang's staff to grant the fair's mascot sentience and it destroys the fair. Jentry works with her friends to destroy the mascot, and when Gugu arrives, Jentry expresses her anger at Gugu for lying to her. She razes the mascot and is saved by Kit, during which he reveals his true form to her. Jentry turns away and rejects him, disheartening Kit. After arriving home, Gugu reconciles with Jentry by taking her to learn the truth about her parents.
7	"Into the Zhong"	Natalie Wetzig; Mari Yang	Brittany Jo Flores	December 5, 2024
Jentry follows Gugu to the Zhong and they arrive at Bixi, a prison for ghosts, where Jentry reunites with the ghosts of her parents. After asking her parents of their fate, Jentry and Gugu return to the living realm where they confront Kit and Ed while they are disposing of a demon. Jentry assists in dealing with the demon and successfully closes the portal. Later, Jentry infiltrates Bixi with Ed to break her parents free but discovers that a pair of bakeneko was impersonating them, realizing that Gugu lied to her again. After a ghost gives Jentry a pearl necklace, Zhongkui learns of the break-in, prompting Jentry and Ed to escape. The ghost possesses Zhongkui long enough for Jentry and Ed to return to the living realm before being punished; Jentry discovers the ghost is her grandmother Iris. Determined to learn the truth, she wears the necklace and sees a memory of her parents stealing a robe with mythical powers originally belonging to the Yellow Emperor under Mr. Cheng's orders, forcing a desperate Gugu to transfer its powers onto an infant Jentry, shocked that her powers was never "born with" and enraged that Gugu lied and manipulated her for years.
8	"Fifteen Finger Discount"	Jackie Cole	Peter Chen	December 5, 2024
Jentry continues to watch the memory, eventually seeing Mr. Cheng kill her parents when Gugu attempts to deceive him with the powerless robe. Horrified by the memory, Jentry wants to return to a normal life when Kit messages her. She seeks his assistance in removing her powers and transferring them back to the robe. Jentry, Ed, and Kit, wearing a disguise of Jentry, return to Gugu's house; Kit distracts Gugu while Jentry and Ed infiltrate the training grounds to find the robe. Gugu becomes suspicious of Kit acting as the false Jentry as Michael visits the house to invite Jentry to prom; Kit rejects his invite, making Gugu suspect him further. Gugu realizes the ruse as Jentry finds the robe and begins transferring her powers. Gugu tries to explain the robe's destructive powers and how she accidentally killed Iris when she used it, but her pleas fall on deaf ears as it do not change the fact Gugu used Jentry and lied to her for so long, Jentry completes the transfer, rendering her powerless. Gugu, now invisible to Jentry, possesses multiple people and tries to reach out to her, but Jentry leaves in anger as Gugu is imprisoned by Zhongkui for going against the realm's rules.
9	"Everyone Wins"	Alexandria Kwan	Jade Chang	December 5, 2024
After learning Ed had recorded her breakdown while in her demon form, Jentry severs ties with him, offended he had used her to further his popularity. Jentry travels to Stella's house, who apologizes for treating her harshly and lets Jentry know she will help her in adjusting to normal life. That night, Michael experiences a hallucination of him killing Jentry. At school, Kit asks out Jentry to prom as a show of appreciation for assisting in retrieving the robe but is declined as she meets with Michael and accepts his invitation, shocking Kit; Michael opens up to Jentry on his hallucination. Kit begins to harass Jentry, leading her to vehemently reject his advances. Meanwhile, Ed and the house ghosts attempt to break out Gugu, but they fail and are punished by Zhongkui. After Jentry leaves Gugu's house to attend Michael's football game, Kit steals the robe and gives it to Mr. Cheng. Fully powered by the robe, Mr. Cheng successfully resurrects his dead daughter Xiao Lan, as Wheeler tries to expose Jentry for her past actions during the game.
10	"A Night with the Stars"	Mari Yang; Natalie Wetzig	Echo Wu; James Hamilton	December 5, 2024
A hundred years ago, the human Cheng sought to resurrect his daughter from the afterlife, forcing himself to become the vessel of a mogui. In the present, Mr. Cheng gives the robe to Xiao Lan, but she panics by opening portals to the underworlds of various mythologies—including one during the game—in an attempt to find her own, causing chaos in Riverfork. Jentry, Michael, and Stella travel to Gugu's house to acquire weapons and encounter Kit, who expresses remorse for assisting Mr. Cheng. Noticing the chaos, Zhongkui frees Gugu and her allies and they join Jentry in fighting the monsters; they establish a truce with Mr. Cheng to retrieve Xiao Lan. Jentry calms her down, closing the portals and removing the robe. Mr. Cheng betrays and fights Jentry for the robe; seeing Jentry wearing it, he fatally stabs her. However, he discovers a disguised Kit sacrificed himself, allowing Jentry to regain her powers and defeat him, freeing the human Cheng who later dies of old age. Stella pacifies the mogui and they return Xiao Lan's soul to the underworld. After Jentry pays her respects to Kit, the mogui reveals he had not killed her mother Moonie and offers a deal to reunite them.
11	"Good Intentions"	Alexandria Kwan	Echo Wu; James Hamilton	December 5, 2024
Jentry reaches out her hand to agree to his deal when Ox-Head and Horse-Face step in and imprison the mogui. A month later, Jentry's efforts to locate Moonie fail to find leads. She shares to Gugu on infiltrating the underworld to break the mogui out, which Gugu objects as she tries to take more responsibility to protect Jentry. Against her orders, Jentry and Ed travel to the underworld—with Gugu following—and find the mogui where they interrogate him as the realm's guardians are alerted by her break-in. The mogui convinces Jentry to become its vessel to fight the guardians and find a way out, much to Gugu's horror; the mogui slowly influences Jentry's thoughts and shows Moonie's whereabouts. After returning to the living realm, Jentry pulls out the mogui to prevent his influence spreading before he leaves and thanks her for gaining her qi. Arriving back to the underworld, the mogui possesses Ox-Head and kills Horse-Face, pinning Jentry as his killer to the guardians before requesting they bring the soul of her father Peng.
12	"Moonie Phases"	Jackie Cole	Ryan Harer; Tanchelle "Nikki" Hudgens	December 5, 2024
Jentry travels to Moonie's location and they reunite. Moonie recounts how after Mr. Cheng took her memories, she relocated to Dallas out of guilt for her actions and started a new life, though she still spied on a young Jentry and Gugu. When Jentry recognized Moonie, she was frightened and her fire powers awakened, burning Riverfork. Jentry hesitates on returning Moonie's memories out of concern of reawakening past trauma, though Moonie accepts for a second chance to be her mother; she regains her memories with the help of Gugu, though she expresses her frustration to her on past events. Meanwhile, the school is preparing for Lock-In as Stella attempts to look for chaperones, where Jentry elects Moonie as a chaperone; they later bond and open up on their complicated relationship with Gugu. A soul then lures Moonie to the cemetery where she is attacked by the mogui, who asks for Jentry's powers in exchange for freeing Peng from torture. Moonie forcefully accepts, and she is possessed by the mogui. After Jentry leaves Gugu's house, the mogui-possessed Moonie fatally wounds Gugu and later arrives to the Lock-In, intent on retrieving Jentry's powers.
13	"Lock-In"	Stanley Von Medvey	James Hamilton; Echo Wu	December 5, 2024
The Lock-In begins in earnest as Jentry announces she is moving back to Seoul with Moonie, unaware that Mog-Moonie is letting in the underworld's guardians. Gugu quickly travels to the school as it is transported to the underworld. Jentry and Michael go to the band room and argue and as Jentry is leaving the band room they kiss. Mog-Moonie implores Jentry to give up her powers, which she declines; Mog-Moonie reveals itself to her, and the attack begins. Jentry and Michael try to free Moonie from the mogui as Ed and Stella transport the school back to the living realm with the help of Gugu. Mog-Moonie stabs Jentry and pulls her soul to gain her powers before being stopped by Gugu, tying her down with the cloth wrapping her wound. As the mogui taunts Gugu, she possesses Moonie and frees her from his control, allowing Moonie to forgive her, and Gugu uses the cloth to wrap Jentry's wound. The mogui attempts to escape before being captured by Jentry, who burns him to death. She sees Gugu disappearing and tries to save her, but Gugu stops her before expressing her content and love on seeing Jentry mature; Jentry uses the pearls as a way to remember her and she passes away. Three weeks later, Jentry moves back to Seoul with Moonie and Ed and discovers Gugu remade the necklace she gifted to Jentry on her birthday, which she wears in memory of her.

== Production ==
The series was first unveiled by Netflix in March 2023, along with a first look and voice cast with Echo Wu as showrunner. Wong and Aron Eli Coleite serve as executive producers, with Chris Prynoski, Shannon Prynoski, Antonio Canobbio and Ben Kalina, also serving as exec producers from Titmouse. Wu told the South China Morning Post that the series is "a love letter" to her childhood and the publication noted that neighborhoods and monuments in Riverfork resemble those in Dallas, Texas, where Wu grew up, and that some furniture in Gugu's house "is based on pieces that were in Wu's parents' home." She also revealed that she started pitching the show in 2020, but traced "some of the ideas...to Los Angeles in 2017." Kimmy Yam of NBC News interviewed Wu, who said that monsters from Chinese folklore are used to represent the frightening realities of adolescence, telling Yam, "it never felt like Jentry was scared to do monsters. She was scared to talk to boys" and noted that Avatar: The Last Airbender was an inspiration, wanting to create a series "kids could watch with their parents and parents could authentically enjoy." In another interview, with Collider, Wong compared the series to X-Men: The Animated Series and Avatar: The Last Airbender, explained how she figured out the right voice for Jentry, and said she loved the "image of the painted-skin creature so much" while noted they had a cultural consultant on the series.

== Music ==
A double disc soundtrack was also released alongside the show on December 5. The soundtrack features the series' score by Brian Kim and original songs from various music acts such as Jessi, eaJ, and Katseye, with the latter performing its theme song "Flame".

== Release ==
Jentry Chau vs. The Underworld was released on Netflix on December 5, 2024. The first 5 episodes were leaked beforehand in August.

== Reception ==
=== Critical response ===
On the review aggregator website Rotten Tomatoes reported a 100% approval rating, based on 9 critic reviews.

Petrana Radulovic of Polygon praised the "bright, bold colors and character designs, compelling character relationships, and...action sequences," and how showrunner Echo Wu emphasized the "wonderfully weird" in the series, whether paranormal or realistic (including teenage romance), and asserts that unlike American Dragon: Jake Long and The Life and Times of Juniper Lee, which she says "primarily prioritized Western mythology," this series emphasizes Chinese mythology instead. In another review, she said the show's "Texas setting combined with the Chinese folklore" adds a unique element to the show. Amaya Rose of Collider recommended the series to fans of Gravity Falls and The Owl House, calling it a "teen horror series racked with anime aesthetics and eerie paranormal properties," and praising the soundtrack as "energetic" and compared Jentry to Star Butterfly in Star vs. the Forces of Evil.

Charles Pulliam-Moore of The Verge argued that the series riffs off "signature beats" of Buffy the Vampire Slayer and says that the series wants viewers to realize there is more to telling relatable and "culturally specific stories" than just putting some "characters of color onscreen" and says it would be great to see what the show's crew might want for a second part of the series. Laura Babiak of the Observer described the series as "stellar", consistently humorous, creative, and an "audiovisual feast," and praised it for effectively juggling teen drama and mature themes and making Jentry's journey relatable.

=== Accolades ===
Accolades received by Jentry Chau vs. The Underworld
Award	Date of ceremony	Category	Recipient(s)	Result	Ref.
Annie Awards	February 8, 2025	Outstanding Achievement for Character Design in an Animated Television / Broadcast Production	Kal Athannassov (for "Pilot")	Nominated	
Annie Awards	February 8, 2025	Outstanding Achievement for Music in an Animated Television/Broadcast Production	Brian H. Kim (for "Lock-In")	Nominated	
Children's and Family Emmy Awards	March 1–2, 2026	Outstanding Writing for a Children's or Young Teen Animated Series	"Worst Birthday Ever"	Nominated	
Children's and Family Emmy Awards	March 1–2, 2026	Outstanding Directing for an Animated Series	"Worst Birthday Ever"	Nominated	
Children's and Family Emmy Awards	March 1–2, 2026	Outstanding Show Open	Jentry Chau vs. The Underworld	Won	
Children's and Family Emmy Awards	March 1–2, 2026	Outstanding Individual Achievement in Animation – Character Design	Kaloyan Athannassov	Won	
TCA Awards	August 20, 2025	Outstanding Achievement in Youth Programming	Jentry Chau vs. The Underworld	Nominated	

== Other media ==
On October 27, 2026 at LightBox Expo, it was announced that a graphic novel adaptation is in development, with Echo Wu as writer and Kal Athannassov as illustrator.
