= List of number-one albums of 2023 (Belgium) =

The Belgian Albums Chart, divided into the two main regions Flanders and Wallonia, ranks the best-performing albums in Belgium, as compiled by Ultratop.

== Flanders ==
List of number-one albums of 2023 in Flanders
Issue date	Album	Artist	Reference
7 January	SOS	Camille	
14 January	SOS	Camille	
21 January	SOS	Camille	
28 January	Rush!	Måneskin	
4 February	SOS	Camille	
11 February	SOS	Camille	
18 February	Als je voor me staat	Jaap Reesema	
25 February	How to Replace It	Deus	
4 March	How to Replace It	Deus	
11 March	Rush!	Måneskin	
18 March	SOS	Camille	
25 March	Songs of Surrender	U2	
1 April	Did You Know That There's a Tunnel Under Ocean Blvd	Lana Del Rey	
8 April	Antichlist	Fleddy Melculy	
15 April	#LikeMe – Seizoen 4	#LikeMe cast	
22 April	72 Seasons	Metallica	
29 April	72 Seasons	Metallica	
6 May	First Two Pages of Frankenstein	The National	
13 May	-	Ed Sheeran	
20 May	-	Ed Sheeran	
27 May	Liefde voor muziek (2023)	Various artists	
3 June	Liefde voor muziek (2023)	Various artists	
10 June	5-Star	Stray Kids	
17 June	The Show	Niall Horan	
24 June	In Times New Roman...	Queens of the Stone Age	
1 July	Per ongeluk	Pommelien Thijs	
8 July	Per ongeluk	Pommelien Thijs	
15 July	Speak Now (Taylor's Version)	Taylor Swift	
22 July	Per ongeluk	Pommelien Thijs	
29 July	Per ongeluk	Pommelien Thijs	
5 August	Als ik terugkijk (en 99 andere liedjes)	Will Tura	
12 August	Per ongeluk	Pommelien Thijs	
19 August	Per ongeluk	Pommelien Thijs	
26 August	Als ik terugkijk (en 99 andere liedjes)	Will Tura	
2 September	Magie	Camille	
9 September	Hellmut Lotti Goes Metal – Live at Graspop Metal Meeting 2023	Helmut Lotti	
16 September	Guts	Olivia Rodrigo	
23 September	Guts	Olivia Rodrigo	
30 September	Iemand van vroeger	Suzan & Freek	
7 October	Joris	Metejoor	
14 October	Droomvoeding	Brihang	
21 October	Joris	Metejoor	
28 October	Hackney Diamonds	The Rolling Stones	
4 November	1989 (Taylor's Version)	Taylor Swift	
11 November	Joris	Metejoor	
18 November	Magie	Camille	
25 November	De 3 biggetjes	K3	
2 December	Magie	Camille	
9 December	Magie	Camille	
16 December	Magie	Camille	
23 December	Magie	Camille	
30 December	Joris	Metejoor	

== Wallonia ==
List of number-one albums of 2023 in Wallonia
Issue date	Album	Artist	Reference
7 January	Mauvais ordre	Lomepal	
14 January	Mauvais ordre	Lomepal	
21 January	Central Tour 2022	Indochine	
28 January	Rush!	Måneskin	
4 February	Regarde-moi	Pierre de Maere	
11 February	Rush!	Måneskin	
18 February	Regarde-moi	Pierre de Maere	
25 February	Sincèrement	Hamza	
4 March	Sincèrement	Hamza	
11 March	2023: Enfoirés un jour, toujours	Les Enfoirés	
18 March	2023: Enfoirés un jour, toujours	Les Enfoirés	
25 March	Songs of Surrender	U2	
1 April	Memento Mori	Depeche Mode	
8 April	Memento Mori	Depeche Mode	
15 April	Memento Mori	Depeche Mode	
22 April	72 Seasons	Metallica	
29 April	D-Day	Agust D	
6 May	Sincèrement	Hamza	
13 May	-	Ed Sheeran	
20 May	Tirer la nuit sur les étoiles	Étienne Daho	
27 May	Mustafar	Luv Resval	
3 June	Addictocrate	Loïc Nottet	
10 June	5-Star	Stray Kids	
17 June	C'est quand qu'il s'éteint?	Jul	
24 June	In Times New Roman...	Queens of the Stone Age	
1 July	Saison 00	Luidji	
8 July	NI	Ninho	
15 July	NI	Ninho	
22 July	NI	Ninho	
29 July	The Ballad of Darren	Blur	
5 August	Utopia	Travis Scott	
12 August	Utopia	Travis Scott	
19 August	Utopia	Travis Scott	
26 August	NI	Ninho	
2 September	NI	Ninho	
9 September	2bis	Florent Pagny	
16 September	A.M.O.U.R	Calogero	
23 September	ADC	Freeze Corleone	
30 September	Tension	Kylie Minogue	
7 October	ADC	Freeze Corleone	
14 October	The Dark Side of the Moon Redux	Roger Waters	
21 October	Il viaggio	Mélanie De Biasio	
28 October	Hackney Diamonds	The Rolling Stones	
4 November	1989 (Taylor's Version)	Taylor Swift	
11 November	Golden	Jungkook	
18 November	À 2 à 3	Vianney	
25 November	Made in Rock 'n' Roll	Johnny Hallyday	
2 December	2bis	Florent Pagny	
9 December	La melo est gangx	Gazo and Tiakola	
16 December	La melo est gangx	Gazo and Tiakola	
23 December	À 2 à 3	Vianney	
30 December	À 2 à 3	Vianney	

== See also ==
- List of Ultratop 50 number-one singles of 2023
