= Mogwai (Chinese culture) =

Cantonese word

The word mogwai is the transliteration of the Cantonese word 魔鬼 (Jyutping: mo1 gwai2; Standard Mandarin: 魔鬼; pinyin: móguǐ) meaning 'monster', 'evil spirit', 'devil' or 'demon'. The term mo derives from the Sanskrit māra (मार), meaning 'evil beings' (literally 'death'). Examples include the yecha 夜叉 (yaksha) and the luocha 罗刹 (raksasha), both derived ultimately from Indian lore through the influence of Buddhism.

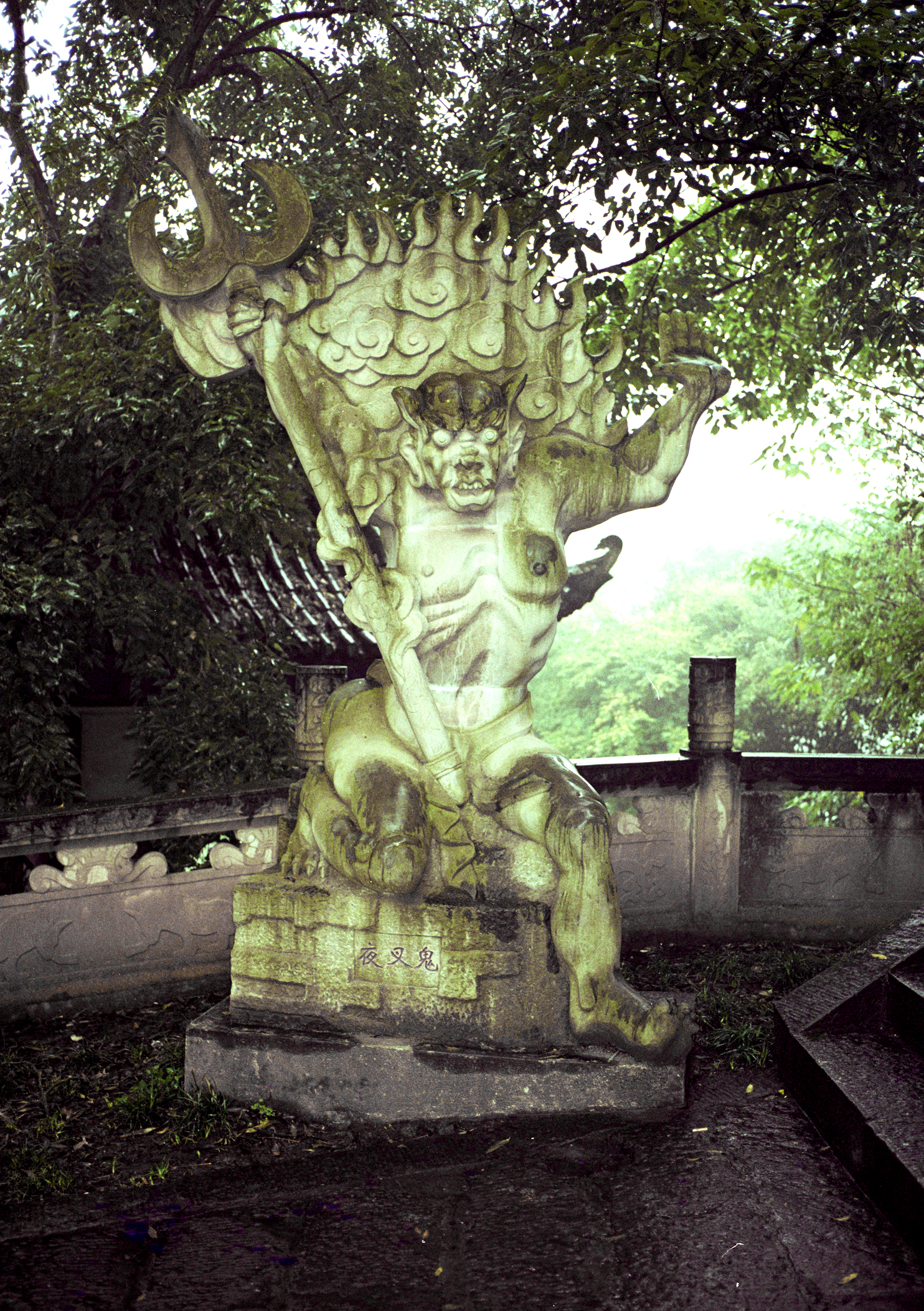
Chinese carving of a yaksha (夜叉), a kind of nature demon

== Definition and disambiguation ==
Mogui 魔鬼 refers to demons in the religious sense (魔鬼: 宗教中指引诱人犯罪的恶鬼). It is therefore used to refer to demons in the sense of both Buddhist and Christian scripture, and to truly evil spiritual entities.

While 魔 (mo), 妖 (yao), 鬼 (gui), 怪 (guai) are used loosely and interchangeably to refer to malevolent supernatural beings in literature, it is also clear that the characters have different specific connotations, as follows:

- Mogui 魔鬼 (demons) can be distinguished from yaoguai 妖怪 (goblins, sprites), which refer to folkloric supernatural beings associated with abnormal phenomena (妖怪: 怪异 - 反常的事物与现象), and who are more akin in their nature and quality to the unseelie fae of European folklore.
- Mogui 魔鬼 (demons) can be distinguished from gui 鬼 (ghosts), which in the usual sense refers primarily to souls of departed beings (鬼: 人死后的灵魂).
- Guai 怪 refers to any strange phenomenon (怪 : 奇异，不平常) and can encompass both mo (魔) and yao (妖), in addition to other aberrant beings, including mutants.

== In Chinese folklore ==
=== Types ===
Examples of Chinese demons include the yaksha (夜叉) and the raksasha (罗刹), amongst others. Both the yaksha and raksasha are derived from Indian folklore, and in the Chinese version, are violent and ferocious beings with sadistic tendencies.

=== Luocha (罗刹, raksasha) ===
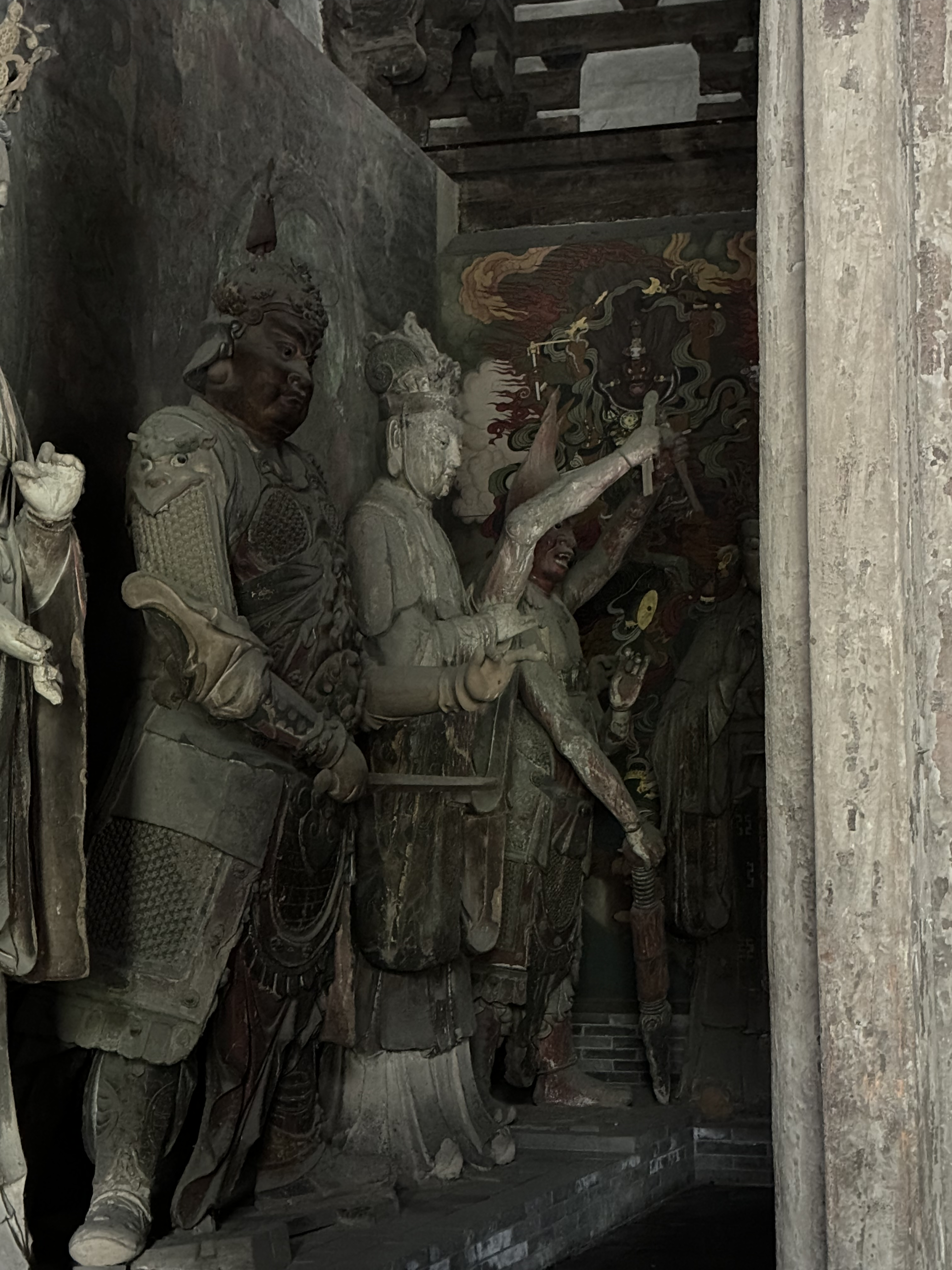
Raksasha guardians in a temple

Bloodthirsty malevolent demons with ugly appearances derived from Indian legend and entering China through the influence of Buddhism. They are described as evil man-eaters of large appearance and stature, and capable of swift and terrifying flight.

In some texts, they are described as jailers in hell tasked with punishing criminals, or as guardians of scripture upon conversion to Buddhism.

They feature in Pu Song Ling's tale "The Raksha Country and the Sea Market" as hideous beings that possess standards of beauty antithetical to that of the Chinese world, and whose society the protagonist has to cope with.

=== Yecha (夜叉, yaksha) ===
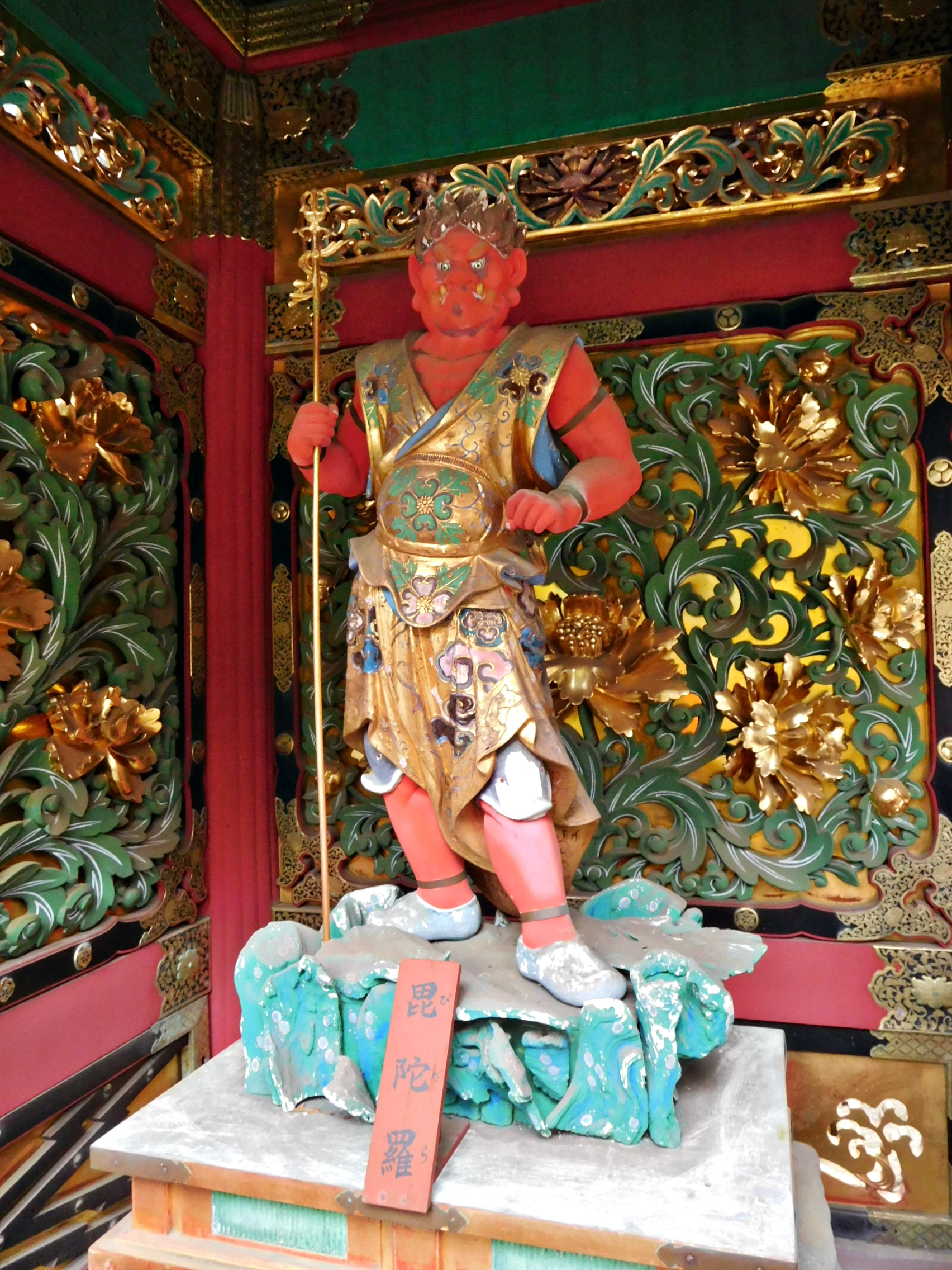
Red-skinned yaksha statue

The Chinese transliteration of the Sanskrit word yaksha. Demons from Indian folklore that entered into Chinese mythology through the influence of Buddhism. They appear in the Chinese gods and demons fiction and records of the strange genres of literature. These include the 16th-century classic "Investiture of the Gods" and "Strange Tales from a Chinese Studio". Today yecha (夜叉 is commonly employed as a metaphor to describe anyone who is both ferocious and unpleasant.

There are two categories of yaksha 夜叉 – those that fly through the air, and those that travel through the earth.

==== Air-traversing yaksha (空行夜叉) ====
Air-traversing yaksha (空行夜叉) are described as flying through the night with a pair of wings and radiating a strange glowing darkness. They are variously said to have red, blue or yellow complexions and animal heads. They take pleasure in afflicting human beings.

==== Earth-traversing yaksha (地行夜叉) ====
Earth-traversing yaksha (地行夜叉) are described as having flaming eyebrows, being several meters in height, and having a strange half-moon formation in between their eyes.

=== Rain demons ===
According to Chinese tradition, mogwai are certain demons which often inflict harm on humans. They are said to reproduce sexually during mating seasons triggered by the coming of rain. Supposedly, they take care to breed at these times because rain signifies rich and full times ahead.

== Mara (मार) origin ==
The term mo derives from the Sanskrit māra (मार), meaning 'evil beings' (literally 'death'). In Hinduism and Buddhism, Mara determines fates of death and desire that tether people to an unending cycle of reincarnation and suffering. He leads people to sin, misdeeds, and self-destruction. Meanwhile, gwai does not necessarily mean 'evil' or demonic spirits. Classically, it simply means deceased spirits or souls of the dead. Nevertheless, in modern Mandarin, it has evolved to refer usually to the dead spirits or ghosts of non-family members that may take vengeance on living humans who caused them pain when they were still living. It is common for the living to redress their sins by sacrificing money to gwai by burning (usually fake) paper banknotes so that gwai can have funds to use in the afterlife.

== See also ==
- Chinese mythology in popular culture
- Ghosts in Chinese culture
- Gremlins, 1984 American comedy horror film
- List of supernatural beings in Chinese folklore
- Space Monster, Wangmagwi, 1967 South Korean kaijū film
- Vengeful ghost
