= Eugene Yi =

American documentary filmmaker

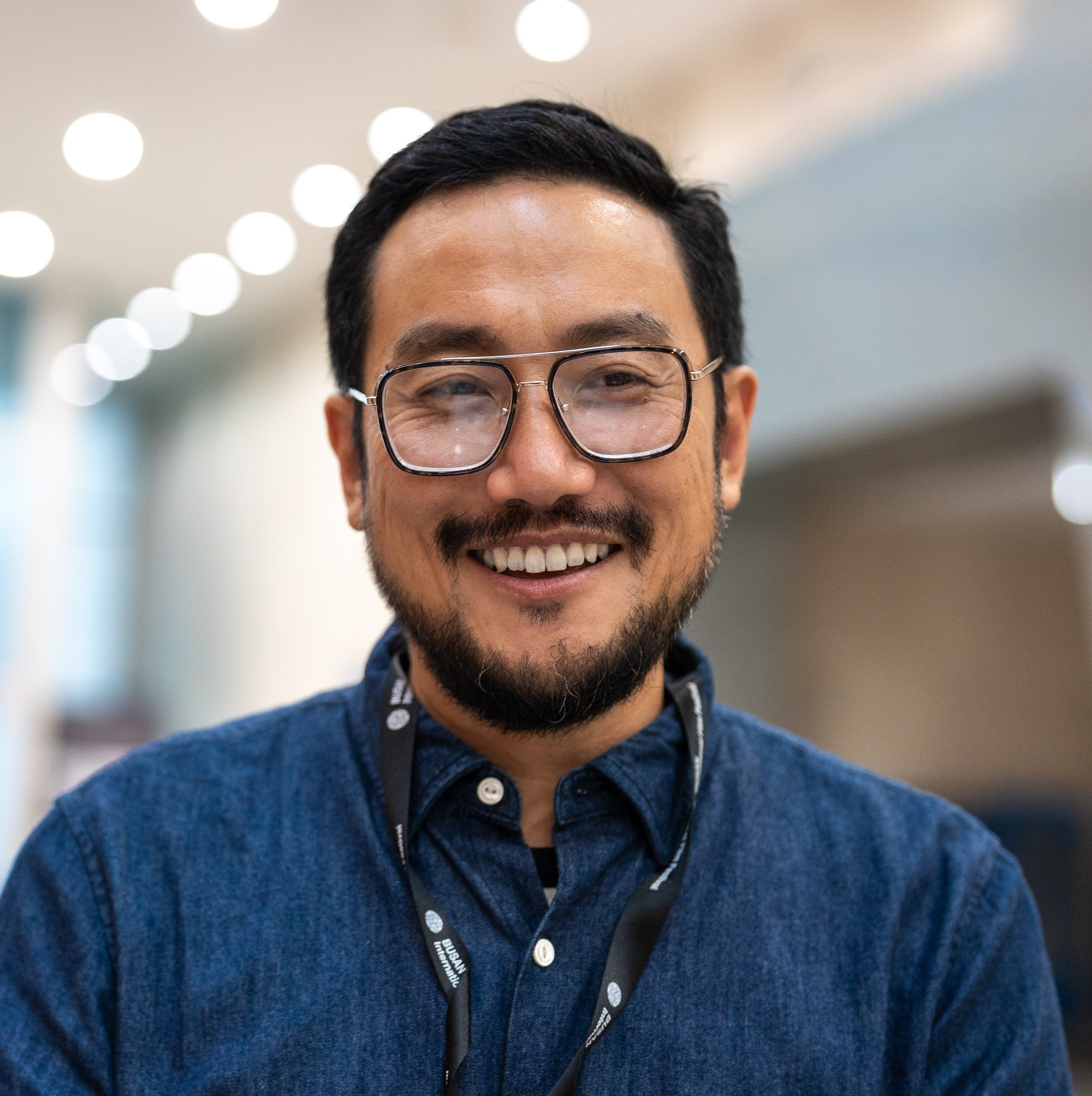
- Eugene Yi in 2025 in Busan
- Occupation: Documentary filmmaker
- Notable work: The Rose: Come Back to Me

Eugene Yi is an American documentary filmmaker known for The Rose: Come Back to Me. Yi has said he is drawn to stories about diasporic communities.

== Career ==
Yi worked in film editing and print journalism before becoming a director. He edited videos for outlets including The New York Times and Al Jazeera.

Yi co-directed, with Julie Ha, the 2022 documentary, Free Chol Soo Lee, about the wrongful conviction of Chol Soo Lee for the murder of gang leader Yip Yee Tak in San Francisco. The documentary explores the life of Lee, who spent nearly a decade in prisons in California before being released. At the 2022 Sundance Film Festival, where the movie premiered, it was broadcast on PBS. The documentary won an Emmy in the Outstanding Historical Documentary category at the 2024 Emmy Awards.

In 2023, Yi directed The Rose: Come Back to Me, which premiered at the 2025 Tribeca Film Festival in June. On the documentary, Yi has stated, "On some level it’s a very familiar story for a lot of European or American or Latin American bands, but just one that you hear less of in Korea. In that way, being able to hear a lesser heard story, that was something that really, really resonated with me, as well as in terms of giving a much rounder vision and look into what it is to be a Korean musician and a Korean artist right now." He has also stated "it was so much rarer to hear about Korean musicians deciding to do things their own way."

== Personal life ==
Yi is a second-generation Korean American. Growing up, Yi enjoyed American rock and roll, and was exposed to k-pop and Korean culture.
