= CONQuest Festival =

Popular culture convention in the Philippines

- Status: Dissolved
- Genre: Convention
- Country: Philippines
- Years active: 2017–2019, 2022–2023
- Inaugurated: December 16, 2017; 8 years ago
- Organiser: AcadArena
- Website: www.conquestph.com

The CONQuest Festival was an annual pop culture and gaming convention in the Philippines organized by AcadArena.

== History ==
=== Early years (2017–2019) ===
CONQuest Festival was originally established as a high school project in Iloilo City. The inaugural edition was held on December 16, 2017 at the Casa Real de Iloilo, which was attended by 700 people.

The ISC Events-organized convention received support from the Iloilo City government for its second edition, held from July 28 to 29 in the same venue.

The 2019 edition was hosted at the Iloilo Convention Center with over 6,000 attendees. The convention had a two-year hiatus in 2020 and 2021 due to the COVID-19 pandemic.

=== 2022 edition ===
CONQuest by AcadArena returned in 2022. This edition was the first to be held in Metro Manila, as the scope of the event grew. The event would feature Filipino Mobile Legends: Bang Bang esports players as well as other personalities known for Genshin Impact and Valorant. The event reportedly had 30,000 attendees.

=== 2023 edition ===
CONQuest Festival 2023 was held from June 2 to 4, 2023, at the SM Mall of Asia Complex in Pasay. From the second day, the event with a target attendance figure of at least 60,000 would be marred by overcrowding and ticketing issues. Refunds were pledged to be made.

In response, AcadArena's co-owners Kevin Hoang and Ariane Lim announced that the festival was to be dissolved, making the 2023 edition its last.
