= RunSeokjin Ep. Tour =

2025 concert tour by Jin

- Tour by Jin
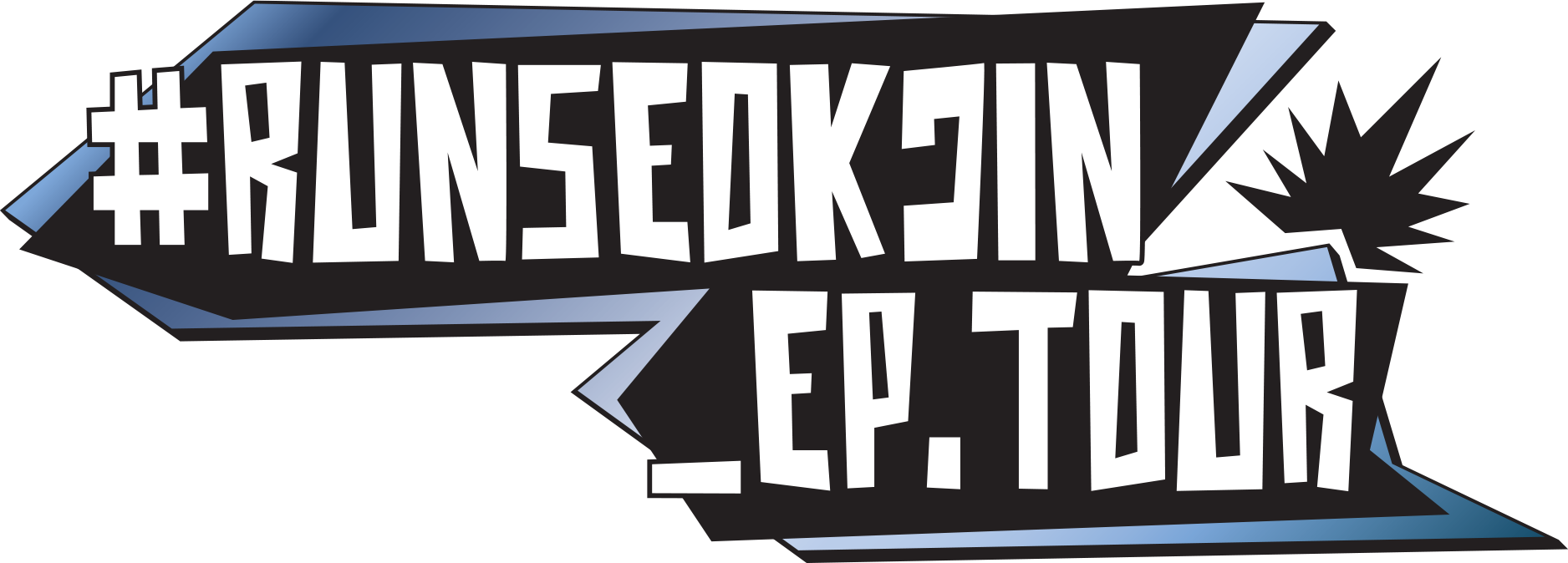
- Location: North America; Asia; Europe
- Associated albums: Happy; Echo
- Start date: June 28, 2025
- End date: November 1, 2025
- No. of shows: 20
- Attendance: 287,000
- Box office: $46,100,000

RunSeokjin Ep. Tour (stylized as #RUNSEOKJIN_EP.TOUR) was the first concert tour by South Korean singer Jin, in support of his first and second extended plays, Happy (2024) and Echo (2025). The tour began on June 28, 2025, in Goyang, and concluded on November 1, 2025, in Incheon.

== Background and development ==
After completing his military service in June 2024, Jin released his first studio album Happy in November 2024. His second album, Echo, was released in May 2025.

Following the announcement of Echo's release on April 14, 2025, Bighit on April 17, 2025 announced his first solo tour, RunSeokjin Ep.Tour, making him the third member of BTS to hold a solo tour. The tour has nine stops, with two shows at each stop.

On October 2, 2025, BigHit announced the RunSeokjin Ep.Tour Encore in Incheon.

== Set list ==
This set list represents the show on June 29, 2025, in Goyang, South Korea. It does not represent all dates.

1. "Running Wild"
2. "I'll Be There"
3. "구름과 떠나는 여행" (With the Clouds)
4. "네게 닿을 때까지" (Falling)
5. "Don't Say You Love Me"
6. "슈퍼 참치" (Super Tuna) (extended version)
7. "그리움에" (I Will Come To You) (piano)
8. "Abyss" (piano)
9. "Background"
10. "Another Level"
11. "Heart on the Window"
12. "Loser"
13. "Rope It"
14. "Dynamite" / "Butter" / "Mikrokosmos" / "봄날" (Spring Day)
15. "The Astronaut"
16. "Nothing Without Your Love"

Encore

17. "Epiphany"
18. "Moon"
19. "오늘의 나에게" (To Me, Today)

== Tour dates ==
Key
‡	Indicates performances streamed simultaneously on Weverse Concerts

Concert dates
Date	City	Country	Venue	Attendance	Revenue
June 28, 2025 ‡	Goyang	South Korea	Goyang Auxiliary Stadium / Jamsil Indoor Stadium (Note: Live viewing venue.)	19,300	$2,100,000
June 29, 2025 ‡	Goyang	South Korea	Goyang Auxiliary Stadium / Jamsil Indoor Stadium	19,300	$2,100,000
July 5, 2025	Chiba	Japan	Makuhari Messe International Exhibition Hall 4-6	217,000	$32,500,000
July 6, 2025	Chiba	Japan	Makuhari Messe International Exhibition Hall 4-6	217,000	$32,500,000
July 12, 2025	Osaka	Japan	Kyocera Dome Osaka	217,000	$32,500,000
July 13, 2025 ‡	Osaka	Japan	Kyocera Dome Osaka	217,000	$32,500,000
July 17, 2025	Anaheim	United States	Honda Center	217,000	$32,500,000
July 18, 2025	Anaheim	United States	Honda Center	217,000	$32,500,000
July 22, 2025	Dallas	United States	American Airlines Center	217,000	$32,500,000
July 23, 2025	Dallas	United States	American Airlines Center	217,000	$32,500,000
July 26, 2025	Tampa	United States	Amalie Arena	217,000	$32,500,000
July 27, 2025	Tampa	United States	Amalie Arena	217,000	$32,500,000
July 30, 2025	Newark	United States	Prudential Center	217,000	$32,500,000
July 31, 2025	Newark	United States	Prudential Center	217,000	$32,500,000
August 5, 2025	London	United Kingdom	The O2 Arena	50,700	$11,500,000
August 6, 2025	London	United Kingdom	The O2 Arena	50,700	$11,500,000
August 9, 2025	Amsterdam	Netherlands	Ziggo Dome	50,700	$11,500,000
August 10, 2025	Amsterdam	Netherlands	Ziggo Dome	50,700	$11,500,000
October 31, 2025	Incheon	South Korea	Incheon Munhak Main Stadium	—	—
November 1, 2025	Incheon	South Korea	Incheon Munhak Main Stadium	—	—
Total				287,000	$46,100,000
