= Lumpens =

South Korean video production company

Lumpens (Korean: 룸펜스) is a South Korean-based video production company formed and led by art director Yong-seok Choi. The team includes directors and producers specializing in music videos, television advertisements, experimental films, graphic design, and visual art.

== Background ==
Starting as a visual art production company by Yeon-seok Choi, 'Lumpens' was a nickname given to Choi by a college professor referring to the German insult. The company initially focused on commercials and fashion shoots. In 2010, their V.A.J.P (Visual Art Jam Performance) garnered some attention, but Choi says the first real recognition came after he showcased a 3D version of animation Robot Taekwon V at a fan convention in January 2011. As part of 'thecreatorsproject', they began making popular music videos with Yoon Mi-rae, working with her on the music video for "Get It In" in 2011.

Since then, they have worked with various South Korean artists, including BTS, MFBTY, Cho Yong-pil, Rain, Lee Hyori, Sistar, Wonder Girls, Younha, Hyuna, Spica, ENHYPEN and IU among others. When discussing the filming of Sunmi's Lalalay music video, she remarked, "this time it was directed by Lumpens, who seems to know me best. Because of this, he [Choi] was able to catch every move and there were minimal difficulties during filming." In 2014, the company began working with Big Hit Entertainment, starting a prolific partnership with BTS. They have also worked closely with a small number of independent artists, such as ee and Guckkasten.

== Awards and nominations ==
Their work has received multiple honors, including the nomination for 2013 Mnet Asian Music Awards Music Video of the Year for Cho Yong-pil's "Hello", 2017 Melon Music Awards Music Video of the Year for BTS' "DNA", 2018 Melon Music Awards Best Music Video Award for Ko Yoo-jeong's direction on GFriend's "Time for the Moon Night", 2018 Mnet Asian Music Awards Fan Choice Best Music Video for BTS' "Idol", 2020 Mnet Asian Music Awards Best Video Director of the Year for BTS' "Butter", and 2021 nomination for MTV Video Music Award for Best Editing Yong Seok Choi's work on BTS' "Butter"

== Videography ==
=== Music videos ===
Music Video	Year	Performer	Credited Director(s)	Length	Ref.
"Tonight"	2013	Spica	Lumpens	3:42	
"Boy In Luv" (상남자)	2014	BTS	Choi Yongseok & Edie Ko (Lumpens)	4:42	
"Just One Day" (하루만)	2014	BTS	Lumpens	4:09	
"Danger"	2014	BTS	Choi Yongseok (Lumpens)	4:52	
"Danger (Japanese Ver.)"	2014	BTS	Edie Ko (Lumpens)	4:12	
"I Need U"	2015	BTS	Lumpens	3:40	
"Run"	2015	BTS	Choi Yongseok & Edie Ko (Lumpens)	7:31	
"Fire (불타오르네)"	2016	BTS	Lumpens	4:55	
"Blood Sweat & Tears" (피 땀 눈물)	2016	BTS	Lumpens	6:04	
"Spring Day" (봄날)	2017	BTS	Lumpens	5:29	
"Blood Sweat & Tears" (Japanese Ver.) (血、汗、涙)	2017	BTS	Choi Yongseok (Lumpens)	4:12	
"DNA"	2017	BTS	Choi Yongseok (Lumpens)	4:16	
"Fake Love"	2018	BTS	Choi Yongseok (Lumpens)	5:19	
"Idol"	2018	BTS	Choi Yongseok (Lumpens)	3:52	
"Idol" (feat. Nicki Minaj)	2018	BTS	Choi Yongseok (Lumpens)	4:55	
"Airplane Pt. 2 (Japanese Ver.)"	2018	BTS	Choi Yongseok (Lumpens)	3:47	
"작은 것들을 위한 시 (Boy with Luv)" (feat. Halsey)	2019	BTS	Choi Yongseok (Lumpens)	4:12	
"Chicken Noodle Soup" (feat. Becky G)	2019	J-Hope	Choi Yongseok (Lumpens)	4:29	
"Make It Right (feat. Lauv)"	2019	BTS	Guzza (Lumpens)	4:17	
"Make It Right (Vertical ver.)"	2019	BTS	Guzza (Lumpens)	4:00	
"9 and Three Quarters (Run Away)" (9와 4분의 3 승강장에서 너를 기다려)	2019	TXT	Choi Yongseok (Lumpens)	5:16	
"Apple"	2020	GFriend	Lumpens	4:05	
" 'ON' Kinetic Manifesto Film : Come Prima"	2020	BTS	Choi Yongseok (Lumpens)	4:58	
"ON"	2020	BTS	Choi Yongseok (Lumpens)	5:54	
"Puma" (동물원을 빠져나온 퓨마)	2020	TXT	Guzza (Lumpens)	3:36	
"Daechwita" (대취타)	2020	Agust D	Choi Yongseok & Yoon Jihye (Lumpens)	4:28	
"Black Swan"	2020	BTS	Choi Yongseok (Lumpens)	3:37	
"Dynamite"	2020	BTS	Choi Yongseok & Yoon Jihye (Lumpens)	3:44	
"MAGO"	2020	GFriend	Guzza (Lumpens)	3:30	
"Blue Hour" (5시 53분의 하늘에서 발견한 너와 나)	2020	TXT	Guzza (Lumpens)	5:03	
"Life Goes On"	2020	BTS	Jeon Jungkook, Choi Yongseok (Lumpens) & Yoon Jihye (Lumpens)	3:50	
"Given-Taken"	2020	Enhypen	Choi Yongseok (Lumpens) & Yoon Jihye (Lumpens)	3:52	
"Film Out"	2021	BTS	Choi Yongseok (Lumpens)	3:48	
"Drunk-Dazed"	2021	Enhypen	Choi Yongseok (Lumpens), Yoon Jihye (Lumpens) & Ro Ran (Lumpens)	4:42	
"0X1=LOVESONG (I Know I Love You)" (feat. Seori)	2021	TXT	Choi Yongseok, Guzza (Lumpens)	4:35	
"Butter"	2021	BTS	Choi Yongseok (Lumpens)	3:02	
"Permission to Dance"	2021	BTS	Choi Yongseok (Lumpens) & Woogie Kim (MOTHER)	5:00	
"LO$ER=LO♡ER"	2021	TXT	Guzza (Lumpens)	3:56	
"Tamed-Dashed"	2021	Enhypen	Choi Yongseok (Lumpens), Yoon Jihye (Lumpens) & Ro Ran (Lumpens)	4:10	
"Blessed-Cursed"	2022	Enhypen	Choi Yongseok (Lumpens), Yoon Jihye (Lumpens) & Ro Ran (Lumpens)	3:08	
"That That"	2022	PSY	Choi Yongseok (Lumpens)	3:37	
"The Astronaut"	2022	Jin	Choi Yongseok (Lumpens), Yoon Jihye (Lumpens) & Ro Ran (Lumpens)	5:19	
"Yet To Come (The Most Beautiful Moment)"	2022	BTS	Choi Yongseok (Lumpens), Yoon Jihye (Lumpens) & Ro Ran (Lumpens)	4:40	
"Impurities"	2022	Le Sserafim	Yoon Jihye (Lumpens) & Ro Ran (Lumpens)	3:42	
"Blade" (철학보다 무서운건 비비의 총알)	2022	Bibi	Choi Yongseok (Lumpens), Yoon Jihye (Lumpens) & Ro Ran (Lumpens)	3:18	
"Haegeum"	2023	Agust D	Choi Yongseok (Lumpens), Yoon Jihye (Lumpens) & Ro Ran (Lumpens)	4:34	
"Eve, Psyche & The Bluebeard's Wife"	2023	Le Sserafim	Yoon Jihye (Lumpens), Ro Ran (Lumpens) & Kim Chanyang	3:47	
"Smart"	2024	Le Sserafim	Choi Yongseok (Lumpens)	3:14	
"Spot!"	2024	Zico featuring Jennie	Choi Yongseok (Lumpens) & Ro Ran (Lumpens)	3:12	
"R.E.M"	2024	Kiss Of Life	Choi Yongseok (Lumpens)	3:13	
"Get Loud"	2024	Kiss Of Life	Choi Yongseok (Lumpens)	3:04	
"I'll Be There"	2024	Jin	Choi Yongseok (Lumpens) & Ro Ran (Lumpens)	3:14	
"Running Wild"	2024	Jin	Choi Yongseok (Lumpens) & Ro Ran (Lumpens)	3:17	
"Don't Say You Love Me"	2025	Jin	Choi Yongseok (Lumpens) & Ro Ran (Lumpens)	3:25	
