= Love Yourself: Answer =

Compilation album by South Korean boy group BTS

Compilation album by BTS
- Released: August 24, 2018
- Recorded: 2016–2018
- Genres: Pop; hip-hop; R&B
- Length: 99:51 (physical); 104:11 (digital)
- Languages: Korean; English
- Labels: Big Hit; iriver
- Producer: Pdogg

BTS chronology
| Love Yourself: Tear (2018) | Love Yourself: Answer (2018) | Map of the Soul: Persona (2019) |

Physical album covers
- (Left to right) S, E, L, and F version covers

Singles from Love Yourself: Answer
- 1. "Idol" Released: August 24, 2018

Love Yourself: Answer (stylized as LOVE YOURSELF 結 'Answer') is the third Korean-language (Note: Love Yourself: Answer is BTS' second Korean-language compilation album to receive a release outside of Japan. The Best of Bangtan Sonyeondan -Korea Edition-, BTS' second Korean compilation album overall, was released exclusively in Japan.) compilation album by South Korean boy band BTS. The album was released on August 24, 2018, by Big Hit Entertainment and is available in four different versions: S, E, L, and F. The album contains twenty-five tracks (twenty-six for the digital version), including seven new songs, with the track "Idol" serving as the lead single. Most tracks are from Love Yourself: Her and Love Yourself: Tear, including some remixes. The album debuted at number one in South Korea, Canada, Japan, and the United States, becoming BTS' second chart-topping album in the US market.

On November 7, 2019, Love Yourself: Answer became the first Korean album to spend one year on the Billboard 200 chart. Two days later, it became the first Korean album to receive gold certification in the United States. It sold 60,000 copies in the United Kingdom, making BTS the first Asian artist to have a Silver-certified album in the country.

By June 2021, the album had spent 100 non-consecutive weeks on the Billboard 200, making it the only Korean album to do so.

== Background and release ==
Love Yourself: Answer was first announced on July 16, 2018, with the announcement of the album containing seven new tracks coming the following day. The album was designed as the finale of the Love Yourself series, which connected the story plot of short film Love Yourself 起 Wonder, EP Love Yourself 承 'Her', and studio album Love Yourself 轉 'Tear', forming the "起承轉結 (기승전결) (Kishōtenketsu)" storytelling composition.

Two versions of BTS' Jin in the "Epiphany" comeback trailer, representing a personal journey.

On August 6, Big Hit Entertainment released a Most Beautiful Moment in Life note, part of a series of fictional notes pertaining to the concept of BTS' albums, starting with their 2015 EP The Most Beautiful Moment in Life, Part 1. The note, written by BTS member Jin, spoke about him finding a notebook written by his father in the story. The book discussed the father's failures. Three days later, on August 9, the trailer for the album, featuring a new song entitled "Epiphany", was released. The solo, described by Billboard's Tamar Herman as a "building pop-rock melody", was performed by Jin, and speaks about finding self-love. The song serves as one of the tracks for the album. The trailer was directed by Yong-seok Choi (Lumpens), and portrays multiple versions of Jin in a room, telling the story of a personal journey. Philip Merrill of the Recording Academy described the video as having a "sense of going backward and forward, through time and through different versions of one's self". Discussing Jin's performance of the video, Hong Hye-min of The Korea Times stated that it was well-acted and emotional, with Jin's "sorrowful, free voice stand[ing] out".

Promotional concept photos presenting four different themes were released on August 13 for the "S" and "E" versions, and August 16 for the "L" and "F" versions. Version "S" contained elements inspired by New Romanticism, with BTS in bright red boxes surrounded by cameras, eyes, hands, and amplifiers. Concept version "E" contained bright pastels, with BTS members in bubbles filled with fantastical nature elements. The second set of teasers, versions "L" and "F", were brighter, with BTS members wearing a mix of retro streetwear and formal blazers and suits. In addition, version "L" contained black-and-white images, collaged with the contrasting bright photographs. The official tracklist was released on August 20, revealing that it would be a compilation album containing songs from Love Yourself: Her and Love Yourself: Tear, with a total of twenty-five tracks. The tracklist also announced remixed versions of BTS' previous singles "DNA", "Mic Drop" and "Fake Love". On August 22, 2018, the teaser for "Idol" was released. On August 24, two hours before the release of Love Yourself: Answer, Big Hit Entertainment announced that an alternative version of "Idol" featuring Nicki Minaj will be included in the digital version of the album. Afterwards, the album was released, along with the music video for "Idol". A music video for the Nicki Minaj version of "Idol" was later released on September 6, 2018.

== Composition ==
Some of the album's themes include empowerment, youth, love, and reflection while the moods exhibited through the album are cathartic, lively, confident, passionate, and yearning among many other things. The genre of the album showcases various types of pop.

In an interview with Billboard, some of the producers that helped with the album recalled their thought processes and aims for the album. Writer Melanie Fontana, who worked on "Euphoria", wanted the chorus to explode with something more "chanty" but the crowd could sing along easily too. Ray Michael Djan Jr. stated that the song "I'm Fine" was a response to an earlier song he helped write called "Save Me". A lot of drum and bass influenced "I'm Fine" and they blended a lot of different sounds to create it. On the title song "Idol", Ali Tamposi stated the rep from Big Hit wanted the song to feel intense.

Thematically, Love Yourself: Answer placed the songs of the Love Yourself series within the narrative of beginning, development, turn and conclusion to illustrate the excitement of love, the pains of farewell, and the enlightenment of self-love.

== Promotion ==
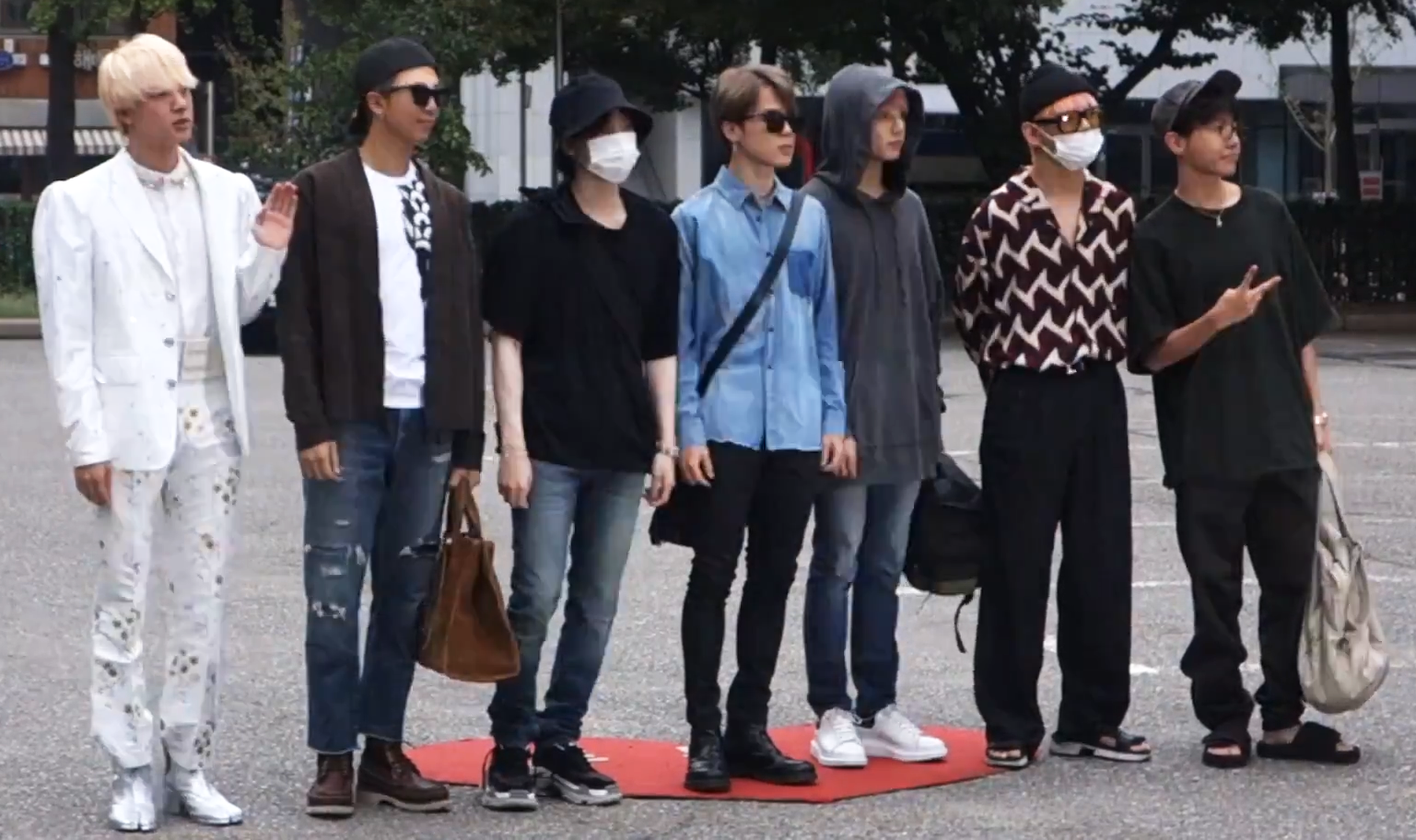
BTS arriving at KBS' Music Bank to perform on August 31, 2018.

On August 26, 2018, BTS held a press conference discussing the album, as well as the BTS World Tour: Love Yourself, which began the previous day. They performed "Idol" and "I'm Fine" on various South Korean music shows for the week of August 26 with prerecorded performances airing the following week, including M Countdown, Music Bank, Show! Music Core, and Inkigayo. A shortened version of "Save Me" from The Most Beautiful Moment in Life: Young Forever served as an intro track during the "I'm Fine" performance on M Countdown. BTS performed "Idol" at the second Soribada Best K-Music Awards on August 30, with "Fake Love" sung as an encore performance.

While in the United States for the North American leg of their Love Yourself tour, BTS performed "Idol" on the second semifinal episode of America's Got Talent season thirteen, which aired on September 12. The band sang "Idol" on The Tonight Show Starring Jimmy Fallon and Good Morning America on September 25 and 26 respectively, in addition to a sit-down interview on both shows. A bonus performance of "I'm Fine" was also released on The Tonight Show's YouTube channel.

On October 1, 2018, news surfaced that BTS were scheduled to appear on the BBC's The Graham Norton Show on October 12, which was later confirmed by Big Hit Entertainment five days later.

== Critical reception ==
Professional ratings
Review scores
| Source | Rating |
|---|---|
| AllMusic | 4.5/5 stars |
| Clash Music | 9/10 |
| SCMP | 4/5 stars |

Love Yourself: Answer received positive reviews from critics. Nemo Kim from the South China Morning Post gave the album four stars out of five and said, "[BTS] rappers show their chops on solo tracks, band send a message to Korean youth about self-love, and single Idol sees them don traditional garb and blend pop with ancient percussion as Minaj joins in," praising the album as "cement[ing] BTS' place as kings of the genre". In a positive review, Taylor Glasby of Clash magazine described the narrative of the album as a "portray[al] of the fears, mistakes and thoughts we inflict on ourselves" which remain "poignantly relatable". In addition, she said that the narrative serves "to remind us that each person must make their own path, and there's no one size fits all answer to achieving self-acceptance". However, for "Answer: Love Myself", the track concluding the narrative on the album, Glasby felt that it "lyrically exceeds although plays the instrumental a little too safe". Tamar Herman of Billboard praised the album, calling it a "masterful culmination of years of work and rife with meaning, Answer is undeniably a magnum opus from BTS that that few other artists, boy bands or otherwise, ever can hope to achieve."

== Accolades ==
Awards and nominations
| Organization | Year | Award | Result | Ref. |
|---|---|---|---|---|
| MBC Plus X Genie Music Awards | 2018 | Digital Album of the Year | Won | |
| Korea Popular Music Awards | 2018 | Best Album | Won | |
| Golden Disc Awards | 2019 | Album Bonsang | Won | |
| Golden Disc Awards | 2019 | Album Daesang | Won | |
| Gaon Chart Music Awards | 2019 | Album of the Year – 3rd Quarter | Won | |
| Korean Music Awards | 2019 | Album of the Year | Nominated | |
| Korean Music Awards | 2019 | Best Pop Album | Nominated | |
| Japan Gold Disc Awards | 2019 | Best 3 Albums (Asia) | Won | |
| Gaffa-Prisen Awards | 2019 | Best International Album | Won | |
| The Fact Music Awards | 2019 | Best Album | Won | |
| Soompi Awards | 2019 | Album of the Year | Won | |

Love Yourself: Answer on select critic lists
| Publication | List | Rank | Ref. |
|---|---|---|---|
| AllMusic | AllMusic's Favorite Pop Albums of 2018 | Included | |
| AllMusic | The decade's 200 best albums (listed under 2018) | Included | |
| Billboard | The 20 Best K-pop Albums of 2018 | 1 | |
| Bravo | These are the ten best K-pop albums of the year | 1 | |
| DIY | DIY'S Albums of the Year 2018 | 2 | |
| EBS | Top 100 Korean Albums (2004–2023) | Included | |
| Rolling Stone India | 10 Best K-pop Albums of 2018 | 1 | |
| Spin | The 101 Best Albums of the 2010s | 83 | |
| Uproxx | 20 Must-Hear Pop Albums From 2018 | 16 | |
| Yahoo! | The best albums of 2018 | 8 | |
| Yardbarker | The 10 best pop albums of 2018 | Included | |

== Commercial performance ==
During the period of July 18 to 24, the first six days of the pre-order period for Love Yourself: Answer, iriver Inc reported that the album had sold more than 1.51 million copies, surpassing its predecessor Love Yourself: Tear as the most pre-ordered album in South Korea. It subsequently debuted at number one on the Gaon Album Chart, selling 1,933,450 copies during the last eight days of the month of August. The album broke the record for the most monthly sales in the history of the Gaon Chart since its inception in 2010. The record was also previously held by BTS' own Love Yourself: Tear. In October 2018, Love Yourself: Answer earned Double Million certification from the Korea Music Content Association, for selling over 2 million copies. This made BTS the first music act first to do so since the Gaon Chart began music certifications earlier that year. The album received Triple Million certification from the KMCA in November 2021.

Love Yourself: Answer debuted at number one on the US Billboard 200, becoming BTS' second number-one album—their second of 2018—and their highest sales week in the country to date. It earned 185,000 album-equivalent units, including 141,000 in pure album sales. It also became the first Korean album to ever receive an RIAA album certification.

Love Yourself: Answer became BTS' third top-20 album in the United Kingdom, hitting number fourteen on the Official Albums chart. The album later achieved a Silver Certification in the UK, becoming their first album to so. "Idol" became BTS' first-ever song, as well as the first-ever Korean-language song, to reach the top 40 of the Official Singles chart, ranking at number 21. In Ireland, the song reached number 33.

Tower Records Japan reported the album was the third most imported album in Japan for 2018, only behind Twice's album What Is Love and BTS' Love Yourself: Tear. The track "Answer: Love Myself" was certified silver by the Recording Industry Association of Japan in July 2021 for surpassing 30 million streams in the country.

== Track listing ==
CD 1
| No. | Title | Writer(s) | Producer(s) | Length |
|---|---|---|---|---|
| 1. | "Euphoria" (solo by Jungkook) | Jordan "DJ Swivel" Young; Candace Nicole Sosa; Melanie Joy Fontana; "hitman" bang; Supreme Boi; Adora; RM | Jordan "DJ Swivel" Young | 3:49 |
| 2. | "Trivia 起: Just Dance" (solo by J-Hope) | Hiss noise; J-Hope | Hiss noise | 3:45 |
| 3. | "Serendipity" (full length edition) (solo by Jimin) | "hitman" bang; Ray Michael Djan Jr.; Slow Rabbit; RM; Ashton Foster | Slow Rabbit | 4:37 |
| 4. | "DNA" | "hitman" bang; Pdogg; RM; KASS; Suga; Supreme Boi | Pdogg | 3:43 |
| 5. | "보조개" (Bojogae / Dimple) (performed by Jin, Jimin, V, and Jungkook) | Allison Kaplan; RM; Matthew Tishler | Matthew Tishler; Crash Cove | 3:16 |
| 6. | "Trivia 承: Love" (solo by RM) | Slow Rabbit; RM; Hiss noise | Slow Rabbit | 3:46 |
| 7. | "Her" (performed by RM, Suga, and J-Hope) | Suga; RM; Slow Rabbit; J-Hope | Suga; Slow Rabbit | 3:49 |
| 8. | "Singularity" (solo by V) | RM; Charlie J. Perry | Charlie J. Perry | 3:17 |
| 9. | "Fake Love" | "hitman" bang; Pdogg; RM | Pdogg | 4:02 |
| 10. | "전하지 못한 진심" (featuring Steve Aoki) (Jeonhaji mot-han jinsim / The Truth Untold) (performed by Jin, Jimin, V, and Jungkook) | Steve Aoki; Noah Conrad; RM; Jake Torrey; Annika Wells; Roland Spreckley; Slow Rabbit | Steve Aoki | 4:02 |
| 11. | "Trivia 轉: Seesaw" (solo by Suga) | Slow Rabbit; SUGA | Slow Rabbit; SUGA | 4:06 |
| 12. | "Tear" (performed by RM, Suga, and J-Hope) | Shin Myung-soo; DOCSKIM; Suga; RM; J-Hope | DOCSKIM | 4:45 |
| 13. | "Epiphany" (solo by Jin) | "hitman" bang; Slow Rabbit; Adora | Slow Rabbit | 4:00 |
| 14. | "I'm Fine" | Ray Michael Djan; Lauren Dyson; Ashton Foster; Samantha Harper; Suga; RM; J-Hope; Jung Bobby; Yoon Guitar; Jordan "DJ Swivel" Young; Candace Nicole Sosa; Pdogg | Pdogg | 4:00 |
| 15. | "Idol" | "hitman" bang; Roman Campolo; Pdogg; RM; Supreme Boi; Ali Tamposi | Pdogg | 3:43 |
| 16. | "Answer: Love Myself" | Pdogg; Jung Bobby; Jordan "DJ Swivel" Young; Candace Nicole Sosa; RM; Suga; J-Hope; Ray Michael Djan; Ashton Foster; Conor Maynard | Pdogg | 4:11 |
| Total length: | | | | 62:51 |

CD 2
| No. | Title | Writer(s) | Producer(s) | Length |
|---|---|---|---|---|
| 1. | "Magic Shop" | Jungkook; Hiss noise; RM; DJ Swivel; Candace Nicole Sosa; Suga; J-Hope; Adora | Jungkook; Hiss noise; ADORA | 4:36 |
| 2. | "Best of Me" | Andrew Taggart; Pdogg; Ray Michael Djan Jr; Ashton Foster; Sam Klempner; RM; "hitman" bang; Suga; J-Hope; Adora | Andrew Taggart; Pdogg | 3:46 |
| 3. | "Airplane Pt. 2" | Pdogg; RM; Ali Tamposi; Liza Owens; Roman Campolo; "hitman" bang; Suga; J-Hope | Pdogg | 3:39 |
| 4. | "고민보다 Go" (Gominboda Go / Go Go) | Pdogg; "hitman" bang; Supreme Boi | Pdogg | 3:55 |
| 5. | "Anpanman" | Pdogg; Supreme Boi; "hitman" bang | Pdogg | 3:54 |
| 6. | "Mic Drop" | Pdogg; Supreme Boi; "hitman" bang; J-hope; RM | Pdogg | 3:57 |
| 7. | "DNA" (Pedal 2 LA mix) | Pdogg; "hitman" bang; KASS; Supreme Boi; Suga; RM | "hitman" bang; DOCSKIM; Khan; Slow Rabbit | 4:07 |
| 8. | "Fake Love" (Rocking Vibe mix) | Pdogg; "hitman" bang; RM | Slow Rabbit | 3:58 |
| 9. | "Mic Drop" (Steve Aoki remix) (full length edition) | Pdogg; Supreme Boi; "hitman" bang; j-hope; RM | Steve Aoki | 5:08 |
| Total length: | | | | 37:00 |

Digital bonus track
| No. | Title | Writer(s) | Producer(s) | Length |
|---|---|---|---|---|
| 10. | "Idol" (featuring Nicki Minaj) | "hitman" bang; Roman Campolo; Pdogg; RM; Supreme Boi; Ali Tamposi; Onika Maraj | Pdogg | 4:20 |

== Charts ==
=== Weekly charts ===
Weekly chart performance
| Chart (2018–2020) | Peak position |
|---|---|
| Australian Albums (ARIA) | 9 |
| Austrian Albums (Ö3 Austria) | 14 |
| Belgian Albums (Ultratop Flanders) | 5 |
| Belgian Albums (Ultratop Wallonia) | 24 |
| Canadian Albums (Billboard) | 1 |
| Danish Albums (Hitlisten) | 8 |
| Dutch Albums (Album Top 100) | 5 |
| Estonian Albums (Eesti Ekspress) | 2 |
| Finnish Albums (Suomen virallinen lista) | 5 |
| French Albums (SNEP) | 49 |
| German Albums (Offizielle Top 100) | 23 |
| Greek Albums (IFPI) | 47 |
| Hungarian Albums (MAHASZ) | 10 |
| Irish Albums (IRMA) | 15 |
| Italian Albums (FIMI) | 18 |
| Japan Hot Albums (Billboard) | 1 |
| Japanese Albums (Oricon) | 1 |
| Mexican Albums (AMPROFON) | 6 |
| New Zealand Albums (RMNZ) | 11 |
| Norwegian Albums (VG-lista) | 25 |
| Polish Albums (ZPAV) | 48 |
| Scottish Albums (Official Charts) | 14 |
| South Korean Albums (Gaon) | 1 |
| Spanish Albums (PROMUSICAE) | 7 |
| Swedish Albums (Sverigetopplistan) | 20 |
| Swiss Albums (Schweizer Hitparade) | 13 |
| UK Albums (Official Charts) | 14 |
| UK Independent Albums (OCC) | 7 |
| US Billboard 200 | 1 |
| US Independent Albums (Billboard) | 1 |
| US Top Album Sales (Billboard) | 1 |
| US World Albums (Billboard) | 1 |

=== Monthly charts ===
Monthly chart performance
| Chart (2018) | Peak position |
|---|---|
| Japanese Albums (Oricon) | 6 |
| South Korean Albums (Gaon) | 1 |

=== Year-end charts ===
Year-end chart performance
| Chart (2018) | Position |
|---|---|
| Belgian Albums (Ultratop Flanders) | 105 |
| Dutch Albums (MegaCharts) | 70 |
| Japanese Albums (Oricon) | 14 |
| Mexican Albums (AMPROFON) | 69 |
| South Korean Albums (Gaon) | 1 |
| US Billboard 200 | 85 |
| US Independent Albums (Billboard) | 4 |
| US Top Album Sales (BuzzAngle) | 18 |
| US World Albums (Billboard) | 2 |
| Chart (2019) | Position |
| Belgian Albums (Ultratop Flanders) | 135 |
| French Albums (SNEP) | 189 |
| Hungarian Albums – Rank (MAHASZ) | 20 |
| Hungarian Albums – Sales (MAHASZ) | 45 |
| New Zealand Albums (RMNZ) | 50 |
| South Korean Albums (Gaon) | 14 |
| Spanish Albums (PROMUSICAE) | 90 |
| US Billboard 200 | 118 |
| US Independent Albums (Billboard) | 4 |
| US World Albums (Billboard) | 3 |
| Chart (2020) | Position |
| Belgian Albums (Ultratop Flanders) | 130 |
| Japanese Download Albums (Billboard Japan) | 80 |
| South Korean Albums (Gaon) | 49 |
| US Billboard 200 | 156 |
| Chart (2021) | Position |
| Belgian Albums (Ultratop Flanders) | 188 |
| Hungarian Albums (MAHASZ) | 73 |
| Japanese Albums (Oricon) | 56 |
| Japanese Download Albums (Billboard Japan) | 16 |
| South Korean Albums (Gaon) | 31 |
| Chart (2022) | Position |
| Japanese Download Albums (Billboard Japan) | 36 |
| South Korean Albums (Circle) | 65 |

== Certifications and sales ==
Certifications and sales
| Region | Certification | Certified units/sales |
|---|---|---|
| Canada (Music Canada) | Platinum | 80,000^{‡} |
| Denmark (IFPI Danmark) | Gold | 10,000^{‡} |
| France (SNEP) | Platinum | 100,000^{‡} |
| Hungary (MAHASZ) | Gold | 2,000^{‡} |
| Italy (FIMI) | Gold | 25,000^{‡} |
| Japan (RIAJ) | Gold | 236,375 |
| New Zealand (RMNZ) | Platinum | 15,000^{‡} |
| Poland (ZPAV) | Gold | 10,000^{‡} |
| Singapore (RIAS) | Gold | 5,000^{*} |
| South Korea (KMCA) | 3× Million | 2,731,330 |
| United Kingdom (BPI) | Gold | 100,000^{‡} |
| United States (RIAA) | Platinum | 199,865 |
^{*} Sales figures based on certification alone.^{‡} Sales+streaming figures based on certification alone.

== Release history ==
| Country | Date | Format | Label |
|---|---|---|---|
| South Korea | August 24, 2018 | CD; digital download; streaming | Big Hit; iriver |
| Japan | August 24, 2018 | CD; digital download; streaming | Big Hit; iriver; Virgin |
| United States | August 24, 2018 | CD; digital download; streaming | Big Hit; iriver; Columbia |
| Various | August 24, 2018 | Digital download; streaming | Big Hit |

== See also ==
- List of best-selling albums in South Korea
- List of K-pop songs on the Billboard charts
- List of K-pop albums on the Billboard charts
- List of Gaon Album Chart number ones of 2018
