= Makuhari Messe =

Japanese convention center in the Mihama-ku of Chiba city

Coordinates: 35°38′54″N 140°02′05″E

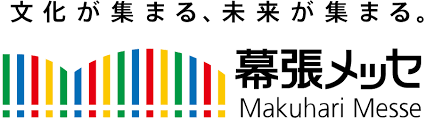

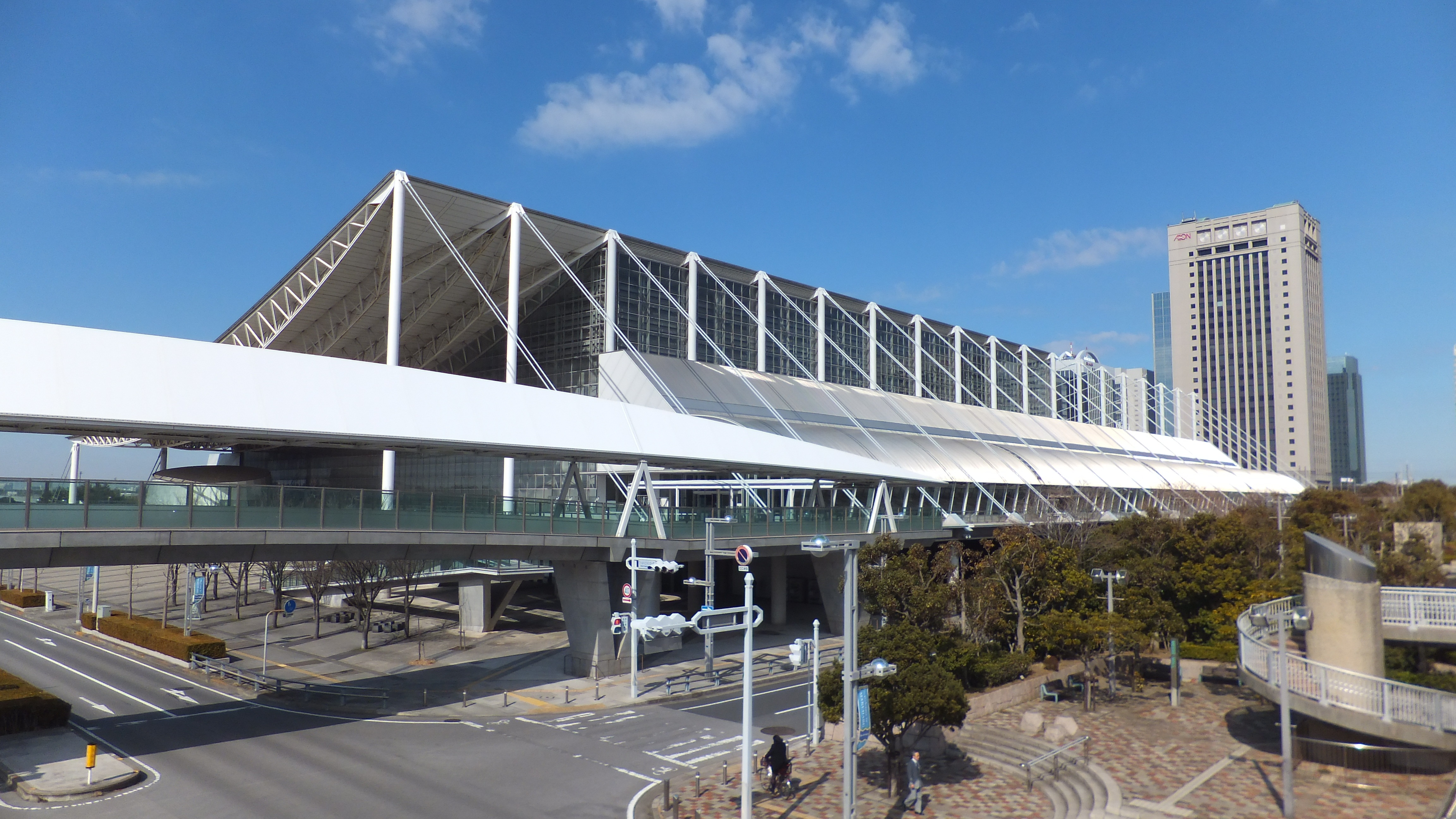
- Exterior view of the North Hall in 2012
- Interactive map of Makuhari Messe
- Address: 2–1, Nakase, Mihama-ku, Chiba, Chiba Prefecture, 261-8550, Japan
- Location: Greater Tokyo Area
- Owner: Makuhari Messe, Inc.
- Capacity: Detailed venue capacity: 1,600 (Internatinal Conference Hall); 7,860 (Makuhari Event Hall)
- Public transit: East Japan Railway Company (JR East): Keiyo Line at Kaihimmakuhari

Construction
- Opened: 9 October 1989; 37 years ago
- Expanded: October 1997; 29 years ago

Website
- www.m-messe.co.jp/en/

Makuhari Messe (幕張メッセ) is a convention center in Chiba City, Chiba Prefecture, Japan, located just outside of Tokyo. Designed by Fumihiko Maki, it is accessible by Tokyo's commuter rail system. Makuhari is the name of the area, and Messe is a German language word meaning "trade fair".

The convention center opened on 9 October 1989. It hosts many high-technology events.

Makuhari Messe is close to Tokyo Disney Resort in Urayasu, and to Chiba prefecture's black sand beaches. It is accessible from Kaihimmakuhari station on the Keiyō Line of East Japan Railway Company (JR East). The center is host to many annual events and trade shows, including: Tokyo Auto Salon (modified car show, in January), the biennial Tokyo Motor Show (in October), the annual Tokyo Game Show (video game hardware and software exhibition, in September), the annual Jump Festa (manga, anime, and video game exposition, in December), the biannual Wonder Festival (toys, scale figures, and garage kits exposition, in February and July) and some stages of the Summer Sonic music festival. The venue was also host to several Nintendo Space World events for many years.

It was the venue for several sports during the Tokyo 2020 Olympic and Paralympic Games.

== Notable events ==
On 14–15 June 1997, the first official Pokémon Trading Card Game tournament was held here.

On 31 July 1999, rock band GLAY held Glay Expo '99 Survival in the venue's parking lot. The concert garnered a total audience of 200,000 people, making it the largest-ticketed concert ever held by a single act at the time, as certified by the Guinness World Records.

From 19 to 21 July 2008, Lucasfilm presented a Star Wars Celebration Japan event at the venue to celebrate the 30th anniversary of the Japanese premiere of Star Wars. Another Star Wars Celebration was held at the venue from 18 to 20 April 2025.

The "Jack in the Box 2009 Summer" convention was held here on 15 August 2009, where numerous well-known acts performed, including the reunion performance of influential metal band Dead End.

It was scheduled to host the Anime Contents Expo, hosted by the Comic-10 Shakai in March 2011 to counter the Tokyo International Anime Fair as part of their boycott of the Tokyo Metropolitan Government under Governor Shintarō Ishihara, but both events were cancelled after the 2011 Tōhoku earthquake and tsunami. The first Anime Contents Expo was held on 31 March and 1 April 2012, and was visited by 42,000 people.

The heavy metal annual festival tour Ozzfest took place here on 11–12 May 2013. This was the festival's first appearance in Japan.

Kawaii metal band Babymetal has played a number of concerts here including the Legend 1997 show on 21 December 2013 for singer Su-metal's 16th birthday, which was recorded for live DVD. On their 2015 World Tour, they would again play here and release the performance on live DVD as part of the Trilogy: Metal Resistance Episode III – Apocalypse limited edition DVD set available only to members of "The One".

Ariana Grande played three shows at the arena for her 2017 Dangerous Woman Tour performing to over 52,000 people.

On 20–21 March 2021, rock band Alexandros held their 10th anniversary "Where's My Yoyogi?" concerts here. The 21 March concert was released as a live DVD and Blu-ray titled Where's My Yoyogi? at Makuhari & Documentary on 28 July 2021.

Makuhari Messe became the venue for four sports during the Tokyo 2020 Olympics. The sports of fencing, taekwondo, karate, and wrestling were originally to be staged at Tokyo Big Sight. This move was a part of cost-cutting measures implemented by the organisers. Karate has since been moved to the Nippon Budokan. Assigned halls for the Games are:

- Hall A: For the Olympic Games, taekwondo and wrestling; then for the Paralympic Games, sitting volleyball;
- Hall B: For the Olympic Games, fencing; then for the Paralympic Games, taekwondo and wheelchair fencing;
- Hall C: For the Paralympic Games, goalball.

On 5-6 July 2025, Jin performed in Hall 4-6 as part of his RunSeokjin Ep. Tour.

== Gallery ==
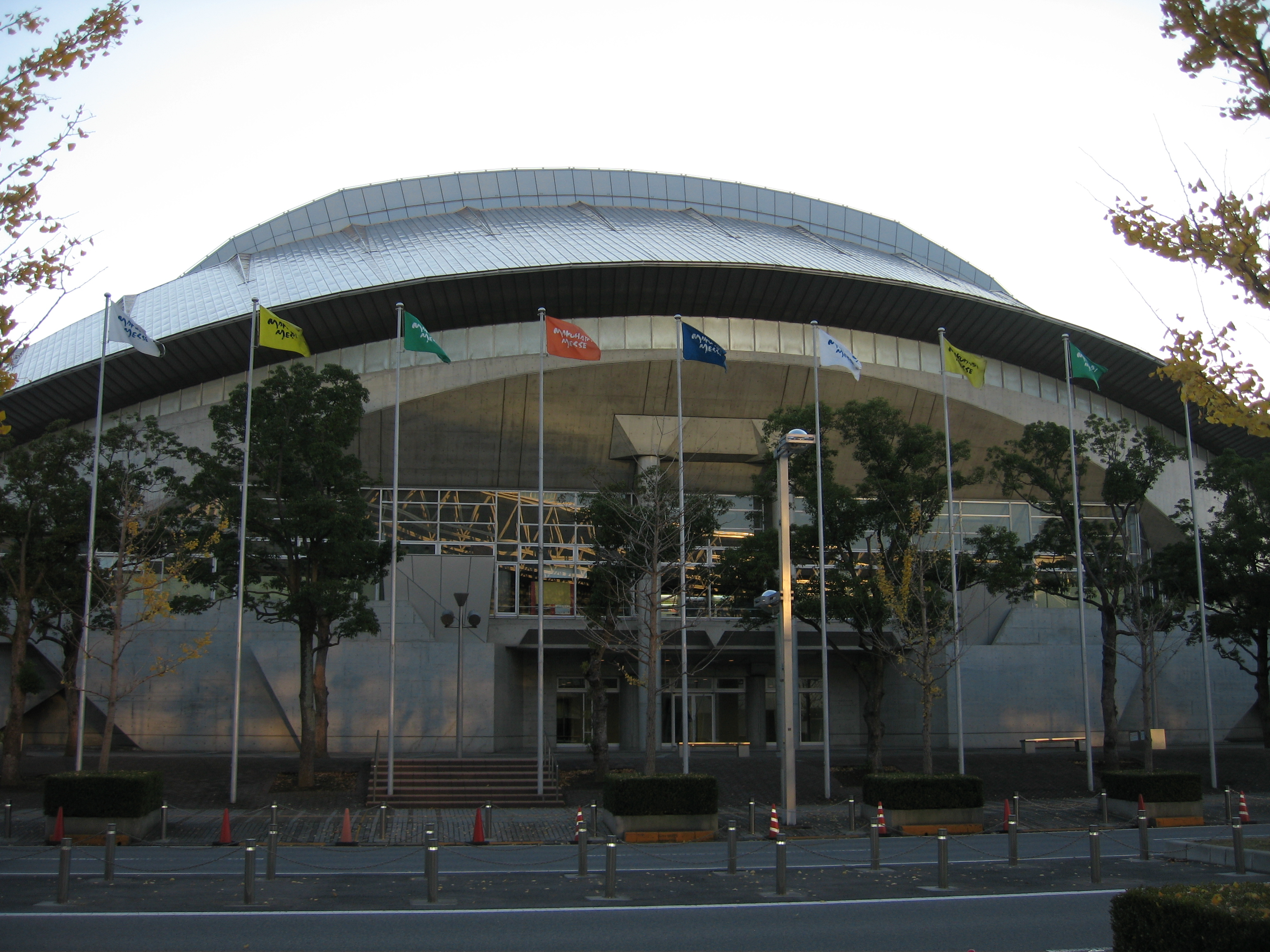
Makuhari Messe Event Hall

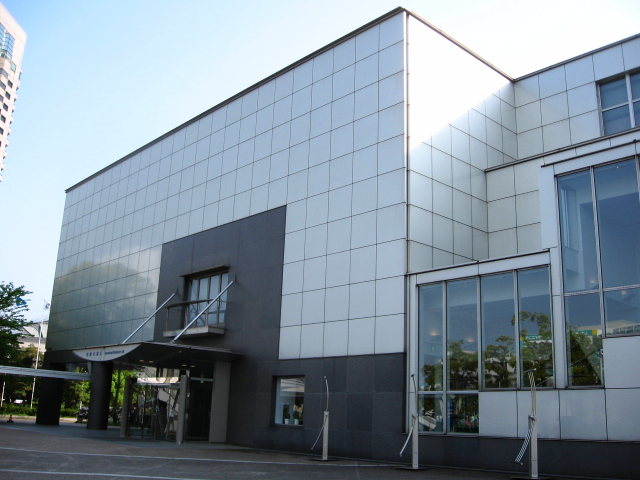
International Conference Hall of Makuhari Messe

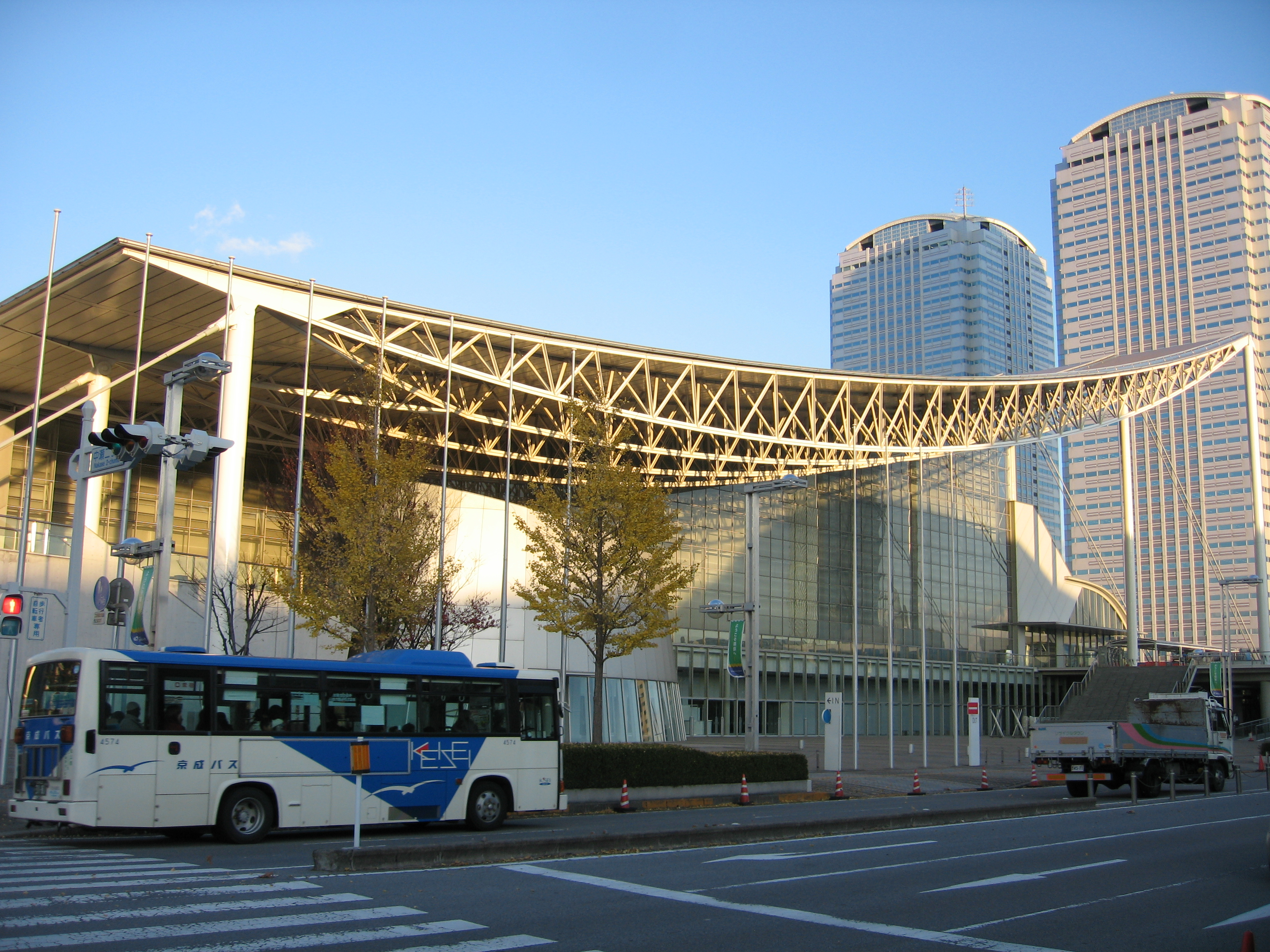
Makuhari Messe International Exhibition Hall 9 - 11 Hall (From Makuhari Event Hall side).

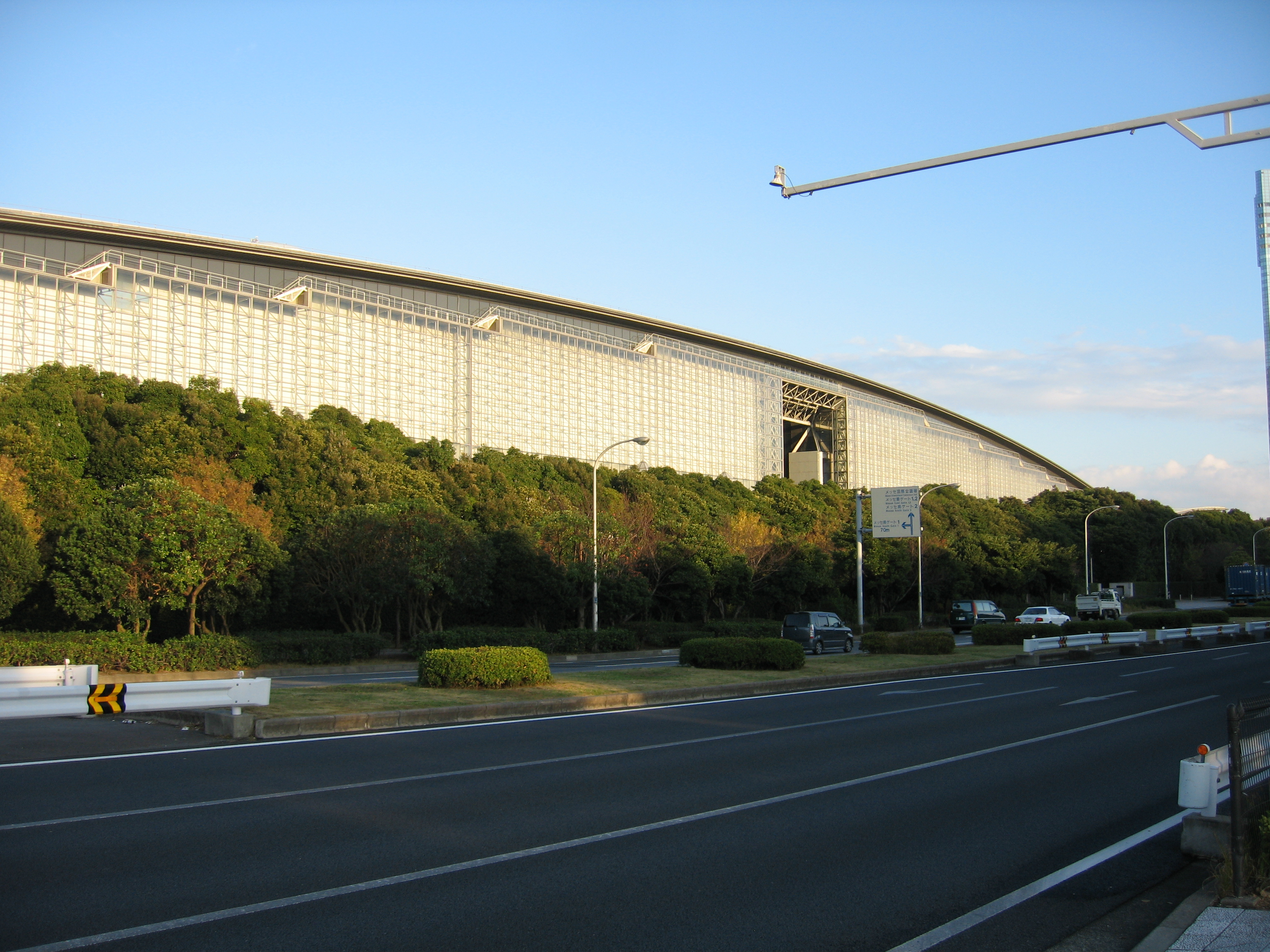
Makuhari Messe International Exhibition Hall 1 - 8 Hall (From Chiba Marine Stadium side).

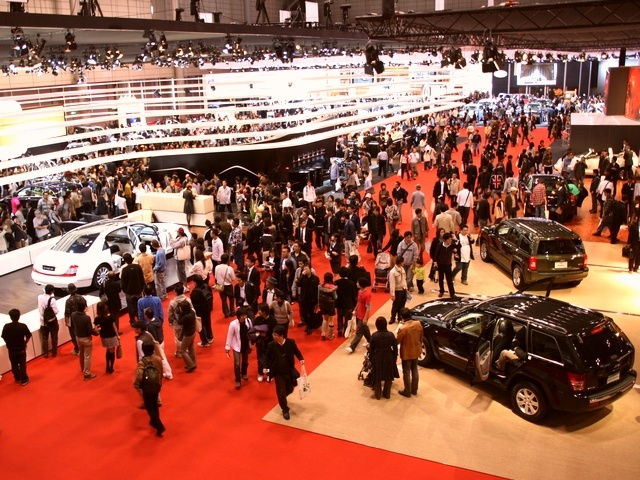
Tokyo Motor Show (2007)

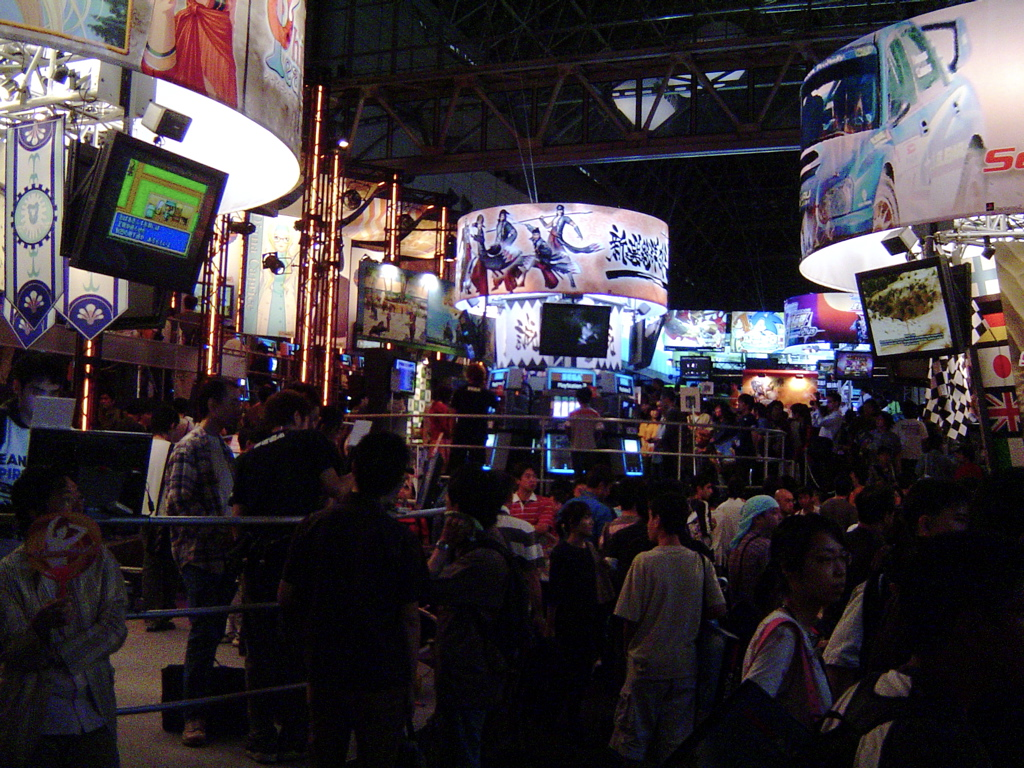
Tokyo Game Show (2004)

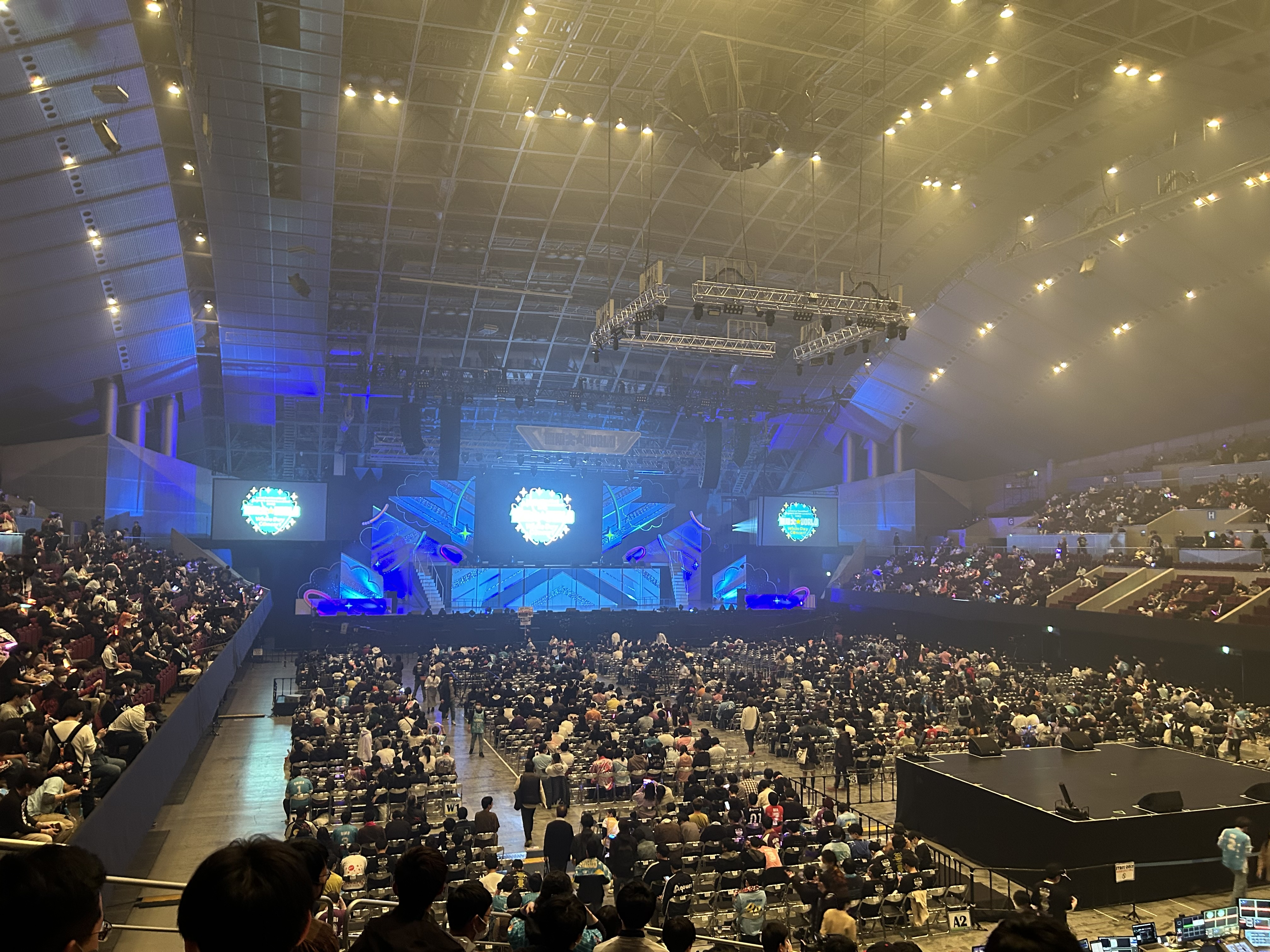
Interior of Makuhari Event Hall before a live event of Aqours

Preceded by Sportovní hala, Prague	World Figure Skating Championships; Venue; 1994	Succeeded by National Indoor Arena, Birmingham
