= Echo (EP) =

- Digital cover

EP by Jin
- Released: May 16, 2025
- Genre: Pop rock
- Length: 20:26
- Language: Korean; English
- Label: Big Hit
- Producer: Matt Attard; Arcades; Sean Fischer; Ghstloop; Jin; James Keys; Enrique Maza; Yojiro Noda; Pdogg; Wyatt Sanders; Tiggs; Martin Wave

Jin chronology
Happy (2024)	Echo (2025)

Singles from Echo
- 1. "Don't Say You Love Me" Released: May 16, 2025

Echo is the second extended play (EP) by South Korean singer Jin of BTS, released on May 16, 2025, through Big Hit Music.

== Background and release ==
Echo was announced on April 15, with Big Hit Music confirming that the album would contain seven tracks, including the lead single "Don't Say You Love Me" on April 17. The album features a guest appearance from Yena on the track "Loser".

In support of the album, Jin embarked on his first solo world tour RunSeokjin Ep. Tour.

== Composition ==
Echo consists of seven tracks. It has been described as a pop rock album that delves into influences of "Eighties-style synth pop", country, and various sub-genres of rock, including Brit rock, pop punk, country rock, metal, and alternative rock. Thematically, Echo was noted to be based on Jin's perspective on universal life experiences, with the record "capturing everyday emotions with warmth and sincerity". In a track-by-track review on Billboard, Jeff Benjamin noted that the EP once again included rock as the genre that "shaped [Jin's] musical identity," but contained "deeper stories [compared to Happy] that can resonate on a more human level."

== Critical reception ==
Professional ratings
Aggregate scores
Source	Rating
Metacritic	81/100
Review scores
Source	Rating
AllMusic	4.5/5 stars
Clash	8/10
NME	3/5 stars
Rolling Stone	3.5/5 stars

Echo generally received positive reviews from critics. At Metacritic, which assigns a normalised rating out of 100 to reviews from mainstream critics, the album has an average score of 81 based on four reviews, indicating "universal acclaim". Writing for Clash, Maria Leticia Gomes positively described the album as introspective and cohesive, recognizing Jin's emotive delivery as its key strength. Rolling Stone's Rob Sheffield scored Echo three and a half out of five stars, labeling it as an "expansively romantic" album defined by "the confidence of a star who'd never been away".

In a mixed review, Rhian Daly of NME praised the album for its emotive vocal delivery but commented on the inconsistent quality of its music, noting that "not everything works".

== Track listing ==
Echo track listing
No.	Title	Writer(s)	Producer(s)	Length
1.	"Don't Say You Love Me"	Nathan Fertig; Wyatt Sanders	Sanders; Tiggs	3:00
2.	"Nothing Without Your Love"	Ben Samama; Danke; Digital Farm Animals; Ellie Suh (153/Joombas); Jin; Jinli (Full8loom); Lee Seu-ran; Matt Attard; Matt Thomson; Max Graham; Pdogg; Kim ChaeA (153/Joombas); Lee Ang Doo (153/Joombas); Lee Eun Hwa (153/Joombas)	Pdogg; Attard; Arcades	2:56
3.	"Loser" (featuring Yena)	Ciara Muscat; Danke; Ghstloop; Jin; Jinli; Kang Eun Jeong; Liljune (153/Joombas); Attard; Thomson; Graham; Pdogg; Ryan Bickley; Saeyoung (153/Joombas); TRUE (153/Joombas)	Pdogg; Attard; Ghstloop; Arcades	2:35
4.	"Rope It"	Samama; Suh; Ghstloop; James Keys; Jin; Mun Yeo Reum; Oscar Bell; Pdogg; Saeyoung; sokodomo; TRUE	Pdogg; Ghstloop; Keys	2:45
5.	"With the Clouds" (구름과 떠나는 여행)	Adora; Jin; Pdogg; Yojiro Noda	Noda; Pdogg	3:08
6.	"Background"	bay (153/Joombas); Suh; Enrique Maza; Francis Karel; Jinli; Liv Miraldi; Martin Wave; Mia (153/Joombas); Neil Ormandy; Saeyoung; Sean Fischer; TRUE; Hwang Yoo Bin (XYXX)	Fischer; Wave; Maza	2:55
7.	"To Me, Today" (오늘의 나에게)	Chalee (153/Joombas); Jo Yoon-kyung; Danke; Suh; Ghstloop; jeanjinn jane; Ninos Hanna; Pdogg; sokodomo; William Segerdahl; Hwang	Pdogg	3:01
Total length:				20:26

== Personnel ==
Credits adapted from Tidal.

=== Musicians ===
- Jin – vocals
- Pdogg – vocal arrangement (all tracks); drum programming, keyboards, programming (tracks 2–7); guitar (2, 3), bass (2), synthesizer (3)
- Wyatt Sanders – background vocals, bass, keyboards, vocal arrangement (track 1)
- Tiggs – guitar, programming, vocal arrangement (track 1)
- Nathan Fertig – background vocals (track 1)
- James Keys – background vocals (tracks 2, 3, 5–7), guitar (4)
- Shin Min – strings conductor (tracks 2, 5)
- Yung String – violin (tracks 2, 5)
- Matt Thomson – bass, drum programming, guitar, keyboards, programming (tracks 2, 3)
- Max Graham – bass, drum programming, guitar, keyboards, programming (tracks 2, 3)
- Matt Attard – drum programming, keyboards, programming (tracks 2, 3); bass, guitar (2)
- Ben Samama – background vocals (track 2)
- Full8loom – background vocals (track 3)
- Ghstloop – drum programming, keyboards, programming (track 4)
- Oscar Bell – background vocals (track 4)
- Xin Qiao – background vocals (track 4)
- Noogi Park – bass (tracks 4–7)
- Ryu In-hyeok – guitar (track 4)
- Young – guitar (tracks 5–7)
- Yojiro Noda – bass, guitar, keyboards, programming (track 5)

=== Technical ===
- Chris Gehringer – mastering
- Mark "Spike" Stent – mixing (tracks 1, 3, 4)
- James F. Reynolds – mixing (track 2)
- Manny Marroquin – mixing (track 5)
- Yang Ga – mixing (tracks 6, 7)
- Pdogg – engineering, sound editing
- Wyatt Sanders – engineering (track 1)
- James Keys – engineering (tracks 2, 3, 5–7)
- Matt Thomson – engineering (tracks 2, 3)
- Kim Kyung-tae – engineering (tracks 2, 5)
- Oh Hyun-seok – engineering (tracks 2, 5)
- Matt Attard – engineering (track 2)
- Max Graham – engineering (track 2)
- Full8loom – engineering (track 3)
- Oscar Bell – engineering (track 4)
- Ghstloop – engineering (tracks 5–7), sound editing (2–7)
- Young – engineering (tracks 5–7)
- Yojiro Noda – engineering (track 5)
- Kieran Beadrmore – mixing assistance (tracks 1, 3, 4)
- Matt Wolach – mixing assistance (tracks 1, 3, 4)
- James Cunningham – mixing assistance (track 2)
- Ben Rugg – mixing assistance (track 5)
- Chris Galland – mixing assistance (track 5)

== Charts ==
=== Weekly charts ===
Weekly chart performance
Chart (2025)	Peak position
Australian Albums (ARIA)	76
Austrian Albums (Ö3 Austria)	7
Belgian Albums (Ultratop Flanders)	56
Belgian Albums (Ultratop Wallonia)	23
Canadian Albums (Billboard)	65
French Albums (SNEP)	30
German Albums (Offizielle Top 100)	15
Greek Albums (IFPI)	6
Hungarian Physical Albums (MAHASZ)	21
Japanese Albums (Oricon)	2
Japanese Combined Albums (Oricon)	2
Japanese Hot Albums (Billboard Japan)	2
Lithuanian Albums (AGATA)	11
New Zealand Albums (RMNZ)	29
Polish Albums (ZPAV)	9
Portuguese Albums (AFP)	112
Scottish Albums (OCC)	10
South Korean Albums (Circle)	2
Spanish Albums (PROMUSICAE)	23
Swiss Albums (Schweizer Hitparade)	12
UK Albums (OCC)	63
US Billboard 200	3
US World Albums (Billboard)	1

=== Monthly charts ===
Monthly chart performance
Chart (2025)	Position
Japanese Albums (Oricon)	5
South Korean Albums (Circle)	5

=== Year-end charts ===
Year-end chart performance
Chart (2025)	Position
Japanese Albums (Oricon)	39
Japanese Download Albums (Billboard Japan)	24
Japanese Top Albums Sales (Billboard Japan)	41
South Korean Albums (Circle)	30

== Certifications ==
Certifications
Region	Certification	Certified units/sales
Japan (RIAJ)	Gold	100,000^{^}
South Korea (KMCA)	2× Platinum	500,000^{^}
^{^} Shipments figures based on certification alone.
