= Jin (singer) =

South Korean singer (born 1992)

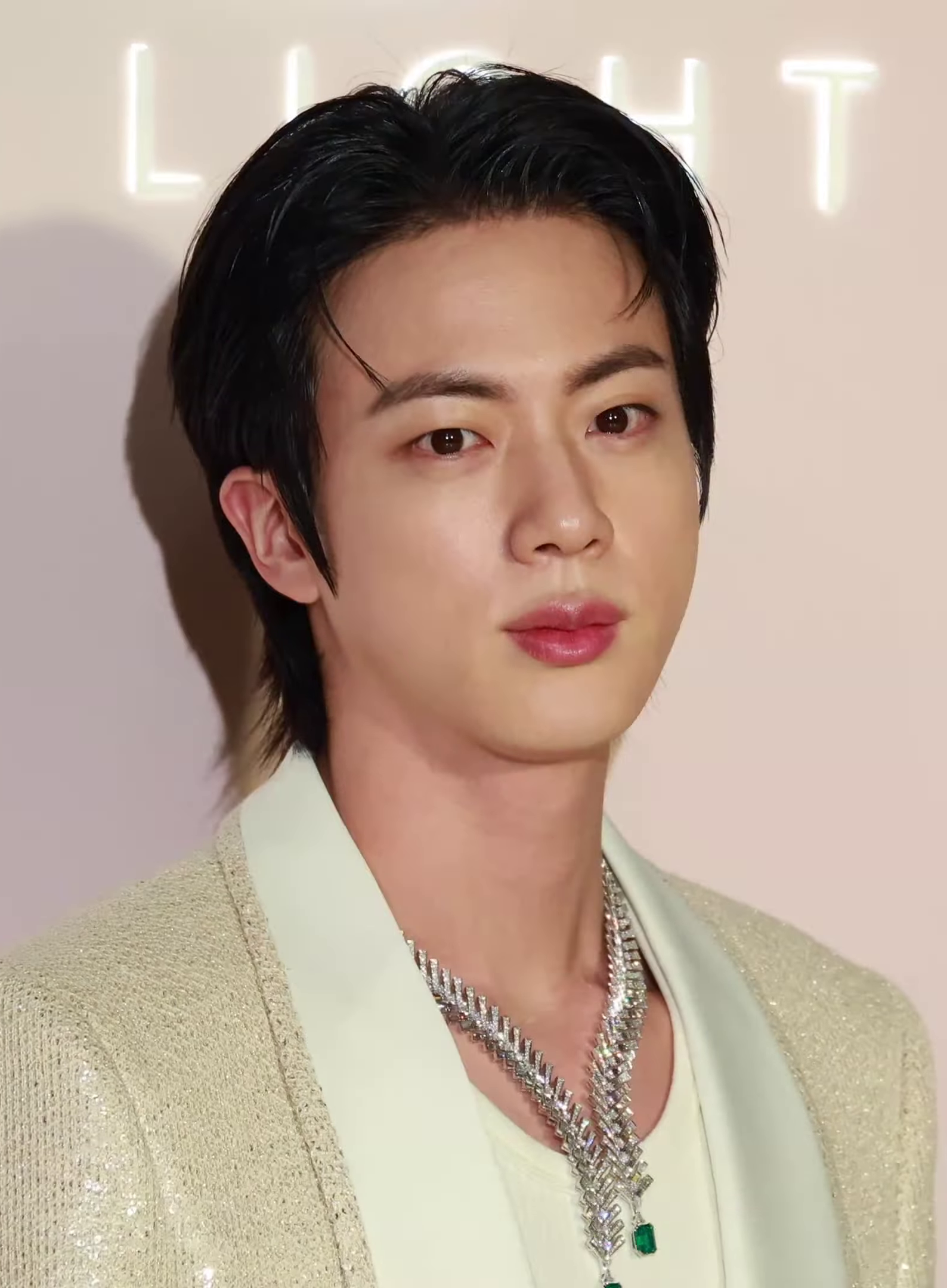
- Jin in March 2025
- Born: Kim Seok-jin; December 4, 1992 (age 33); Anyang, Gyeonggi, South Korea
- Education: Konkuk University
- Occupation: Singer
- Years active: 2013–present
- Honours: Hwagwan Order of Cultural Merit (2018)
- Musical career
- Genres: K-pop; pop rock
- Instrument: Vocals
- Label: Big Hit
- Member of: BTS

Korean name
- Hangul: 김석진
- Hanja: 金碩珍
- RR: Gim Seokjin
- MR: Kim Sŏkchin

Kim Seok-jin (Korean: 김석진; born December 4, 1992), known professionally as Jin, is a South Korean singer. He rose to prominence as member of the South Korean boy band BTS. Jin has released three solo tracks with BTS: "Awake" in 2016, "Epiphany" in 2018, and "Moon" in 2020, all of which have charted on South Korea's Gaon Digital Chart. In 2019, Jin released his first independent song, the digital track "Tonight". He made his official debut as a solo artist in October 2022, with the release of the single "The Astronaut".

Apart from singing, Jin appeared as a host on multiple South Korean music programs from 2016 to 2018. In 2018, he was awarded the fifth-class Hwagwan Order of Cultural Merit by the President of South Korea along with his bandmates for his contributions to Korean culture.

== Early life and education ==
Kim Seok-jin was born on December 4, 1992, in Anyang, Gyeonggi Province, South Korea. His family consists of his mother, father, and elder brother. He is of the Gwangsan Kim clan. In 2007, he traveled to Australia for a study camp in order to learn English.

Jin originally wanted to be a journalist but decided to pursue acting after watching Kim Nam-gil in Queen Seondeok. While in junior high school, he was scouted by South Korean K-pop agency SM Entertainment off the street, but rejected the offer at the time. Initially intending to be an actor, Jin attended Konkuk University and graduated with a degree in Film Studies on February 22, 2017. He later enrolled in graduate school at Hanyang Cyber University to pursue studies in areas other than music.

== Career ==
=== 2013–present: BTS ===
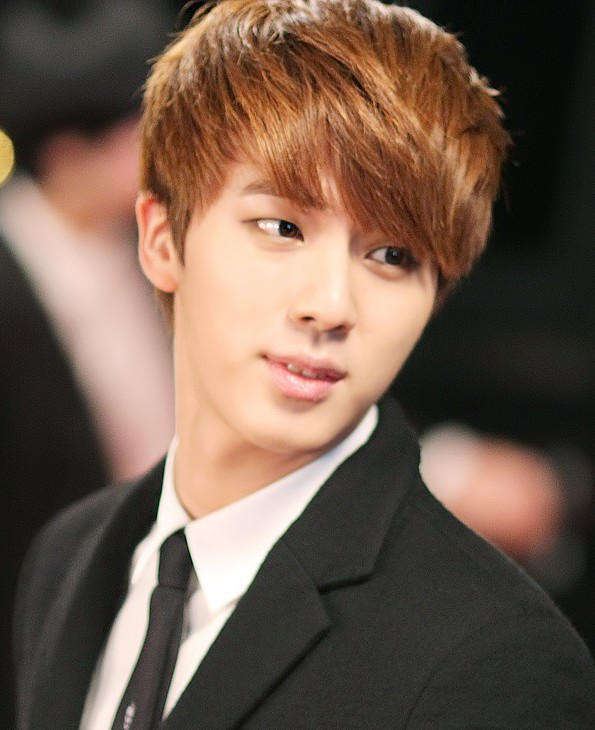
Jin at the 2013 Melon Music Awards

Jin was scouted by Big Hit Entertainment for his looks while walking down the street—he was studying acting at the time and had no background in music—and subsequently auditioned as an actor for the company before becoming an idol trainee. On June 13, 2013, he made his debut as one of the four vocalists in BTS. Under the band's name, Jin has performed three solo songs: "Awake", "Epiphany", and "Moon". "Awake", which he co-produced, was released in 2016, as part of BTS' second Korean studio album Wings. The song peaked at number 31 on the Gaon Digital Chart and number six on the Billboard World Digital Song Sales chart in the United States. He shared a Christmas version of "Awake" for free on SoundCloud that December.

"Epiphany" was released as a trailer for BTS' then upcoming compilation album, Love Yourself: Answer, on August 9, 2018. Described as a "building pop-rock melody" by Billboard, the song's lyrics discussed self-acceptance and self-love. The full version of the song was eventually released as a track on Answer, peaking at number 30 on the Gaon Digital Chart and number four on the US World Digital Song Sales chart. In October, Jin was awarded the fifth-class Hwagwan Order of Cultural Merit by South Korean president Moon Jae-in alongside his bandmates.

"Moon" was released in 2020, as part of BTS' fourth Korean studio album Map of the Soul: 7. Variety writer Jae-Ha Kim described the track as a power pop song addressed to the band's fans. "Moon" peaked at number one on the Gaon Digital Chart and number two on the World Digital Song Sales chart.

In July 2021, Jin was appointed Special Presidential Envoy for Future Generations and Culture by President Moon Jae-in, alongside his bandmates, to help "lead the global agenda for future generations" and "expand South Korea's diplomatic efforts and global standing" in the international community.

=== 2015–2022: Solo activities pre-enlistment ===
In 2016, Jin collaborated with bandmate V on the single "It's Definitely You", released as part of the Hwarang: The Poet Warrior Youth original soundtrack, and later received a co-nomination for Best OST at the 2017 Melon Music Awards. In June 2018, Jin featured on an alternate version of "So Far Away", a song from bandmate Suga's debut mixtape Agust D (2016), alongside bandmate Jungkook, which was released during the band's fifth anniversary celebrations. Jin's solo covers include "Mom" by Ra.D, "I Love You" by Mate, and "In Front Of The Post Office In Autumn", originally by Yoon Do-hyun in 1994. They were released on SoundCloud on May 7, 2015, December 3, 2015, and June 7, 2018, respectively. He has also made several appearances as a co-host for Korean music award shows, such as Music Bank and Inkigayo.

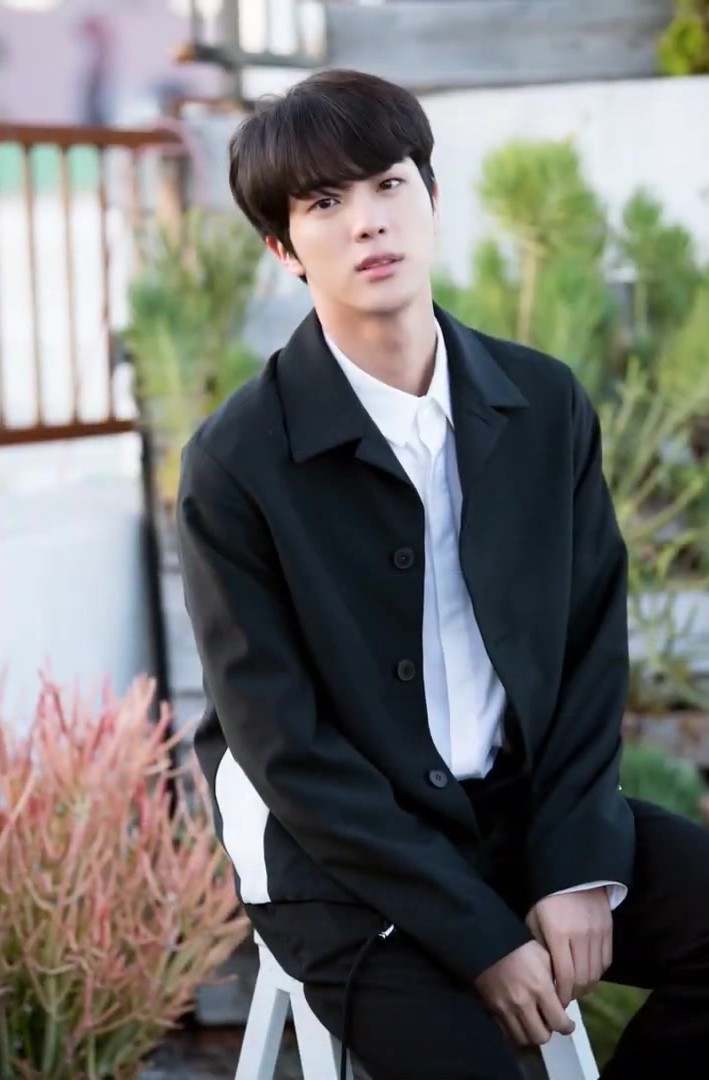
Jin in 2018

On June 4, 2019, Jin released his first independent song "Tonight" via SoundCloud as part of BTS' sixth anniversary celebrations. The acoustic ballad was composed by Jin and Big Hit record producers Slow Rabbit and Hiss Noise. Written by Jin and bandmate RM, the song's lyrics are inspired by Jin's relationship with his pets. The track was met with a generally positive reception, with praise for Jin's vocals and the song's calming atmosphere.

Jin released his second independent song "Abyss" via SoundCloud and YouTube on December 3, 2020. An acoustic ballad inspired by his feelings of anxiety, doubt, and burnout, Jin co-wrote and co-composed the track with RM and record producers Bumzu and Pdogg. In a post to the official BTS blog, Jin spoke about his insecurities regarding music and how those darker emotions drove him to write and release the song.

In October 2021, Jin sang the main theme for the TvN drama series Jirisan. Titled "Yours", the single's release was accompanied by a music video featuring footage from the show. On December 4, Jin released the short trot-style song "Super Tuna" via SoundCloud as a gift to fans in celebration of his 29th birthday. It quickly went viral after an accompanying performance video was posted on the BTS YouTube channel that same day. The video ranked first on YouTube's World Popular Music Video for eight consecutive days and trended in 56 countries, including Korea, Peru, and Singapore. A subsequent dance challenge arose on TikTok, with videos using the sound receiving over 141.8 million cumulative views in 10 days.

Jin collaborated with Nexon in August 2022 as a special game developer for MapleStory. The project was chronicled in the form of a two-episode mini web series, Office Warrior Kim Seok Jin, published to MapleStory Korea's YouTube channel. On October 21, "Tonight", "Abyss", and "Super Tuna" were made available on streaming services worldwide as official singles under Jin's name. All three songs subsequently simultaneously occupied the top three of the November 5 issue of the World Digital Song Sales chart, making Jin the third solo artist in the history of the chart to do so. Jin released his debut solo single "The Astronaut", which he co-wrote with the British rock band Coldplay, on October 28. He performed the song live with the band later that same day in Buenos Aires, Argentina during their Music of the Spheres World Tour; the show was broadcast live to cinemas worldwide in over 70 countries. The single earned Jin his first solo entry on the Billboard Hot 100 at number 51 and his third number one on the World chart.

The following month, South Korean food manufacturing company Ottogi announced Jin as the new advertising model for its Jin Ramen instant noodles brand; a commercial featuring Jin was released on November 11. The partnership was a success, with Ottogi recording the highest first quarter exports with 15.4% increase in domestic sales and 40% increase from US subsidiary in 2023.

On November 12, the first two episodes of Jin's web show The Drunken Truth (also known as Jin's Traditional Alcohol Journey) aired on BANGTANTV channel on YouTube; episodes 3 and 4 aired a week later on November 19. On the show, Jin learned the process of brewing alcohol, including makgeolli, with veteran alcohol artisan Park Rok-dam and celebrity chef Baek Jong-won. On December 13, Jin began his military enlistment.

=== 2024–present: Solo activities post-enlistment ===
Following his discharge from the military in June 2024, Jin hosted a fan event at Jamsil Arena in honor of BTS' 11th anniversary, then served as a torchbearer for the South Korean delegation at the Summer Olympics in Paris. On August 13, the first episode of Jin's weekly variety show Run Jin, a spin-off of Run BTS, aired on YouTube. Each episode of Run Jin features Jin competing in activities by himself or with different guests.

Jin was appointed the first global brand ambassador for the French jewellery and watch brand Fred, with a global ambassadorship for Gucci following that. In September, he became the first male global ambassador for Laneige and the face of its Cream Skin campaign. In October, Jin was named the global ambassador of Alo Yoga; of the partnership, vice president of marketing and creative at Alo Yoga Summer Nacewicz said Jin "has the ability to ignite change through his powerful platform." A new campaign launched in January 2025, ahead of the brand's first South Korea flagship store opening in April 2025.

An extended version of his 2021 single "Super Tuna" was released in October, along with a new music video. Big Hit published news of Jin's debut mini album, Happy, shortly afterwards. Comprising six tracks, the album was released on November 15. It was supported by two singles: "I'll Be There"—released October 25—and "Running Wild"—released the same day as the album. The latter earned Jin his second entry on the US Hot 100, at number 35. Happy peaked at number 2 on Billboard US World Albums and number 4 on Billboard 200. It is certified platinum in Japan and 3× Platinum in Korea. In November, Jin appeared as a guest on the tvN variety show Handsome Guys. In December, it was announced that Jin will sing the theme song for the TvN drama series When the Stars Gossip.

On February 26, 2025, Jin was named as the global brand ambassador of Jin Ramen. In April, Jin appeared on Netflix's variety show Kian's Bizarre B&B, along with Kim Hee-min, better known as Kian84, and actress Ji Ye-eun. On April 14, Big Hit announced that Jin's second album, Echo, would be released on May 16. It charted at number 3 on Billboard 200, while its lead single "Don't Say You Love Me" entered the Billboard Hot 100 at number 90. He also embarked on his first solo tour, RunSeokjin Ep. Tour, during the summer: the tour began on June 28–29 in Goyang before heading to Chiba, Osaka, Anaheim, Dallas, Tampa, Newark, London, and Amsterdam. The tour concluded on November 1, 2025, in Incheon.

== Artistry ==
Jin is a tenor and plays the guitar. In the 2019 novel BTS: The Review, members of the Grammy panel praised Jin's stable breath control and strong falsetto, calling it a "silver voice". Journalist Choi Song-hye of Aju News noted that BTS' singles such as "Spring Day" and "Fake Love" displayed Jin's vocal stability, while the B-side "Jamais Vu" showcased his emotional range. Hong Hye-min of The Korea Times described Jin's voice as "tender, sorrowful, [and] free-spirited" and considered it to be the "standout element" on the solo ballad "Epiphany". Critic Park Hee-a, discussing "Epiphany", stated that Jin "sings the most sentimental emotions" of the solo tracks on Love Yourself: Answer (2018). In a review of "Fake Love", Park said that Jin's belting "prove[d] [the song's] effectiveness".

== Public image ==
=== Philanthropy ===
In December 2018, Jin donated food, blankets, and dishes for the Korean Animal Welfare Association to celebrate his birthday. He also donated 321 kilograms of food to the Korea Animal Rights Advocates (KARA), another Korean animal welfare non-profit organization.

Since May 2018, Jin has been a monthly donor to UNICEF Korea, requesting that his donations be kept private at the time. They were eventually publicized following his induction into the UNICEF Honors Club in May 2019 for donating over ₩100 million (about US$84,000).

In January 2025, Jin donated ₩100 million to Korea University Medical Center, as part of its 'Global Goodwill Life Love Project,' to help patients in underdeveloped countries who suffer from economic difficulties and lack of medical services.

=== Influence ===
In 2019, Jin was ranked as the overall 13th most popular idol and sixth among girls aged 13–19 in South Korea, via data collected by analytics company Gallup Korea.

== Personal life ==
As of 2018, Jin lives in Hannam-dong, Seoul, South Korea.

=== Business ventures ===
He and his older brother opened a Japanese-style restaurant in Seoul called Otsu Seiromushi in 2018.

In December 2024, Korea Economic Daily reported that Jin and Baek Jong-won plan to launch a new liquor brand, Igin, through Yesan Doga, the agricultural corporation the two established and affiliate of Baek's Theborn Korea. Igin will incorporates the characteristics and local produce of Yesan, hometown of Baek. Park Rok-dam, veteran alcohol artisan who previously appeared in Jin's web show The Drunken Truth, will lend his expertise to the brand as well.

Igin Apple Gin, a 40%-ABV distilled liquor made from Korean rice and apples, will reportedly spearhead the brand, along with two ready-to-drink cocktail varieties at 4% ABV each: a tangy apple and plum flavored drink and a sweet apple and watermelon drink.

=== Health ===
In March 2022, Jin injured his left hand and underwent surgery to correct it, following which he abstained from certain performances during BTS' Permission to Dance on Stage concerts in Las Vegas, withdrew from some group events, and sang while seated for most of the band's performance at the 64th Annual Grammy Awards.

=== Military service ===
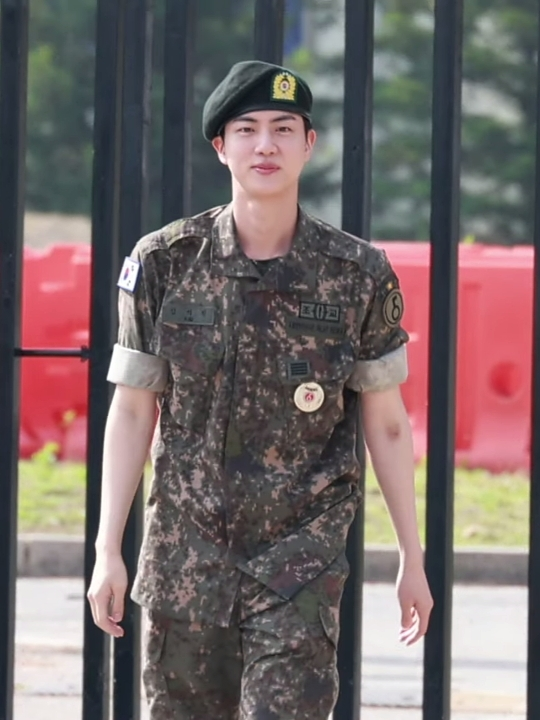
Jin on June 12, 2024

On October 17, 2022, Big Hit announced that following the release of "The Astronaut" and the completion of its subsequent promotional activities at the end of that month, Jin would begin the enlistment process and carry out his mandatory military service. The singer was previously granted an automatic postponement in 2021 until the end of 2022, following revisions made to the Military Service Act in December 2020. On November 4, 2022, Jin filed paperwork with the Military Manpower Administration (MMA) requesting a termination of the postponement in order to proceed with his conscription. He enlisted as an active duty soldier on December 13 at the Yeoncheon army base in the North Gyeonggi Province. Following the completion of his basic training with the 5th Infantry Division in January 2023, Jin was appointed as an assistant training instructor with the same division. He was formally discharged on June 12, 2024, becoming the first member of BTS to complete their military obligations.

== Discography ==
=== Extended plays ===
Title	Details	Peak chart positions										Sales	Certifications
Title	Details	KOR	AUS	AUT	CAN	FRA	GER	JPN	NZ	SWI	US	Sales	Certifications
Happy	Released: November 15, 2024; Label: Big Hit; Format: CD, digital download, streaming	3	51	7	43	20	16	2	16	11	4	KOR: 1,053,143; JPN: 224,585; US: 66,000	KMCA: 3× Platinum; RIAJ: Platinum
Echo	Released: May 16, 2025; Label: Big Hit; Format: CD, digital download, streaming	2	76	7	65	30	15	2	29	12	3	KOR: 837,750; JPN: 153,340; US: 35,000	KMCA: 2× Platinum; RIAJ: Gold

=== Singles ===
List of singles, showing year released, select chart positions, and sales
Title	Year	Peak chart positions										Sales	Certifications	Album
Title	Year	KOR	AUS	CAN	HUN	JPN Hot	NZ Hot	UK	US	US World	WW	Sales	Certifications	Album
"It's Definitely You" (죽어도 너야) (with V)	2016	34	—	—	15	—	—	—	—	8	—	KOR: 76,657		Hwarang: The Poet Warrior Youth Original Soundtrack
"Tonight" (이 밤)	2019	—	—	—	22	—	—	—	— (Note: "Tonight" did not enter the Billboard Hot 100, but peaked at number 42 on the US Digital Songs Sales chart.)	3	—	JPN: 3,034 (Dig.)		Non-album single
"Abyss"	2020	—	—	—	14	—	—	—	— (Note: "Abyss" did not enter the Billboard Hot 100, but peaked at number 39 on the US Digital Songs Sales chart.)	2	—	JPN: 3,535 (Dig.)		Non-album single
"Yours"	2021	30	—	—	9	66	—	— (Note: "Yours" did not enter the UK Singles Chart, but peaked at number 14 on the UK Singles Downloads Chart.)	— (Note: "Yours" did not enter the Billboard Hot 100, but peaked at number 12 on the Bubbling Under Hot 100 chart.)	1	90	JPN: 10,971 (Dig.)		Jirisan Original Soundtrack
"Super Tuna" (슈퍼 참치)	2021	—	—	—	11	—	12	—	— (Note: "Super Tuna" did not enter the Billboard Hot 100, but peaked at number 19 on the US Digital Songs Sales chart.)	1	159	JPN: 3,424 (Dig.)		Non-album singles
"The Astronaut"	2022	40	69	58	1	4	5	61	51	1	10	KOR: 1,040,155 (Phy.); JPN: 171,330 (Note: Physical and digital pure sales combined); US: 44,000 (Dig.); WW: 62,000 (Dig.)	KMCA: Million (Phy.); RIAJ: Gold (Phy.)	Non-album singles
"I'll Be There"	2024	63	—	—	—	40	9	44	— (Note: "I'll Be There" did not enter the Billboard Hot 100, but peaked at number eight on the Bubbling Under Hot 100 chart.)	1	25	JPN: 6,651 (Dig.)		Happy
"Running Wild"	2024	69	—	68	—	24	6	25	53	—	5	JPN: 3,126 (Dig.)		Happy
"Falling" (네게 닿을 때까지) (solo or featuring Taka)	2024	150	—	—	—	41	32	—	—	1	—	JPN: 8,920 (Dig.)		Happy
"Close to You"	2025	118	—	—	—	—	32	—	—	1	—			When the Stars Gossip Original Soundtrack
"Don't Say You Love Me"	2025	89	—	87	—	28	5	58	90	—	6	WW: 32,000 (Dig.)		Echo
"—" denotes releases that did not chart or were not released in that region.

=== Other charted songs ===
List of charted songs, with selected chart positions
Title	Year	Peak chart positions									Sales	Album
Title	Year	KOR	KOR Hot	FRA Dig.	HUN	NZ Hot	SCO	UK Dig.	US World	WW	Sales	Album
"Awake" (Note: credited under BTS but is a solo performed by Jin)	2016	31	—	—	9	—	—	—	6	—	KOR: 105,382	Wings
"Epiphany"	2018	30	5	61	5	—	60	54	4	—	US: 10,000	Love Yourself: Answer
"Moon"	2020	22	12	—	11	—	64	61	4	—	—N/a	Map of the Soul: 7
"Another Level"	2024	149	—	—	—	30	—	—	2	—	—N/a	Happy
"Heart on the Window" (with Wendy)	2024	139	—	—	—	20	—	—	1	152	—N/a	Happy
"I Will Come to You" (그리움에)	2024	145	—	—	—	—	—	—	3	—	—N/a	Happy
"Running Wild" (Holiday Remix)	2024	— (Note: "Running Wild" (Holiday Remix) did not enter the Circle Digital Chart, but peaked at number 190 on the component Download Chart.)	—	—	—	—	—	—	—	—	—N/a	Running Wild (Remixes)
"Nothing Without Your Love"	2025	— (Note: "Nothing Without Your Love" did not enter the Circle Digital Chart, but peaked at number 6 on the component Download Chart.)	—	—	—	23	—	—	1	—	—N/a	Echo
"Loser" (featuring Yena)	2025	— (Note: "Loser" did not enter the Circle Digital Chart, but peaked at number 7 on the component Download Chart.)	—	—	—	26	—	—	4	—	—N/a	Echo
"Rope It"	2025	— (Note: "Rope It" did not enter the Circle Digital Chart, but peaked at number 12 on the component Download Chart.)	—	—	—	31	—	—	2	—	—N/a	Echo
"With the Clouds" (구름과 떠나는 여행)	2025	— (Note: "With the Clouds" did not enter the Circle Digital Chart, but peaked at number 9 on the component Download Chart.)	—	—	—	—	—	—	5	—	—N/a	Echo
"Background"	2025	— (Note: "Background" did not enter the Circle Digital Chart, but peaked at number 11 on the component Download Chart.)	—	—	—	—	—	—	3	—	—N/a	Echo
"To Me, Today" (오늘의 나에게)	2025	— (Note: "To Me, Today" did not enter the Circle Digital Chart, but peaked at number 10 on the component Download Chart.)	—	—	—	—	—	—	6	—	—N/a	Echo
"—" denotes releases that did not chart or were not released in that region.

=== Other songs ===
Title	Year	Format	Notes	Ref.
"Adult Child"	2013	Digital download, streaming	with RM and Suga	
"Awake" (Christmas ver.)	2016	Digital download, streaming	Holiday remix of the original track from Wings (2016)	
"So Far Away" (Suga featuring Jin and Jungkook)	2017	Digital download, streaming	re-release of the original track from Agust D (2016); Jin and Jungkook appear in place of Suran	

=== Writing credits ===
All song credits are adapted from the Korea Music Copyright Association's database, unless otherwise noted.

Name of song, featured performer, original release, and year of release
Song	Artist	Album	Year
"Outro: Circle Room Cypher"	BTS	2 Cool 4 Skool	2013
"Boyz with Fun"	BTS	The Most Beautiful Moment in Life, Part 1	2015
"Outro: Love Is Not Over"	BTS	The Most Beautiful Moment in Life, Part 1	2015
"Love Is Not Over"	BTS	The Most Beautiful Moment in Life: Young Forever	2016
"Awake"	BTS	Wings	2016
"Tonight"	Jin	Non-album release	2019
"Abyss"	Jin	Non-album release	2020
"In the Soop"	BTS	Non-album release	2020
"Moon"	BTS	Map of the Soul: 7	2020
"Stay"	BTS	Be	2020
"Skit"	BTS	Be	2020
"Super Tuna"	Jin	Non-album release	2021
"The Astronaut"	Jin	Non-album release	2022
"Another Level"	Jin	Happy	2024
"I'll Be There"	Jin	Happy	2024
"Longing"	Jin	Happy	2024
"Until It Reaches You"	Jin	Happy	2024

== Videography ==
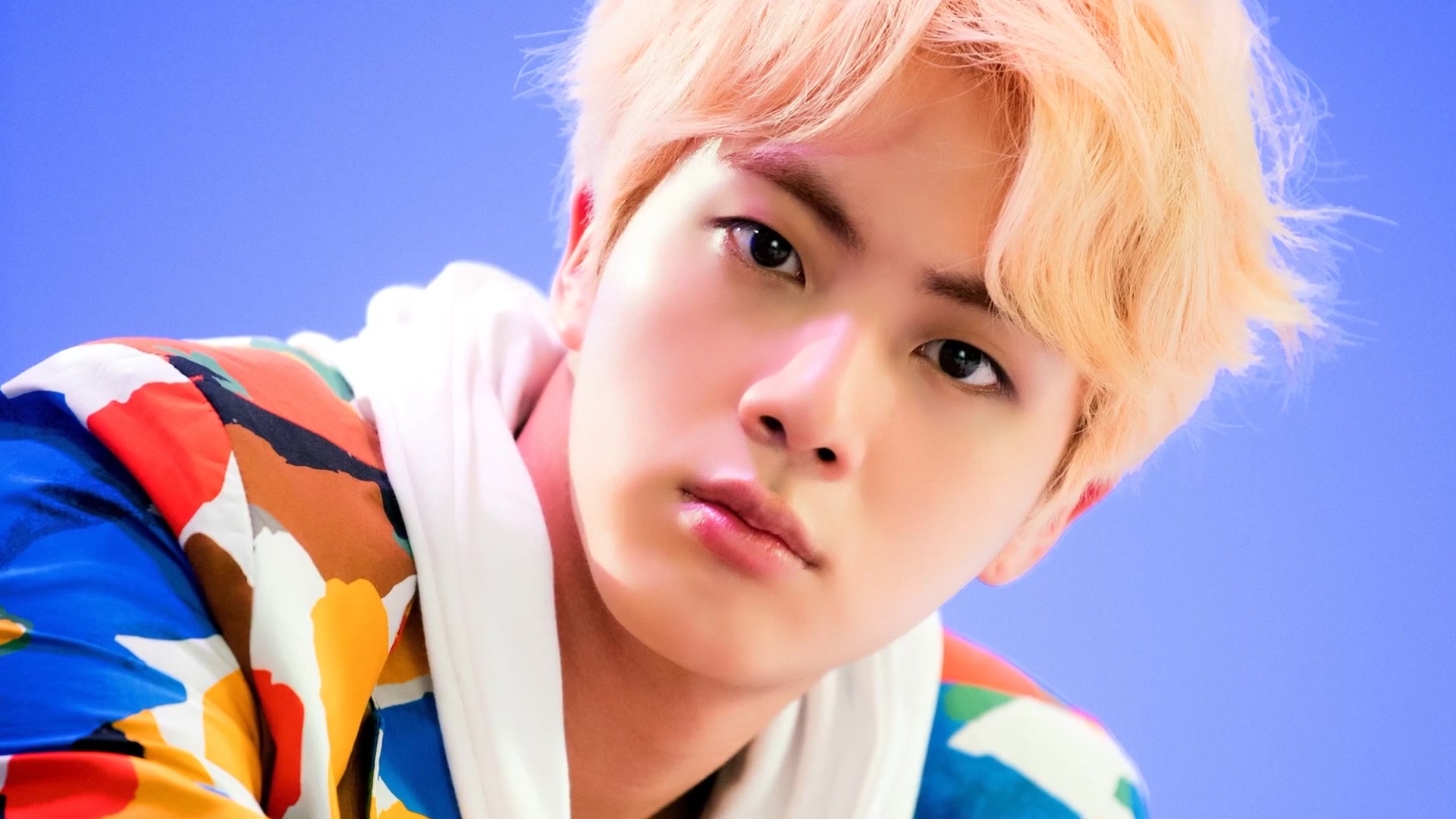
Jin while filming the "Idol" music video, July 19, 2018.

=== Music videos ===
Name of music video, year released, director, and additional notes
Title	Year	Director(s)	Notes	Ref.
"Epiphany"	2018	Yong-seok Choi (Lumpens)	Comeback trailer for BTS' third Korean-language compilation album Love Yourself: Answer	
"Super Tuna" (슈퍼 참치)	2021	—N/a	Jin dances to the song on a beach accompanied by two backup dancers while animated, ocean-related graphics appear on-screen. The choreography features fishing and fish-like dance moves. The song's co-producer Bumzu appears in the video as one of the dancers.	
"The Astronaut"	2022	Yong-seok Choi (Lumpens)	Jin portrays as an alien astronaut who accidentally crash-lands on Earth and must eventually choose between staying with his found family or returning to his home planet.	
"Super Tuna" (슈퍼 참치) Special Video	2024	—N/a	Filmed in Uljin, North Gyeongsang Province. As in the original version, Jin is shown performing the song at a beach. He is accompanied by two dancers in some scenes, while in others he is seen relaxing on the sand, fishing, and playfully interacting with a tuna fish. He eventually proposes to it, asking it to bite his fishing rod.	
"I'll Be There"	2024	Yong-seok Choi (Lumpens)	—N/a	
"Running Wild"	2024	Yong-seok Choi (Lumpens)	—N/a	
"Don't Say You Love Me"	2025	Yong-seok Choi (Lumpens)	—N/a	

- Jin also appeared in the short film "#7 Awake", directed by Yong-seok Choi of Lumpens and released on September 13, 2016, in promotion of BTS' fourth studio album Wings.

== Filmography ==
=== Film ===
Year	Title	Role	Notes	Ref.
2023	Coldplay – Music of the Spheres: Live at River Plate	Himself	Concert film	

=== Television ===
Jin television work
Year	Program	Role	Episode(s)	Note(s)	Ref.
2016	Inkigayo	Host	863	with RM, Kei, and Mijoo	
2016	M Countdown	Host	497	with Jimin	
2017	M Countdown	Host		with Jimin and J-Hope	
2017	Law of the Jungle in Kota Manado	Himself	247–251		
2017	KBS Song Festival	Host	—N/a	with Sana, Chanyeol, Irene, Solar, Mingyu, Yerin, and Kang Daniel	
2018	Music Bank	Host	932	with Solbin	
2018	KBS Song Festival	Host	—N/a	with Dahyun and Chanyeol	
2024	The Half-Star Hotel in Lost Island	Himself	15–16	Outdoor reality series featuring Ahn Jung-hwan	

=== Web shows ===
Web shows appearances
Year	Title	Role	Notes	Ref.
2022	The Drunken Truth	Host		
2024	Run Jin	Host		
2025	Kian's Bizarre B&B	Cast Member	with Kian84 and Ji Ye-eun	

== Tours ==
- RunSeokjin Ep. Tour (2025)

== Accolades ==
=== Awards and nominations ===
Name of the award ceremony, year presented, award category, nominee(s) of the award, and the result of the nomination
Award ceremony	Year	Category	Nominee(s)/work(s)	Result	Ref.
Asia Artist Awards	2023	Popularity Award – Male Singer	Jin	Nominated	
Asia Artist Awards	2026	Popularity Award – Solo (Male)	Jin	Pending	
Asian Academy Creative Awards	2022	Best Theme Song or Title Theme; National Winner Korea	"Yours"	Won	
Asian Pop Music Awards (Note: Hosted by the Hong Kong Asia Pacific International Group and Sunway Records, the Asian Pop Music Awards bases its winners on the "Asian Pop Music Chart" launched in September 2019.)	2021	Best Film and Television Song (Overseas)	"Yours"	Nominated	
Asian Pop Music Awards	2025	Record of the Year	"Don't Say You Love Me"	Won	
Asian Pop Music Awards	2025	Top 20 Song of the Year	"Don't Say You Love Me"	Won	
Asia Star Entertainer Awards (Note: Established in 2024, the Asia Star Entertainer Awards is an awards ceremony hosted by South Korean media outlets Newsen and Star1 and organized by the ASEA Organizing Committee and Japan's Zozotown to honor K-pop artists who have achieved significant results on the global stage.)	2025	The Best OST	"Close to You"	Won	
Brand of the Year Awards (Note: the Brand of the Year Awards is an awards ceremony based on nationwide surveys hosted by the Korea Consumer Brand Committee and organized by the Korea Consumer Forum.)	2025	Best Male Variety Show Idol	Jin	Won	
Circle Chart Music Awards	2023	Album of the Year – 4th Quarter	The Astronaut	Nominated	
Circle Chart Music Awards	2023	Song of the Year – October	"The Astronaut"	Nominated	
Global Fan's Choice Awards	2025	Best K-Pop Performer	Jin	Won	
Golden Disc Awards	2026	Album Bonsang	Happy	Nominated	
Golden Disc Awards	2026	Most Popular Artist – Male	Jin	Won	
Hanteo Music Awards	2023	Global Artist (Africa)	Jin	Won	
iHeartRadio Music Awards	2026	K-pop Artist of the Year	Jin	Nominated	
Jupiter Music Awards	2025	Music Video of the Year	"I'll Be There"	Won	
Korea Grand Music Awards	2025	Best Music Video	"Don't Say You Love Me"	Won	
K-Star MVA (Note: A Japan-Korea joint project held by "IDOL CHAMP," a global support app for K-Pop idols, which awards the "Best Artist" who is most supported by global K-Pop fans and the "Next Star" who will carry the future of K-Pop.)	2023	Best Artist – Men	Jin	Won	
Mega Champ Awards	2025	Best Entertainer Award	Jin	Won	
MAMA Awards	2025	Album of the Year	"Happy"	Nominated	
MAMA Awards	2025	Artist of The Year	Jin	Nominated	
MAMA Awards	2025	Best Male Artist	Jin	Nominated	
MAMA Awards	2025	Fans' Choice Top 10	Jin	Won	
Melon Music Awards	2017	Best OST	"It's Definitely You"	Nominated	
Melon Music Awards	2025	Millions Top 10	Happy	Nominated	
Music Awards Japan	2026	International Song powered by Spotify	"Don't Say You Love Me"	Won	
SEC Awards (Note: The SEC Awards, formerly known as the Séries em Cena Awards, is a Brazilian award show that honors achievements in music, film, television, and internet culture in Brazil and globally.)	2025	International Male Artist of the Year	Jin	Won	
SEC Awards	2026	International Song of the Year	"Don't Say You Love Me"	Won	
SEC Awards	2026	Asian Artist of the Year	Jin	Won	
SEC Awards	2026	International Male Artist of the Year	Jin	Won	
Seoul Music Awards	2023	Bonsang Award	"The Astronaut"	Nominated	
Seoul Music Awards	2023	K-wave Award	Jin	Nominated	
Seoul Music Awards	2023	Popularity Award	Jin	Nominated	
Seoul Music Awards	2023	Fan Choice of the Year – April	Jin	Nominated	
The Fact Music Awards	2022	Fan N Star Choice Award – Individual	Jin	Won	
The Fact Music Awards	2022	Most Voted Artist – Individual	Jin	Nominated	
The Fact Music Awards	2025	Best Music: Summer	"Don't Say You Love Me"	Won	
The Fact Music Awards	2025	Fan N Star Choice <Solo>	Jin	Won	
The Fact Music Awards	2026	Fan N Star My Star Award - Male	Jin	Won	

=== Listicles ===
Name of publisher, year listed, name of listicle, and placement
Publisher	Year	Listicle	Placement	Ref.
Billboard	2024	K-Pop Artist 100	63th	
Billboard	2025	K-Pop Artist 100	20th	
Forbes Korea	2025	K-Idol of the Year 30	13th	
Forbes Korea	2025	Power Celebrity 40	26th	
Forbes Korea	2026	Power Celebrity 40	6th	
