= Epiphany (BTS song) =

Song by BTS

Song by BTS

from the album Love Yourself: Answer
- Released: August 9, 2018
- Recorded: 2018
- Studio: Carrot Express; Dogg Bounce
- Genre: Alternative rock
- Length: 4:00
- Label: Big Hit Entertainment
- Songwriters: ”hitman” bang; Slow Rabbit; Adora
- Producer: Slow Rabbit

Music video
- "'Epiphany' Comeback Trailer" on YouTube

"Epiphany" is a song by South Korean boy band BTS, sung as a solo by member Jin. It was released August 9, 2018, with the compilation album Love Yourself: Answer. It was written by ”hitman” bang, Slow Rabbit, and Adora, with Slow Rabbit being the sole producer.

== Background and release ==
The music video was released a week ahead of the pending album Love Yourself: Answer as a comeback trailer. Upon release, searches for the word increased 575%. It had over twenty million views in the first twenty-four hours.

== Promotion ==
The song was promoted at the 2018 KBS Song Festival on December 29, 2018.

== Music video ==
Billboard stated that the video tied in with the other music videos of the "Love Yourself" era thematically and narratively. It draws on the importance of self-love with lyrics such as, "I'm the one I should love in this world/Shining me, this precious soul of mine/I finally realize/So I love me/Not so perfect but so beautiful.”

Other critics pointed out the symbolism throughout the video, such as the calla lily and notebook, the sense of going backward and forward, through time and through different versions of one's self, guiding oneself to self-love. The video also switches from black-and-white to color, showing contrast and symbolizing acceptance as well as resignation. In line with the universe created through BTS's previous music videos and Love Yourself series, the video implies that member Jin, who moves back and forth through time to different alternate universes to try and save his friends, has finally realized that the answer to what he is searching for lies within himself.

The trailer was directed by Yong-seok Choi of Lumpens. The assistant directors were Guzza, Park Hyejeong, and Jeong Minje of Lumpens. Other key personnel were Kim Daehong who was the robot arm operator, Shin Seunghoon the gaffer, Song Sukki the technical director, and Hong Yeongjun who was the key scenic artist. Additionally, Kim Bona and Park Jinsil from MU:E were the art directors.

== Composition ==
Musically, the song has been described as alternative rock, with blends soft acoustic guitar and wavy electric riffs. South China Morning Post, however, stated it is a "thought provoking ballad".

"Epiphany" is 3:48 minutes long and in the key of F major, with a piano leading it. Jin's vocal range span from the note of D3 to F5. It is 136 beats per minute.

== Reception ==
Rolling Stone India stated, "The lyrics are a literal epiphany about the fact that to love others, you first need to master the process of being able to love and accept yourself," with Jin's vocals being "dreamy and particularly striking on the background harmonies and adlibs". Clash called the song "uplifting and revelatory", encompassing the entire album's theme of self love.

In the United States, the song came in at number nineteen on the Digital Song Sales chart, selling more than 10,000 copies. On the Canadian Digital Song Sales chart, the song peaked at number 28.

== Credits and personnel ==
The song's credits are adapted from the CD liner notes of Love Yourself: Answer.

- Kim Seokjin - Vocalist
- Slow Rabbit - Producer, Keyboard, Synthesizer, Vocal Arrangement, Digital Editing, Recording Engineer @ Carrot Express
- "hitman" bang - Producer
- Adora - Producer, Chorus
- JUNE - Chorus
- Lee Shinseong - Chorus
- Sam Klempner - Chorus
- Lee Taewook - Guitar
- Pdogg - Recording Engineer @ Dogg Bounce
- Bob Horn - Mix Engineer

== Charts ==
Chart (2018–20)	Peak position
Finland Digital Song Sales (Billboard)	8
French Downloaded Singles (SNEP)	61
Hungary (Single Top 40)	5
South Korea (Gaon)	30
South Korea (K-pop Hot 100)	5
Scottish Singles Sales (Official Charts)	60
UK Downloaded Singles (OCC)	53
US World Digital Songs (Billboard)	4
