= The Astronaut (song) =

- Digital cover

Single by Jin
- Language: Korean; English
- Released: October 28, 2022
- Recorded: 2022
- Genre: Pop rock
- Length: 4:42
- Label: Big Hit Music
- Songwriters: Guy Berryman; Jonny Buckland; Will Champion; Chris Martin; Jin; Kyrre Gørvell-Dahll (Note: Kygo is credited under his real name as a co-writer, but under his stagename as producer.); Joan La Barbara; Jóhann Jóhannsson; Moses Martin
- Producers: Kygo; Bill Rahko

Jin singles chronology
"Super Tuna" (2021)	"The Astronaut" (2022)	"I'll Be There" (2024)

Music video
- "The Astronaut" on YouTube

"The Astronaut" is a song by South Korean singer Jin of BTS released on October 28, 2022, as his debut solo single. The song was co-written by Jin; British rock band Coldplay, who previously collaborated with BTS on "My Universe"; Norwegian DJ Kygo, who produced the track with Bill Rahko; and Chris Martin's son Moses Martin. The song is about Jin's affection for and relationship with his fans. It explores themes of connection and love through the use of a recurring cosmic motif favored by both the band and singer, as evidenced in other songs they have written.

Described as "a gift to fans", it was released ahead of Jin's enlistment, which occurred shortly afterwards. The single is available digitally and on CD format. An accompanying music video portrays the singer as an alien astronaut who accidentally crash-lands on Earth and must eventually choose between staying with his found family or returning to his home planet.

== Background and release ==
On October 15, 2022, during BTS' Yet to Come in Busan free concert, Jin revealed that he would be the next band member after J-Hope, to release an official solo work. Addressing the audience, he said "It's not a huge album or anything, it's just a single. I was able to work together with someone that I'd always really liked, so I'll be releasing a new song." The following day, Big Hit Music posted a notice confirming BTS would be moving ahead with plans to fulfill their mandatory military service and that Jin would be the first member to enlist following the completion of promotions for his solo release. Several articles subsequently published by Korean news media reported that the song was gifted to Jin by Coldplay and would be released at the end of the month, despite Big Hit not having provided any details about the single at the time. Initial statements from the label in response to all the speculation neither confirmed nor denied the reports, with the company only saying that details would be provided at a later date—it eventually confirmed the month-end date to Newsen and YTN.

Big Hit officially announced the single via Weverse on October 18, and said it is meant to be a "gift" to Jin's fans, ARMY. A promotion schedule outlining the rollout for the single, titled "The Astronaut", was published later that same day. Image previews of the physical single's contents, posted by the label shortly before the preorder period began, appeared to "leak" credited personnel on the track, including Max Martin, Kygo, Chris Martin, Moses Martin, and James Keys. The single's official poster, shared the next day, confirmed that the song was a collaboration between Jin and Coldplay—both artists were listed as co-writers on the graphic. The singer had developed a close friendship with the band following their working together on the "My Universe" single, and the song was borne from subsequent discussions between both artists about the former "having to leave for a while" due to his enlistment, and him missing his bandmates and fans during that time.

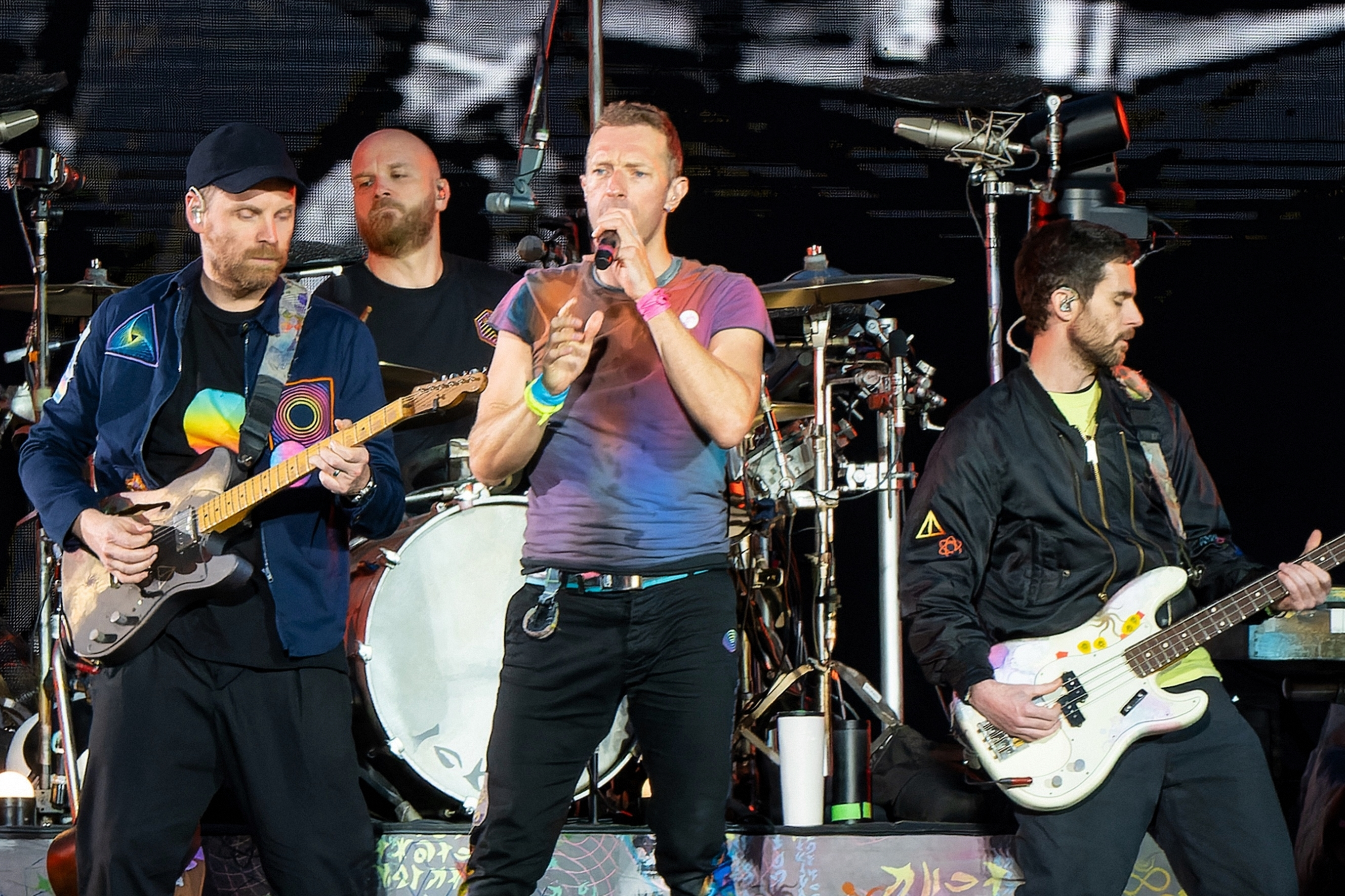
British rock band Coldplay co-wrote the song and performed its instrumentals.

The first of three sets of concept photos was released on October 23. Titled "Outlander", the images showed Jin "standing amid green shrubbery" surrounded by planet-shaped props while "holding a large Jupiter-like sphere" then "posing against a starry blue background". The second set of concept photos—titled "Lunar Eclipse"—was posted the next day and featured Jin styled with his hair brushed back, in all black, wearing a leather jacket and "classic white Converse hi-tops", which Uproxx described as "giv[ing] off a simple, modern look to your ordinary greaser." A music video teaser followed on October 26.

Jin also designed an animated astronaut character called Wootteo (우떠) and an accompanying line of Wootteo-themed merchandise in promotion of the single. An official Instagram account created for the character provided updates throughout the promotion period, and shared behind-the-scenes photos and short clips from preparations for the single and music video.

=== Format ===
"The Astronaut" is available digitally and as a CD single. Two versions of the CD (Note: purple (Version 01), green (Version 02)) were released and include a photobook, lyric card, postcard, stickers, a photo card, and a poster. A Target-exclusive edition was also released. The pre-order period for the CD opened on October 19, 2022.

== Music and lyrics ==
"The Astronaut" is a pop rock song, co-written by Coldplay, Jin and Kygo, who co-produced the single with Bill Rahko. The song features acoustic guitar and "gradually escalating synth sounds" in its instrumentation. A video tweet posted by Coldplay on October 27, 2022, revealed a single lyric line from the song. The clip showed an audio file, labelled with the single's title, containing "an isolated backing track" of Chris Martin's voice which is heard singing "When I'm with you, there is no one else / I get heaven to myself when I'm with you." Previously described as expressing Jin's affection for his fans, the song's lyrics "[pay] tribute to a loved one – or a group of them – by casting its gaze skyward and rocketing into outer space". Echoing sentiments found in "My Universe" and his 2020 solo song "Moon", (Note: from BTS' fourth studio album Map of the Soul: 7) which "fram[ed the singer] as the titular satellite" and his fans as the Earth, Jin delivers yet another "ardent declaration while imagining himself floating above our planet", in a gentle voice "glittering with gratitude" as he sings the previously teased "When I'm with you" line in the song's chorus. Similar to the overarching cosmic metaphor Coldplay has used throughout their career, seen first in "Yellow" and realized in full with Music of the Spheres (2021), Jin invokes "the vastness of the great beyond to encapsulate the galactic scale of his feelings". As the song progresses, the "earnest sincerity" in his dedications increases as the singer extols "the strength of his relationship" in lines such as "You and me / Like a star that doesn't shatter", "Just as the Milky Way shines upon the darkest roads / You were shining towards me", and "The only light found in the darkness / On my path to you".

== Critical reception ==
Professional ratings
Review scores
Source	Rating
NME	4/5 stars

"The Astronaut" was met with a generally positive reception from critics who praised the song's lyricism and Jin's vocal performance. In her 4-star review for NME, music journalist Rhian Daly described the song as "a starry-eyed gem that sparkles with love" and "illuminate[s] yet more kinship between Coldplay and Jin, and their way of thinking about love and those important to them", with additional compliments for the "wide-eyed romanticism" of its lyrics. She pinpointed the "slightly deeper register" used by Jin on the track as "a move that adds a fresh, velvety texture to his intonation without compromising on the emotion always palpable in his vocals" and felt that the song showcased "the BTS star at his enchanting best" vocally. Daly did note, however, that it felt "more distinctively like a Coldplay song than it necessarily does a Jin song...[as] his individual artistic identity still isn't given much room to manifest", but concluded that the singer "has plenty of years ahead of him to define that for himself." In contrast to Daly, MTV's Lai Frances felt that "Jin's artistic path comes full circle", opining that the song "can be seen as the ultimate passion project". She called it "a love letter to Army", and from a more personal standpoint, "a sonic metaphor for [Jin's] own story, as he blasts into an uncharted new chapter of his life." Writing for Billboard, Jeff Benjamin felt that Coldplay's "stadium-sized rock sound" was the "perfect bed for Jin's steady, soothing vocals" and noted that the singer, known for bringing "raw emotions to his ballads" such as "Awake" and "Epiphany", was "able to capture the same sentimental approach to a more upbeat, dynamic pop-rock song." Senior editor at The Atlantic Lenika Cruz said that the song "conjures both bittersweet nostalgia and warm optimism. When the shimmering guitars and Jin's one-of-a-kind, powerhouse vocals wash over me, I feel a strange sense of cosmic reassurance".

== Commercial performance ==
According to Hanteo, (Note: The Hanteo Chart is one of two main charts in South Korea, the other being the Circle Chart, that tracks physical and digital sales.) over 700,000 copies of "The Astronaut"'s physical single were sold in South Korea on its release day, earning the highest first day sales for a single by a soloist in Hanteo chart history and surpassing previous record-holder Lalisa, which sold over 330,000 copies on its opening day. The single went on to sell 770,126 cumulative copies in its first seven days of availability, recording the third-highest first week sales of any solo release in Hanteo chart history. With this, Jin became the third male soloist to surpass 700,000 debut/single day sales, after Lim Young-woong—his debut studio album Im Hero (2022) sold over 940,000 copies on its first day—and Baekhyun—his fourth extended play Bambi (2021) sold over 760,000 copies on its first day, and the third soloist overall to surpass the 750,000 sales mark, also after Lim and Baekhyun. The physical single debuted at number one on the week 44 issue of the Circle Album Chart, for the period dated October 23–29, 2022. The digital single debuted on the corresponding issues of the Digital Chart and component Download Chart at numbers 52 and 2 respectively. It entered the component Streaming Chart the following week, at number 82, and peaked on the Digital and Download charts at numbers 40 and 1 respectively. The physical single repeaked atop the Album Chart in its third week.

In Japan, "The Astronaut" debuted at number four on the Oricon Daily Digital Singles chart, and peaked at number two the following day, with 3,620 downloads. It entered the subsequent weekly chart issue dated November 7 at number eight, with 11,774 cumulative downloads for the period October 24–30, 2022. The single also entered on the Billboard Japan Hot 100 at number 43, supported by only digital sales and streaming as the physical was not yet available. It was the eighth best-selling song of the week on the component Download chart, earning Jin his second entry on the Artist 100 at number 35. Following the physical single's release in the country, "The Astronaut" debuted atop Oricon's Daily Singles Chart for November 5 with 104,018 copies sold, and on the subsequent Weekly chart issue (for the period dated October 31–November 6) at number two.

"The Astronaut" earned Jin his first solo entry on the US Billboard Hot 100, debuting at number 51 on the chart issue dated November 12, 2022, with 4.9 million domestic streams and 44,000 downloads sold in its first tracking week. It topped the corresponding issue of the Digital Song Sales chart, for the period dated October 28–November 3, 2022, and became his third number-one on the World Digital Song Sales chart. With this, Jin rose to number one on the Emerging Artists chart for the first time, surpassing his previous peak of number four. He is the fifth member of BTS to rank as a soloist on the Hot 100. The single also debuted at number 10 on the Billboard Global 200, with 48.3 million streams and 62,000 sales worldwide. Of those figures, 43.5 million streams and 43,000 sales came from territories outside the United States, earning the single a place on the Global Excl. US chart at number six. Jin is the third member of BTS to earn a solo top-10 entry on both Global charts and the first to do so as a lead artist.

== Music video ==
A 2-minute-long Logo Trailer was released on YouTube the day of the single's official announcement. The clip features a tiny astronaut exiting the hatch of an A-shaped space station high in orbit above the Earth. He slowly drifts into the "dark expanse of space" then travels "through a meteor shower, past moons and planets, satellites and asteroid fields"—at one point a dog resembling Jin's late pet Jjangu is also seen on a meteoroid—at increasing velocities, before coming upon an "otherworldly source of light" which then completely envelops him in a bright purple haze. A stylized logo of the song's title appears onscreen and the clip ends.

Per the single's promotion schedule, a music video teaser was released on October 26, 2022. The 38-second-long short clip shows Jin staring off into the distance while sitting atop a hill overlooking a barren landscape. A helmet is seen on the ground next to him. The camera angle changes to reveal a giant, crashed flying saucer burning on the plane before him. The full-length music video, filmed in the United States, premiered on YouTube on October 28.

=== Synopsis ===
The visual opens with the same footage from the teaser then switches to Jin in the present-day, doing a crossword puzzle in his bedroom—the singer portrays an alien astronaut living on Earth after accidentally crash-landing there. He notices a bright beam of light in the sky from his window—it is calling him back to his planet of origin—dons his helmet (previously seen in the teaser) and leaves his house, intending to journey to the site and return to his planet. Outside, he is greeted by a young girl he befriended while on Earth and places his helmet on her head as a farewell. The rest of the video depicts Jin's journey to the crash site. He runs part of the way; walks through a crowded street, passing a space suit on the sidewalk at one point; then rides a bicycle the rest of the way. A memory of him helping his friend learn to ride a bike is seen as a flashback. Upon arriving at the crash site, Jin is transported to a purple galaxy. Scenes of him singing the song are interspersed with flashbacks of other "moments of wonder and joy" he experienced with his friend during his time on Earth. Ultimately deciding to stay "where his loved ones and precious things exist", Jin turns his back on the spaceship, which leaves without him, and eventually hitchhikes a ride on the tray of a truck. He is seen smiling contentedly as the truck drives away. A shot of him holding up a drawing titled "Home"—as he has found his "true home"—is intercut with the truck scene. The video ends with Jin completing the crossword in his bedroom. As he fills in the word "family", the sound of a bicycle bell is heard ringing outside.

Chris Martin makes a brief cameo in one scene, as a television newscaster who announces the sighting of the light beam.

== Accolades ==
"The Astronaut" won a first place trophy on the November 10, 2022, episode of M Countdown. It was also nominated for the weekly Melon Popularity Award throughout that month, achieving two consecutive wins on November 14 and 21. It was later nominated in the Global Digital Music – October and Physical Album – 4th Quarter categories at the 12th Circle Chart Music Awards, and the Best Music (Winter) category at the 2023 Fact Music Awards.

Rolling Stone included the track on its "100 Best songs of 2022" list at number 68, with Kristine Kwak writing that "The lyrics capture how BTS make their fans feel: 'When I'm with you/There's no one else/I get heaven to myself.' Fans will surely be listening to Jin's strong vocals and heartfelt message in 'The Astronaut' for years to come", while Dazed ranked it as the 26th best K-pop track of 2022, with Taylor Glasby calling it "the perfect fit for [Jin] as a man and artist; an airy dreaminess grounded by a wholesome earthiness". Billboard named it one of the "25 Best K-Pop Songs of 2022", at number 14. French news magazine Paris Match ranked it fourth on the outlet's year-end list of the 10 best K-pop releases from 2022. Music writer Séraphine Roger commented that Jin thrives on heartbreaking ballads and described "The Astronaut" as nostalgic and delicate.

== Live performances ==
Jin appeared as a special guest during Coldplay's concert at the Estadio River Plate Stadium in Buenos Aires, Argentina, held the same day as the single's release, and performed the song live for the first time together with the band. The concert was broadcast live to over 3,500 theatres worldwide in more than 70 countries as part of a two-night-only live-event cinema special during the Latin America leg of the band's Music of the Spheres World Tour. The performance video, directed by Paul Dugdale, was uploaded to YouTube by Big Hit afterwards. Rolling Stone shared exclusive behind-the-scenes photos of Jin rehearsing with the band on October 27, as well as muted video footage of him singing while Chris Martin played along on guitar.

Coldplay performed an all-English version of "The Astronaut" during their appearance on the February 4, 2023, episode of Saturday Night Live. Set against a "starry background and colorful shooting lights", the band was joined onstage by Jacob Collier; vocal ensemble the Jason Max Ferdinand Singers, who held glowing orbs in their hands; and performers wearing "colourful helmets" and alien masks, the latter of whom—actress Natasha Ofili—provided an ASL-interpretation of the song.

== Personnel ==
- Guy Berryman – songwriting, bass
- Jonny Buckland – songwriting, guitar
- Will Champion – songwriting, drums, percussion
- Serban Ghenea – mixing
- Daniel Green – production, keyboard, programming, engineering
- Oscar Holter – production, keyboard, programming
- Michael Ilbert – production, engineering
- Jin – songwriting, lead vocals
- Jóhann Jóhannsson – songwriting
- James Keys – background vocals
- Kygo – production, songwriting, programming
- Joan La Barbara – songwriting
- Chris Martin – songwriting, keyboard, guitar, background vocals
- Max Martin – production, keyboard
- Moses Martin – songwriting, background vocals
- Pdogg – vocal arrangement, engineering
- Bill Rahko – production, keyboard, programming

== Charts ==
=== Weekly charts ===
Weekly chart performance
Chart (2022)	Peak position
Australia (ARIA)	69
Canada (Canadian Hot 100)	58
Croatian International Albums (HDU)	7
France (SNEP)	106
Global 200 (Billboard)	10
Greece International (IFPI)	56
Hong Kong (Billboard)	22
Hungary (Single Top 40)	1
India International Singles (IMI)	5
Indonesia (Billboard)	4
Ireland (IRMA)	96
Japan (Japan Hot 100)	4
Japan (Oricon)	2
Japan Combined Singles (Oricon)	2
Lithuania (AGATA)	66
Malaysia (Billboard)	8
New Zealand Hot Singles (RMNZ)	5
Philippines (Billboard)	10
Portuguese Albums (AFP)	31
Singapore (RIAS)	9
South Korea (Circle)	40
South Korean Albums (Circle)	1
UK Singles (Official Charts)	61
US Billboard Hot 100	51
US World Digital Song Sales (Billboard)	1
Vietnam (Vietnam Hot 100)	3

=== Monthly charts ===
Monthly chart performance
Chart (2022)	Peak position
Japan (Oricon)	5
South Korea (Circle)	63
South Korean Albums (Circle)	2

=== Year-end charts ===
Year-end chart performance
Chart (2022)	Position
Hungary (Single Top 40)	9
Japan (Oricon)	45
Japan Top Singles Sales (Billboard Japan)	49
South Korean Albums (Circle)	17
South Korea Download (Circle)	60
US Digital Song Sales (Billboard)	58

== Certifications and sales ==
Certifications and sales
Region	Certification	Certified units/sales
Japan (RIAJ)	Gold	171,330 (Note: Japanese physical and digital sales for "The Astronaut" as of November 2022.)
South Korea (KMCA)	Million	1,000,000^{^}
United States	—	44,000 (Note: American first-week digital sales for "The Astronaut" in October 2022.)
^{^} Shipments figures based on certification alone.

== Release history ==
Release dates and formats
Region	Date	Format(s)	Label	Ref.
South Korea	October 28, 2022	CD; Digital download; streaming	Big Hit Music	
Various	October 28, 2022	CD; Digital download; streaming	Big Hit Music	
Japan	November 6, 2022	CD	Big Hit Music	
Europe	December 2, 2022	CD	Big Hit Music	
United States	December 2, 2022	CD	Big Hit Music	
