= Don't Say You Love Me (Jin song) =

Single by Jin

from the EP Echo
- Released: May 16, 2025
- Genre: Pop
- Length: 3:00
- Label: Big Hit
- Songwriters: Nathan Fertig; Wyatt Sanders
- Producers: Tiggs; Sanders

Jin singles chronology
"Close to You" (2025)	"Don't Say You Love Me" (2025)

Music video
- "Don't Say You Love Me" on YouTube

"Don't Say You Love Me" is a song by South Korean singer Jin, released on May 16, 2025 as the lead single from his second EP Echo (2025). It was written and produced by Tiggs and Wyatt Sanders.

== Background ==
Jin selected the song as the lead single because he felt it was "pleasant to listen to" and "the easiest on the ears" among the tracks from Echo.

== Lyrics and composition ==
The song is about a couple struggling to break up despite their failing relationship, with lyrics depicting their inner conflicts, sadness and ambivalence. In the first verse, Jin revolves around the difficulty for him to move on. He asks his ex to help him with letting go during the chorus: "Don't tell me that you're gonna miss me / Just tell me that you wanna kill me".

== Critical reception ==
Maria Letícia L. Gomes of Clash described the song as "sonically soft and emotionally unresolved", adding that "With its restrained structure and light melody, it hovers around the pain of a relationship that won't cleanly end. Jin's calm delivery aligns with the theme, holding back rather than spilling over. The simplicity serves the song, even though it would risk fading into a cliche pop formula if not for the emotion in his phrasing, which changes the track for the better." Nmesoma Okechukwu of Euphoria remarked "if there's a song that I think has a moderate staying power, it's Jin's 'Don't Say You Love Me.' He's obviously mastered his voice, because he could oh so swiftly shift through notes that it feels like your ears are on holiday."

== Award & Nominations ==
Name of the award ceremony, year presented, award category, nominee(s) of the award, and the result of the nomination
Award ceremony	Year	Category	Result	Ref.
Asian Pop Music Awards (Note: Hosted by the Hong Kong Asia Pacific International Group and Sunway Records, the Asian Pop Music Awards bases its winners on the "Asian Pop Music Chart" launched in September 2019.)	2025	Record of the Year	Won	
Asian Pop Music Awards	2025	Top 20 Song of The Year	Won	
Korea Grand Music Awards	2025	Best Music Video	Won	
Music Awards Japan	2026	International Song powered by Spotify	Won	
SEC Awards (Note: The SEC Awards, formerly known as the Séries em Cena Awards, is a Brazilian award show that honors achievements in music, film, television, and internet culture in Brazil and globally.)	2026	International Song of the Year	Won	
The Fact Music Awards	2025	Best Music: Summer	Won	

== Music video ==
The music video was released alongside the single. Directed by Yongseok Choi, it was filmed in Singapore in partnership with the Singapore Tourism Board. The video stars South Korean actress Shin Se-kyung and was the first time that Jin worked with an actor. It opens with Jin watching Shin drive away. As he visits tourist attractions (including the Goldhill Plaza, Marina Bay, National Gallery Singapore, Gardens by the Bay, Anderson Bridge and Singapore Flyer), Jin has visions of Shin in these places and is haunted by memories of their relationship. In the finale, Jin chases her departing car and eventually reunites with Shin.

== Live performances ==
Jin performed the song on The Tonight Show Starring Jimmy Fallon on May 21, 2025.

== Track listing ==
- CD single
1. "Don't Say You Love Me" – 3:00
- CD single – instrumental
1. "Don't Say You Love Me" – 3:00
2. "Don't Say You Love Me" (instrumental) – 3:00
- Digital download and streaming – remixes
1. "Don't Say You Love Me" – 3:00
2. "Don't Say You Love Me" (instrumental) – 3:00
3. "Don't Say You Love Me" (band version) – 3:02
4. "Don't Say You Love Me" (lofi remix) – 2:24
5. "Don't Say You Love Me" (disco remix) – 3:12
6. "Don't Say You Love Me" (synthwave remix) – 2:35
7. "Don't Say You Love Me" (90s pop remix) – 3:10
8. "Don't Say You Love Me" (future pop remix) – 2:26

== Charts ==
=== Weekly charts ===
Weekly chart performance
Chart (2025–2026)	Peak position
Argentina Hot 100 (Billboard)	60
Bolivia (Billboard)	4
Brazil Hot 100 (Billboard)	40
Canada Hot 100 (Billboard)	87
Chile Anglo Airplay (Monitor Latino)	9
Colombia (Colombia Hot 100)	59
Dominican Republic Anglo Airplay (Monitor Latino)	6
Ecuador Anglo Airplay (Monitor Latino)	2
El Salvador Anglo Airplay (Monitor Latino)	3
Global 200 (Billboard)	6
Guatemala Anglo Airplay (Monitor Latino)	6
Hong Kong (Billboard)	8
India International (IMI)	1
Indonesia (Billboard)	5
Indonesia (IFPI)	14
Japan Hot 100 (Billboard)	28
Japan Combined Singles (Oricon)	43
Lithuania (AGATA)	4
Malaysia (IFPI)	5
Malaysia International (RIM)	3
Mexico Anglo Airplay (Monitor Latino)	18
Middle East and North Africa (IFPI)	3
New Zealand Hot Singles (RMNZ)	5
Panama Anglo Airplay (Monitor Latino)	11
Panama Streaming (PRODUCE)	47
Peru (Billboard)	5
Philippines Hot 100 (Billboard Philippines)	9
Russia Airplay (TopHit)	87
Russia Streaming (TopHit)	84
Singapore (RIAS)	1
South Korea (Circle)	89
Taiwan (Billboard)	9
Thailand (IFPI)	8
United Arab Emirates (IFPI)	1
UK Singles (Official Charts)	58
US Billboard Hot 100	90
Vietnam (IFPI)	7
Vietnam (Vietnam Hot 100)	5

=== Monthly charts ===
Monthly chart performance
Chart (2025–2026)	Peak position
Lithuania Airplay (TopHit)	79
Panama Streaming (PRODUCE)	55
South Korea (Circle)	180

=== Year-end charts ===
Year-end chart performance
Chart (2025)	Position
Argentina Anglo Airplay (Monitor Latino)	36
Global 200 (Billboard)	151
Philippines (Philippines Hot 100)	73

== Release history ==
"Don't Say You Love Me" release history
Region	Date	Format	Version	Label	Ref.
Various	May 16, 2025	CD single; digital download; streaming	Original	Big Hit	
Various	May 16, 2025	CD single	Original; instrumental	Big Hit	
Various	May 20, 2025	Digital download; streaming	Remixes	Big Hit	
Italy	June 5, 2025	Radio airplay	Original	EMI	
