= The Korea Times (America) =

American newspaper

- Type: Monday-Saturday newspaper
- Format: Broadsheet
- Publisher: Jae Min Chang
- Founded: June 9, 1969; 57 years ago
- Language: Korean
- Headquarters: 3731 Wilshire Blvd. 10th Floor; Los Angeles, California 90010; U.S.
- Sister newspapers: Hankook Ilbo
- Website: www.koreatimes.com

The Korea Times (Korean: 미주한국일보; lit. 'American Korea Times') is a Korean-language newspaper published in the Americas.

The newspaper is headquartered in Los Angeles, California, United States. It has branch offices in various cities in the United States, as well as in Canada and Argentina.

== History ==
Its third headquarters on Vermont Avenue. (1985)

The newspaper was founded on June 9, 1969 as an extension of the South Korea-based Hankook Ilbo. Around this time, South Korean immigration to the United States was increasing in the wake of the Immigration and Nationality Act of 1965, and the Jang family saw an opportunity in establishing a newspaper there for the growing Korean community.

The original South Korean Hankook Ilbo was founded by journalist Jang Gi-yeong. Jang had five sons, all of whom became journalists who became involved with either the Hankook Ilbo or its affiliates, or who founded their own newspapers. Second son Jang Jae-gu (장재구) served as the founding president of the LA-based paper. In 1970, they began publishing a monthly magazine called American News (미국 소식). In 1979, they adopted computerized typesetting.

The newspaper established new branch offices around North America over the following years. In 1970, it established an office in Washington on May 1 and one in San Francisco on May 14. In 1971, it established one in Chicago on March 3, and one in Toronto, Canada on September 1. His expansion efforts have since been evaluated as ambitious. Under his leadership, the newspaper developed the largest circulation of all newspapers published for the Korean diaspora. It maintained a status of prominence from its founding and into the 2000s. It established partnerships with various American newspapers, including the Los Angeles Times and The Washington Post. It moved headquarters in 1997 to Hancock Park. That year, it also began publishing its news online.

Around the time of the 1997 Asian financial crisis, the Jang family's various companies encountered financial difficulties, and family relationships became visibly strained, with publicized scandals.

The newspaper suffered a series of setbacks in the U.S. market amid competition from the JoongAng Ilbo in 1990s, which was backed by the Samsung Group.

In 2010, it established a Korea Times-Hankook Ilbo Endowed Chair in Korean American Studies position at the University of California, Los Angeles. It has also hosted events on Korean culture. It moved headquarters again in 2016 on Wilshire Boulevard in the Los Angeles Koreatown.
