= Blood Sweat & Tears (song) =

2016 single by BTS

- Japanese single cover

Single by BTS

from the album Wings
- B-side: "Not Today"
- Released: October 10, 2016
- Genre: Moombahton; trap; tropical house
- Length: 3:37
- Label: Big Hit; Universal Japan
- Songwriters: Pdogg; RM; Suga; J-Hope; "Hitman" Bang; Kim Do-hoon
- Producer: Pdogg

BTS singles chronology
"Save Me" (2016)	"Blood Sweat & Tears" (2016)	"Spring Day" (2017)

BTS Japanese singles chronology
"Run" (2016)	"Chi, Ase, Namida" (2017)	"Mic Drop" / "DNA" / "Crystal Snow" (2017)

Music videos
- "Blood Sweat & Tears" on YouTube
- "Blood Sweat & Tears" (Japanese version) on YouTube

"Blood Sweat & Tears" (Korean: 피 땀 눈물; RR: Pi ttam nunmul; Japanese: 血、汗、涙; Hepburn: Chi, ase, namida) is a song recorded in two languages (Korean and Japanese) by South Korean boy band BTS. It was written by "Hitman" Bang, Kim Do-hoon, RM, Suga, J-Hope, and Pdogg, with the latter of the six solely handling production. The Korean version was released on October 10, 2016, as the lead single from the band's second studio album, Wings (2016), by Big Hit Entertainment. The Japanese version of the song was released on May 10, 2017, through Universal Music Japan, as a single album that included the B-side tracks "Not Today" and "Spring Day", both also in Japanese. It is a moombahton, trap, and tropical house song with influences of dancehall and reggaeton. The song's lyrics address the pain of addictive love.

The song received generally positive reviews from music critics, who were favourable towards its production, the refreshing sound, and BTS' vocal delivery. It was also likened to the musical styles of Major Lazer and Justin Bieber. It was nominated for the Song of the Year at the 2016 Mnet Asian Music Awards and appeared on the decade-end lists of the best K-pop songs by Billboard and GQ. Commercially, the Korean version of the song debuted at number one on South Korea's Gaon Digital Chart, becoming the band's first number one on the chart. As of May 2019, the song has sold over 2.5 million copies in South Korea. The Japanese version peaked at number one on the Oricon Singles Chart, becoming the 22nd best-selling single of 2017 in Japan. It received a platinum certification from the Recording Industry Association of Japan (RIAJ) for shipments of 250,000 copies in the country.

Two music videos were filmed for "Blood Sweat & Tears", one for the Korean version and another for the Japanese version; the first video was directed by YongSeok Choi and premiered via Big Hit's YouTube channel on October 10, 2016. Inspired by Hermann Hesse's coming of age novel, Demian (1919), the symbolism-heavy video depicts BTS exploring a museum and performing choreography. The video was awarded the Best Music Video at the 2017 Seoul Music Awards. The second video, featuring psychedelic and neon colours, was uploaded to Universal Japan's YouTube channel on May 10, 2017. BTS promoted the song with televised live performances on various South Korean music programs, including M! Countdown, Music Bank, and Inkigayo. It was also included on the set list of their second worldwide concert tour, The Wings Tour (2017).

== Background and release ==
Following the conclusion of their three-part narrative "Youth" series, which presented the theme of the beauty of youth and its uncertainties, BTS announced the release of their second Korean-language studio album Wings in 2016. "Blood Sweat & Tears" was confirmed to be included on Wings when the band shared the track-listing of the album. On October 7, 2016, the song was announced as the lead single from the album. The song was written by "Hitman" Bang, Kim Do-hoon, RM, Suga, J-Hope, and its producer Pdogg. The track was engineered by the producer, while mixing was handled by James F. Reynolds at Schmuzik Studios.

"Blood Sweat & Tears" was released for digital download and streaming by Big Hit Entertainment on October 10, 2016, as the lead single from Wings. A Japanese version of the song was recorded, and issued digitally for purchase on May 10, 2017 by Universal Music Japan as the band's seventh Japanese-language single album, together with the Japanese versions of previously released 2017 Korean singles, "Spring Day" and "Not Today". The single album was also released as a four-version CD single in Japan on the same day, with a regular edition and three different limited editions; A, B and C. All four editions contain Japanese versions of "Blood, Sweat & Tears" as the A-side and "Not Today" as B-side track, while the Japanese version of "Spring Day" is included exclusively on the regular edition. In addition, edition A includes a DVD that contains the music videos for both the Korean and Japanese versions of "Blood, Sweat & Tears". Edition B also comes with a DVD, which contains behind the scenes footage of the music video for the Japanese version of the song and the making of the album jacket photos, while C contains a 36-page photobook. The lyrics for the Japanese version were written by KM-MARKIT. It was subsequently included as the third track on BTS' third Japanese-language studio album Face Yourself (2018).

== Music and lyrics ==
"Blood Sweat & Tears"
A 21-second sample of the chorus of "Blood Sweat & Tears", in which the band use "feathery" and "breathy" vocals, leading to a smoky, electronic-dance-driven breakdown that was compared to the musical styles of Major Lazer and Justin Bieber. The lyrics address the pain of addictive love.

As opposed to BTS' signature hip hop sound, "Blood Sweat & Tears" was described as a hybrid of moombahton, trap, and tropical house. The song takes influence from dancehall and reggaeton. It is composed in the key of C minor, with a moderate tempo of 93 beats per minute, and runs for 3:37. Instrumentally, the song relies on keyboards, synthesizer, and Caribbean drums. The song employs a "layered" production that consists of "spacey chill-house beats," "airy synths," "echoing sirens" and "rhythmic claps." A reviewer from The Singles Jukebox noted similarities in the song's composition to the styles of Norwegian production duo Stargate.

The verses are driven by "pounding beats," and use an emotional and melancholic delivery. The vocal approaches are characterized by gentle, cascading chimes, as well as "sentimental crooning." The song features "feathery coos," "breathy" falsettos, "chopped vocal" hooks and at-times, "undulating" raps from the band. The chorus is "circuitous," in which they chant "My blood, sweat and tears, my last dance, take it all away." It leads to a smoky, electronic-dance-driven breakdown, which was compared to the "emotionally tinged" works of Major Lazer and Justin Bieber.

Speaking about the concept and the meaning of the song at a press conference, RM stated: "The harder a temptation is to resist, the more you think about it and vacillate. That uncertainty is part of the process of growing. 'Blood Sweat & Tears' is a song that shows how one thinks, chooses, and grows." Suga added that "the song conveys an optimistic determination to use our wings to go far, even if we encounter temptations in life." Lyrically, the song talks about the pain of addictive love. The lyrics address the themes of "temptation" and "carnal willingness" to sacrifice everything, through lines like: "Kiss me, I don't care if it hurts/ Hurry up and choke me/ So I can't get hurt any more." An editor from Billboard wrote that the song "embraces the sense of desperation that the septet had featured on previous singles, like 'I Need U' and 'Save Me'."

== Critical reception ==
"Blood Sweat & Tears" was met with generally positive reviews from music critics. Jeff Benjamin of Fuse praised the track's sound and the band's vocal delivery, writing that the "wholly accessible dance single" is "perfect for today's pop soundscape." Benjamin also wrote an article for Billboard where he cited it as BTS' best song and said, "the raps, the vocal deliveries and the visuals all feel specific and important to their developing story, while still being wholly accessible to audiences around the globe [...] and only continue to push their art deeper into the global music scene." Tamar Herman, in a separate Billboard review, labelled the song as "game-changing" and called it "sonically" complex. She praised the "ethereal vocals" and "high notes," adding that the song "maintains BTS' bombastic style even while shifting away from hip-hop and toward a more mainstream, Major Lazer-esque sound." In The Malaysia Star, Chester Chin commended the song for its "infectious EDM sounds." Jacques Peterson of Idolator wrote that the track "wouldn't sound out of place on Justin Bieber's Purpose." Hyun-su Yim from The Korea Herald praised the song for its "minimalist" chorus and "synth-based" production.

Reviewing for Vulture, T.K. Park and Youngdae Kim felt that the song evolved the band's sound and musical direction in a way "that represents a turning point in [BTS'] career." They elaborated writing: "Despite being influenced by dancehall, reggaeton, and moombahton, the number eschews the partylike atmosphere of its influences, electing instead for a baroque mysticism." Craig Jenkins, also of Vulture, deemed the track as "dark and existential." Taylor Glasby of Dazed lauded the song's production and the band's vocal delivery, writing that "BTS are able to marry the lyrics' intimate, bloodied brokenness to an opposing state of leviathan pop with such effortlessness that it dominates all that stands before it." IZM's Minhyung Hyun observed that "the theme of 'temptation' that was a new concept following 'school' and 'youth' [series], fitted with their lyrics" and displayed growth towards "a slightly intense identity" than that "shown through their previous works" with the song. He also praised the production and dubbed the song's chorus as "addictive," which captured "emotions." For Tamara Fuentes of Seventeen, the song "ushers in the new era in a beautiful way."

=== Accolades ===
Billboard and Dazed selected "Blood Sweat & Tears" as one of the 20 best K-pop songs of 2016. The former ranked it at number 7 and 16 on their lists of the 100 best K-pop songs of 2010s and 100 greatest boy band songs of all time, respectively. GQ placed the song on their decade-end list of the best K-pop songs of the 2010s and picked it as the highlight of 2016. On behalf of the magazine, Glasby called the song BTS' "magnum opus." "Blood Sweat & Tears" was nominated for Song of the Year at the 2016 Mnet Asian Music Awards. The song achieved the top spot on various South Korean weekly music programs, garnering a total of six awards, including two consecutive wins on Music Bank. It also achieved two consecutive Melon Weekly Popularity Awards due to being a substantial success on digital platforms.

Awards for "Blood Sweat & Tears"
Year	Organization	Award	Result	Ref.
2016	18th Mnet Asian Music Awards	Best Dance Performance - Male Group	Won	
2016	18th Mnet Asian Music Awards	HotelsCombined Song of the Year	Nominated	
2017	6th Gaon Chart Music Awards	Song of the Year – October	Nominated	
2017	12th Annual Soompi Awards	Song of the Year	Won	

Music program awards for "Blood Sweat & Tears"
Program	Date	Ref.
Show Champion	October 19, 2016	
M Countdown	October 20, 2016	
Music Bank	October 21, 2016	
Music Bank	October 28, 2016	
Inkigayo	October 23, 2016	
The Show	October 25, 2016	

== Commercial performance ==
"Blood Sweat & Tears" was a commercial success in South Korea. It debuted at number one on the Gaon Digital Chart for the chart issue dated October 9–15, 2016, becoming BTS' first domestic number one. The song also peaked at number one on the component Download Chart, selling 198,987 digital units in its first week of release. "Blood Sweat & Tears" was the sixth best-performing song in October 2016 on the Gaon Monthly Digital Chart, based on digital sales, streaming, and background music (instrumental track) downloads. As of May 2019, "Blood Sweat & Tears" has sold over 2.5 million digital copies in South Korea. The song peaked at number one on the US Billboard World Digital Songs chart for the week of October 29, 2016, the band's second chart topper, following on from "Fire" (2016). In Canada, the song led to BTS becoming the third Korean act to chart on the Canadian Hot 100 by peaking at number 86, a new best for a K-pop group.

Following the release of "Blood Sweat & Tears" as a single album in Japan, the single album topped the Oricon Daily Singles Chart on its first day of release, selling 141,243 copies. "Blood Sweat & Tears" peaked at number one on the Oricon Weekly Singles Chart for the chart issue dated May 8–14, 2017, becoming BTS' second number one single on the chart. The single album sold 238,795 copies in its first week, making BTS the fastest foreign artist to surpass 200,000 copies in a week. In May 2017, the single sold 273,000 copies, achieving higher sales than the band's previous Japanese single album "Run" (2016). For the year end chart, the former ranked as the 22nd best-selling single of 2017 in Japan. It also became the second-highest charting single by a Korean artist in the country, the first being BTS' eighth Japanese single, "Mic Drop/ DNA / Crystal Snow" (2017) at number 13. "Blood Sweat & Tears" additionally charted at number one on the Billboard Japan Hot 100 for the issue dated May 22, 2017, selling 310,276 copies. In February 2018, "Blood Sweat & Tears" was certified platinum by the Recording Industry Association of Japan (RIAJ), denoting shipments of 250,000 copies in Japan.

== Music videos ==
An accompanying music video was released to Big Hit's YouTube channel on October 10, 2016; it was preceded by a teaser, which was released via the same platform on October 6. The video was directed by YongSeok Choi of Lumpens, with Edie YooJeong Ko serving as the assistant director. It was choreographed by Keone Madrid and Quick Style Crew, under the supervision of Sungdeuk Son. HyunWoo Nam of GDW received credit as the director of photography, while GyeungSeok Kim and MoonYoung Lee served as the gaffer and art director, respectively. Inspired by Hermann Hesse's 1919 coming of age novel Demian, the six-minute long visual heavily contains baroque symbolism, and explores the concepts of "fate, reality, life and death, and falling from grace."

A scene showing the seven members of BTS sitting together in an extravagant room, before the opening verse of "Blood Sweat & Tears". The baroque and classical imagery is featured throughout the entire music video.

The music video opens with the seven members of BTS exploring a museum that is filled with European Renaissance replications and weeping angels, and switches to showing the band posing together. The clip then zooms out briefly before depicting the seven members in a hall, where they start performing choreography as the opening line of the song plays. Footage alternates between close-up shots of each member staring directly into the camera and group-shots to the performance of "sensual choreography," which has their hands "constantly blind, seek, and reveal desire and truth." In some scenes, BTS drink colourful elixirs, wear blindfolds, blow smoke, and jump to and from the camera. Throughout the visual, the band members are seen dancing in multiple sets or being confined by extravagant rooms that have classic white sculptures kept in dark places, tied up or trapped. At one point, RM recites a passage from Demian, which is not included in the studio version of the song. The video features classical imagery and several references to literature and art, such as the quote "One must still have chaos within oneself to give birth to a dancing star" from the opening lines of Friedrich Nietzsche's philosophical novel Thus Spoke Zarathustra and the paintings The Lament for Icarus (1898) by Herbert James Draper, and Pieter Bruegel's The Fall of Icarus (1560) and The Fall of the Rebel Angels (1562). These serve as visual representations of emotions, including fear or danger, temptation and chaos. A scene featuring V jumping off a balcony in front of a painting of the fallen Icarus bears testimony to this. It follows a Biblical story-line of angels and demons, through portraying members in decadent settings and outfits as they try not to surrender to sin and temptation. Darker and complex elements in the video include shrouds and veils, which are in reference to afterlife. For its conclusion, Jin comes across a white concrete angel with black wings and is compelled to kiss it. As the visual ends, V poses with his wings ripped off to convey "the acceptance of imperfection that an angel could lose his wings."

Benjamin of Fuse noted the "darker" atmosphere of the music video, and called it "stunning." Glasby of Dazed wrote that the clip visually "captures a passionate, destructive relationship." Herman noted the metaphors presented in the visual and deemed it as "haunting." Dazed editor Selim Bulut ranked the visual at number nine on his list of the best music videos of 2016, while Billboard placed the video on their decade-end list of the best music videos of the 2010s, with Caitlin Kelley writing, "'Blood Sweat & Tears' is the thesis for BTS as a K-pop group whose work is rich for interpretation." The video was awarded the Best Music Video at the 2017 Seoul Music Awards. It earned nominations for Best Music Video at the 2017 Mnet Asian Music Awards and Fuse Music Video of the Year at the 2017 Annual Soompi Awards. The music video was an instant success on YouTube, surpassing 6.3 million views in 24 hours. Within 42 hours, it garnered over 10 million views on the platform and became the fastest music video by a K-pop group to do so. The visual was the most-viewed K-pop music video of October 2016 in the US. As of October 2025, the video has over 1 billion views.

A music video for the Japanese version of "Blood Sweat & Tears" was uploaded to Universal Japan's YouTube channel on May 9, 2017. While it is centered around art like the Korean version's video, the visual is more intense and includes references to the story-lines of those of "I Need U" and "Run". Portrayed in neon and psychedelic colours, the music video features a dark alternate dimension and multiple realities, in which the band members fight and try to kill each other.

== Live performances ==
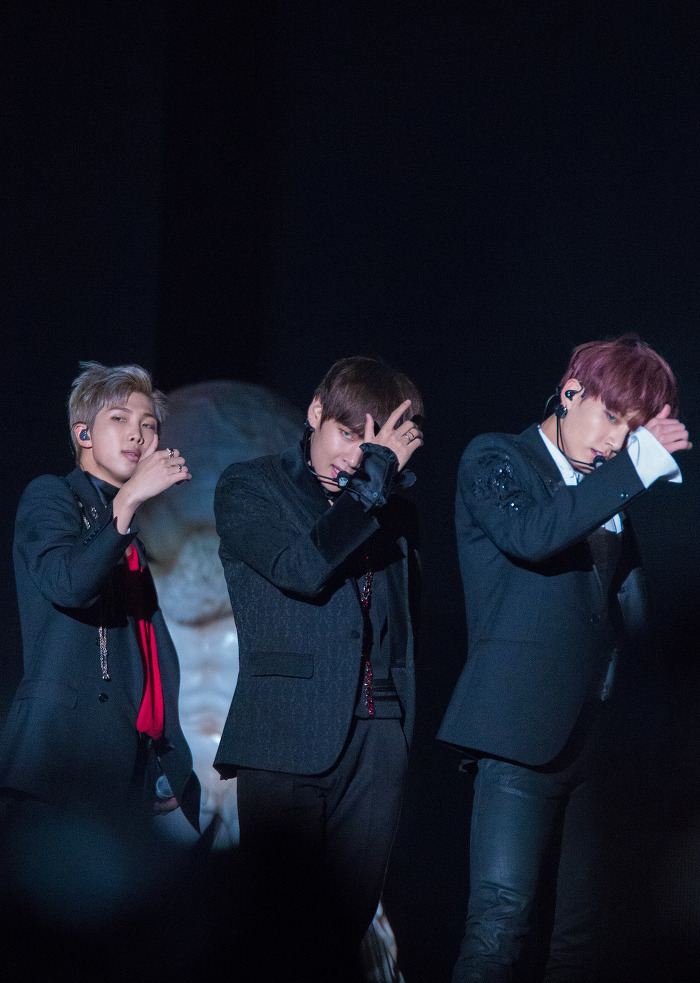
BTS members, RM, V and Jungkook performing "Blood, Sweat & Tears" at the 2016 Melon Music Awards.

To promote "Blood, Sweat & Tears" and Wings, BTS made several appearances on South Korean music programs around October and November 2016. They performed the song for the first time for Mnet's M! Countdown on October 13, 2016 as part of their comeback stage. The following three days, the band appeared on Music Bank, Show! Music Core, and Inkigayo, where they also performed "Am I Wrong" and "21st Century Girl". BTS performed the song at the 2016 Melon Music Awards alongside "Fire" on November 19, 2016. On December 2 of that year, the band performed the former live at the 2016 Mnet Asian Music Awards. As a prelude to the performance, Jungkook was suspended above the stage, while RM recited a passage from Demian. This was followed by a choreography to a rendition of "Boy Meets Evil" and "Lie" performed by J-Hope and Jimin, with the latter dancing to it blindfolded. They were then joined by the rest of the bandmates who appeared as "fallen angels." "Blood, Sweat & Tears" was also included on the setlist of BTS' The Wings Tour (2017).

== Track listings ==
Digital download / streaming – Korean version
No.	Title	Length
1.	"피 땀 눈물" (Blood Sweat & Tears)	3:37

Digital download / Regular CD Edition – Japanese version
No.	Title	Length
1.	"Chi, Ase, Namida"	3:35
2.	"Not Today"	3:52
3.	"Spring Day"	4:34
Total length:		12:01

Limited Edition A (CD + DVD) – Japanese version
No.	Title	Length
1.	"Chi, Ase, Namida"	3:35
2.	"Not Today"	3:52
3.	"Blood Sweat & Tears" (music video)
4.	"Chi, Ase, Namida" (music video)

Limited Edition B (CD + DVD) – Japanese version
No.	Title	Length
1.	"Chi, Ase, Namida"	3:35
2.	"Not Today"	3:52
3.	"Chi, Ase, Namida" (making of music video)
4.	"Chi, Ase, Namida" (making of jacket photos)

Limited Edition C (CD + Booklet) – Japanese version
No.	Title	Length
1.	"Chi, Ase, Namida"	3:35
2.	"Not Today"	3:52

== Credits and personnel ==
Credits are adapted from the CD liner notes of You Never Walk Alone. (Note: All credits are for both the Korean and Japanese versions of the song, unless otherwise specified.)

- BTS – primary vocals
- "Hitman" Bang – songwriting
- RM – songwriting
- Suga – songwriting
- J-Hope – songwriting
- Kim Doohyon – songwriting
- Pdogg – songwriting, production, synthesizer, keyboard, vocal arrangement, rap arrangement, record engineering
- KM-MARKIT – songwriting (Japanese version)
- Jungkook – chorus
- Jimin – chorus
- James F. Reynolds – mix engineering

== Charts ==
=== Weekly charts ===
Weekly chart performance for "Blood Sweat & Tears"
Chart (2016–17)	Peak position
Canada (Canadian Hot 100)	86
France (SNEP)	168
Japan (Japan Hot 100)	18
Japan (Japan Hot 100) Japanese ver.	1
Japan (Oricon) Japanese ver.	1
New Zealand Heatseeker Singles (RMNZ)	7
Philippines (Philippine Hot 100)	82
South Korea (Gaon)	1
UK Independent Singles Chart (OCC)	47
US World Digital Song Sales (Billboard)	1

=== Monthly charts ===
Monthly chart performance for "Blood Sweat & Tears"
Chart (October 2016)	Position
South Korea (Gaon)	6

=== Year-end charts ===
2016 year-end chart position for "Blood Sweat & Tears"
Chart (2016)	Position
South Korea (Gaon)	91

2017 year-end chart positions for "Blood Sweat & Tears"
Chart (2017)	Position
Japan (Japan Hot 100) Japanese ver.	27
Japan (Oricon) Japanese ver.	22
South Korea (Gaon)	73

== Certifications and sales ==
Certifications for "Blood Sweat & Tears"
Region	Certification	Certified units/sales
Japan (RIAJ)	Platinum	310,276
New Zealand (RMNZ)	Gold	15,000^{‡}
United Kingdom (BPI)	Silver	200,000^{‡}
United States (RIAA)	Platinum	1,000,000^{‡}
Streaming
Japan (RIAJ)	Gold	50,000,000^{†}
Japan (RIAJ) 血、汗、涙 (Japanese version)	Silver	30,000,000^{†}
^{‡} Sales+streaming figures based on certification alone.^{†} Streaming-only figures based on certification alone.

== Release history ==
Release dates and formats for "Blood Sweat & Tears"
Country	Date	Version	Format(s)	Label(s)	Ref.
Various	October 10, 2016	Korean	Digital download; streaming	Big Hit Entertainment	
Various	May 10, 2017	Japanese	Digital download; streaming	Universal; Virgin; Def Jam	
Japan	May 10, 2017	Japanese	CD single	Universal; Virgin; Def Jam	
Japan	May 10, 2017	Japanese	CD + DVD	Universal; Virgin; Def Jam	
Japan	May 10, 2017	Japanese	CD + Booklet	Universal; Virgin; Def Jam	

== See also ==
- List of Gaon Digital Chart number ones of 2016
- List of Hot 100 number-one singles of 2016 (Japan)
- List of Oricon number-one singles of 2016
