= Spring Day (song) =

2017 single by BTS

Single by BTS

from the album You Never Walk Alone
- Released: February 13, 2017
- Genre: Alternative hip hop; pop rock
- Length: 4:34
- Label: Big Hit; Universal Japan
- Songwriters: Pdogg; RM; Adora; "Hitman" Bang; Arlissa Ruppert; Peter Ibsen; Suga
- Producer: Pdogg

BTS singles chronology
| "Blood Sweat & Tears" (2016) | "Spring Day" (2017) | "Not Today" (2017) |

Music video
- "Spring Day" on YouTube

"Spring Day" (Korean: 봄날; RR: Bomnal) is a song recorded by South Korean boy band BTS for their 2017 album You Never Walk Alone, a repackage of their second Korean-language studio album, Wings (2016). The song was written by "Hitman" Bang, RM, Adora, Arlissa Ruppert, Peter Ibsen, Suga, and its producer Pdogg. It was released for digital download and streaming on February 13, 2017, as the album's lead single by Big Hit Entertainment. A remix of the song was subsequently released for free via SoundCloud on June 4, 2018. A Japanese version of the song was issued on May 10, 2017, through Universal Music Japan, as a B-side of the single album that included the tracks "Blood Sweat & Tears" and "Not Today", both also in Japanese. The song is an alternative hip hop and pop rock power ballad, which relies on rock instrumentation. The lyrics revolve around the themes of loss, longing, grief, and moving on.

The song received universal acclaim from music critics, who praised its production, sentimental lyrics and BTS' vocal delivery. "Spring Day" received several accolades, including Song of the Year at the 2017 Melon Music Awards, and appeared on the decade-end list of best K-pop songs by Billboard. Rolling Stone named it one of the greatest boy band songs of all time. Commercially, the song was a success in South Korea debuting at number one on the Gaon Digital Chart, and it has since sold over 2.5 million copies in the country. The song also peaked at number 15 on the US Billboard Bubbling Under Hot 100.

The music video for the song was directed by YongSeok Choi and premiered on February 12, 2017. Inspired by Ursula K. Le Guin's short story "The Ones Who Walk Away from Omelas" (1973) and Bong Joon-ho's movie Snowpiercer (2013), the video explores the concepts of death, afterlife and closure. The visual was acclaimed by critics for its heavy symbolism and was awarded Best Music Video at the 2017 Mnet Asian Music Awards. BTS promoted "Spring Day" with televised live performances on various South Korean music programs, including M! Countdown, Music Bank, and Inkigayo. The song was also included on the set list of the band's second worldwide concert tour, The Wings Tour (2017).

== Background and release ==
BTS released their second Korean-language studio album Wings in October 2016, which charted at number one on South Korea's Gaon Album Chart and became the best-selling album of 2016 in the country. Following the success of Wings, Big Hit Entertainment announced in January 2017 that a sequel to the album, titled You Never Walk Alone, would be served as a reissue. "Spring Day" was confirmed to be slated for release on the reissue when the band subsequently shared the track-listing of the album. On February 10, 2017, the song was announced as the lead single from the album. Band member RM created the main melody of the song, which he wrote between November and December 2016 during a walk at Saetgang Eco Park in Yeouido, taking inspiration from the dried leaves that were blown off trees by the wind. "Hitman" Bang, RM, Adora, Arlissa Ruppert, Peter Ibsen, Pdogg and Suga are credited as songwriters on "Spring Day", with the latter of the seven solely handling production. BTS recorded vocals for the track at Big Hit Studios, Seoul, South Korea. The track was engineered by Pdogg, Jeong Wooyeong, and Ibsen, while mixing was handled by James F. Reynolds at Schmuzik Studios.

"Spring Day" was released for digital download and streaming in various countries by Big Hit Entertainment on February 13, 2017, as the lead single from You Never Walk Alone. A "Brit Rock" remix version of the track was released for free to SoundCloud on June 4, 2018. The remix has identical songwriting credits to the original version, though "Hitman" Bang serves as the producer. A Japanese version of the song was recorded, which was issued digitally for purchase on May 10, 2017 by Universal Music Japan as a B-side track of BTS' seventh Japanese-language single album, together with the versions of their Korean singles "Blood Sweat & Tears" (2016) and "Not Today" (2017) in the same language. The single album was simultaneously released as a CD single in Japan. The lyrics for the Japanese version of "Spring Day" were written by KM-MARKIT. It was subsequently included as the tenth track on the band's third Japanese-language studio album Face Yourself (2018).

== Music and lyrics ==
"Spring Day"
A 27-second sample leading up to the pre-chorus of "Spring Day", an alternative hip hop and pop rock power ballad, driven by rock instrumentation. The lyrics address themes of loss and longing.

Musically, "Spring Day" is a midtempo alternative hip hop and pop rock power ballad, with Brit rock and electronic influences. The song is composed in the time signature of 4/4 time and the key of E♭ major, with a tempo of 108 beats per minute. Constructed in verse–chorus form, the verses have an Eb–Gm–Cm/Cm7–Ab chord progression, whilst the chorus follows an Eb–Gm–Ab–Abm sequence. The song relies on rock instrumentation that consists primarily of keyboards, synthesizer, guitar and bass. Band member Jungkook provided backing vocals for the track alongside Arlissa Ruppert.

The production of the song makes use of EDM synths, thick compressed bass and piano. It further utilizes a "mechanical hissing" percussion and "whining" electronic sounds, which provide "an enveloping airlock." The song consists of "rap-breaks," "dreamy" vocals and "half-spoken" deliveries, for which BTS' vocal range spans from B_{3} to B_{5}. The verses are driven by "dense" chords, "pain-shredding" guitar strums and "whirring" synths. A reviewer from The Singles Jukebox compared the chords in the composition to that of Flo Rida"s song "Wild Ones" (2011).

Speaking about the concept and meaning behind "Spring Day" during a V Live broadcast, RM stated that he wrote the lyrics when thinking of his middle and high-school mates, from whom he hadn't heard in a long time. RM compared the song's mood to that of the band's 2015 singles, "I Need U" and "Run". Lyrically, the song uses a seasonal metaphor to compare the longing and separation from loved ones to "internal winter." The verses use "snow-y imagery" to explore themes of loss, yearning, grief, and moving on: "I wanna hold your hand/ And go to the other side of the earth/ Wanna put an end this winter/ How much do I have to long for you like snow piles up on the ground/ Until the spring days come?" The line, "Like a snowpiercer, I was left alone" is a reference to Bong Joon-ho's movie Snowpiercer (2013), while "I hate even this moment that is passing by" is a line used to suggest the "ephemerality" of life. The track's lyrics also speak of "a mature society that can embrace the wounds of others," and they touch upon themes of mental health and depression. During the chorus, the line "I want to see you" is repeated several times. Towards the end of the song, the band relay comfort and warmth to the listener by being hopeful of a reunion: "No darkness, no season/ Can last forever."

== Critical reception ==
"Spring Day" was met with widespread critical acclaim from music critics and fans. Jeff Benjamin of Billboard praised the track's lyrical content and BTS' vocal delivery, writing that the song "showed an artistic turning point for the band, who have now evolved past a one-track mind with their music and lyrics, as the guys set the groundwork for their biggest material to date." In another review for the same magazine, Benjamin stated that while the song keeps up with the "hard-hitting beats, buttery vocals and punchy rap verses—as one would expect from any BTS release, it's "newfound maturity and enlightenment that makes the single stand out so much." Caitlin Kelley, also of Billboard, cited the track as one of the best songs by BTS and said that it "packs an emotional wallop as the lyrics hover in the bargaining stage of coping with the absence of a loved one." Taylor Glasby of Dazed lauded the song's production and the band's vocal delivery, regarding the track as "an intelligent, compelling and elegantly restrained study of loss and longing" that "deliberately avoids cliché pomp and drama." Glasby also wrote an article for Vogue, in which she called the song an "epic ballad." IZM's Hyo-beom Jeong acclaimed the track, highlighting the "high degree of perfection" in its music and he regarded the track as a "smooth lyric progression, easy listening melody, and lyrical song that spans generations." Jeong added, "this is a delicate and sad sensibility different from the intense 'BTS' hip-hop style. Among the songs they released this year, 'Spring Day' was the reason why they consistently received popular love."

Jacques Peterson of Idolator said the band "tugged on the heartstrings with this hit," which he felt is "K-pop's answer to the Mariah Carey classic 'One Sweet Day'." In The Malaysia Star, Chester Chin regarded the song as "the most vulnerable cut" on You Never Walk Alone and opined that it "sees the boys baring their soul, shedding light on a more sentimental side of the group." Reviewing for Vulture, T.K. Park and Youngdae Kim felt that the song "opened a new chapter in [BTS'] aesthetics" by "substituting the group's previous calling card in hip-hop with the romanticism in pop and rock." They further wrote that "each component of the song contains a clear melody, evoking overwhelming nostalgia and longing." Music journalist Youngdae Kim said that the track displayed significant growth in the band's sound, lyricism and aesthetics by embodying nostalgia and sorrow. Rhian Daly of NME listed it as BTS' best song, labelling the track an "absolutely gorgeous, a stirring piece of alt-pop." He also praised the track's lyrical content and said that it is "a classic – a glistening jewel in a canonical crown bedazzled with them." Hyun-su Yim from The Korea Herald acclaimed the song, stating that it "has beautiful melodies without getting too soppy, as crisp vocals and clean guitar riffs aided by sentimental lyrics make for easy listening." On the other hand, Sungmi Ahn, of the same publication, described the song as an "emotional pop rock tune." Theresa Reyes of Vice was impressed by "the ballad's complex metaphors on love, life, and death." Malvika Padin from Clash also enjoyed the track and considered it "always-emotive."

Billboard, Dazed and IZM selected "Spring Day" as one of the best K-pop songs of 2017 on their respective lists. The former of the three ranked it at number 37 on their decade-end list of the 100 best K-pop songs of the 2010s. On behalf of the publication, L. Singh wrote that the existence of the song "is probably the most accurate representation of BTS's artistry." Rolling Stone placed it at number 19 on their 2020 list of the greatest boy-band songs of all time and called the song "a sentiment as timeless as BTS have become."

"Spring Day" on select critic lists
| Publication | List | Rank | Ref. |
|---|---|---|---|
| Billboard | The 20 Best K-pop Songs of 2017 | 5 | |
| Billboard | The 100 Greatest K-pop Songs of the 2010s: Staff List | 37 | |
| Dazed | The 20 Best K-pop Songs of 2017 | 1 | |
| IZM | The Best Songs of 2017 | No order | |
| Rolling Stone | 75 Greatest Boy Band Songs of All Time | 19 | |
| Rolling Stone | 100 Greatest Songs in the History of Korean Pop Music | 4 | |
| Rolling Stone | The 500 Greatest Songs of All Time | 280 | |
| Rolling Stone | The 250 Greatest Songs of the 21st Century So Far | 37 | |

=== Awards ===
"Spring Day" won the Song of the Year award at the 2017 Melon Music Awards. It won the Digital Bonsang at the 32nd Golden Disc Awards. The song also achieved the top spot on various South Korean weekly music programs, garnering a total of four awards. It also achieved a Melon Weekly Popularity Award for the week of February 20, 2017, due to the substantial success of the song on digital platforms.

Awards for "Spring Day"
| Year | Organization | Award | Result | Ref. |
|---|---|---|---|---|
| 2017 | 9th Melon Music Awards | Song of the Year | Won | |
| 2018 | 32nd Golden Disc Awards | Digital Bonsang | Won | |
| 2018 | 32nd Golden Disc Awards | Digital Daesang | Nominated | |
| 2018 | 7th Gaon Chart Music Awards | Song of the Year – February | Nominated | |

Music program awards
| Program | Date | Ref. |
|---|---|---|
| Show Champion | February 22, 2017 | |
| M Countdown | February 23, 2017 | |
| Music Bank | February 24, 2017 | |
| Inkigayo | February 26, 2017 | |

== Commercial performance ==
"Spring Day" was a commercial success in South Korea. Upon release, it topped the charts of all eight major domestic music streaming services, including Melon, Mnet, Genie Music, and Olleh, and went on to debut atop the Gaon Digital Chart issue for the week of February 12–18, 2017. It also peaked at number one on the component Download Chart, selling 215,224 digital units in its release week. Per Gaon's monthly digital chart update, "Spring Day" was the sixth best-performing song of February based on digital sales, streaming, and background music (instrumental track) downloads. On the year-end chart, it was the 13th best-performing song overall in South Korea. By September 2018, the song had sold over 2.5 million digital copies in the country. "Spring Day" is the longest-charting song on Melon's digital chart to date.

In the United States, "Spring Day" sold 14,000 copies in its opening week, earning BTS their third number one on the World Digital Song Sales chart, for the week of March 4, 2017; it also charted on the Bubbling Under Hot 100 at number 15. Elsewhere, the song peaked at numbers 24 and 38 on the UK Independent Singles Chart and Billboard Japan Hot 100 respectively.

== Music video ==
=== Background ===
The music video for "Spring Day" premiered via Big Hit's YouTube channel on February 12, 2017; it was preceded by a teaser, which was released to the same platform on February 9. The video was directed by YongSeok Choi of Lumpens, with WonJu Lee serving as the assistant director. HyunWoo Nam of GDW was credited as the director of photography, while Emma SungEun kim received credit as the producer. HyunSuk Song served as the gaffer and JinSil Park was the art director. Filming for the music video took place in Hwaseong, Yangju, and Gangneung. The video was inspired by Ursula K. Le Guin's 1973 short philosophical fiction "The Ones Who Walk Away from Omelas", as well as the movie Snowpiercer. The five-minute long visual is heavily loaded with symbolism and explores the concepts of "death, afterlife and closure."

=== Synopsis ===
BTS standing in the middle of a snow-covered field, gazing at a solitary bare tree in the music video for "Spring Day". This symbolises the beginning of "a new journey with their friendship as their salvation."

The music video opens with V standing in the middle of a snow-capped railway station, which has rusty signboards and a faded slate roof. In the station, he steps onto the tracks and leans down to the ground to listen to an oncoming train. The clip then zooms out to depict a train running in the middle of winter, carrying suitcases of passengers who are not present themselves. The scene switches to show Jungkook sitting inside the train as he waits for someone, while Jimin is seen alone on an empty beach. The following scene begins with a close-up shot of RM, who stands inside an empty train compartment as the opening line of "Spring Day" starts playing. He runs out of the train towards J-Hope and Suga, while they are sitting in front of a building with a neon signboard that reads "Omelas". RM opens a green door that leads him back to the train and he passes by the chamber in which Jungkook is sitting. RM opens another door when inside the train, which leads to a room where the rest of the members are enjoying a birthday party, throwing cakes and playing with each other.

The video then zooms in to depict a close-up shot of Jin gazing up a staircase, on which the other members are ascending, eventually leaving him alone at the bottom. Jungkook is seen standing in front an old, rusty amusement park ride that has the words "You Never Walk Alone" written on it. The clip alternates between lonely, muted shots of each member, and contrasting bright and cordial group-shots of BTS as they spend time with one another. In one scene, Suga is seen rapping as he sits on a mountain of laundry, while in another, J-Hope sits on top of the moving train as he flies a paper plane into the air. At one point, Jungkook opens the door to the Omelas, as he reunites with the other members. He wakes up inside the train to see the members sitting together with him. As the train stops, they step out into the daylight on a field where the snow is gradually melting. The band walk together towards a solitary, bare tree that stands in the middle of the field, even though Jimin is the only member who is physically present there. He hangs a pair of shoes on the tree's branches, which he had picked up from the shore. The reunion of the seven members alludes to the beginning of "a new journey with their friendship as their salvation." To end the visual, a closing shot is shown of the tree blooming with cherry blossom leaves, against the backdrop of blue spring sky, with the pair of shoes hanging from the branches.

=== Reception ===
Several fans and media publications speculated that the visual references the Sewol Ferry Disaster that took place on April 16, 2014, which left more than 300 students missing or dead. In this regard, RM stated that the video focuses on the visual representation of the song's lyrics and can be interpreted in many ways. Tamar Herman of Billboard wrote that the music video "reflects the album's title and transmutes 'Spring Day' from a love song into an ode dedicated to the dead." In his review for Fuse, Benjamin labelled the visual as "gorgeously cinematic and moving." Glasby deemed the visual as a "slow motion, cinematic landscape of memories and wishes." Though she lauded the "external devices" used to "illustrate certain points," Glasby felt that "the most devastatingly evocative moments" in the video are "quietly simple." Emlyn Travis of PopCrush opined that the clip "stunningly" captures "the idea of a loss of innocence that changes one's life forever." The music video was awarded Best Music Video at the 2017 Mnet Asian Music Awards and Fuse Video of the Year at the 2018 Annual Soompi Awards. It was an instant success on YouTube, garnering over 10 million views in 24 hours, becoming the fastest K-pop video to do so at the time. A week later, the music video for BTS' follow up single "Not Today" overtook the record with 10 million views in a shorter period of time. The video for "Spring Day" also became the fastest K-pop group music video to reach 20 million views, achieving the feat in less than four days. It was the sixth most viewed K-pop music video of 2017 on YouTube. As of April 2021, the video has over 400 million views on the platform.

== Live performances ==
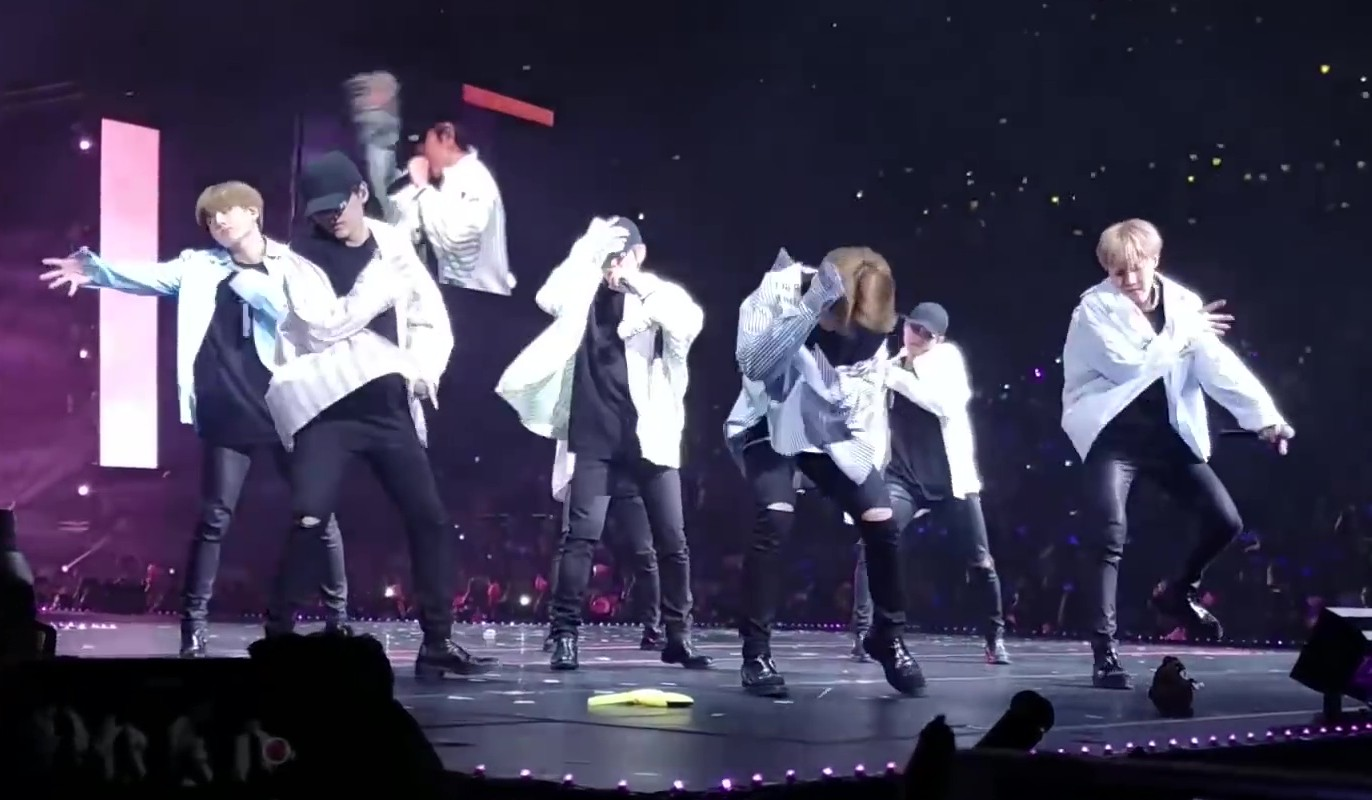
BTS performing "Spring Day" during The Wings Tour in 2017.

BTS performed "Spring Day" live for the first time on February 18, 2017, as part of their setlist for the band's two-day stop during The Wings Tour at Gocheok Sky Dome, Seoul. To promote the song and You Never Walk Alone, BTS made several appearances on South Korean music programs in February 2017. The band gave their first televised live performance of the song for M! Countdown on February 23, 2017. The following three days, they appeared on Music Bank, Show! Music Core, and Inkigayo, where they also performed "Not Today". BTS performed the song at the 2017 Melon Music Awards alongside "DNA" (2017) on December 2, 2017. On December 29 of that year, the band performed the remix version of the track at the KBS Song Festival. They performed the song at the 32nd Golden Disc Awards on January 10, 2018. BTS sang it as part of their three-song set for YouTube's Dear Class of 2020 online graduation ceremony on June 7, 2020, at the National Museum of Korea, with the band wearing soft pastel-coloured outfits. It was also included in the setlist at the 2020 iHeartRadio Music Festival on September 18. A studio live band rendition of the track was performed at NPR's Tiny Desk (Home) Concert on September 21 with an intro from RM, "It's been the roughest summer ever, but we know that spring will come," offering comfort and optimism during the COVID-19 pandemic.

== Track listings ==
Digital download / streaming – Korean version
| No. | Title | Length |
|---|---|---|
| 1. | "Spring Day" | 4:34 |

Free streaming – Brit Rock Remix
| No. | Title | Length |
|---|---|---|
| 1. | "Spring Day" (Brit Rock Remix) | 6:17 |

Digital download / CD single – Japanese version
| No. | Title | Length |
|---|---|---|
| 1. | "Chi, Ase, Namida" | 3:35 |
| 2. | "Not Today" | 3:52 |
| 3. | "Spring Day" | 4:34 |
| Total length: | | 12:01 |

== Credits and personnel ==
=== Korean / Japanese version ===
Credits are adapted from the CD liner notes of You Never Walk Alone and Chi, Ase, Namida. (Note: All credits are for both the Korean and Japanese versions of the song unless otherwise specified.)

- BTS – primary vocals
- "Hitman" Bang – songwriting
- RM – songwriting
- Suga – songwriting
- Adora – songwriting
- Arlissa Ruppert – songwriting, chorus
- Peter Ibsen – songwriting, record engineering
- Pdogg – songwriting, production, synthesizer, keyboard, vocal arrangement, rap arrangement, record engineering
- KM-MARKIT – songwriting (Japanese version)
- Jungkook – chorus
- Jeong Jaepil – guitar
- Lee Jooyeong – bass
- Jeong Wooyeong – record engineering
- James F. Reynolds – mix engineering

=== Brit Rock Remix ===
Credits are adapted from SoundCloud.

- BTS – primary vocals
- "Hitman" Bang – production, songwriting
- RM – songwriting
- Suga – songwriting
- Adora – songwriting
- Arlissa Ruppert – songwriting
- Peter Ibsen – songwriting, record engineering
- Hiss Noise – additional rhythm programming
- DOCSKIM – band arrangement
- KHAN – band arrangement
- Yang Ga – mix engineering

== Charts ==
=== Weekly charts ===
Weekly chart performance for "Spring Day"
| Chart (2017–2022) | Peak position |
|---|---|
| Canada (Canadian Hot 100) | 100 |
| Finland Download (Latauslista) | 6 |
| Japan (Japan Hot 100) | 38 |
| Malaysia (RIM) | 9 |
| New Zealand Heatseeker Singles (RMNZ) | 3 |
| Philippines (Philippine Hot 100) | 56 |
| South Korea (Gaon) | 1 |
| UK Independent Singles Chart (OCC) | 24 |
| UK Singles Downloads Chart (OCC) | 46 |
| US Bubbling Under Hot 100 (Billboard) | 15 |
| US World Digital Song Sales (Billboard) | 1 |
| Vietnam (Vietnam Hot 100) | 48 |

=== Monthly charts ===
2017 monthly chart performance for "Spring Day"
| Chart (February 2017) | Position |
|---|---|
| South Korea (Gaon) | 6 |

=== Year-end charts ===
Year-end chart performance for "Spring Day"
| Chart | Year | Position |
|---|---|---|
| South Korea (Gaon) | 2017 | 13 |
| South Korea (Gaon) | 2018 | 31 |
| South Korea (Gaon) | 2019 | 48 |
| South Korea (Gaon) | 2020 | 47 |
| South Korea (Gaon) | 2021 | 45 |
| South Korea (Circle) | 2022 | 76 |
| South Korea (Circle) | 2023 | 73 |
| South Korea (Circle) | 2024 | 76 |
| South Korea (Circle) | 2025 | 96 |

== Certifications and sales ==
Certifications and sales for "Spring Day"
| Region | Certification | Certified units/sales |
|---|---|---|
| New Zealand (RMNZ) | Gold | 15,000^{‡} |
| South Korea | — | 5,000,000 |
| United States (RIAA) | Gold | 500,000^{‡} |
Streaming
| Japan (RIAJ) | Platinum | 100,000,000^{†} |
^{‡} Sales+streaming figures based on certification alone.^{†} Streaming-only figures based on certification alone.

== Release history ==
Release dates and formats for "Spring Day"
| Country | Date | Version | Format(s) | Label(s) | Ref. |
|---|---|---|---|---|---|
| Various | February 13, 2017 | Korean | Digital download; streaming | Big Hit Entertainment | |
| Various | May 10, 2017 | Japanese | Digital download; streaming | Universal Music; Def Jam Recordings; Virgin Music | |
| Japan | May 10, 2017 | Japanese | CD single | Universal Music; Def Jam Recordings; Virgin Music | |
| Various | June 4, 2018 | Brit Rock Remix | Free streaming | Big Hit | |

== See also ==
- List of Gaon Digital Chart number ones of 2017
