= Not Today (BTS song) =

2017 single by BTS

Single by BTS

from the album You Never Walk Alone
- Language: Korean
- A-side: "Blood Sweat & Tears"
- Released: February 20, 2017
- Genre: Hip hop; moombahton
- Length: 3:51
- Label: Big Hit; Universal Japan
- Songwriters: "Hitman" Bang; Pdogg; RM; Supreme Boi; June; ADORA
- Producer: Pdogg

BTS singles chronology
| "Spring Day" (2017) | "Not Today" (2017) | "DNA" (2017) |

Music videos
- "Not Today" on YouTube

"Not Today" is a song recorded by South Korean boy band BTS for their 2017 album You Never Walk Alone, a repackage of their second Korean-language studio album, Wings (2016). The song was written by "Hitman" Bang, RM, Supreme Boi, June, Adora and Pdogg, with the latter of the five also handling production. It was released on February 20, 2017, as the album's second single by Big Hit Entertainment. A Japanese version of the song was recorded and issued on May 10, 2017, through Universal Music Japan, as a B-side of the single album that included tracks "Blood Sweat & Tears" (2016) and "Spring Day" (2017), both also in Japanese. It was subsequently included on the band's third Japanese-language studio album, Face Yourself (2018). "Not Today" is a hip hop and moombahton song which relies on synth-heavy instrumentation. The track's lyrics address themes of injustice, corruption and anti-establishment.

The song received generally favourable reviews from music critics, who praised its energetic sound and lyrical content. Commercially, "Not Today" peaked at number six on South Korea's Gaon Digital Chart and reached number one on the US Billboard World Digital Songs chart. The song also charted at number 23 on the Billboard Japan Hot 100 and number 77 on the Canadian Hot 100.

The music video for the song directed by Sung-wook Kim of GDW was released on February 20, 2017. Inspired by the Lord of the Rings film series, it features the band performing "powerful" choreography with a group of black-clad back-up dancers in the backdrop of rocky valleys. A dance version of the video features close-up and wide-angled shots of the band performing choreography to the song. BTS promoted the song with televised live performances on various South Korean music programs, including M! Countdown, Music Bank, and Inkigayo. It was also included on the set lists of the band's The Wings Tour (2017) and Love Yourself: Speak Yourself World Tour (2019).

== Background and release ==
BTS released their second Korean-language studio album, Wings, in October 2016, which charted at number one on the Gaon Album Chart and became the best-selling album of 2016 in South Korea. Big Hit Entertainment announced in January 2017 that a sequel to the album, titled You Never Walk Alone, would be served as a reissue. You Never Walk Alone yielded two singles; the first one was "Spring Day", released on February 13, 2017, by Big Hit. On February 12, "Not Today" was announced as another single from the album. The song was written by "Hitman" Bang, RM, Supreme Boi, June, Adora and its producer Pdogg. BTS recorded vocals for the track at Big Hit Studios, Seoul. It was engineered by Pdogg and June, while mixing was handled by James F. Reynolds at Schmuzik Studios.

"Not Today" was released for digital download and streaming in various countries by Big Hit on February 20, 2017, as the second single from You Never Walk Alone. A Japanese version of the song was recorded and issued digitally for purchase on May 10, 2017, by Universal Music Japan as a B-side track of the band's seventh Japanese-language single album. It also contains the Japanese versions of their Korean singles "Blood Sweat & Tears" and "Spring Day". It was also released as a four-version CD single in Japan on the same day, with a regular edition and three different limited editions: A, B and C. All four editions contain Japanese versions of "Blood, Sweat & Tears" as A-side and "Not Today" as a B-side track, while the Japanese version of "Spring Day" is present exclusively on the regular edition. In addition, edition A includes a DVD containing music videos for the Korean and Japanese versions of "Blood, Sweat & Tears". Edition B also comes with a DVD that contains behind the scenes footage of the music video for the Japanese version of "Blood, Sweat & Tears" and the making of album jacket photos, while edition C contains a 36-page photobook. The lyrics for the Japanese version were written by KM-Markit. It was subsequently included as the fifth track on the band's third Japanese-language studio album, Face Yourself (2018).

== Music and lyrics ==
"Not Today"
A 23-second sample of the "vocal-centric" pre-chorus of "Not Today", a hip hop and moombahton song, which utilises a synth-based production. The lyrics address themes of injustice, corruption and anti-establishment.

"Not Today" is a hip hop and moombahton song, with a length of 3 minutes and 51 seconds. Instrumentation is provided by keyboards and synthesizer. The song employs a synth-based production consisting of "pounding" beats, "intense" sound and heavy instrumentals. It has more of an "aggro-pop" sound like that of their early songs, "Dope" (2015) and "Fire" (2016). The track consists of "inconspicuous" verses that are primarily rap-driven, and use "explosive" and "combative" delivery. The pre-chorus is "vocal-centric" which leads to a "bombastic" chorus, having a "klaxon-like sound."

The lyrics of "Not Today" speak of overcoming obstacles and keep fighting, while instilling hope in oneself. Speaking about the concept and meaning of the song, RM said, "I wrote the lyrics for BTS so we do not stay silent against social issues and injustice and continue to solve it and raise problem. We talk about social issues, read books and meet with experts and ponder together. We still have a long way to go, but we will think hard and embrace criticism." In the opening lyrics, RM calls out to "all the underdogs in the world." It discusses the theme of anti-establishment that was featured in their previous singles "No More Dream" and "N.O.", through lines like, "A day may come when we lose/ But it is not today/ Today we fight!" During the chorus, the band speak of rallying against injustice, corruption and irrationality; "Don’t kneel, don’t cry, raise your hands Not not today." The line, "Break the glass ceiling that cages you" references the idea of breaking all invisible barriers that stop people from succeeding. Tamar Herman of Billboard believed that the lyrics addressed social and political issues.

== Reception ==
"Not Today" received generally positive reviews from music critics. Rhian Daly of NME listed it as one of the best songs of BTS and praised the track's lyrical content stating that it is "a fiery, fierce track on which they encourage their fans to live their best lives." Sungmi Ahn from The Korea Herald acclaimed the song for staying "true to BTS’ hip-hop driven roots" which she felt "is what the band excels at." She further deemed the track as "exhilarating" and added that it "pumps up listeners." Dam-young Hong, also of The Korea Herald, dubbed the song a "pulsating banger." Writing for Billboard, Monique Melendez praised the song's message and sound labelling it as "equal parts social commentary and floor-shaking thrills." For Digital Music News, Paul Resnikoff called the track "high energy" and "explosive" with "an elaborate dance and multiple backdrops." Allison Franks from Consequence of Sound enjoyed the track and deemed it as an "explosive rap-based anthem", while Markos Papadatos of Digital Journal regarded it as an "upbeat and spitfire" single.

"Not Today" debuted and peaked at number six on the Gaon Digital Chart for the chart issue dated February 12–18, 2017. It also peaked at number four on the component Download Chart, selling 100,482 digital units in its first week. "Not Today" was the 32nd-best-performing song of the February 2017 issue of the Gaon Monthly Digital Chart based on digital sales, streaming, and background music (instrumental track) downloads. As of December 2017, it has sold 258,206 digital units in the country. The song debuted at number two on the US Billboard World Digital Songs Chart for the issue date of March 4, 2017, selling 12,000 digital downloads in its first week. The following week, it climbed to the top spot, giving BTS their fourth number one on the chart following "Fire", "Blood Sweat & Tears" and "Spring Day". Additionally, it peaked at number 23 on the Billboard Japan Hot 100, and number 77 on the Canadian Hot 100.

== Music video ==
A music video for "Not Today", directed by Sung-wook Kim of GDW, was uploaded on Big Hit's YouTube channel on February 20, 2017, at 00:00 KST; it was preceded by a teaser released on the same platform on February 10. It was choreographed by Keone Madrid. The video is five minutes long and was inspired by the Lord of the Rings film series. The video commences with a shot of the seven members being chased by a crowd clad in black, before switching to show the title of the song. It then transitions to show RM inside a factory, walking into the frame. He is then joined by the rest of the members as they start performing "powerful" choreography, similar to that of their "beat-heavy" singles "Dope" and "Fire". The band members are surrounded by a group of 30 back-up dancers who are dressed in black, ninja-inspired outfits. The clip is interspersed with scenes which depict the band in the backdrop of rocky valleys, where they perform "rapid-fire" dances propelled by the "stomping" move in the choreography. In other scenes, they are either being chased or shot at. At one point, the back-up dancers throw off their "restricting" garments, seemingly "to protest in military-style formations." The video concludes with a shot of the song's title displayed in black against a white background. The music video was an instant success on YouTube, garnering over 13 million views in 24 hours, becoming the fastest K-pop video to surpass 10 million views at the time. It was the third most viewed K-pop music video of 2017 on YouTube. As of May 2020, the video has over 400 million views. A choreography version of the video was released on February 27, 2017. The eight-minute clip features close-up and wide-angled shots of the band performing powerful choreography to the song.

== Live performances ==
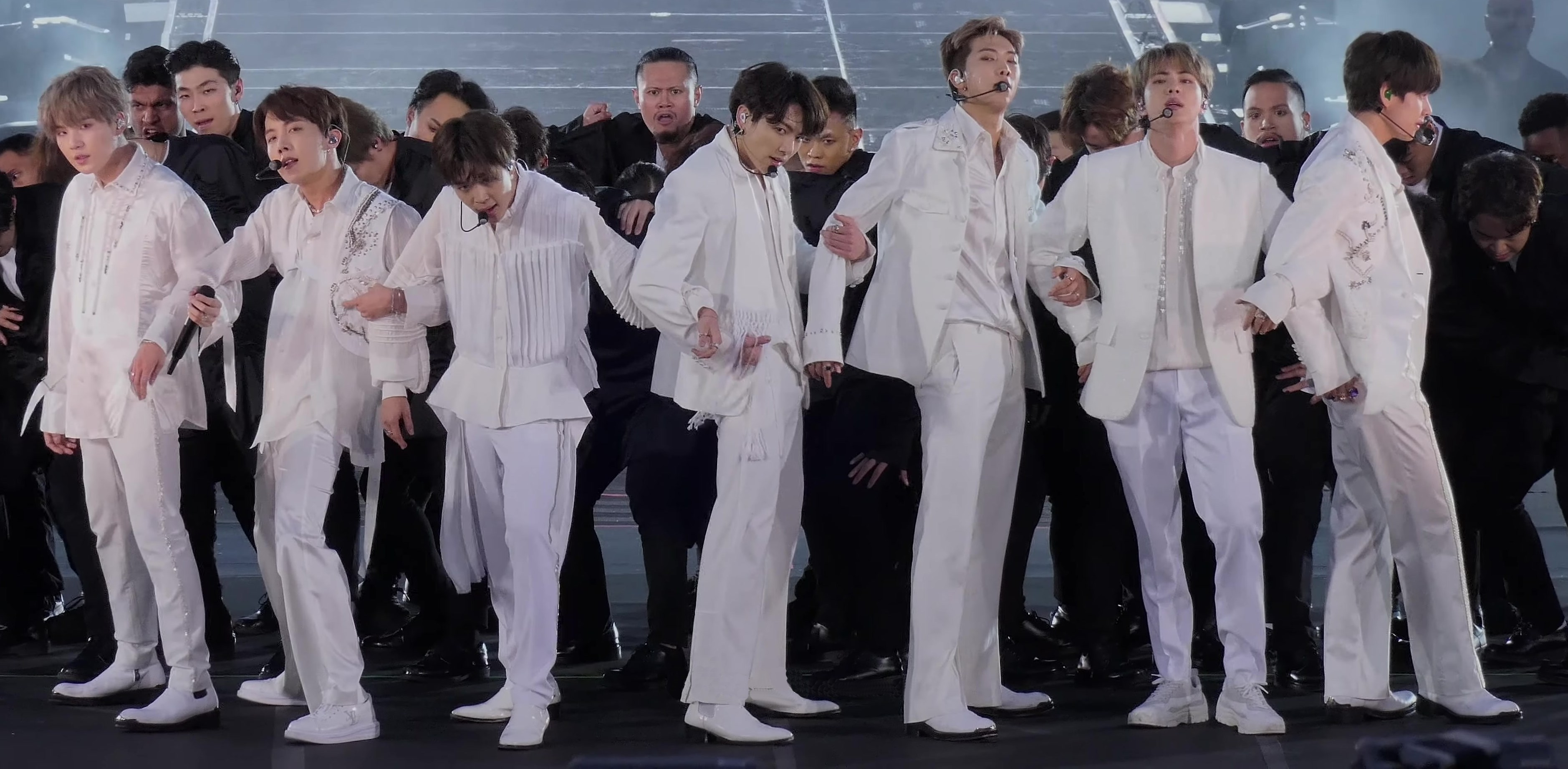
BTS performing "Not Today" during the Love Yourself: Speak Yourself World Tour at MetLife Stadium, East Rutherford, New Jersey on May 18, 2019

BTS performed "Not Today" live for the first time on February 18, 2017, as part of their setlist for the two-day stop of The Wings Tour (2017) at Gocheok Sky Dome, Seoul. To promote "Not Today" and the album, BTS made several appearances on South Korean music programs in February 2017. The band gave their first televised live performance of the song on Mnet's M! Countdown on February 23. The following three days, the group appeared on Music Bank, Show! Music Core, and Inkigayo where they also performed "Spring Day". BTS performed the song at the 2017 Mnet Asian Music Awards alongside "DNA" and "Mic Drop" on December 2. The band performed the song at the SBS Gayo Daejeon music festival on December 25. On December 29, they performed a rock remix version of the track at the 2017 KBS Song Festival. They performed the song again at the 32nd Golden Disc Awards on January 10, 2018. "Not Today" was also included on the setlist of BTS' Love Yourself: Speak Yourself World Tour (2019).

== Track listings ==
- Digital download / streaming – Korean version
1. "Not Today" – 3:51
- Digital download / Regular CD Edition – Japanese version
1. "Chi, Ase, Namida" – 3:35
2. "Not Today" – 3:52
3. "Spring Day" – 4:34
- Limited Edition A (CD + DVD) – Japanese version
1. "Chi, Ase, Namida" – 3:35
2. "Not Today" – 3:52
3. "Spring Day" – 4:34
4. "Blood Sweat & Tears" (music video)
5. "Chi, Ase, Namida" (music video)
- Limited Edition B (CD + DVD) – Japanese version
1. "Chi, Ase, Namida" – 3:35
2. "Not Today" – 3:52
3. "Spring Day" – 4:34
4. "Chi, Ase, Namida" (making of music video)
5. "Chi, Ase, Namida" (making of jacket photos)
- Limited Edition C (CD + Booklet) – Japanese version
1. "Chi, Ase, Namida" – 3:35
2. "Not Today" – 3:52
3. "Spring Day" – 4:34

== Credits and personnel ==
Credits are adapted from the CD liner notes of You Never Walk Alone. (Note: All credits are for both Korean and Japanese versions of the song unless otherwise specified.)

- BTS – primary vocals
- "Hitman" Bang – songwriting
- RM – songwriting
- Supreme Boi – songwriting
- June – chorus, songwriting, record engineering
- KM-Markit – songwriting (Japanese version)
- Jungkook – chorus
- Pdogg – production, songwriting, synthesizer, keyboard, vocal arrangement, rap arrangement, record engineering
- Jeong Wooyeong – record engineering
- James F. Reynolds – mix engineering

== Charts ==
| Chart (2017–2022) | Peak position |
|---|---|
| Canada (Canadian Hot 100) | 77 |
| Finland Download (Suomen virallinen latauslista) | 7 |
| Japan (Japan Hot 100) | 23 |
| New Zealand Heatseeker Singles (RMNZ) | 9 |
| Philippines (Philippine Hot 100) | 69 |
| Russia (Tophit) | 100 |
| South Korea (Gaon) | 6 |
| UK Independent Singles (OCC) | 46 |
| US World Digital Song Sales (Billboard) | 1 |
| Vietnam (Vietnam Hot 100) | 94 |

== Certifications ==
| Region | Certification | Certified units/sales |
Streaming
| Japan (RIAJ) | Gold | 50,000,000^{†} |
^{†} Streaming-only figures based on certification alone.

== Release history ==
Release dates and formats for "Not Today"
| Country | Date | Version | Format(s) | Label(s) | Ref. |
|---|---|---|---|---|---|
| Various | February 20, 2017 | Korean | Digital download; streaming | Big Hit | |
| Various | May 10, 2017 | Japanese | Digital download; streaming | Def Jam; Virgin | |
| Japan | May 10, 2017 | Japanese | CD single | Def Jam; Virgin | |
| Japan | May 10, 2017 | Japanese | CD+DVD | Def Jam; Virgin | |
| Japan | May 10, 2017 | Japanese | CD+Booklet | Def Jam; Virgin | |
