= Wings (BTS album) =

2016 album by South Korean boy band BTS

- Digital album cover art

Studio album by BTS
- Released: October 10, 2016
- Recorded: 2016
- Genres: Hip-hop; EDM; R&B; tropical house; moombahton; dance-pop
- Length: 53:34
- Languages: Korean; English
- Labels: Big Hit; Loen; Pony Canyon
- Producer: Pdogg

BTS chronology
Youth (2016)	Wings (2016)	Love Yourself: Her (2017)

Singles from Wings
- 1. "Blood Sweat & Tears" Released: October 10, 2016

You Never Walk Alone
- Left version and digital cover

Singles from You Never Walk Alone
- 1. "Spring Day" Released: February 13, 2017; 2. "Not Today" Released: February 20, 2017

Wings (stylized in all caps) is the second Korean and fourth overall studio album by South Korean boy band BTS. The album was released on October 10, 2016, by Big Hit Entertainment. It is available in four versions and contains fifteen tracks, with "Blood Sweat & Tears" serving as its lead single. Heavily influenced by Hermann Hesse's coming of age novel, Demian, the concept album thematically deals with temptation and growth. It was later reissued as a repackage album, titled You Never Walk Alone, on February 13, 2017, a continuation of the canon for Wings. Three new songs were added to the track listing, with "Spring Day" and "Not Today" promoted as the lead singles.

Both albums received positive reviews from critics. They sold a combined 1.8 million physical copies worldwide, the group's highest record sales at the time. This earned BTS the title of "million sellers" due to the outstanding financial reception. According to Gaon Chart, Wings was the best-selling album of 2016 in Korea.

== Background and release ==
On August 31, 2016 Big Hit Entertainment released a statement announcing BTS's third global official fan club concert where they would perform new material for the first time. From September 4 to 13 Big Hit Entertainment released a series of short films for each member to promote the upcoming album. The short films started with Jungkook's "Begin", followed by Jimin's "Lie", V's "Stigma", Suga's "First Love", RM's "Reflection", J-Hope's "Mama", and ended with Jin's "Awake".

=== Wings ===
Wings physical cover (From top, left to right): W, I, N, and G versions

On September 25, BTS released a comeback trailer on YouTube, featuring member J-Hope rapping solo. The video depicted a boy's mind meeting a devil called 'temptation'. From September 28 to October 4 Big Hit Entertainment released concept photos of the album on official Instagram, Twitter, and Facebook pages revealing the album will be available in four physical versions designated: W, I, N and G. The album's track list was then released on October 5 on the official website and Twitter account. A music video teaser was also released on October 7 on YouTube, indicating "Blood Sweat & Tears" would be the lead single. Big Hit Entertainment lastly revealed the design and details of the physical album which would include a photobook, polaroid, mini standee and poster.

During the press conference for the release of the album, leader RM explained, "The harder a temptation is to resist, the more you think about it and vacillate. That uncertainty is part of the process of growing. 'Blood Sweat & Tears' is a song that shows how one thinks, chooses, and grows." Symbolism such as the 'wings' were representations of growth, with Suga adding, "The song relays an optimistic determination to use our wings to go far, even if we are met with temptations in life." Jungkook explained during the group's preview show on V Live, that his solo track, "Begin", was about his journey to Seoul and meeting the BTS members. V described his song, "Stigma", as "a song under the neo-soul genre". J-Hope described his song, "MAMA", as unforgettable, as it was about his childhood emotions for his mother. "Awake" was Jin's first experience in co-composition. RM revealed the 14th track, "Two! Three! (Still Wishing For Better Days)" ("둘! 셋! (그래도 좋은 날이 더 많기를)") was the first official fan song. The album credits Kevin Moore as co-writer and co-producer.

Wings combined the themes of youth presented in their previous "youth series" with temptation and adversity and, for the first time as a major group effort, included seven solo tracks that demonstrated each member's individual strengths as independent musicians.

=== You Never Walk Alone ===
On November 18, 2016 Big Hit Entertainment released a teaser trailer for an upcoming concert tour of Wings while revealing the ticketing schedule with ticket sales starting on December 21. They later announced BTS would be back on February 13, 2017 with part two of Wings. On February 2 and 3 concept photos were released on the group's official Instagram, Facebook, and Twitter accounts, indicating that the physical album would be available in two versions, designated 'Left' and 'Right'. The track list was then released on BTS' official homepage and Twitter account on February 7, revealing the track "Outro: Wings" as a remake from their previous album. A music video teaser was released on YouTube on February 10 hinting at the new lead single, "Spring Day". They also released the design and details of the physical album, accompanied by a photobook, photocard, mini standee, and poster. On February 11, the second music video teaser was released on YouTube, which indicated that "Not Today" was another single from the album.

You Never Walk Alone is a continuation of Wings and contains stories that were not included in the previous album. The album also contains messages of hope and consolation meant to heal the youth of the generation.

== Music videos ==
=== Wings ===
A music video for "Blood Sweat & Tears" was released October 10, 2016 after a month of promotional buildup. The music video tied in heavily with literary, philosophical, and artistic allusions of Hermann Hesse's coming of age novel, Demian. The music video was produced and directed by Lumpens and GDW.

=== You Never Walk Alone ===
On February 12, 2017, the official music video for "Spring Day" was released. The song delivers a message about never losing hope while waiting to be reunited with an estranged friend. "Spring Day" is an alternative hip-hop song with the essence of British rock and electronic music. The main melody was written by RM. The video was produced and directed by frequent BTS collaborator Lumpens (YongSeok Choi) and GDW.

On February 19 the official music video for "Not Today" was released on YouTube. "Not Today" is an addictive moombahton track and the music video features a powerful moombahton dance performance. The video was produced and directed by GDW. A week later BTS released a second music video for "Not Today", with a dance choreographed by Keone Madrid.

== Promotions ==
=== Wings ===
On October 9, 2016 BTS held a comeback preview show on Naver V LIVE. The next day, they held a 'Wings Showcase' for the release of the studio album at Lotte Hotel in Seoul, Korea. BTS also promised to have new songs at upcoming concerts. Promotion on local music programs continued for a month, starting with Mnet's M! Countdown on October 13 where they performed three songs: the lead single, "Am I Wrong" and "21st Century Girl" the first week. On November 12, the BTS 3RD Muster [ARMY.ZIP +] concert was held with BTS performing Wings comeback releases for the first time.

=== You Never Walk Alone ===
On February 12, 2017 BTS held a comeback preview show on Naver V LIVE. Starting February 18 BTS held 2017 BTS Live Trilogy Episode III: The Wings Tour in support of their album, having shows in South Korea, the Americas, and various Asian countries. A week of broadcast promotion began on February 23 with singles "Spring Day" and "Not Today" performed on Mnet's M! Countdown. "Outro: Wings" had been deemed unfit for broadcast by KBS.

== Commercial performance ==
=== Wings ===
Wings pre-orders reached 500,000 copies on its first week, 200,000 more than BTS' previous album, The Most Beautiful Moment in Life, Part 2. "Blood Sweat & Tears" then broke the record for fastest K-pop music video to reach 10 million views. Billboard stated that it was the most-viewed K-pop video in America in the month of October 2016.

Shortly after release, the group achieved an 'all-kill', simultaneously holding the No. 1 position on all major South Korean music charts. The album's lead single, "Blood Sweat & Tears", became the group's first domestic No. 1 hit on Gaon Digital Chart. All 15 songs on the album charted in the top 50 of the Gaon Digital Chart, garnering over one million digital downloads and over eight million streams. Thirteen of the album's songs charted on Billboard World Digital Songs with the lead single debuted at No. 1 on its first week.

The album charted on the Billboard 200 at No. 26, making it the highest-charting and best-selling K-pop album on the chart at the time, surpassing 2NE1's Crush and Exo's Exodus respectively, with 16,000 copies sold and 11,000 in traditional album sales. It spent more than one week on the chart making BTS the first K-pop act to achieve the feat with a single album. In two weeks it sold 100,000 copies, nearly 13,000 of which were in traditional album sales. BTS also topped Billboard World Albums for the week of October 29. In its third week, it moved another 1,000 copies, spending another week as the highest-selling K-pop album in America. BTS made their debut in the Billboard Top Album Sales Chart on the week of October 29, 2016 with a peak position at No. 20. It was the first Korean album listed on the UK Albums Chart, at No. 62. It was listed at No. 6 on the World Album Year End Chart and was selected as the Best Kpop Album of 2016 by Billboard. It broke South Korea album chart records as the highest-selling album on its Gaon Monthly Chart and was the highest-selling album since the Gaon chart's inception. In addition to being Gaon's best-selling album of the year, it won Record of the Year at the 26th Seoul Music Awards, Album of the Year (4th quarter) at the 6th Gaon Chart Music Awards and Disk Bonsang or Album Division at the 31st Golden Disc Awards.

=== You Never Walk Alone ===
You Never Walk Alone received a record-breaking pre-order of over 700,000 physical copies, the highest pre-order record for the first half of 2017. The "Spring Day" music video broke the record set by "Blood Sweat & Tears" for the fastest K-pop music video to reach 10 million views, which was then broken by the music video for "Not Today". BTS also set a record for shortest time between consecutive concerts at the large Gocheok Sky Dome venue for 2017 BTS Live Trilogy Episode III: The Wings Tour in Seoul. Tickets for both domestic and international concerts on the tour sold out within minutes.

Within an hour of its midnight release, lead single "Spring Day" reached the top spot on eight online music streaming sites, including Melon, Mnet, Genie and Naver Music. The high demand caused an error on Melon where it temporarily became inaccessible. It earned BTS four first-place trophies on local music program awards. "Spring Day" debuted at No. 15 on the Billboard Bubbling Under Hot 100 and No. 1 on the Billboard World Digital Songs, selling 14,000 digital downloads. Together with "Not Today", "Outro: Wings" and "A Supplementary Story: You Never Walk Alone", the four new tracks held the top four slots on the World Digital Songs chart making BTS the first K-pop act to do so. "Not Today" surpassed "Spring Day" in the following week, rising up the chart to No. 1 and recording BTS' fourth entry as chart-toppers on the ranking.

The album You Never Walk Alone debuted at No. 61 on the Billboard 200, extending BTS' record as the K-pop act with the most entries on the chart. This eventually led to their 6th entry on the chart, unique for a Korean artist at the time. The album debuted at No. 1 on Billboard World Albums, giving BTS their third chart-topper album on that ranking. Upon its release in China, the album sold 144,400 in the first week on QQ Music, and charted at No. 1 on the best-selling albums of the week. In South Korea, the album charted at No. 1 on Gaon Weekly Chart with 373,750 albums sold in one week, earning the band their 7th weekly chart-topper and breaking the record set by Wings. It also topped February Gaon Monthly Chart, the highest physical sales for the first half of 2017.

== Critical reception ==
Professional ratings
Review scores
Source	Rating
AllMusic	4/5 stars
IZM	3/5 stars

Wings received mostly positive reviews from critics, for tackling social issues such as mental health and female empowerment. Jeff Benjamin of Fuse wrote, "The rising K-pop phenoms' new album is doing it right by letting their seven members spread their artistic wings and solidifying their individual identities—all while keeping the band identity strong as ever." Fuse listed Wings at No. 8 on their list of the 20 Best Albums of 2016, praising the album's "vulnerable and honest song material" and diverse tracks. The album also topped Billboard's "10 Best K-Pop Albums 2016" list. Billboard branded the album an "accomplishment all its own", praising BTS' involvement in co-writing and producing and the compositional choice to allow each member a solo song reflecting individual musical styles, showing that "they can compete with top pop acts." The music chart also described BTS' music as "forward-thinking", referring to the tropical house and EDM sounds on the album and lyrics that discussed the darker side of mental health issues.

"With Wings, the 2016 follow-up to BTS' spectacular breakthrough The Most Beautiful Moment in Life, the group channeled their ambitions for global domination, proving that they could remain true to their hip-hop roots while exploring new soundscapes.

— Joshua Calixto from Billboard

Rolling Stone's Nick Murray named Wings "one of the most conceptually and sonically ambitious pop albums of 2016."Billboard's Tamar Herman wrote an article on the repackaged album You Never Walk Alone, in which she described the single "Spring Day" as an "alt hip hop song infused with rock instrumentals and EDM synths" combining the rap elements for which BTS has become known with "dreamy vocals and yearning lyrics." Herman called "Not Today" the dual single counterpart to "Spring Day", a power anthem for "all the underdogs in the world." "Spring Day" ranked No. 1 on Dazed Digital's "20 Best K-Pop Songs of 2017" list, and the magazine described the song as "an intelligent, compelling and elegantly restrained study of loss and longing" that "deliberately avoids cliché pomp and drama". Wings was included in Billboard's list of "The 25 Greatest K-Pop Albums of the 2010s".

== Accolades ==
Awards and nominations
Ceremony	Year	Category	Nominated work	Result	Ref.
Hanteo Awards	2016	Album Award	Wings	Won	
Gaon Chart Music Awards	2017	Album of the Year – 4th Quarter	Wings	Won	
Golden Disc Awards	2017	Album Bonsang	Wings	Won	
Golden Disc Awards	2017	Album Daesang	Wings	Nominated	
Hallyu K Fans' Choice Awards	2016	Best Album	Wings	Won	
Seoul Music Awards	2017	Album of the year	Wings	Won	
Soompi Awards	2017	Album of the year	Wings	Won	
Hanteo Awards	2017	Album Award	You Never Walk Alone	Won	
Melon Music Awards	2017	Album of the Year	You Never Walk Alone	Nominated	
Gaon Chart Music Awards	2018	Album of the Year – 1st Quarter	You Never Walk Alone	Won	
Soompi Awards	2018	Album of the Year	You Never Walk Alone	Won	

Critic lists
Publication	List	Version	Rank	Ref.
AllMusic	AllMusic's Favorite Pop Albums of 2016	Wings	No order	
Billboard	10 Best K-pop Albums of 2016: Critic's Picks	Wings	1	
Billboard	The 25 Greatest K-pop Albums of the 2010s	Wings	20	
Fuse	The 20 Best Albums of 2016	Wings	8	
Genius	100 Best Albums of the 2010s	You Never Walk Alone	80	

== Track listing ==
No.	Title	Writer(s)	Producer(s)	Length
1.	"Intro: Boy Meets Evil" (solo by J-Hope)	Pdogg; J-Hope; RM	Pdogg	2:01
2.	"피 땀 눈물" (Pi ttam nunmul / Blood Sweat & Tears)	Pdogg; RM; Suga; J-Hope; "Hitman" Bang; Kim Do-hoon	Pdogg	3:37
3.	"Begin" (solo by Jungkook)	Tony Esterly; David Quinones; RM	Tony Esterly	3:49
4.	"Lie" (solo by Jimin)	Docskim; Sumin; "Hitman" Bang; Jimin; Pdogg	DOCSKIM	3:35
5.	"Stigma" (solo by V)	Philtre; V; Slow Rabbit; "Hitman" Bang	Philtre	3:36
6.	"First Love" (solo by Suga)	Miss Kay; Suga	Miss Kay; Suga	3:09
7.	"Reflection" (solo by RM)	RM; Slow Rabbit	RM; Slow Rabbit	3:53
8.	"MAMA" (solo by J-Hope)	Primary; Pdogg; J-Hope	Primary; Pdogg	3:32
9.	"Awake" (solo by Jin)	Slow Rabbit; Jin; J-Hope; June; Pdogg; RM; "Hitman" Bang	Slow Rabbit	3:46
10.	"Lost" (song by Jungkook, V, Jimin, Jin)	Pdogg; Supreme Boi; Peter Ibsen; Richard Rawson; Lee Paul Williams; RM; June	Pdogg	4:01
11.	"BTS Cypher 4" (song by RM, J-Hope, Suga)	Chris 'Tricky' Stewart; Medor J. Pierre; RM; J-Hope; Suga	Chris 'Tricky' Stewart; Medor J. Pierre	4:54
12.	"Am I Wrong"	Keb' Mo'; Sam Klempner; James Reynolds; Josh Wilkinson; RM; Supreme Boi; Gaeko; Pdogg; Adora	Keb' Mo'; Sam Klempner; James Reynolds; Josh Wilkinson	3:33
13.	"21세기 소녀" (21-segi sonyeo / 21st Century Girl)	Pdogg; "Hitman" Bang; RM; Supreme Boi	Pdogg	3:12
14.	"둘! 셋! (그래도 좋은 날이 더 많기를)" (Dul! Set! [Geuraedo jo-eun nari deo mankireul] / Two! Three! [Still Wishing For Better Days])	Slow Rabbit; Pdogg; "Hitman" Bang; RM; J-Hope; Suga	Slow Rabbit; Pdogg	4:32
15.	"Interlude: Wings"	Pdogg; Adora; RM; J-Hope; Suga	Pdogg	2:24
Total length:				53:34

You Never Walk Alone
No.	Title	Writer(s)	Producer(s)	Length
15.	"봄날" (Bomnal / Spring Day)	Pdogg; RM; Adora; "Hitman" Bang; Arlissa Ruppert; Peter Ibsen; Suga	Pdogg	4:34
16.	"Not Today"	Pdogg; "Hitman" Bang; RM; Supreme Boi; June	Pdogg	3:51
17.	"Outro: Wings"	Pdogg; Adora; RM; J-Hope; Suga	Pdogg	3:45
18.	"A Supplementary Story: You Never Walk Alone"	Pdogg; "Hitman" Bang; RM; Suga; J-Hope; Supreme Boi	Pdogg	2:36
Total length:				65:56

Notes

- "Am I Wrong" is the remake of the 1994 song by Keb' Mo.
- "Outro: Wings" is the extended version of "Interlude: Wings".

== Charts ==
=== Weekly charts ===
Weekly chart performance
Chart (2016–2020)	Peak position	
Chart (2016–2020)	Wings	YNWA
Belgian Albums (Ultratop Flanders)	72	—
Belgian Albums (Ultratop Wallonia)	149	—
Canadian Albums (Billboard)	19	35
Dutch Albums (MegaCharts)	68	—
Finnish Albums (Suomen virallinen lista)	31	—
French Albums (SNEP)	161	—
Hungarian Albums (MAHASZ)	24	25
Irish Albums (IRMA)	71	—
Japanese Albums (Oricon)	7	
Japan Hot Albums (Billboard)	11	38
New Zealand Albums (RMNZ)	24	—
New Zealand Heatseekers Albums (RMNZ)	—	3
Norwegian Albums (VG-lista)	24	—
Scottish Albums (Official Charts)	55	—
South Korean Albums (Gaon)	1	1
Swedish Albums (Sverigetopplistan)	56	—
Swiss Albums (Schweizer Hitparade)	62	—
Taiwan East Asia Albums (G-Music)	1	1
UK Albums (Official Charts)	62	—
UK Independent Albums (OCC)	16	—
US Billboard 200	26	61
US Independent Albums (Billboard)	9	19
US World Albums (Billboard)	1	1

=== Monthly charts ===
Monthly chart performance
Chart (2016–2017)	Peak position	
Chart (2016–2017)	Wings	YNWA
Japanese Albums (Oricon)	25	—
South Korean Albums (Gaon)	1	1

=== Year-end charts ===
Year-end chart positions
Chart (2016)	Position	
Chart (2016)	Wings	YNWA
South Korean Albums (Gaon)	1	—N/a
US World Albums (Billboard)	6	—N/a
Chart (2017)	Position	
South Korean Albums (Gaon)	—N/a	3
US World Albums (Billboard)	—N/a	11
Chart (2019)	Position	
Hungarian Albums (MAHASZ)	—	97
Chart (2021)	Position	
Japanese Albums (Oricon)	91	—
South Korean Albums (Gaon)	59	60

== Certifications and sales ==
Wings
Region	Certification	Certified units/sales
Canada (Music Canada)	Platinum	80,000^{‡}
Japan	—	57,421
South Korea	—	1,161,834
United Kingdom (BPI)	Silver	60,000^{‡}
United States	—	23,000
^{‡} Sales+streaming figures based on certification alone.

You Never Walk Alone
Region	Certification	Certified units/sales
Canada (Music Canada)	Platinum	80,000^{‡}
New Zealand (RMNZ)	Gold	7,500^{‡}
South Korea	—	1,053,499
United Kingdom (BPI)	Gold	100,000^{‡}
^{‡} Sales+streaming figures based on certification alone.

== Release history ==
Edition	Country	Date	Format	Label
Wings	South Korea	October 10, 2016	CD, Digital download	Big Hit Entertainment
Wings	Various	October 10, 2016	Digital download	Big Hit Entertainment
Wings	Japan	October 12, 2016	CD	Pony Canyon
Wings	Malaysia	October 17, 2016	CD, digital download	Universal Music
Wings	Taiwan	November 4, 2016	CD, digital download	Universal Music
You Never Walk Alone	South Korea	February 13, 2017	CD, digital download	Big Hit Entertainment
You Never Walk Alone	Various	February 13, 2017	Digital download	Big Hit Entertainment

== See also ==
- List of K-pop songs on the Billboard charts
- List of K-pop albums on the Billboard charts
- List of Gaon Album Chart number ones of 2016
- List of Gaon Album Chart number ones of 2017
- List of best-selling albums in China
- List of best-selling albums in South Korea
