= Adora (singer) =

South Korean singer-songwriter and record producer

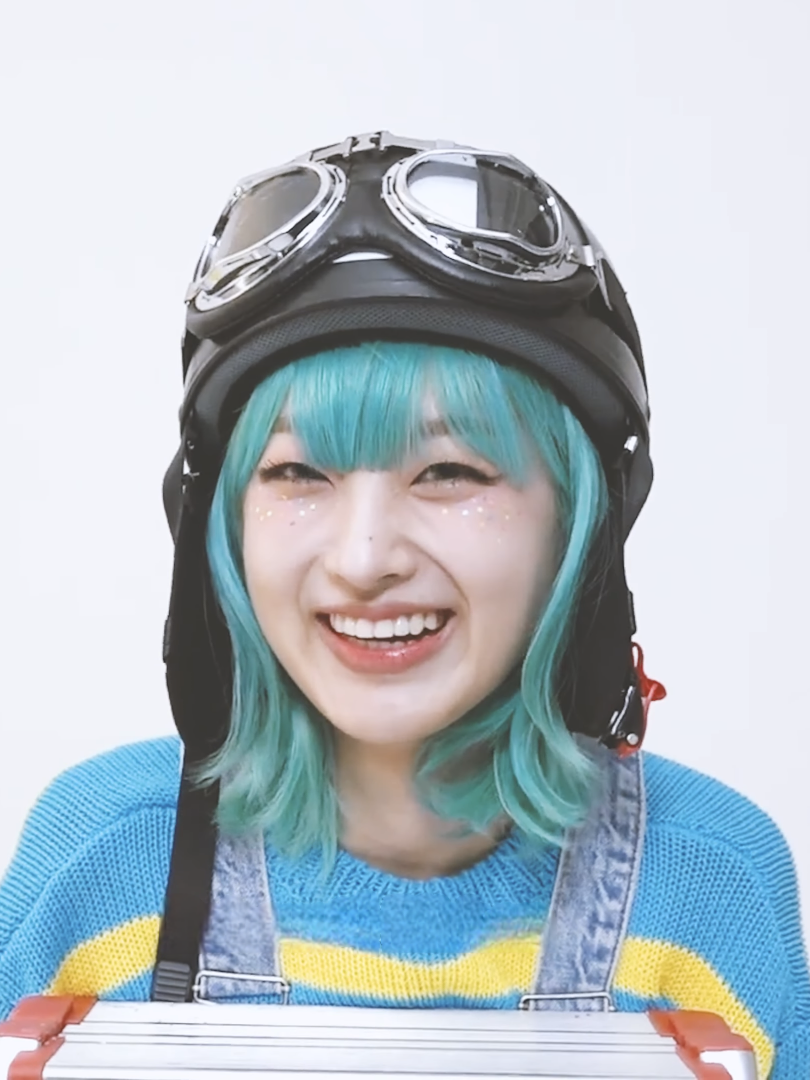
- Adora in 2022
- Born: Park Soo-hyun; September 25, 1997 (age 29)
- Occupations: Singer; songwriter; record producer
- Musical career
- Genre: K-pop
- Instrument: Vocals
- Years active: 2016–present

Park Soo-hyun (Korean: 박수현; born September 25, 1997), professionally known as Adora (아도라), is a South Korean singer, songwriter, and record producer. She made her debut as a soloist on November 5, 2021, under Aura Entertainment with the digital single "Make U Dance", featuring Eunha of Viviz. In 2022, she released her debut EP Adorable Rebirth. Prior she wrote and produced songs for various acts including BTS, TXT, GFriend, Fromis 9, and Chungha.

== Career ==
=== 2012–2014: Early beginnings ===
Adora began singing and writing songs at an early age. One of her first compositions was a fan song she wrote for the band Highlight in 2011, when she was 13 years old.

She joined Stardom Entertainment as a 14-year-old in 2012. She trained with the South Korean band Topp Dogg, co-composing the song "Playground" from their debut EP Dogg's Out, released in 2013. She left the company for unknown reasons and subsequently joined Music K Entertainment in 2014, where she trained with members of the South Korean group The Ark, but did not make it into the final lineup.

=== 2016–2020: Working as a music producer ===
In 2016, she auditioned for Big Hit Music's "Next New Creator", where she made it past the second round, but turned down the offer because she was still a trainee with another company at the time. Nevertheless, Big Hit sent her some tracks for BTS' sophomore album Wings, including "Interlude: Wings", which became her first professional songwriting credit under the name Adora. Among her other earliest works were the singles "Spring Day" and "Not Today" on BTS' repackage album You Never Walk Alone (2017). After leaving her previous company, she joined Big Hit when they invited her to become an in-house producer.

As a producer for Big Hit, she co-wrote songs for TXT and GFriend. Although she had a good relationship with the company, she left the company in 2020 because she felt she wasn't contributing enough creatively.

=== 2021–2024: Solo debut with Adorable Rebirth and solo activities ===
On October 25, 2021, media outlets announced that Adora had signed an exclusive contract with Aura Entertainment. She officially debuted as a singer on November 5 with the release of the single "Make U Dance", in collaboration with Dingo Music. Adora made a spontaneous decision to feature Eunha of Viviz on the single, in order to include a different voice in the song. In December, the Recording Academy spotlighted Adora as one of five K-pop songwriters and producers who "defined 2021" by making a mark worldwide. She was also named by NME as one of several new artists to watch in 2022.

On March 7, 2022, Adora released the single "The Little Name", inspired by some of her childhood memories, including certain people whom she missed from that time. An animated music video loosely based on Antoine de Saint-Exupéry's The Little Prince accompanied the song. On June 1, she released the single "Trouble? Travel!" Adora appeared on KBS2's Music Bank to promote the single, marking her first performance on a weekly domestic music show. On June 3, Adora had a partnership with South Korean street fashion brand Nerdy, becoming a "Nerdist" to promote the NERDY 22SS SUMMER GRAPHIC COLLECTION. In July, the U+Idol Live music variety show Sing in the Green confirmed that she would be a cast member, which premiered on July 27. She released three songs during her time on the show: "Together Forever" featuring Kim Dong-hyun on August 24; a solo track, "The End of Eternity", on September 14; and "Sing in the Green" featuring the entire cast on September 28.

On September 26, Adora released her debut extended play (EP) Adorable Rebirth. The nine-track EP included her three previously released singles and six new songs, including an instrumental version of the lead single "Magical Symphony." She held a showcase for this release at the Ilji Art Hall in Gangnam, Seoul. On the same day, South Korean vegan bag brand Marhen.J announced their collaboration with Adora. In early October, Adora participated in the Mnet survival show Artistock Game, but was eliminated in the eighth episode, right before the semi-final round.

On August 21, 2023, Aura Entertainment confirmed that Adora would join SBS's survival competition show Universe Ticket, which will be premiered on November, as a mentor. She released "I'm Here for You", described as a "healing" song, for the show on December 28.

On September 27, 2024, Adora held her first fan concert titled "ADORA's 1st fancon : Dear Hearts Hotel" at Onmam Theater, Hongdae.

=== 2026–present: Debut with OWIS ===
On March 23, 2026, South Korean virtual girl group OWIS (acronym for Only When I Sleep) debuted with their debut extended play Museum. Adora is hinted to voice a member on the group, presumably Summer since its contributions on the extended play was listed under the former's code on KMCA.

== Personal life ==
Adora revealed that she had thyroid cancer and underwent surgery at 23 years old (Korean age). It became a turning point in her life, pushing her to realize her dream of becoming a singer once again.

== Discography ==
=== Extended plays ===
List of extended plays, showing selected details, selected chart positions, and sales figures
Title	Details	Peak chart positions	Sales
Title	Details	KOR	Sales
Adorable Rebirth	Released: September 26, 2022; Label: S2, Aura; Formats: CD, digital download, streaming	80	KOR: 1,346

=== Singles ===
==== As lead artist ====
List of singles as lead artist, showing year released, chart positions, and album name
Title	Year	Peak chart positions	Album
Title	Year	KOR DL	Album
"Make U Dance" (featuring Eunha)	2021	139	Adorable Rebirth
"The Little Name" (어린이름)	2022	—	Adorable Rebirth
"Trouble? Travel!"	2022	—	Adorable Rebirth
"Magical Symphony"	2022	—	Adorable Rebirth
"Ten Reasons I Love You" (그대를 사랑하는 10가지 이유)	2023	—	Non-album singles
"Dreams" (환상)	2023	—	Non-album singles
"Dusk Twilight" (밤이 되니까) (featuring Natty)	2024	—	Non-album singles
"—" denotes a recording that did not chart or was not released in that region.

==== Promotional singles ====
List of promotional singles, showing year released, and album name
Title	Year	Album
"Together Forever" (featuring Kim Dong-hyun)	2022	Sing in the Green
"The End of Eternity" (우리는 더 이상 우리가 아니었음을)	2022	Sing in the Green
"Sing in the Green" (싱인더그린) (with Yoon Sang, Yoon Ddan-ddan, Stella Jang, Yerin)	2022	Sing in the Green
"Nth Universe" (N번째 우주)	2023	My Reason to Die OST
"Wonder Woman"	2023	Strong Girl Nam-soon OST
"I'm Here for You" (울지마)	2023	Non-album single
"Me, Myself"	2024	True Beauty (Aeni series) OST
"Clumsy" (삐그덕)	2024	A Virtuous Business OST

== Songwriting for other artists ==
All songwriting credits are adapted from the Korea Music Copyright Association's database, unless otherwise noted.

=== Big Hit Music's artists ===
Year	Artist(s)	Album	Song	Writing		Producing	
Year	Artist(s)	Album	Song	Credited	With	Credited	With
2016	BTS	Wings	"Interlude: Wings"	Yes	Pdogg, RM, J-Hope, Suga	No	
2017	BTS	You Never Walk Alone	"Spring Day"	Yes	Pdogg, RM, "hitman" bang, Arlissa Ruppert, Peter Ibsen, Suga	No	
2017	BTS	You Never Walk Alone	"Not Today"	Yes	Pdogg, "hitman" bang, RM, Supreme Boi, June	No	
2017	BTS	You Never Walk Alone	"Outro: Wings"	Yes	Pdogg, RM, J-Hope, Suga	No	
2017	BTS	Love Yourself: Her	"Best of Me"	Yes	Andrew Taggart, Pdogg, RM, Suga, J-Hope, "hitman" bang, Ray Michael Djan Jr, Ashton Foster, Sam Klempner	No	
2018	J-Hope	Hope World	"Blue Side (Outro)"	Yes	Hiss noise, J-Hope	Yes	Hiss noise
2018	BTS	Face Yourself	"Intro: Ringwanderung"	Yes	"hitman" bang, RM, Suga, J-Hope, Pdogg, Ray Michael Djan Jr., UTA, Ashton Foster, Andrew Taggart, Sam Klempner	No	
2018	BTS	Love Yourself: Tear	"134340"	Yes	Pdogg, Bobby Chung, RM, Martin Luke Brown, Orla Gartland, Suga, J-Hope	No	
2018	BTS	Love Yourself: Tear	"Love Maze"	Yes	Pdogg, Jordan "DJ Swivel" Young, Candace Nicole Sosa, RM, Suga, J-Hope, Bobby Chung, Yoon Ki-ta	No	
2018	BTS	Love Yourself: Tear	"Magic Shop"	Yes	Jungkook, Hiss noise, RM, DJ Swivel, Candace Nicole Sosa, J-Hope, Suga	Yes	Jungkook, Hiss noise
2018	BTS	Love Yourself: Tear	"So What"	Yes	Pdogg, "hitman" bang, RM, Suga, J-Hope	No	
2018	BTS	Love Yourself: Answer	"Euphoria"	Yes	DJ Swivel, Candace Nicole Sosa, Melanie Joy Fontana, "hitman" bang, Supreme Boi, RM	No	
2018	BTS	Love Yourself: Answer	"Epiphany"	Yes	"hitman" bang, Slow Rabbit	No	
2018	RM	Mono	"Forever Rain"	Yes	RM, Hiss noise	Yes	RM, Hiss noise
2019	TXT	The Dream Chapter: Star	"Our Summer"	Yes	The Futuristics, Delacey, Jesse St John, Shae Jacobs, "hitman" bang	No	
2019	BTS	Map of the Soul: Persona	"Home"	Yes	Pdogg, RM, Lauren Dyson, Tushar Apte, Suga, J-Hope, Krysta Youngs, Julia Ross, Bobby Chung, Song Jae-kyoung	No	
2019	TXT	Non-album single	"Our Summer" (Acoustic mix)	Yes	The Futuristics, Delacey, Jesse St John, Shae Jacobs, "hitman" bang	No	
2019	V	Non-album release	"Winter Bear"	Yes	Hiss noise, RM, V	Yes	Hiss noise
2019	J-Hope	Non-album single	"Chicken Noodle Soup" (featuring Becky G)	Yes	JINBO, Supreme Boi, J-Hope, Brasa, Pdogg, Becky G	No	
2019	TXT	The Dream Chapter: Magic	"Roller Coaster"	Yes	Sam Klempner, Jacob Attwooll, Supreme Boi, Slow Rabbit, "hitman" bang, Hueningkai, EL CAPITXN, Bobby Chung	No	
2019	TXT	The Dream Chapter: Magic	"Poppin' Star"	Yes	Shae Jacobs, Lauren Amber Aquilina, "hitman" bang, Jeong Su-kyoung, Song Jae-kyoung	No	
2019	TXT	The Dream Chapter: Magic	"Can't We Just Leave the Monster Alive?"	Yes	Wonderkid, Shinkung, Melanie Joy Fontana, Michel "Lindgren" Schulz, "hitman" bang, Joni, Jeong Su-kyoung	No	
2019	TXT	The Dream Chapter: Magic	"20cm"	Yes	Jordan Kyle, Shin Hyuk, Jayrah Gibson, danke, Slow Rabbit, "hitman" bang, Supreme Boi, Hiss noise, Bobby Chung, Joni	No	
2020	BTS	Map of the Soul: 7	"Friends"	Yes	Pdogg, Jimin, Supreme Boi, Martin Sjølie, Stella Jang	No	
2020	BTS	Map of the Soul: 7	"Moon"	Yes	Slow Rabbit, RM, Jin, DJ Swivel, Candace Nicole Sosa, Mikael Daniel Caesar, Alex Ludwig Lindell	No	
2020	V	Itaewon Class Original Soundtrack	"Sweet Night"	Yes	Hiss noise, V, Melanie Joy Fontana, Michel "Lindgren" Schulz	No	
2020	TXT	Non-album release	"Sweat"	Yes	Slow Rabbit, Yeonjun, Revin, Taehyun, Beomgyu, Hueningkai, Soobin	No	
2020	TXT	The Dream Chapter: Eternity	"Maze in the Mirror"	Yes	Slow Rabbit, Yeonjun, Beomgyu, Hueningkai, Soobin, Taehyun	No	
2020	TXT	Minisode1: Blue Hour	"Way Home"	Yes	Wonderkid, Shinkung, Sofia Kay, "hitman" bang, Melanie Joy Fontana, Michel "Lindgren" Schulz, Bobby Chung, NU'MAKER, danke, Joni	No	
2021	J-Hope	Non-album release	"Blue Side"	Yes	J-Hope, Hiss noise	Yes	Hiss noise
2022	TXT	Good Boy Gone Bad	"Ring"	Yes	Slow Rabbit, Yeonjun, Taehyun, Hueningkai	No	
2025	Jin	Echo	"With the Clouds"	Yes	Jin, Pdogg, Yojiro Noda	No	

=== Other artists ===
Year	Artist(s)	Album	Song	Lyrics		Music	
Year	Artist(s)	Album	Song	Credited	With	Credited	With
2013	Topp Dogg	Dogg's Out	"Playground"	No		Yes	Kim Dong-hwi, Kidoh
2020	GFriend	Labyrinth	"Labyrinth"	Yes	"hitman" bang, Jo Yoon-kyoung, Noh Joo-hwan, Sophia Pae	Yes	Noh Joo-hwan, Lee Won-jong, Kim Jeong-woo, FRANTS, Sophia Pae, Carlos K., Kim Yeon-seo
2020	Kim Soo-chan	Soochan Song Party	"Hip"	Yes	Ahn Soo-ji, danke (lalala Studio)	No	
2022	Fromis 9	From Our Memento Box	"Blind Letter"	Yes	Lee Seu-ran	Yes	Slow Rabbit, Daniel Caesar, Ludwig Lindell, Melanie Joy Fontana, Michel "Lindgren" Schulz
2022	Chungha	Bare & Rare	"Good Night My Princess"	No		Yes	Lee Hyun-sang (Artmatic), Choi Ji-san (Artmatic)
2022	Plum	Non-album singles	"Tryna"	No		Yes	SQUAR (PixelWave)
2022	Hyuk	Non-album singles	"Stay for Me" (featuring Seo In-guk)	Yes	Hyuk	Yes	Hyuk, BYMORE, MIN
2022	Xydo	Non-album singles	"Sold Out"	No		Yes	PUFF, Xydo
2023	Silverkuro	Kurodool	"Even If A Huge Meteorite Falls" (featuring Adora)	No		Yes	918
2023	BDC	Non-album singles	"Rest"	No		Yes	Hong Seong-jun, BYDOR ARCHIVE, Kim Si-hun
2023	Jungsoomin	Phasis,	"With You"	Yes	Jungsoomin	No	
2023	Zerobaseone	Melting Point	"Crush"	No		Yes	imsuho, N!ko, Chris Wahle, Ryan Lawrie, Ronnie Icon, Nicole Timms, Andreas Öhrns, Haedo (PAPERMAKER)
2023	Kiss of Life	Born to Be XX	"Nobody Knows"	No		Yes	PAPRIKAA, Lim Jeong-woo, Adam Von Mentzer
2023	Kiss of Life	Born to Be XX	"TTG"	No		Yes	BYMORE, Ondine, Rick Bridges
2023	Babylon	Mood	"Private Time" (featuring Adora)	Yes	Babylon	Yes	Babylon, Kyle Lo, Cog
2023	Seulgi	Unexpected Business 3 OST	"Polaroid"	Yes	Rocoberry, xelor	Yes	Strawberrybananaclub
2024	Universe Ticket contestants	Universe Ticket - Unit Station	"Yummy Yum"	Yes	Nano (Vendors), Yeji, YOUHA	Yes	Nano (Vendors), Yeji, YOUHA, PRNCE (Vendors), Arte (Vendors), Fascinador (Vendors)
2024	Universe Ticket contestants	Universe Ticket - Unit Station	"Dream of Girls"	Yes	Nano (Vendors)	Yes	Nano (Vendors), Louis (Vendors), El Capitxn, Kyto6
2024	Jungsoomin	Non-album single	"Song About You"	Yes	Jungsoomin, Donnie J	No	
2024	Loossemble	One of a Kind	"Moonlight"	No		Yes	YeoJin (Loossemble), Choi Seong-min, Jinsol
2024	Jungsoomin	Non-album single	"Be Like You"	Yes	Jungsoomin	No	
2024	Juto	The Sunrise	"Best Friend" (featuring Adora)	Yes	Juto	Yes	Juto, Brown Panda
2024	Jungsoomin	20	"Aeyo"	Yes	—	No	
2024	Jay Park	The One You Wanted	"Piece Of Heaven" (featuring ISOL of More Vision)	Yes	Jay Park	Yes	Cha Cha Malone, Jay Park
2024	Kiss of Life	Lose Yourself	"No One But Us"	Yes	Wilemijn May, Samson	Yes	Strawberrybananaclub, Samson, Wilemijn May
2025	Millionboy	Broken	"Good Memories" (featuring Adora)	Yes	—	Yes	Younghood, Millionboy
2025	Close Your Eyes	Eternalt	"Close Your Eyes"	Yes	—	Yes	Chicok, Im Jeong-woo, Scott Quinn
2025	Close Your Eyes	Eternalt	"To The Woods"	Yes	Lee Hae-in	No	
2025	Aimers	First Love OST	"Dive Into You"	Yes	Hong Seong-jun	Yes	Hong Seong-jun, BYDOR ARCHIVE
2025	E'Last	First Love OST	"Alright"	Yes	Hong Seong-jun	Yes	Hong Seong-jun, BYDOR ARCHIVE
2025	Jungsoomin	Summer?	"Telepathy" (featuring Adora)	Yes	Jungsoomin	No	
2025	Jungsoomin	Summer?	"Drive Thru"	Yes	Jungsoomin	No	
2025	Miyeon	My, Lover	"F.F.L.Y"	Yes	Miyeon, Ondine, Jinsol, Park So-jeong (MUMW)	Yes	Jinsol, Ondine, Strawberrybananaclub
2026	Owis	Museum	"Museum"	Yes	Paulina "PAU" Cerrilla, Kwon Si-woo	No	
2026	Owis	Museum	"Juicy"	Yes	FLAME, Dion	Yes	LAS, DARM
2026	Owis	Museum	"Fornever"	Yes	toni rei, Lee Hae-in	No	

== Filmography ==
=== Television show ===
Year	Title	Role	Ref.
2022	Artistock Game	Contestant	
2023	Universe Ticket	Mentor	

=== Web shows ===
Year	Title	Role	Ref.
2022	Sing in the Green	Cast member	
