= OWIS =

South Korean virtual idol group

- OWIS in 2026; L–R: Summer, Haru, Serene, Yuni, and Soi

Background information
- Origin: Seoul, South Korea
- Genre: K-pop
- Years active: 2026–present
- Label: AMA
- Members: Serene; Haru; Soi; Summer; Yuni

OWIS (Korean: 오위스; RR: Owiseu; acronym for Only When I Sleep) is a South Korean virtual girl group formed by AMA. Formed in 2026, group consists of Serene, Haru, Soi, Summer, and Yuni. The group is the first to debut under the company AMA, established in 2026 by creative director Lee Hae-in. They debuted on March 23, 2026 with their extended play Museum and the lead single of the same name.

== Name ==
OWIS is an acronym for Only When I Sleep, reflecting the group's theme of being seen only in dreams. The concept "explores the growth of a girl group chasing its dreams across blurred boundaries between fantasy and reality", according to The Korea Herald. Their fandom is called Izz, derived from "stay in the ZZZ zone", referring to the moment when OWIS and their fans connect while they are asleep.

== History ==
In January 11, 2026, OWIS was unveiled during the 40th Golden Disc Awards with a teaser trailer, and official social media accounts were created after the ceremony with a planned goal of debuting in March. The trailer revealed their debut single, "Museum", and attracted attention from observers. The group's members, Serene, Haru, Summer, Soi, and Yuni, were revealed days later, confirming a five-member lineup for their debut. They were the first group to debut under AMA, a company founded in 2026 by creative director Lee Hae-in. In February 2026 the group released webtoon‑style teaser visuals on social media and confirmed their debut for March 23, 2026. During the next months, the group released a series of teaser materials for their debut EP, including the tracklist, a guidebook, tickets, posters, and concept photographs.

OWIS debuted on March 23, 2026, with the release of their extended play Museum, whose title track served as the lead single. They made their first appearance on Mnet's M Countdown on March 26 and subsequently started full-scale debut activities, promoting on other music shows, entertainment programs, and online content.

== Members ==
Although presented as a virtual girl group, the members have hinted at real identities behind their digital personas. Creative director Lee Hae‑in was suspected to be one of the voices, though she has not commented on any involvement. Other vocalists have been suggested to include Lovelyz member Ryu Su-jeong, record producer Adora, former Nmixx member Jini, and former I.B.I member Luri, though it remains unclear which vocalist is which member.

- Serene (세린) – leader
- Haru (하루)
- Soi (소이)
- Summer (썸머)
- Yuni (유니)

== Discography ==
=== Extended plays ===
List of extended plays, showing selected details, selected chart positions, and sales figures
Title	Details	Peak chart positions	Sales
Title	Details	KOR	Sales
Museum	Released: March 23, 2026; Labels: AMA; Formats: CD, digital download, streaming	14	KOR: 18,852
