= Leviathan in popular culture =

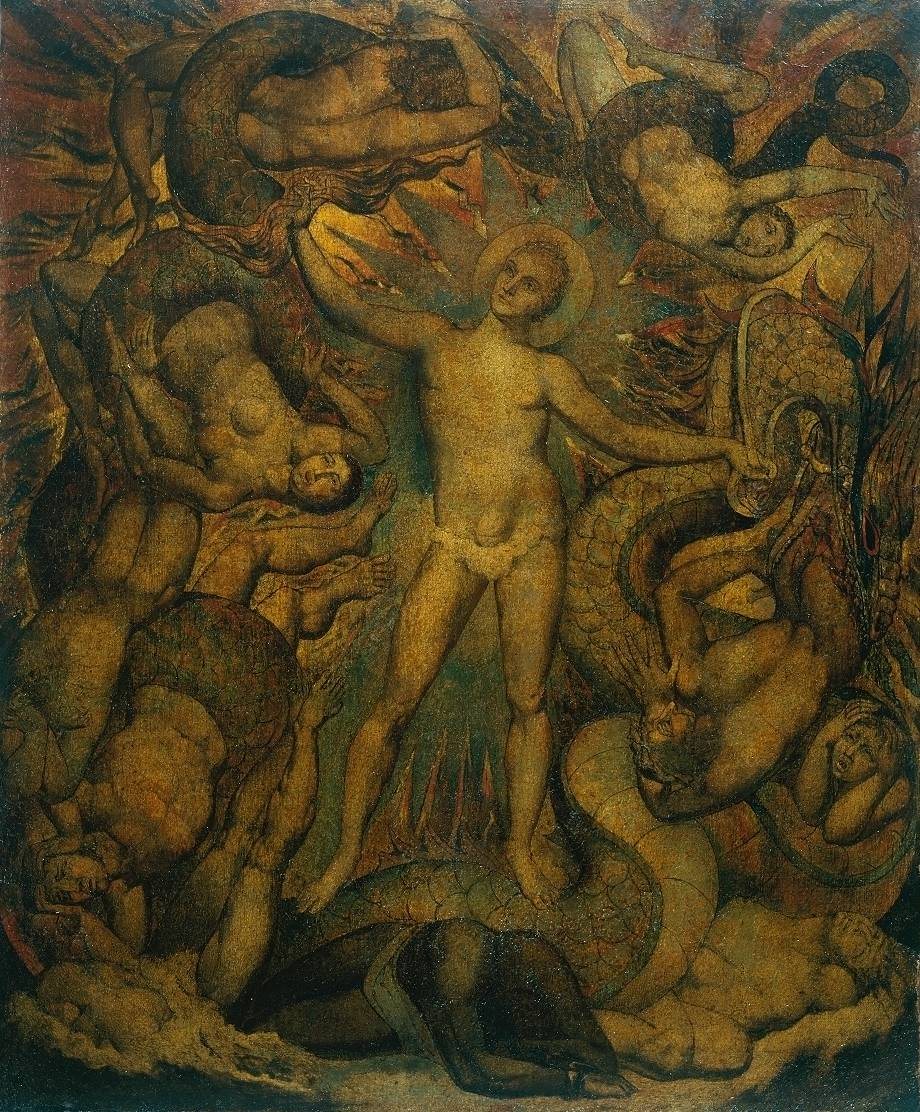
William Blake's painting The Spiritual Form of Nelson Guiding Leviathan, in which the monster is a symbol of military sea-power controlled by Nelson

The mythology relating to this subject arises from Ancient Middle East and Jewish origins. The Hebrew monster Leviathan found in the Book of Job has in particular given rise to many incarnations in popular culture, film, and literature. However, this article includes subjects with no direct connection to ancient sources.

== Origins ==
The Leviathan of the Book of Job is a reflection of the older Canaanite Lotan, a primeval monster defeated by the god Baal Hadad. Parallels to the role of Mesopotamian Tiamat defeated by Marduk have long been drawn in comparative mythology, as have been wider comparisons to dragon and world serpent narratives such as Indra slaying Vrtra or Thor slaying Jörmungandr. However, Leviathan already figures in the Hebrew Bible as a metaphor for a powerful enemy, notably Babylon (Isaiah 27:1), and some 19th century scholars have pragmatically interpreted it as referring to large aquatic creatures, such as the crocodile. The word later came to be used as a term for "great whale", as well as for sea monsters in general.

== Literature ==
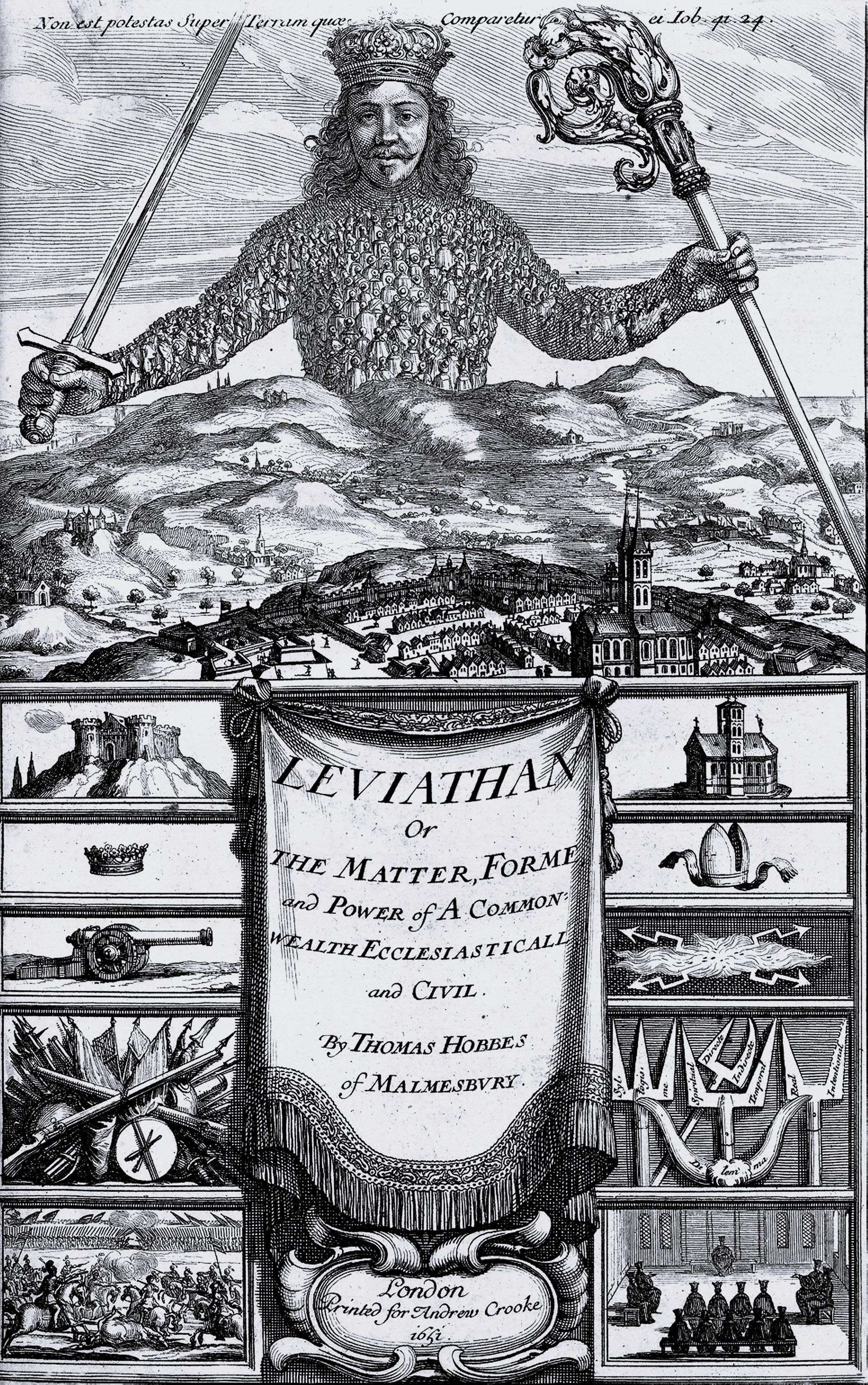
Frontispiece of Thomas Hobbes's 1651 book Leviathan

Leviathan (or more precisely Leviathan or The Matter, Forme and Power of a Common-Wealth Ecclesiasticall and Civil) is the title of Thomas Hobbes' 1651 work on the social contract and the origins of creation of an ideal state.

In Paradise Lost, Milton compares the size of Satan to that of Leviathan:

[Satan] Prone on the Flood, extended long and large
Lay floating many a rood, in bulk as huge
As whom the Fables name of monstrous size,
Titanian, or Earth-born, ...
or that Sea-beast
Leviathan, which God of all his works
Created hugest that swim th' Ocean stream. (Paradise Lost, Book 1: lines 195-202)

William Blake's poem "Jerusalem" has the two monsters Behemoth and Leviathan represent war by land and by sea. This relationship is explicitly seen in Blake's two pictures showing Admiral Nelson and William Pitt [(1759–1806), Prime Minister of Great Britain (1783–1801 and 1804–1806)] included in this display. One interpretation of this design is that these beasts stand for the hopelessness of material nature. The Lord is pointing out to Job the negativeness of his faith so far.

The German poet Heinrich Heine mentions Leviathan in his Romanzaro. A Rabbi tells his Catholic opponent in a debate, the "Disputation", that every day of the year but one, the God of the Jews plays for an hour with the fish at the bottom of the sea. God will one day serve the flesh of Leviathan to his chosen people. The poem gives the recipe that God will use to cook the giant fish, which will be served with garlic, raisins, and rettich.

Herman Melville's novel Moby-Dick (1851) alludes to the Biblical whale, and major influences on Melville were the Bible and poet John Milton, who in Paradise Lost compares Satan to Leviathan – see above.

=== 20th century and later ===
George Oppen 1962 poem "Leviathan". There is a poem by W. S. Merwin with the same title.

The narrative history book Against His-Story, Against Leviathan by Fredy Perlman critically explores the progress of Hobbes's Leviathan, as western civilization, inspiring and defining Anti-civilization theory.

In the Dungeons & Dragons novel Darkwalker on Moonshae, set in the Forgotten Realms world, author Douglas Niles depicts the Leviathan as a giant sea creature that fights the forces of evil on behalf of the Earthmother, an aspect of Chauntea.

Leviathan is the title of a 1992 novel by Paul Auster.

In Steven Brust's 1994 novel To Reign in Hell, Leviathan, depicted as female, is one of seven elder inhabitants of Heaven who conspire to prevent Yahweh from creating the Earth as a sanctuary for himself and those loyal to him.

In Boris Akunin's novel Murder on the Leviathan, Leviathan is the name of a gigantic steamship.

Leviathan is a horror comic series created by Ian Edginton and D'Israeli about the titular mile-long cruise liner, which, on her maiden voyage to New York, disappeared and has spent the last twenty years lost in an endless and lifeless ocean in another world. It was published in the British magazine 2000 AD starting in 2003.

Jim Butcher's series, Codex Alera, mentions leviathans as a species of giant creatures swimming in the river and seas of the Alera realm. In the fourth book of the series, Captain's Fury, the main characters attempt to trick their enemy by swimming past their ship when leviathans are nearby. The leviathans also appear in the fifth book, Princeps' Fury, when Aleran and Canim armies cross the sea on ships.

Leviathan is the name of a 2009 novel by Scott Westerfeld about an alternate history in World War I.

Leviathan is the name of a Soviet-based terrorist organization in Marvel Comics.

Mike Carey's ongoing comic The Unwritten features Leviathan as a central character/force of nature that lies at the heart of the plot.

In DC Comics, Leviathan is one of Talia al Ghul's aliases; it is also the name of a criminal organization she founded.

Leviathan Wakes (2011) is the first novel in the science fiction series The Expanse by James S. A. Corey and was a Hugo Awards Best Novel nominee and Locus Awards Best Science Fiction Novel nominee in 2012. Leviathan Falls (2021) is the ninth novel in the series.

Leviathan is the name of one of the Endbringers in the 2011 web serial Worm.

== Music ==
The American progressive metal band Mastodon named their second album Leviathan in reference to the Herman Melville novel Moby-Dick, on which the concept of the album is based.

Neal Morse, progressive rock composer, wrote a song called Leviathan for his 2008 album Lifeline. The song is based on biblical references to the creature.

The power metal band Alestorm mention Leviathan multiple times in their albums, specifically "Leviathan" from their 2009 album Black Sails at Midnight and "Death Throes of the Terrorsquid" from their 2011 album Back Through Time.

Leviathan is a black metal music project from San Francisco, founded and fronted by solo artist Jef Whitehead.

Swedish electronic band Covenant has a track named "Leviathan" on their album Europa (1998).

Danish rock band Volbeat released a track called "Leviathan" in mid-2019 for their album, Rewind, Replay, Rebound.

American hardcore band Leathermouth (often formatted as LeATHERMØUTH) has a track titled "Leviathan" on their album XØ.

== Film and television ==
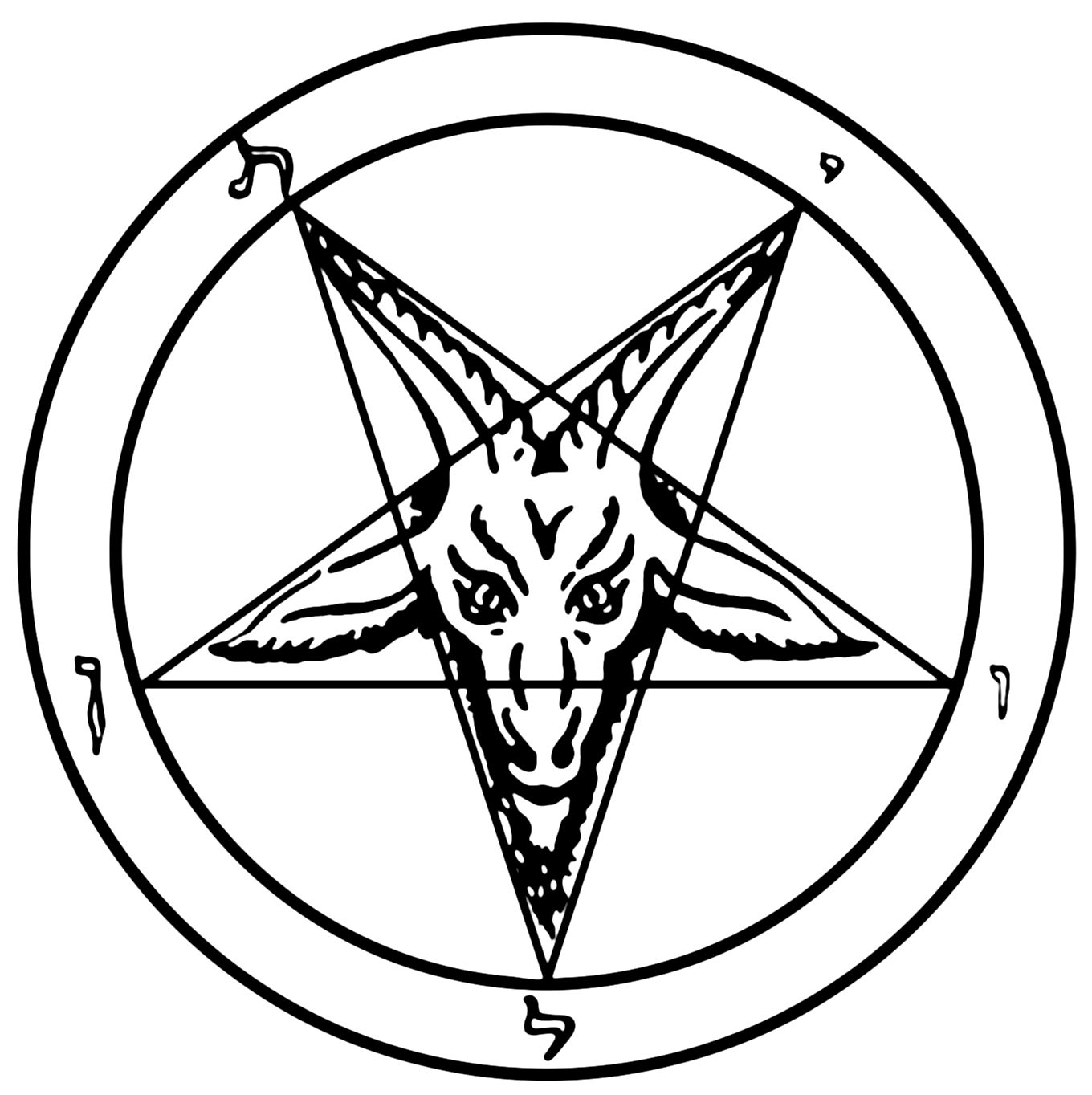
The Sigil of Baphomet, which features the Hebrew name for Leviathan, לויתן

In the television series, Farscape (1999–2003), Leviathans are sentient spaceships, with the ship Moya used by the main characters being one of them.

In the gothic soap opera Dark Shadows, the Leviathans are an ancient race of beings who ruled Earth before mankind came into existence. Their forms were hideous and inhuman, although many Leviathans took human shape after they lost control of the planet, now seeking to return to Earth and reclaim it as their own.

Leviathan is a 1989 science-fiction horror film about a hideous creature that stalks and kills a group of people in a sealed environment, in a similar way to such films as Alien (1979) and The Thing (1982).

In the 2001 Disney animated film Atlantis: The Lost Empire, the Leviathan is a gigantic Atlantean war machine resembling a lobster that guards the entrance to Atlantis. In the 2003 sequel Atlantis: Milo's Return, the Leviathan is still guarding Atlantis, but is no longer hostile to Milo Thatch or his friends.

In the television series Supernatural, the Leviathans are an ancient race of monsters who were freed from Purgatory when the angel Castiel absorbed its entire population. Described by Death as God's original creations, created before angels and humanity but locked away because they proved too dangerous, Leviathans are capable of shapeshifting into human form after contact with their DNA, able to eat virtually anything, and are almost indestructible. They are only vulnerable to the household chemical Borax and being stabbed with the bone of a righteous mortal (Sister Mary Constant) soaked in blood from the three fallen: a fallen Angel (Castiel), Ruler of fallen humanity (Crowley) and the father of fallen beasts (Alpha Vampire).

In the Ninjago episode "The Last Voyage", Zane's father is revealed to be alive, but trapped in a prison surrounded by water and guarded by a squid-like creature known as a Leviathon.

Dave Bautista wrestled under the name Leviathan in the early 2000s for Ohio Valley Wrestling, WWE's developmental territory at the time, before he was called up to the main roster.

In the television series Elementary, the episode "The Leviathan" features the titular location, an impossible to crack bank vault.

In the television series Red Dwarf, the season seven episode "Epideme" features a ship called the Leviathan, which the Red Dwarf crew discover buried in the middle of an ice planetoid.

In the television series Agent Carter, set in the Marvel Cinematic Universe, Leviathan is a callsign of the possible head of the enemy operation.

In the DC Comics-based series Supergirl, Leviathan appears as a criminal organization.

Leviathan is a 2014 film by the Russian director Andrey Zvyagintsev.

In the 2016 television series Legends of Tomorrow, Vandal Savage uses a giant robot created from Ray Palmer's technologies known as the Leviathan to crush rebellion forces. Palmer grows to the same size as the robot to battle it.

In the 2019 Monsterverse film Godzilla: King of the Monsters, a Titan named Leviathan is contained in Outpost 49, situated in Loch Ness. Job 41:12-34 appears in the beginning of the epilogue of the film's novelization, in reference to the physiological similarities between Godzilla and Leviathan as described by the passage.

In the series Smallville, a sonar weapon called Leviathan was created by LuthorCorp for the Pentagon. It emitted focused sound waves powerful enough to rip submarines in half. Experiments were conducted by Lex Luthor, killing nearby marine life in the process.

In Hellbound: Hellraiser II, the entity Leviathan, in the shape of a gigantic, elongated diamond, rotates in space above the Hell labyrinth, shooting out black beams which cause Channard to remember some of the atrocities he committed. Julia calls Leviathan the "god of flesh, hunger, and desire... the Lord of the Labyrinth".

The 2020 web series Helluva Boss features Leviathan as the Queen of the Envy Ring. They are depicted as having two heads, each with an individual personality.

== Video games ==
The Pokémon Kyogre is based on a Leviathan.

In the otome game Obey Me!, Leviathan is the third oldest among the seven demon brothers and the Avatar of Envy. He spends almost all of his free time watching anime, reading manga, or in some way consuming media.

Leviathan is a recurring creature in the Final Fantasy RPG series, often encountered as an obstacle or boss, as well as a water-based Summon spell. Its incarnation from Final Fantasy VII appears in Super Smash Bros. for Nintendo 3DS and Wii U and Super Smash Bros. Ultimate on the Midgar stage.

In the game Dishonored, it is hinted that the original form of the Outsider, a mystical figure who grants the protagonist Corvo magical powers, is a leviathan.

In the Mass Effect 3 DLC, Mass Effect: Leviathan, the protagonists investigate a derelict Reaper codenamed "Leviathan" and encounter the ancient aquatic species responsible for the creation of the Reapers, who are unofficially known as Leviathans.

In both the original and the remake of Dead Space, the Leviathan is the first boss battle of the game, fought at the end of chapter 6.

In the first Borderlands 2 DLC Captain Scarlett, the Leviathan is mentioned several times, large skeletons of what could be the creature decorating the land, and a Leviathan is fought as a boss battle.

In Devil May Cry 3, the Leviathan, a gigantic flying whale-like creature, was released into the human world after Vergil and Arkham summoned the Temen-ni-gru tower into the human world to obtain Sparda's power for themselves. The demon is eventually killed by Dante after he destroys it from the inside.

In Mega Man Zero, one of the main characters is a Reploid named Fairy Leviathan, who is a member of the Maverick Hunter organization of Neo Arcadia.

In the game series Gears of War the Leviathan was a species of aquatic animals that lived in bodies of deep water and later on the surface, feared by another enemy, the Locust, who would not go near their territory.

In Skullgirls, Leviathan is a bony serpent parasite who assists the undead character Squigly, having more of a mutual bond than a parasitic one. He often uses fire and other dragon-related attacks to help her in her battles.

Leviathan's Drift is a location in Darksiders. The Leviathan is a massive dragon-like creature that appears in the Darksiders II: Death's Door Comic.

In Subnautica, the Leviathan classification is given only to the largest organisms dominating their local habitat, and is the largest group in the game. Most members of the Leviathan class have either a serpentine body shape or are propelled by tentacles, similar to many classical depictions of Leviathans.

In Destiny, the Leviathan is a massive undersea creature who unsuccessfully tries to prevent one of the game's main antagonistic races, the Hive, from becoming corrupted. In its sequel Destiny 2, the Leviathan is the name of a massive, world-eating starship which houses the former Cabal Emperor and is also the name of the game's first Raid, which takes place upon said ship.

A Leviathan built from an agglomeration of souls drowned in the Styx appears as the final boss of the Wrath area in Ultrakill.

In Infernax, Leviathan is one of the five elder demons that Alcedor must face to gain access to the Urzon Citadel.

In Old School RuneScape, the Leviathan is fought as a high level monster, who has been trapped in the Abyssal Sea for centuries following the God Wars.

In the Metroid Prime series, Leviathans are sentient asteroids responsible for spreading the mutagenic substance Phazon.

== Anime ==
In both the manga and anime versions of Fullmetal Alchemist, Leviathan is the demon representation of Envy, one of the seven deadly sins.

In the Yu-Gi-Oh! anime series, the "Great Leviathan" is an antagonistic force, a gigantic serpent dragon responsible for the destruction of Atlantis.

The Digimon Leviamon is based upon the Leviathan. He is depicted as a giant red alligator, and is one of the Seven Great Demon Lords, amongst them representing the sin of envy. Leviathan is also the main antagonist of Digimon Universe: App Monsters.

In the light novel and anime Gosick, Leviathan is the name of a famous alchemist whose true life and fate is one of the main mysteries of the story.

In Reborn!, the character Leviathan represents the sin Envy.

In Leviathan ~The Last Defense~, Leviathan, pronounced Leviatan, is the name of one of the main protagonists. She is a Water-affiliated mage that can transform into a human/dragon hybrid. Her two companions, Bahamut and Jörmungandr, are also named after mythical aquatic monsters and can transform into human/dragon hybrids; they are affiliated with Fire and Earth, respectively.

In High School DxD, Leviathan is one of the Four Devil Kings, who is in charge of foreign affairs for the Devils.

== Other ==
One of the newest roller coasters (also the tallest in Canada) at the Canada's Wonderland amusement park is called the Leviathan.

In the SCP Foundation mythos, SCP-169 is a massive marine arthropod 2,000 to 8,000 km (1,200 to 5,000 mi) in length, historically known as the Leviathan. The creature, which resembles an archipelago when viewed by sailors at sea level, lives in the South Atlantic Ocean and possibly the Drake Passage, and was responsible for the Bloop.

In the 3.5 edition supplement Elder Evils for Dungeons & Dragons, Leviathan is one of the abominations profiled, described as a colossal sea monster so huge that it encircles the entire world. It is composed of leftover chaotic energies from creation.

In the tabletop game Shadowrun, leviathans are one of the four types of dragons, alongside eastern dragons, western dragons, and feathered serpents.

In response to the January 2026 North American winter storm, a conspiracy theory emerged on social media that the storm had been manufactured by the US government, or another unnamed power, to freeze a Leviathan-like creature awakening near Virginia Beach. Theorists pointed to the presence of military bases close by as evidence of government involvement. Supposed images of the creature shared online have been noted by experts as examples of pareidolia, where the human brain perceives familiar shapes in random patterns. Sandbars, underwater ridges and shadows were misinterpreted as the emerging head of a mythical beast.
