= The Wings Tour =

2017 concert tour by BTS

2017 BTS Live Trilogy Episode III (Final Chapter): The Wings Tour
- World tour by BTS
- Location: Asia; Oceania; North America; South America
- Associated albums: Wings; You Never Walk Alone; Love Yourself: Her
- Start date: February 18, 2017
- End date: December 10, 2017
- Legs: 6
- No. of shows: 40
- Attendance: 550,000

BTS concert chronology
- 2016 BTS LIVE "The Most Beautiful Moment in Life On Stage: Epilogue (2016); 2017 BTS Live Trilogy Episode III: The Wings Tour (2017); BTS World Tour: Love Yourself (2018–2019)

The Wings Tour, also known as 2017 BTS Live Trilogy Episode III (Final Chapter): The Wings Tour, was the second worldwide concert tour headlined by the South Korean boy band BTS to promote their second Korean studio album, Wings (2016). The tour began on February 18, 2017, and concluded on December 10, 2017, in South Korea. It visited 12 countries including Brazil, Australia, Japan, Hong Kong (city), and the United States. The tour gathered 550,000 fans, making it the band's second biggest tour to date.

== Background ==
On November 18, 2016, BTS released a trailer on YouTube announcing the tour, along with a poster listing the dates for the first two shows held at Gocheok Sky Dome in South Korea. Later, six shows were confirmed in five cities in Chile, Brazil, and the United States.

Tickets for the North American leg sold out within a few minutes. Due to high demand, two additional shows were added for the Prudential Center and the Honda Center. Over 60,000 fans were in attendance at the concerts in Newark, Chicago, and Anaheim. The group went on to sell out their concert in Chile, and became the fastest K-pop group to sell out the Movistar Arena, Chile's largest indoor arena. According to Puntoticket, the Chilean ticket sales and distribution company, BTS' concert was the fastest-selling show in Chile's history, only comparable to Maroon 5’s concert in 2015, selling more than 10,000 tickets in less than 2 hours. On January 13, 2017, BTS announced a second show at the same venue. In Brazil, more than 50,000 fans tried to buy the 14,000 available tickets, which led to protests on Twitter asking for the Brazilian promoters of the tour to move the concerts to a larger venue. BTS sold 44,000 tickets in total across the South American leg of the tour.

On July 27, 2017, BTS announced three finale concerts held in Seoul at Gocheok Sky Dome on December 8–10, 2017. On September 2, 2017, additional dates at Japan's Kyocera Dome were announced for October 14–15, 2017, which were later sold out. It was the first time that the group held dome concerts in Japan since their debut.

== Reception ==
The tour received positive reviews from music critics. Billboard praised the group's "militarily precise choreography". They also complimented the members' solo stages, stating that "The solitary, reflective showcases moved the audience". Bucks County Courier Times wrote that the concert, which "included elaborate dance routines for almost every song, stunning intermission videos and plenty of speeches and antics from the BTS members", was an "incredible experience". Idolator highlighted the band's intricate choreography as well as each member's ability to showcase their respective strengths through solo stages. They concluded, "The Wings Tour is the perfect introduction to the professionalism and pageantry of K-Pop. BTS is in a league of their own and the world is starting to realize it". CNN acknowledged BTS as the first K-pop act to sell out arenas in the United States, praising their evolution in the industry.

The New York Times Magazine reported on the remarkable success of The Wings Tour in Chile, which sold out in record time. It was revealed that "the band’s online popularity had become so entrenched in Chile that tour promoters didn’t even bother with a traditional media push". It was also reported that the audience's screams alone reached "an earsplitting 127 decibels", the loudest ever recorded at the Movistar Arena. Manila Bulletin praised the group's performances and noted the impressive attendance numbers for the show, stating "BTS’ drawing power is no joke".

The Grammys reported on BTS' first dome concerts in Osaka, highlighting that BTS "drew impressive crowds and delivered smashing performances".

== Set lists ==
The Wings Tour on February 18, 2017 in Seoul

Below is a setlist showing what numbers BTS decided to perform.

1. "Not Today"
2. "Am I Wrong"
3. "Silver Spoon"
4. "Dope"
5. "Begin" (Jungkook's solo)
6. "Lie" (Jimin's solo)
7. "First Love" (Suga's solo)
8. "Lost" (Jin, Jimin, V, Jungkook)
9. "Save Me"
10. "I Need U"
11. "Reflection" (RM's solo)
12. "Stigma" (V's solo)
13. "MAMA" (J-Hope's solo)
14. "Awake" (Jin's solo)
15. "BTS Cypher Pt. 4" (RM, Suga, J-Hope)
16. "Fire"
17. "N.O"
18. "No More Dream"
19. "Boy In Luv"
20. "Danger"
21. "Run"
22. "War of Hormone"
23. "21st Century Girl"
24. "Intro: Boy Meets Evil" (J-Hope's solo)
25. "Blood Sweat & Tears"

Encore

26. "Outro: Wings"
27. "2! 3! (Still Wishing For Better Days)"
28. "Spring Day"
The Wings Tour Final on December 8–10, 2017 in Seoul.
1. "MIC Drop"
2. "We Are Bulletproof Pt. 1"
3. "We Are Bulletproof Pt. 2"
4. "Hip Hop Lover"
5. "BTS Cypher Pt. 1" (RM, Suga, J-Hope)
6. "BTS Cypher Pt. 2: Triptych" (RM, Suga, J-Hope)
7. "BTS Cypher Pt. 3: Killer" (RM, Suga, J-Hope)
8. "BTS Cypher Pt. 4" (RM, Suga, J-Hope)
9. "Begin" (Jungkook's solo)
10. "Lie" (Jimin's solo)
11. "First Love" (Suga's solo)
12. "So Far Away" (Jin, Jimin, V, Jungkook)
13. "Lost" (Jin, Jimin, V, Jungkook)
14. "Save Me"
15. "I Need U"
16. "Reflection" (RM's solo)
17. "Stigma" (V's solo)
18. "MAMA" (J-Hope's solo)
19. "Awake" (Jin's solo)
20. "DNA"
21. "Go Go"
22. "N.O"
23. "No More Dream"
24. "Boy in Luv"
25. "Danger"
26. "Fire"
27. "Run"
28. "Blood, Sweat & Tears"

Encore

29. "A Supplementary Story: You Never Walk Alone"
30. "Best of Me"
31. "Path"
32. "Born Singer"
33. "Spring Day"
34. "Outro: Wings"

== Tour dates ==
List of concert dates
Date	City	Country	Venue	Attendance
February 18, 2017	Seoul	South Korea	Gocheok Sky Dome	40,000
February 19, 2017	Seoul	South Korea	Gocheok Sky Dome	40,000
March 11, 2017	Santiago	Chile	Movistar Arena	44,000
March 12, 2017	Santiago	Chile	Movistar Arena	44,000
March 19, 2017	São Paulo	Brazil	Citibank Hall	44,000
March 20, 2017	São Paulo	Brazil	Citibank Hall	44,000
March 23, 2017	Newark	United States	Prudential Center	60,000
March 24, 2017	Newark	United States	Prudential Center	60,000
March 29, 2017	Rosemont	United States	Allstate Arena	60,000
April 1, 2017	Anaheim	United States	Honda Center	60,000
April 2, 2017	Anaheim	United States	Honda Center	60,000
April 22, 2017	Bangkok	Thailand	Impact Arena	90,000 (Note: The score data is combined from the shows held in Asia and Australia from 22, 23, 29 April & 6, 7, 13, 14, 26 May 2017 respectively.)
April 23, 2017	Bangkok	Thailand	Impact Arena	90,000
April 29, 2017	Tangerang	Indonesia	Indonesia Convention Exhibition	90,000
May 6, 2017	Pasay	Philippines	SM Mall of Asia Arena	90,000
May 7, 2017	Pasay	Philippines	SM Mall of Asia Arena	90,000
May 13, 2017	Hong Kong	China	AsiaWorld–Expo	90,000
May 14, 2017	Hong Kong	China	AsiaWorld–Expo	90,000
May 26, 2017	Sydney	Australia	Qudos Bank Arena	
May 30, 2017	Osaka	Japan	Osaka-jō Hall	145,000
May 31, 2017	Osaka	Japan	Osaka-jō Hall	145,000
June 1, 2017	Osaka	Japan	Osaka-jō Hall	145,000
June 7, 2017	Hiroshima	Japan	Hiroshima Green Arena	145,000
June 14, 2017	Nagoya	Japan	Nippon Gaishi Hall	145,000
June 15, 2017	Nagoya	Japan	Nippon Gaishi Hall	145,000
June 20, 2017	Saitama	Japan	Saitama Super Arena	145,000
June 21, 2017	Saitama	Japan	Saitama Super Arena	145,000
June 22, 2017	Saitama	Japan	Saitama Super Arena	145,000
June 24, 2017	Fukuoka	Japan	Marine Messe Fukuoka	145,000
June 25, 2017	Fukuoka	Japan	Marine Messe Fukuoka	145,000
July 1, 2017	Sapporo	Japan	Makomanai Ice Arena	145,000
July 2, 2017	Sapporo	Japan	Makomanai Ice Arena	145,000
October 14, 2017	Osaka	Japan	Kyocera Dome	80,000
October 15, 2017	Osaka	Japan	Kyocera Dome	80,000
October 21, 2017	Taoyuan	Taiwan	NTSU Arena	20,000
October 22, 2017	Taoyuan	Taiwan	NTSU Arena	20,000
November 4, 2017	Macau	China	Cotai Arena	—
December 8, 2017	Seoul	South Korea	Gocheok Sky Dome	60,000
December 9, 2017	Seoul	South Korea	Gocheok Sky Dome	60,000
December 10, 2017	Seoul	South Korea	Gocheok Sky Dome	60,000
Total				550,000

== Box office score data ==
Venue	City/Country	Tickets Sold / Available	Gross Revenue
Citibank Hall	São Paulo, Brazil	15,327 / 15,327 (100%)	$1,207,360
Prudential Center	Newark, United States	22,612 / 22,612 (100%)	$3,348,500
Qudos Bank Arena	Sydney, Australia	11,023 / 11,424 (96%)	$2,054,650

== TV Broadcasts ==
Premiere Date (On-air time [GMT+9])	Channel (Country/Region)	Program Title	Recording Date (Location)
July 17, 2017; 8:00 p.m.	TBS1; Japan	2017 BTS LIVE TRILOGY EPISODE III: THE WINGS TOUR ~JAPAN EDITION~	June 21, 2017; Saitama Super Arena, Saitama, Japan
November 12, 2017; 9:00 p.m.	TBS1; Japan	BTS Dome Concert Performance Pre-program: 2017.10 Close-up Documentary	October 2017; Various locations in Korea & Japan
December 17, 2017; 8:00 p.m.	TBS1; Japan	2017 BTS LIVE TRILOGY EPISODE III: THE WINGS TOUR IN JAPAN ~SPECIAL EDITION~	October 15, 2017; Kyocera Dome, Osaka, Japan
May 26, 2018; 9:00 p.m.	TBS1; Japan	2017 BTS LIVE TRILOGY EPISODE III: THE WINGS TOUR IN SEOUL (Full Uncut version)	February 19, 2017; Gocheok Sky Dome, Seoul, South Korea

== Accolades ==
Awards
Year	Organization	Award	Result	Ref.
2017	Nickelodeon Brazil Kids' Choice Awards	International Show of the Year in Brazil	Won	
2018	Kazz Awards	2017 BTS Live Trilogy Episode III: The Wings Tour in Bangkok	Nominated	
