= Soompi =

Website on Korean pop culture

- Available in: English, French, Spanish, Portuguese, and Thai
- Headquarters: San Francisco, United States (Global); Seoul, South Korea (Korean offices)
- Owners: Rakuten Inc. (Viki)
- Website: www.soompi.com
- Registration: Optional
- Launched: March 1998; 28 years ago
- Current status: Active

Soompi is an English-language website providing coverage of Korean pop culture. It has one of the largest international Internet communities for K-pop, mostly concentrated in news and forums. With more than 23 million fans across all platforms, Soompi offers English and Spanish services.

Since its establishment in 1998, Soompi has grown into one of the longest-running, and most frequently visited websites providing coverage of Korean music, celebrity news and entertainment.

Initially its visitors were mostly Koreans residing in foreign nations, with over 1.2 million people visiting the site. However, as of 2012, the majority of its members are non-Koreans in the United States, Canada, Singapore, the Philippines, and Malaysia, among others.

== History ==
Soompi was founded in 1998 by Korean American web developer Susan Kang, On the early site "Soompitown," Kang personally posted photos of K-pop groups such as H.O.T., S.E.S., Shinhwa, and FinKL, as well as English translations of Korean magazine articles, CD audio samples, album reviews, and more. In the early 2000s, the Korean Wave began to spread across Asia, and as overseas fans discovered Soompi and it gained popularity, a team of volunteers helped manage the forum and post content on the website. In 2006, the commercialization of the site began when Joyce Lan Kim, a lawyer at a Silicon Valley IT company, joined soompi part-time.

In February 2011, it was acquired by Enswers, Inc., a Seoul-based IT venture company specializing in video search technology, and operated as a wholly owned subsidiary of it. At the time of Enswers' acquisition of Soompi, Soompi was recording 1.4 million monthly unique visitors and 22 million page views. When Enswers was acquired by another company, Soompi found a new home with Crunchyroll, a U.S.-based VOD site that specializes in anime, in 2014. Viki acquired Soompi on August 19, 2015. At the time of Viki's acquisition of Soompi in August 2015, Soompi claimed that it had about 7 million monthly users and that the number had doubled in two years.

== Soompi Awards ==
Soompi is also known for its annual Soompi Awards, which began in 2005, and recognise K-pop and Korean drama acts. Winners are selected partially based on fan voting and partially based on Soompi's music charts.
