= Portrait (disambiguation) =

A portrait is a visual likeness of a person.

Portrait or portraits may also refer to:

- Portrait painting
- Portrait photography
- Portrait (literature), a written description or analysis of a person or thing
- Portrait, a page orientation, as opposed to landscape

== Music ==
- Portrait Records, a record company
- Portrait (group), an R&B quartet

=== Albums ===
- Portrait (The Walker Brothers album), 1966
- Portrait (Glen Campbell album), 1968
- Portrait (The 5th Dimension album), 1970
- Portrait (Nora Aunor album), 1971
- Portrait (Lynda Carter album), 1978
- Portrait (The Nolans album), 1982
- Portrait (Doc Watson album), 1987
- Portrait (Lee Ritenour album), 1987
- Portrait (Portrait album), a 1992 self-titled album by Portrait
- Portrait (Sam Rivers album), 1997
- Portrait (Rick Astley album), 2005
- Portrait (Samara Joy album), 2024
- Portraits (Gerald Wilson album), 1964
- Portraits (Graham Collier album), 1973
- Portraits (Side Effect album), 1981
- Portraits (Tri Yann album), 1995
- Portraits (So Long Ago, So Clear), 1996 compilation album by Vangelis
- Portraits (Bury Tomorrow album), 2009
- Portraits (For Today album), 2009
- Portraits (Max Raptor album), 2011
- Portraits (Greyson Chance album), 2019
- A Portrait (Voice of the Beehive album)
- A Portrait (John Denver album), 1999
- Portrait, a 1992 album by British entertainer Des O'Connor
- Portrait -The Music of Dan Fogelberg, a 1997 box set from Dan Fogelberg
- Portrait, a 1971 album by Cleo Laine
- Portrait, a 2018 mini-album by Peakboy
- Portrait a 1997 album by Dan Fogelberg

=== Songs ===
- "Portrait (He Knew)", a song by Kansas, 1977
- "Portrait", a song by Die Monster from Withdrawal Method, 1994
- "Portrait", a song by P.O.D. from Satellite, 2001
- "Portrait", a single by Duke Special from Songs from the Deep Forest, 2006
- "Portrait", a song by Take That from III, 2014
- "Portrait", a song by Mariah Carey from Caution, 2018

== Other uses ==
- Portrait (TV series) (1965), Canadian
- "Portrait", an episode of the Indian web series Picasso

== See also ==
- The Portrait (disambiguation)
- Self-portrait, in which an artist portrays their own image
- American portrait (disambiguation)
