= American portrait =

American portrait may refer to:

- American Portraits, US radio series
- An American Portrait, US television series

== See also ==
- Portrait (disambiguation)
