= A Portrait =

A Portrait may refer to:

- A Portrait (Voice of the Beehive album)
- A Portrait (John Denver album)

== See also ==
- Portrait (disambiguation)
