= Run BTS =

South Korean web series

- Title card used from April 14, 2020 (Ep.101 (Note: The series counts Season 1's "Confession" as one episode, though counting each subsequent multi-part episode as more than one episode. This article counts "Confession" as two episodes. As such, the series' overall number of episodes will always differ by one compared to what is displayed in-show.)) until May 11, 2021.
- Also known as: Run BTS!; Run BTS! 2.0
- Hangul: 달려라 방탄
- RR: Dallyeora Bangtan
- MR: Tallyŏra Pangt'an
- Genre: Variety show
- Starring: BTS
- Opening theme: "Dope" (2015–2016); "Fire" (2017); "Blood Sweat & Tears" (2017–2018); "Idol" (2019–2020); "On" (2020–2021); "Butter" (2021); "Run BTS" (2022–2023)
- Country of origin: South Korea
- Original language: Korean
- No. of seasons: 4
- No. of episodes: 159; 13 specials (Note: Special season + Thailand special + 2 Director's Cut)

Original release
- Network: V Live; Weverse; YouTube
- Release: August 1, 2015 – present

Related
- Run Jin

Run BTS (Korean: 달려라 방탄; also stylized as Run BTS!) is a South Korean variety web series starring boy group BTS. The series broadcasts weekly and has been offered for free viewing on V Live since 2015, Weverse since 2020, and YouTube since 2022. In each episode, the band members play games or participate in a variety of activities that require them to complete challenges, and sometimes carry out secret missions, in order to earn prizes or receive punishments.

Three seasons of the series, comprising 156 episodes, have been released since it premiered on August 1, 2015, with new episodes airing every Tuesday. From August 16, 2022, a special 10-episode season—the first since a 10-month-long hiatus after season three ended in October 2021—was released.

The series returned as Run BTS! 2.0 starting April 23, 2026. A prologue episode was released on April 7, which focused on their discussions regarding the revamped program's schedules and plans.

== Format ==
Each episode of Run BTS features the members of BTS taking on activities relevant to the episode's theme, usually in the form of games, missions, or challenges, with the promise of a prize(s) if they are successful, or punishments if they fail. The members tackle each task as a group, individual teams, or on a solo basis if required. Special episodes occasionally feature non-competitive activities, such as a fashion show, skits, or drama-making. Most episodes are led by an MC, with one of the members filling the role of host for the day, and the production staff who facilitate the missions. Jin and Suga serve as MCs the most often—J-Hope, RM, and V have intermittently assumed MC duties as well. For episodes with missions that require the full group's participation, all members act as presenters.

Episode runtimes initially spanned 8–15 minutes. From the second season onwards, they were increased to 20–40 minutes. In 2020, they were further expanded to a more consistent runtime of 30–40 minutes. Short clips of exclusive behind-the-scenes footage are uploaded after each episode airs. Originally posted on the paid BTS+ V Live fan ship channel beginning in 2017, Big Hit Entertainment moved the clips to its official fan community platform Weverse beginning January 16, 2020, as exclusive subscription-based paid content.

== Episodes ==
=== Series overview ===
Series overview
Season	Episodes		Originally released	
Season	Episodes		First released	Last released
1	11		August 1, 2015	January 5, 2016
2	46	11	January 31, 2017	May 30, 2017
2	46	35	October 3, 2017	July 24, 2018
3	99		January 1, 2019	October 12, 2021
Specials	10		August 16, 2022	February 21, 2023
4	4		April 23, 2026	TBA

=== Season 1 (2015–16) ===
No. overall	No. in season	Title	MC	Teams	Original release date
1	1	"Open"	none	none	August 1, 2015
BTS present a theme song for V app, introduce the new platform and themselves, and discuss their hopes for the show.
2	2	"The Greatest Man"	none	none	August 2, 2015
BTS participate in a three-round competition to determine the "Best Man" among them. They compete in a patience test to see who can hold water in their mouth the longest—without spitting it out—while being tickled, a sexy lips game to see who has the widest mouth, and a cushion version of musical chairs. Jungkook wins two of the three rounds and receives the "Best Man" badge as his prize.
—	SPE	"Run! BTS Live in Thailand"	none	none	August 10, 2015
In celebration of the opening of their V app channel, BTS host a Q&A, participate in a dinner show in which they eat various Thai foods, and play games. This was a live 80-minute special broadcast during the Thailand stop of the Asia leg of the band's 2015 BTS Live Trilogy Episode II: The Red Bullet tour. A six minute-long intro clip for the episode was released the day of the band's concert at the Thunder Dome in Bangkok, while the full episode aired the day after.
3	3	"Theme Park"	none	none	August 18, 2015
BTS go to the Six Flags Great America theme park and complete challenges while on rides.
4	4	"30-second Mission"	none	none	September 15, 2015
BTS play three games in a swimming pool: Jenga (using chopsticks), paper crane unfolding, and emptying half a bottle of Coca-Cola into an empty one. Jimin successfully completes all challenges and is selected as the day's MVP. V, Suga, and Jin each receive penalties and have to drink garlic juice.
5	5	"100 Seconds Sports Day"	none	none	September 29, 2015
BTS compete against the show's crew members in Korean traditional games. They must complete six relay missions in 100 seconds. BTS win and the cameramen receive a drink punishment (water, vinegar, hot sauce and wasabi).
6	6	"Confession (Part 1)"	none	Priest (Jimin) · Penitents (V, Jungkook, J-Hope, & Suga)	October 3, 2015
BTS participate in a skit where they confess (Note: Suga's confession is shown in Part 2.) their sins to "priest" Jimin.
7	7	"Confession (Part 2)"	none	Priest (Suga) · Penitents (Jin, RM, & V)	October 20, 2015
A continuation of the previous episode, the members now confess their sins to "priest" Suga.
8	8	"Silmido Part 1, Survival"	none	Red Team (RM, Jin, V, & Jungkook) · Black Team (Suga, J-Hope, & Jimin)	November 16, 2015
BTS divide into teams and play paintball at a survival game center in Inje, Gangwon-do. Red Team wins.
9	9	"Silmido Part 2, Find The Flag"	none	none	December 15, 2015
A continuation of the previous episode, BTS engage in a treasure hunt for flags hidden in the mountains. The winners will receive dinner coupons. RM, Jin, Jimin, V, and Jungkook successfully complete the challenge.
10	10	"Silmido Part 3, Bungee Jumping"	none	Tall Team (RM, Jin, V, & Jungkook) · To-Be-Tall Team (Suga, J-Hope, & Jimin)	December 22, 2015
Still in Gangwon-do, BTS visit the Inje Bungee Jump facility next, the highest jump tower in South Korea (63m). They must each portray a song title using their body during their jump and the other members must correctly identify it. All members successfully complete the challenge.
11	11	"Silmido, SPY?!?"	none	none	January 5, 2016
At the end of their time in Gangwon-do, the members eat dinner together and try to figure out who the day's "spy" was—they incorrectly choose V. Jungkook reveals himself as the spy and receives a cash prize for successfully completing seven of his nine assigned "spy" missions.

=== Season 2 (2017–18) ===
No. overall	No. in season	Title	MC	Teams	Original release date
Part 1
12	1	"Back to School"	none	none	January 31, 2017
BTS act out a skit in a school setting. Suga plays the role of a female exchange student and the other members attempt to charm her.
13	2	"Cops"	none	Police Officers (RM, Suga, V & Jungkook) · Prisoners (Jin, J-Hope & Jimin)	February 28, 2017
BTS act out a skit where police officers interrogate prisoners for crimes that do not make sense.
14	3	"The Spy Who Returned" (Part 1)	Suga	Older Team (Jin, J-Hope & RM) · Younger Team (Jimin, V & Jungkook)	February 2017
While at One Mount Water Park, BTS must find out who is sabotaging them.
15	4	"The Spy Who Returned" (Part 2)	Suga	Older Team (Jin, J-Hope & RM) · Younger Team (Jimin, V & Jungkook)	March 14, 2017
While at One Mount Water Park, BTS must find out who is sabotaging them.
16	5	"The Spy Who Returned" (Part 3)	Suga	Older Team (Jin, J-Hope & RM) · Younger Team (Jimin, V & Jungkook)	March 21, 2017
While at One Mount Water Park, BTS must find out who is sabotaging them. Jin wins. The other members must do what he says in order to receive food.
17	6	"Snowpark Winter Olympics"	none	none	March 28, 2017
BTS participate in the BTS Winter Olympics. J-Hope wins, followed by Jungkook and Jin in second and third place respectively.
18	7	"Arcade Olympics" (Part 1)	none	none	April 11, 2017
BTS play games at an arcade.
19	8	"Arcade Olympics" (Part 2)	none	none	April 18, 2017
BTS play games at an arcade. RM wins. Suga, who ranked last overall, and Jimin, who ranked last in air hockey, both receive penalties: a balloon is popped right next to their ears.
20	9	"Strike"	none	Jungkook · V, Jimin, RM, J-Hope, Suga & Jin · Jungkook, V & Jin · Jimin, RM, J-Hope & Suga	May 2, 2017
BTS go bowling. Jungkook wins the first round. The other members have to bow to him. Jimin, RM, J-Hope & Suga win the second round. Jungkook, V & Jin have to bow to them and get spanked.
21	10	"The Taste of Korea"	Jin	Suga's Team (Suga, Jimin & V) · Jungkook's Team (Jungkook, RM & J-Hope)	May 23, 2017
BTS attempt to create a meal within an hour. Suga's Team wins. Jungkook's Team has to clean up.
22	11	"Board Game Competition"	none	Team Chica (Suga, J-Hope & Jimin) · Team Go (RM, Jin, V & Jungkook)	May 30, 2017
BTS divide into groups and play board games. RM's Team wins. Jimin loses at Uno and receives a penalty.
Part 2
23	12	"Hangawi Festival"	none	Jin & Jimin · Suga & V · RM, J-Hope & Jungkook	October 3, 2017
For a Chuseok special, BTS wear hanbok, make songpyeon, and play traditional Korean games. RM, J-Hope & Jungkook win. Suga and V each have to eat a random songpyeon.
24	13	"Pet Friends"	J-Hope	none	October 17, 2017
BTS pair up with dogs and compete in canine obedience and agility. J-Hope with Nuri wins.
25	14	"BTS vs. Zombies"	none	Team A (RM, V & Jungkook) · Team B (Jin & Suga) · Team C (J-Hope & Jimin)	October 24, 2017
BTS fight off a zombie attack at Everland while going through an obstacle course and solving puzzles. Team B wins.
26	15	"Game King"	Suga	Team Blue (RM, J-Hope & V) · Team Red (Jin, Jimin & Jungkook)	October 31, 2017
BTS divide into two teams and compete in multiplayer games at a PC room. Team Blue wins. Jimin loses the final race and has to dance "Blood Sweat & Tears" while being doused with water.
27	16	"Secret Agent"	none	Team Kim Seok-jin (Jin, J-Hope & Jimin) · Team A (Suga & V) · Team ‘B’ingsman (RM & Jungkook)	November 7, 2017
BTS divide into groups and play a spy game. Team Kim Seok-jin wins.
28	17	"Welcome to Your First MT" (Part 1)	none	Team Ooh-Ah (J-Hope & Jimin) · Team Ro-Jul (Suga & V) · Team Kim Seok-jin (RM, Jin & Jungkook)	November 14, 2017
BTS divide into teams and play games to win food for a barbecue.
29	18	"Welcome to Your First MT" (Part 2)	none	Team Ooh-Ah (J-Hope & Jimin) · Team Ro-Jul (Suga & V) · Team Kim Seok-jin (RM, Jin & Jungkook)	November 21, 2017
BTS divide into teams and sing karaoke. All teams win and enjoy a barbeque with the food they won. Team Ooh-Ah wins 300g of meat, rice and sausages. Team Ro-Jul wins instant rice. Team Kim Seok-jin wins sausages.
30	19	"A Billboard Hot 100 Promise: Be Each Other's Stylist"	Suga	none	November 28, 2017
BTS hold a fashion show. The members pick out clothes from their personal closets for the others to wear on the runway.
31	20	"The Variety Show of Memories" (Part 1)	Suga	Team Glasses (RM, V & Jungkook) · Team Kim Seok-jin (Jin, J-Hope & Jimin)	December 5, 2017
BTS play games from popular Korean variety shows of the past.
32	21	"The Variety Show of Memories" (Part 2)	Suga	Team Glasses (RM, V & Jungkook) · Team Kim Seok-jin (Jin, J-Hope & Jimin)	December 12, 2017
BTS play games from popular Korean variety shows of the past. Team Glasses wins. Team Kim Seok-jin has to wear retro fashion to the airport.
33	22	"Take Care of Santa"	none	none	December 23, 2017
BTS participate in a Christmas special and complete various missions. J-Hope wins.
34	23	"BTS and Manito" (Part 1)	none	Jimin & V · J-Hope & Jungkook · RM · Jin & Suga	December 28, 2017
Each band member is assigned a Manito and a mission they must complete in secret while playing various games.
35	24	"BTS and Manito" (Part 2)	none	none	January 2, 2018
Each band member is assigned a Manito and a mission they must complete in secret while playing various games. Jimin wins. Suga has to wear Jimin's BT21 costume, and Jin has to wear hanbok to the airport.
36	25	"Kimchi Battle"	none	RM, Jin & V · Suga & Jimin · J-Hope & Jungkook	January 9, 2018
BTS split into teams and compete to make the best kimchi using recipes from different parts of Korea. J-Hope & Jungkook win.
37	26	"Kimchi Wars"	none	Dance Line (J-Hope, Jimin & Jungkook) · Vocal Line (RM, Jin, Suga & V)	January 16, 2018
BTS use the kimchi they created in the previous episode to make a new dish. Vocal Line wins. Dance Line has to clean up.
38	27	"BTS Marble Returns"	none	none	January 23, 2018
BTS play the board game BTS Marble (previously played in Episode 28). Jin wins. RM has to climb Achasan mountain, and Suga has to write a book report.
39	28	"Spin BTS"	none	Golden Youngest (Jin & Jimin) · Cherry RM (J-Hope & Jungkook) · Happy Evangelist (RM, Suga & V)	January 30, 2018
BTS divide into teams and play tug of war. They must pull two other members in order to complete a puzzle. Golden Youngest wins. As the losers, RM gets blurred, Suga has to wear Jin's BT21 costume, and V has to accompany RM in climbing Achasan mountain. Suga carries out his punishment from episode 35 by wearing a Chimmy costume.
40	29	"BTS Golden Bell, Pt. 1"	Jin	RM, V & Jungkook · Suga, J-Hope & Jimin	February 6, 2018
BTS play various games through a Golden Bell-like show.
41	30	"Lunar New Year Special: Only Good Things"	none	Team 2018 (V, Jin & Suga) · Team New Year (J-Hope, Jimin, RM & Jungkook)	February 13, 2018
BTS play a series of Korean New Year games. Team New Year wins. Team 2018 does not get to eat.
42	31	"BTS Golden Bell, Pt. 2"	Jin	RM, V & Jungkook · Suga, J-Hope & Jimin	February 20, 2018
In a continuation of episode 40, BTS play various games in a Golden Bell-type show. RM wins. Suga loses the rock, paper, and scissor game and has to go to the sea. Suga carries out his punishment from episode 38 by presenting a book report.
43	32	"Sports Challenge"	none	none	February 27, 2018
The band members compete individually in an obstacle course. Jimin wins. J-Hope gets soaked with toy hat.
44	33	"Satisfaction of the Five Senses" (Part 1)	none	none	March 6, 2018
BTS play games that test their senses. Suga carries out his punishments from episodes 39 and 42 by going to the sea and wearing an RJ costume.
45	34	"Satisfaction of the Five Senses" (Part 2)	none	none	March 13, 2018
BTS play games that test their senses. Jungkook wins. Jin has to make RM and V breakfast for their journey. RM and V carry out their punishment from episodes 38 and 39 by climbing Achasan mountain.
46	35	"BTS Café"	none	none	March 20, 2018
BTS compete against each other to make the best coffee. Jin wins.
47	36	"BTS Workshop"	none	none	March 27, 2018
BTS learn how to make pottery.
48	37	"Protect the BTS Village" (Part 1)	none	BTS Villagers (Jungkook, RM, Jin & J-Hope) · Blue Villagers (Jimin, Suga & V)	April 3, 2018
BTS play a modified version of the social deduction game Mafia, where the members act as residents of BTS Village and must protect the town by deducing who among them are imposters from the neighboring enemy Blue Village. Episodes set in BTS Village make up the "BTS Village universe" (as explained in episode 146). "Protect the BTS Village" is followed by Season 3's "Reply BTS Village" (episodes 121–122) and "BTS Village: Joseon Dynasty" (episodes 146–148).
49	38	"Protect the BTS Village" (Part 2)	none	BTS Villagers (Jungkook, RM, Jin & J-Hope) · Blue Villagers (Jimin, Suga & V)	April 10, 2018
BTS play a modified version of Mafia. Blue Villagers win.
50	39	"Eve Event, Pt. 1"	Suga	none	April 17, 2018
BTS celebrate the eve of their 50th episode by reacting to highlights from the series' highest-ranked episodes and most famous moments.
51	40	"Eve Event, Pt. 2 & The 50th Episode Special, Pt. 1"	Suga	Frogs (Jungkook & V) · Rabbits (Jimin & Jin) · Dogs (RM, J-Hope & Suga)	April 24, 2018
BTS continue their 50th episode eve event with an award ceremony. Following the ceremony's completion, the episode cuts to the band in an amusement park, where they have to participate in a special celebratory mission.
52	41	"The 50th Episode Special, Pt. 2"	Suga	Frogs (Jungkook & V) · Rabbits (Jimin & Jin) · Dogs (RM, J-Hope & Suga)	May 1, 2018
BTS carry out a special celebratory mission in an amusement park. Dogs team wins and receives a portable ramen cooker.
53	42	"BTS Escape"	none	Sleeping Girl Team (Jin, Suga & V) · Korean Dry Sauna Team (RM, J-Hope, Jimin & Jungkook)	June 26, 2018
BTS divide into two teams and compete to get out of an escape room. Sleeping Girl Team wins.
54	43	"BTS Picnic" (Part 1)	none	none	July 3, 2018
BTS go on a trip and shop for food items they will need. Jungkook wins. Jin and Jimin have to walk the destination.
55	44	"BTS Picnic" (Part 2)	none	RM, Suga, J-Hope & Jimin · Jin, V & Jungkook	July 10, 2018
BTS divide into two teams and compete in outdoor games.
56	45	"BTS Picnic" (Part 3)	none	none	July 17, 2018
BTS go on a trip and play board games. Jungkook and J-Hope lose and have to cook dinner for everyone.
57	46	"BTS Picnic" (Part 4)	none	Team A (RM, Jimin & V) · Team B (Jin & Suga) · Team C (J-Hope & Jungkook)	July 24, 2018
BTS sing karaoke and read poems they have written for each other. Team B wins. The other teams have to clean up.

=== Season 3 (2019–21) ===
No. overall	No. in season	Title	MC	Teams	Original release date
58	1	"BTS Chef" (Part 1)	none	95's (V & Jimin) · Boxing (Jungkook & Jin) · Ref (J-Hope, Suga, & RM)	January 1, 2019
BTS divide into groups and cook Italian food. This is the first episode to use "Idol" as the opening theme.
59	2	"BTS Chef" (Part 2)	none	95's (V & Jimin) · Boxing (Jungkook & Jin) · Ref (J-Hope, Suga, & RM)	January 8, 2019
BTS finish making their Italian dishes and are judged by a professional chef. Ref team wins. Boxing and 95's tie for second place, and play rock paper scissors as a tie breaker. Boxing team wins, 95's have to clean up and make coffee for everyone.
60	3	"Run BTS in Hotel" (Part 1)	none	Team Kim Seok-jin (Suga, J-Hope, & Jungkook) · Team Ppa (RM & Jin) · Team Jji (Jimin & V)	January 15, 2019
BTS divide into teams and play song-related games in a hotel room.
61	4	"Run BTS in Hotel" (Part 2)	none	Team Kim Seok-jin (Suga, J-Hope, & Jungkook) · Team Ppa (RM & Jin) · Team Jji (Jimin & V)	January 22, 2019
BTS continue playing games in a hotel room. Team Kim Seok-jin wins. As a reward, members can yield their future penalties to another person. Penalty used in Episode 82
62	5	"BTS Sauna" (Part 1)	none	Team A (RM, J-Hope, V, & Jungkook) · Team Kim Seok-jin (Jin, Suga, & Jimin)	January 29, 2019
BTS play games at a sauna.
63	6	"BTS Sauna" (Part 2)	none	Team A (RM, J-Hope, V, & Jungkook) · Team Kim Seok-jin (Jin, Suga, & Jimin)	February 5, 2019
BTS continue playing games at a sauna. Team A wins. Team Kim Seok-jin gets splashed with water.
64	7	"BTS School" (Part 1)	Suga	Team Kim Seok-jin (RM, Jin, & V) · Team Jeon Jungkook (J-Hope, Jimin, & Jungkook)	February 12, 2019
BTS act as students in a classroom, led by teacher/MC Suga, and hold an election for class president. Jungkook wins and is given a secret benefit. Benefit revealed in Episode 65
65	8	"BTS School" (Part 2)	Suga	Team Kim Seok-jin (RM, Jin, & V) · Team Jeon Jungkook (J-Hope, Jimin, & Jungkook)	February 19, 2019
BTS use handbells to play a song during music class, play a game to win food for lunch period, and compete in physical games for PE class.
66	9	"BTS School" (Part 3)	Suga	Team Kim Seok-jin (RM, Jin, & V) · Team Jeon Jungkook (J-Hope, Jimin, & Jungkook)	February 26, 2019
The members participate in a debate about mint-chocolate ice cream during Korean class while being sprayed with water. Team Kim Seok-jin wins. For his class president benefit, Jungkook chooses Jin as the additional member to complete the punishment with the losing team: Team Jeon Jungkook, Suga, and Jin must watch the sunset in Incheon.
67	10	"BTS in a Comic Book Café" (Part 1)	none	none	March 5, 2019
BTS play games in a comic book cafe.
68	11	"BTS in a Comic Book Café" (Part 2)	none	none	March 12, 2019
BTS continue playing games at a comic book cafe. BTS lose, but they win 20 comic books in a bonus game.
69	12	"Heart Pang"	none	Team Seok-jin (RM, Jin, & Jungkook) · Jimin & V · Suga & J-Hope	March 19, 2019
BTS play Heart Pang, a board game, in a hotel. Suga & J-Hope win. Jimin and V have to wear a special outfit to the airport.
70	13	"BTS in Toronto" (Part 1)	none	none	April 30, 2019
BTS visit Niagara Falls in Ontario, Canada for sightseeing and surprise missions. They stop at a Korean BBQ restaurant for lunch, then go grocery shopping for ingredients to make dinner.
71	14	"BTS in Toronto" (Part 2)	none	none	May 7, 2019
The members shop for warmer clothes, then return to the rental house and choose their rooms for the night. RM, Suga, and J-Hope share one room. Jin, Jimin, V, and Jungkook share the other.
72	15	"BTS in Toronto" (Part 3)	none	none	May 14, 2019
J-Hope and Jungkook fail the morning mission and have to cook breakfast for everyone. The members visit Lake Ontario. Jimin and Jungkook are the day's overall losers, having accumulated the least points from various missions. Jimin has to jump into the lake—Jin accompanies him because of their friendship—and buy clothes for Jin. Jungkook has to buy food for all of the staff.
73	16	"BTS and Mafia"	none	X-Man (J-Hope) · Pranksters (RM, Jin, Suga, Jimin, V & Jungkook)	May 21, 2019
BTS members are given secret missions and prank J-Hope in a game of Mafia, while J-Hope attempts to make his team lose in all rounds of the game. All members lose. After a random pick between Jungkook and J-Hope, J-Hope has to accompany Jimin and V in wearing clothes designed by Jimin when they return to Korea.
74	17	"Run BTS Drama" (Part 1)	none	none	May 28, 2019
BTS test their acting skills by reenacting lines from famous TV dramas (Note: RM: Fight for My Way; Jin: Lovers in Paris; Suga: Boys Over Flowers; J-Hope: Deep Rooted Tree; Jimin: Guardian; V: Moon Embracing the Sun; Jungkook: Kill Me, Heal Me) before shooting their own short film.
75	18	"Run BTS Drama" (Part 2)	none	none	June 4, 2019
BTS assume the role of both cast members and film personnel (Note: V: Director; Jimin: Standby/timer; Jungkook: Slate operator; Jin: Props master; J-Hope: Stylist; RM: Mental care; Suga: Snacks.) and shoot various scenes for a short film. They must finish within two hours to avoid their bloopers from the recording being aired.
76	19	"Run BTS Drama" (Part 3)	none	none	June 11, 2019
BTS continue shooting their film under time constraints.
77	20	"Run BTS Drama" (Part 4)	none	none	June 18, 2019
BTS finish filming their scenes, and the final version of their short film, titled Dalbang Dorm (달방하숙; Dalbanghasuk), is aired.
78	21	"Food Guest" (Part 1)	Jin	Team Kim Seok-jin (J-Hope, Jimin, & V) · Team Seok-jin Kim (RM, Suga, & Jungkook)	June 25, 2019
BTS play multiple rounds of food guessing games to win lunch.
79	22	"Food Guest" (Part 2)	Jin	Team Kim Seok-jin (J-Hope, Jimin, & V) · Team Seok-jin Kim (RM, Suga, & Jungkook)	July 2, 2019
BTS play three final rounds of food-related games. Team Seok-jin Kim wins. Team Kim Seok-jin has to wear rabbit hats at the airport in front of the press/media.
80	23	"Operation 007" (Part 1)	none	Upstairs (Suga, Jimin, & V) · Downstairs (RM, Jin, J-Hope, & Jungkook)	July 9, 2019
BTS search for cards hidden around Lotte Duty Free, which can be exchanged for chances to play mini-games to win paper hearts. The member with the most paper hearts at the end wins.
81	24	"Operation 007" (Part 2)	none	Upstairs (Suga, Jimin, & V) · Downstairs (RM, Jin, J-Hope, & Jungkook)	July 16, 2019
BTS continue searching for cards, play mini-games, and collect paper hearts. Jin wins and receives a set of gift cards worth ₩1.4 million provided by Lotte Duty Free.
82	25	"BTS VR" (Part 1)	none	Team V (Jimin, V, & Jungkook) · Team R (RM, Jin, Suga, & J-Hope)	July 23, 2019
BTS play four rounds of VR games. At the end of the competition, the team with the lowest score will receive a mysterious punishment.
83	26	"BTS VR" (Part 2)	none	Team V (Jimin, V, & Jungkook) · Team R (RM, Jin, Suga, & J-Hope)	July 30, 2019
BTS continue playing VR games. Team V wins. Jin and Suga play a horror VR game for their penalty.
84	27	"Summer Outing" (Part 1)	none	Team Muscat (Suga, Jimin, V, & Jungkook) · Team Fresh (RM, Jin, & J-Hope)	August 6, 2019
BTS play water polo and go water tubing while trying to answer math questions. Team Fresh wins both games.
85	28	"Summer Outing" (Part 2)	none	Team Muscat (Suga, Jimin, & V) · Team Fresh (RM, Jin, & Jungkook)	August 13, 2019
BTS play recreational games at a lake including water sliding, obstacle racing, and blob jumping. J-Hope experiences nausea and is replaced by Jungkook on Team Fresh. Team Muscat wins the first game, both teams lose the second, and Team Fresh wins the third.
86	29	"Summer Outing" (Part 3)	none	Chasers (Jin, Suga, RM, Jimin, & V) · Defender (Jungkook)	August 20, 2019
BTS play a bonus game of "Defeat Jungkook", ride a boat, and exchange Manito gifts while relaxing and having dinner by the shore. All members win. Suga and J-Hope do not ride the boat due to motion sickness, but join later for dinner and to exchange gifts.
87	30	"Hangul Day Special" (Part 1)	none	none	October 8, 2019
In celebration of Hangul Day, BTS are quizzed on Korean traditional words and phrases. They are awarded stickers based on their performance. This is the first episode made available on both V Live and Weverse.
88	31	"Hangul Day Special" (Part 2)	none	none	October 18, 2019
BTS search for Hangul letters hidden around Oil Tank Culture Park in Seoul, which can be made into words and exchanged for additional stickers. The members simultaneously attempt to tag their assigned target's back with stickers without getting caught.
89	32	"Hangul Day Special" (Part 3)	none	none	October 22, 2019
Still at Oil Tank Culture Park, the members simultaneously attempt to tag their assigned target's back with stickers without getting caught. V wins and is given a motor scooter as a prize.
90	33	"BTS Gayo Returns" (Part 1)	none	Team Kim Seok-jin (V, Suga, & Jin) · Team J-Hope (J-Hope, Jimin, Jungkook, & RM)	November 5, 2019
BTS play numerous song-related games in the same vein as their previous variety show, BTS Gayo. Team J-Hope wins the first two rounds of Gayo.
91	34	"BTS Gayo Returns" (Part 2)	none	Team Kim Seok-jin (V, Suga, & Jin) · Team J-Hope (J-Hope, Jimin, Jungkook, & RM)	November 12, 2019
BTS continue playing song-related games. Team J-Hope wins. V wins the repechage and is exempted from the penalty. Jin and Suga must wear a "trendy" item to the airport.
92	35	"Mini Golden Bell" (Part 1)	V	none	January 14, 2020
BTS compete against each other in quizzes. Jin and Jimin win the first game.
93	36	"Mini Golden Bell" (Part 2)	V	none	January 21, 2020
BTS continue competing against each other in quizzes. Jungkook wins. J-Hope receives a penalty. As the privilege of being the MC, V is awarded the ability to take another member with him when he receives a punishment in the future.
94	37	"BTS Marble" (Part 1)	none	Yellow Team (Suga, J-Hope, Jimin, & Jungkook) · Blue Team (RM, Jin, & V)	January 28, 2020
BTS play the board game BTS Marble.
95	38	"BTS Marble" (Part 2)	none	Yellow Team (Suga, J-Hope, Jimin, & Jungkook) · Blue Team (RM, Jin, & V)	February 4, 2020
BTS play the board game BTS Marble. Blue Team wins. J-Hope, Jin, and Suga carry out their punishment from episodes 90 and 92 by wearing sunflower headbands at the airport upon returning to Korea.
96	39	"Let's Play With BTS" (Part 1)	Jin	none	March 10, 2020
BTS play classic childhood games and eat snacks from their childhood.
97	40	"Let's Play With BTS" (Part 2)	Jin	none	March 17, 2020
BTS continue playing classic childhood games. Jimin wins.
98	41	"Pajama Party" (Part 1)	none	none	March 24, 2020
BTS play various games at a pajama party. Jimin receives a penalty because he is the last one to get dressed.
99	42	"Pajama Party" (Part 2)	none	none	March 31, 2020
BTS continue playing games at a pajama party. Jin wins. RM places last and has to do the penalty with Jimin. The penalty is carried out in episode 117.
100	43	"Florists"	none	Bubble Bowl (Jimin) · Bouquet (J-Hope & Jungkook) · Flower Coronet (RM & Jin) · Wreath (Suga & V)	April 7, 2020
BTS members are introduced to floristry. A guest florist reveals the birth flower of each of the members and teaches them how to make boutonnières. The members then create various flower arrangements of their own design. This is the final episode to use "Idol" as the opening theme.
101	44	"100th Episode Special" (Part 1)	none	Team Baek-jin (J-Hope, RM, & Suga) · Team Seok-baek (Jungkook, V, Jin, & Jimin) (Note: The team names include baek (백), the Sino-Korean number word for 100, signifying the 100th episode of Run BTS. The syllables seok (석) and jin (진) are taken from Jin's real name.)	April 14, 2020
To celebrate the show's 100th episode, BTS members do upgraded versions of missions they enjoyed doing in previous episodes. The members play a quiz about previous Run BTS episodes to determine who will be given the privilege to choose his group members. This is the first episode to use "On" as the opening theme.
102	45	"100th Episode Special" (Part 2)	none	Team Baek-jin (J-Hope, RM, & Suga) · Team Seok-baek (Jungkook, V, Jin, & Jimin)	April 21, 2020
To celebrate the show's 100th episode, BTS members do upgraded versions of missions they enjoyed doing in previous episodes. Team Seok-baek wins.
103	46	"King of Avatar Cook" (Part 1)	J-Hope	Team Kim Seok-yi-gin (Jin, V, & Jungkook) · Team Kim Seok-jin (Suga, RM, & Jimin)	April 28, 2020
BTS members in each team cook food based on instructions given from team leaders Jin and Suga, who are watching from a separate room.
104	47	"King of Avatar Cook" (Part 2)	J-Hope	Team Kim Seok-yi-gin (Jin, V, & Jungkook) · Team Kim Seok-jin (Suga, RM, & Jimin)	May 5, 2020
BTS members in each team cook food based on instructions given from team leaders Jin and Suga, who are watching from a separate room. Team Kim Seok-yi-gin wins. Team Kim Seok-jin is given the penalty of climbing Achasan mountain. This was the last episode aired before the show went on its first hiatus of the year, for the release of BTS' Break the Silence documentary.
—	SPE	Survival Director's Cut"	none	none	May 29, 2020
A 16-minute long director's cut of the survival game BTS played during episode 102 "100th Episode Special" (Part 2).
105	48	"Photo Exhibition" (Part 1)	none	none	June 16, 2020
The members select various clothing items to remake into an outfit of their own design, then draw lots to decide who will wear which outfit. After doing their own hair and makeup, they must take individual, unit, and group photos and vote for the best one; the winner will receive a prize. Suga wins the musical chairs challenge and gets to choose an outfit first.
106	49	"Photo Exhibition" (Part 2)	none	none	June 23, 2020
BTS complete their outfits and draw lots to decide which member will wear which one, then model for individual photoshoots based on an assigned theme. Those not being photographed act as support staff during each shoot.
107	50	"Photo Exhibition" (Part 3)	none	none	June 30, 2020
The members complete their individual photoshoots, then proceed to do unit and group photoshoots. Afterwards, they hold a photo exhibition to evaluate the individual photos. Suga's photo of Jungkook is selected as the winner; Suga receives a framed photo of Jimin photographed by Jungkook as his prize.
108	51	"BTS Game Scouts" (Part 1)	none	none	July 7, 2020
BTS compete against each other in a series of video games at an Esports arena. The overall winner will receive a prize.
109	52	"BTS Game Scouts" (Part 2)	none	none	July 14, 2020
BTS continue playing video games. Jungkook wins and receives ₩500,000 in gift certificates.
110	53	"Dubbing"	none	none	July 21, 2020
BTS dub short scenes from The Lion King, Toy Story, and Zootopia, under the supervision of voice actor Ahn Ji-hwan in a recording studio.
111	54	"Treasure Hunt" (Part 1)	none	none	July 28, 2020
BTS play games as a team to win hints for a treasure hunt at Hyundai Motor Studio.
112	55	"Treasure Hunt" (Part 2)	none	none	August 4, 2020
The members play individually to find clues for the hidden treasure. The treasure is going home early. Jin is the first one to finish. This was the last episode aired before the show went on its second (and final) hiatus of the year, for the release of the BTS In the Soop reality series.
—	SPE	"Dubbing Director's Cut"	none	none	August 11, 2020
In an extended version of episode 110, BTS dub over the short film Dalbang Dorm (달방하숙) created in episodes 74–77.
113	56	"Dalbang School" (Part 1)	Jin	V Team (RM & J-Hope) · Bear Team (V & Suga) · Hyuk Team (Jungkook & Jimin)	October 20, 2020
BTS divide into teams and must pass different school subjects. They compete in Korean and Art classes. V Team wins Korean class, while Bear Team wins Art class.
114	57	"Dalbang School" (Part 2)	Jin	V Team (RM & J-Hope) · Bear Team (V & Suga) · Hyuk Team (Jungkook & Jimin)	October 27, 2020
BTS divide into teams and must pass different school subjects. They compete in Music, Chinese, and P.E class. Hyuk Team wins Music class, while V Team wins Chinese, P.E class, and overall. Hyuk Team has to wear a spangle T-shirt made by the staff. As the privilege of being the MC, Jin is awarded the ability to take another member with him when he receives a punishment in the future.
115	58	"League of Number One" (Part 1)	none	Team A (RM, Suga, Jimin, Teddy, Faker & Cuzz) · Team B (Jungkook, Jin, J-Hope, V, Effort & Canna)	November 3, 2020
BTS and T1 play various games such as "I am ground" and "Toy Hammer Game" at the start as an icebreaker, then divide into groups to sing a BTS song and play "Mundo Dodgeball" & "What The Box?".
116	59	"League of Number One" (Part 2)	none	Team A (RM, Suga, Jimin, Teddy, Faker & Cuzz) · Team B (Jungkook, Jin, J-Hope, V, Effort & Canna)	November 10, 2020
BTS and T1 play various computer games such as Gang Beasts & Fall Guys at an e-sports arena. Both teams tie.
117	60	"Teambuilding Special" (Part 1)	none	none	November 17, 2020
BTS do teamwork challenges and have to complete five out of sixteen to go home. RM and Jimin carry out their penalty from episodes 98–99 by wearing work pants and rubber shoes.
118	61	"Teambuilding Special" (Part 2)	none	none	November 24, 2020
BTS have to complete at least five out of sixteen teamwork challenges in order to go home for the day. They successfully complete five challenges and go home early.
119	62	"Photo Story" (Part 1)	none	none	December 1, 2020
At Samsung Electronics Cafe Camptong, BTS need to find sticky notes and take pictures according to the instructions written on them to earn points. They must also locate seven key cards that open lockers with more sticky notes inside—each card is worth 10 points. As a penalty, the member with the least points must act as a "Genie" to the member with the most points and grant him a wish. Jimin and Jungkook carry out their punishment from episode 114 by wearing spangled t-shirts for the day.
120	63	"Photo Story" (Part 2)	none	none	December 8, 2020
The members review each other's photos to determine the winner. Jin is revealed as a spy—points are deducted from the other members for every picture in which any part of his body appears. V wins with 33 points. Jin receives a special benefit for successfully carrying out his spy mission. Jungkook scores the lowest with only 7 points and must grant V a wish as the "Genie".
121	64	"Reply BTS Village" (Part 1) (Note: 응답하라 방탄 마을; Eungdaphara Bangtan maeul. The title of the episode alludes to the 2012–2016 South Korean television franchise Reply which is set in the 1900s.)	none	Detective (Jin) · Innocents (Suga, J-Hope, Jimin, & Jungkook) · Culprits (RM, V)	December 15, 2020
BTS play a modified version of Mafia, set in the BTS Village during the 1900s: the members act as former residents of BTS Village with the goal of finding who among them broke the ARMY headstone. Episodes set in BTS Village make up the "BTS Village universe" (as explained in episode 146). "Reply BTS Village" is preceded by Season 2's "Protect the BTS Village" (episodes 48–49), and "followed by Season 3's "BTS Village: Joseon Dynasty" (episodes 146–148).
122	65	"Reply BTS Village" (Part 2)	none	Detective (Jin) · Innocents (Suga, J-Hope, Jimin, & Jungkook) · Culprits (RM, V)	December 22, 2020
BTS play a modified version of Mafia, set in the BTS Village during the 1900s: the members act as former residents of BTS Village with the goal of finding who among them broke the ARMY headstone. Culprits win. Jungkook, despite being an innocent villager, is given a last chance and correctly guesses the "Culprits" identities. He does not receive the punishment.
123	66	"Reverse Avatar Cook" (Part 1)	RM	Avatar Cooks (Jin & Suga) · Team 1 (J-Hope & V) · Team 2 (Jimin & Jungkook)	December 29, 2020
A "reverse" version of Episode 103–104: King of Avatar Cook, BTS members in each team give instructions to Jin and Suga based on a recipe video tutorial while they monitor the duo's cooking progress in a separate room.
124	67	"Reverse Avatar Cook" (Part 2)	RM	Avatar Cooks (Jin & Suga) · Team 1 (J-Hope & V) · Team 2 (Jimin & Jungkook)	January 5, 2021
A "reverse" version of Episode 103–104: King of Avatar Cook, BTS members in each team give instructions to Jin and Suga based on a recipe video tutorial while they monitor the duo's cooking progress in a separate room. Team 2 wins. Team 1 has to wear a spangle T-shirt. As the privilege of being the MC, RM is awarded the ability to take another member with him when he receives a punishment in the future.
125	68	"Producer Special"	none	none	January 12, 2021
BTS members become part of the show's production staff for the day. During the first group meeting, after writing down their ideas, the members take turns presenting their ideas to each other and the rest of the staff. During the second group meeting, the members develop plans for one short-term and one long-term project using the approved ideas (chosen by the staff) from the previous meeting.
126	69	"K-HAM Special"	none	Team 1 (V, Jimin, & Jin) · Team 2 (Jungkook, RM, & J-Hope)	January 19, 2021
BTS divide into two teams of three (Note: Suga does not appear in this episode as it took place during the recovery period after his shoulder surgery.) and prepare dishes using "k-ham" (canned pork) that will be judged by South Korean chef Baek Jong-won. The winning team will receive special knives engraved with Baek's name as a prize. Team 1 cooks ham potato stew. Team 2 cooks ramen, ham and rice. Baek shows BTS how to make ham fried rice in return. At the end of the episode, Baek announces that both teams won because they both made their dishes well, and presents knives to all seven members. The episode is a collaboration between Baek and BTS to promote Korean pork. A condensed version of the special was aired on episode 59 of Baek's SBS TV reality cuisine show, Delicious Rendezvous, on January 28, 2021.
127	70	"777 Lucky Seven" (Part 1)	none	none	January 26, 2021
The members must complete 14 challenges in order to go home. J-Hope and V carry out their punishment from episode 124 by wearing spangled t-shirts.
128	71	"777 Lucky Seven" (Part 2)	none	none	February 2, 2021
Suga is the first to complete all challenges. V is unable to complete the final dominoes challenge and finishes last but is allowed to go home.
129	72	"Hello 2021"	none	none	February 9, 2021
BTS play three indoor games. They will be randomly penalized according to how well or poorly the other members play. The first is the "Liar Game". Jungkook wins, Jin receives the penalty. For the second game, BTS must correctly identify the title of their song being played on the harmonica by one of the members. Jungkook scores the most points. RM, Jin, Jimin, and V share the penalty—the last two lose. The final game is a cushion version of Red Light, Green Light. RM and V lose, but the latter is selected as the day's MVP. The members give closing comments on their hopes for the new year, and RM and V carry out their penalty.
130	73	"Long-term Project Tennis"	none	Jungkook, Suga, & Jin · V, Jimin, RM, & J-Hope.	February 16, 2021
BTS begin their long-term project, Tennis. (Note: potential long-term projects were previously discussed in Episode 125, "Producer Special") Former members of the Korean national team, Im Kyu-tae and Kwon Soon-woo, appear as guest coaches in the first half of the episode. BTS split into two groups of three (Jungkook, Suga, Jin) and four (V, Jimin, RM, J-Hope)—Im teaches the former the forehand swing, Kwon teaches the latter the backhand swing. The groups switch coaches to learn the other swing, then play a short practice game against each other. Jungkook, Suga, Jin, and Kwon win. The rest of the episode consists of footage of the members taking tennis lessons at a professional center in the weeks following.
131	74	"Long-term Project Tennis 2"	Suga	none	February 23, 2021
Using their recently acquired tennis skills, BTS compete against each other in a tennis tournament, BTS Tennis Championship, refereed by tennis coach Kim Sang-hyun. Suga does not participate in the competition, but serves as MC and as a commentator alongside Kim. Jin wins both of his matches (10–6 against Jimin in the semi-final, 7–3 against V in the final) and the tournament. He receives a gold medal. The members eat dinner together at a Chinese restaurant to celebrate.
132	75	"77 Minute Debate" (Part 1)	none	none	March 2, 2021
BTS engage in a 77-minute debate on seven different topics at a hotel pool; each round lasts 11 minutes. They all write "Run BTS" on their palms and the member with the clearest remaining writing at the end of the day will win a certificate for the hotel.
133	76	"77 Minute Debate" (Part 2)	none	none	March 9, 2021
BTS complete the final four debate topics. Jimin is declared the winner.
134	77	"Workshop Special" (Part 1)	none	none	March 16, 2021
BTS does three programs: "Search King", "Guess This Dance", and "Protect My Belongings". They play a typing game as a warmup. Jungkook is the slowest and ends up in last place; he is awarded a giant keyboard to use as a handicap for "Search King". Jimin wins "Search King".
135	78	"Workshop Special" (Part 2)	none	none	March 23, 2021
BTS play the "Guess This Dance" challenge next. Jungkook wins.
136	79	"Workshop Special" (Part 3)	none	none	March 30, 2021
"Protect My Belongings" is the final challenge. Jungkook and J-Hope win. As a penalty, Jimin has to make lunch for himself, RM, and Suga, for their climb up Achasan mountain.
137	80	"Entertainment Quiz Show" (Part 1)	none	Team Jimin and Jungkook (Jimin & Jungkook) · Team 1, 2, 3, Fighting (RM & V) · Team J-Hope awesome Jin (Jin & J-Hope)	April 6, 2021
BTS split into three teams and play a quiz show. There are three main categories: nonsense questions, beeper code quiz, and Dialect quiz. The teams receive prizes based on the number of points they score.
138	81	"Entertainment Quiz Show" (Part 2)	none	Team Jimin and Jungkook (Jimin & Jungkook) · Team 1, 2, 3, Fighting (RM & V) · Team J-Hope awesome Jin (Jin & J-Hope)	April 13, 2021
BTS play several games related to guessing music from the past and present next. Jungkook and V end up using phone call chances. Team J-Hope awesome Jin wins.
139	82	"BTS Table Tennis Class" (Part 1)	none	none	April 20, 2021
BTS members practice table tennis with You Seung Min
140	83	"BTS Table Tennis Class" (Part 2)	none	none	April 27, 2021
The episode continues with the members competing against each other in a table tennis tournament. V wins (after besting Jungkook in the first round, Jimin in the semi-final round, and J-Hope in the final round). Jin loses the final match against Jungkook and has to clean up.
141	84	"BTS Collaboration Variety Show" (Part 1)	Na Young-seok	none	May 4, 2021
In a collaboration between Run BTS and TV producer-director Na Young-seok's The Game Caterers, (Note: The Game Caterers (출장 십오야; Chuljang siboya; 'Fifteen Nights on a Business Trip') is a tvN variety show produced, directed, and hosted by Na Young-seok.) BTS members take on challenges and missions akin to the popular variety shows Na has produced.
142	85	"BTS Collaboration Variety Show" (Part 2)	Na Young-seok	none	May 11, 2021
In a collaboration between Run BTS and TV producer-director Na Young-seok's The Game Caterers, BTS members take on challenges and missions akin to the popular variety shows Na had produced. Jimin wins. In the end, the members receive gifts from Game Caterers. This is the final episode to use "On" as the opening theme. The show went on a month-long hiatus after this episode in order to accommodate promotions for the band's new single at the time, "Butter", followed by their eighth anniversary celebrations.
143	86	"Perfect Pairings"	Baek Jong-won	Team Green Onion (J-Hope, RM & Jimin) · Team Napa Cabbage (V, Jin & Jungkook)	June 15, 2021
Chef Baek Jong-won returns to oversee a cooking challenge. BTS divide into two groups of three and must each cook a dish using kimchi. Team Napa Cabbage makes kimchi and sujebi while Team Green Onion makes green onion kimchi and jjajang ramyeon. This is the first episode to use "Butter" as the opening theme.
144	87	"BTS Books"	none	V & J-Hope · Jungkook & Jin · Jimin & RM	June 22, 2021
BTS write children's stories. All teams win. Suga has to write book reports on the stories.
145	88	"RUN BTS Gayo"	TBA	TBA	June 29, 2021
BTS participate in three rounds of quizzes about their songs: the consonant quiz, picture speed quiz, and songs based on ARMY's choice. V is named the episode's MVP.
146	89	"BTS Village: Joseon Dynasty 1"	none	Thieves (unknown) · Citizens (unknown)	August 3, 2021
BTS play a Mafia–treasure hunt hybrid game in the BTS Village, now set in the Joseon Dynasty. The members act as Joseon-era residents of the village and have to find the missing piece of the broken (in episode 121) ARMY headstone to return to 2021. They must correctly guess who among them are the Thieves trying to distract them in their search, and avoid being caught by the royal army or receive a penalty. Clues to the location of the missing piece are hidden throughout the village. Each member is additionally given an individual mission to carry out and can receive a "superpower" to aid their search if they successfully complete it. The game comprises two rounds. The losing team will be flogged by the winning team. Episodes set in BTS Village make up the "BTS Village universe" (as explained in this episode). "BTS Village: Joseon Dynasty" is preceded by Season 2's "Protect the BTS Village" (episodes 48–49), and Season 3's "Reply BTS Village" (episodes 121–122).
147	90	"BTS Village: Joseon Dynasty 2"	none	Thieves (unknown) · Citizens (unknown)	August 10, 2021
BTS play a Mafia–treasure hunt hybrid game in the BTS Village, set in the Joseon Dynasty. With some prompting from the staff, BTS successfully locate the first hint to the location of the missing headstone piece and complete round one. The searchable game area expands and round two begins. The members locate more clues and try to decipher their meaning, while their suspicions of one another other grow. RM figures out that there must be at least three Thieves among them.
148	91	"BTS Village: Joseon Dynasty 3"	none	Thieves (Jin & Suga) · Citizens (J-Hope, RM, Jimin, Taehyung & Jungkook)	August 17, 2021
BTS play a Mafia–treasure hunt hybrid game in the BTS Village, set in the Joseon Dynasty. They locate the headstone piece hidden in the clothes of a prisoner mannequin in one of the jail cells, and review collected clues to eliminate the members suspected of being Thieves—Suga, Jin, and V are chosen. After lengthy deliberation, Jimin, J-Hope, RM, and Jungkook successfully raise the headstone and return to 2021. Jin and Suga reveal themselves as the Thieves—the staff confirm there were only two the entire time and that V was an innocent villager. For their penalty, they are each hit once with a thick wooden rod (the gonjang, a Joseon-era form of punishment) by V and Jungkook respectively.
149	92	"Bangtan Interior Design 1"	none	Jin team (Jin, J-Hope, RM & V) · Suga team (Suga, Jungkook & Jimin)	August 24, 2021
BTS try out interior design. They divide into two teams and must complete one of two prepared room concepts. They play several quizzes to decide which team will choose first—the winning team will receive help from the staff. Suga team wins and selects Interior A (soft grey), Jin team gets Interior B (dark blue). Each team must paint and decorate a 4m × 4m room, and furnish it with furniture they have assembled themselves.
150	93	"Bangtan Interior Design 2"	none	Jin team (Jin, J-Hope, RM & V) · Suga team (Suga, Jungkook & Jimin)	August 31, 2021
BTS try out interior design. Both teams finish preparing their rooms and the staff vote for the best one. Suga team wins.
151	94	"War of Money Staycation, 1"	none	none	September 7, 2021
BTS go on a staycation at Josun Palace Hotel in Gangnam. They play games to determine individual room assignments—Jimin ends up with the smallest room. The members are provided with special room-service menus, a credit card with an unknown limit, and given a mission: they can order anything from the menu (two items per person), but must do so in the order they went into their rooms, and without knowing what the food budget is. The mission will end when they either bring the card balance down to zero, or exceed the limit. If they achieve the former, they will receive ₩7 million in prize money to be divided equally among themselves.
152	95	"War of Money Staycation, 2"	none	none	September 14, 2021
BTS order exactly ₩8.01 million worth of food and games for the mission, then spend the rest of their time relaxing alone and with each other. At the end of the episode, the staff reveal that they correctly guessed the budget and award them the prize money.
153	96	"Throwback Songs 1"	none	none	September 21, 2021
BTS play song guessing games and are given the opportunity to reset all penalties accrued from past episodes that have not yet been carried out. They guess the titles of old cartoon theme songs based on a brief musical excerpt, and play Metal Tray Karaoke: two songs are mixed together and they must correctly sing the corresponding part and lyrics of the entire mix. If they get it wrong, an aluminum tray will be dropped on their head. The day's loser will have to cross the skybridge of Lotte World Tower (541m high), accompanied by a member of his choosing.
154	97	"Throwback Songs 2"	none	none	September 28, 2021
J-Hope is the runner-up and wins a penalty exemption. Suga places last, and RM volunteers to accompany him to Lotte World Tower. While crossing the skybridge, they stop halfway to perform the choreography for "Permission to Dance" together.
155	98	"Finale (Part 1)"	Jin	none	October 5, 2021
BTS revisit various episodes in the show's history and must guess which ones are the highest-ranked as voted by fans.
156	99	"Finale (Part 2)"	none	none	October 12, 2021
BTS play games (photozone and debate) from past episodes of the show and reminisce about old memories.

=== Special Season (2022–23) ===
No. overall	No. in season	Title	MC	Teams	Original release date
—	SPE	"Telepathy Part 1"	none	none	August 16, 2022
Reunited after a 10-month break, BTS play a series of "telepathy games" to test how in tune with each other they still are. They play two guessing games in the filming studio. For the third game, they are put into separate cars, given a keyword ("Real fun"), and must visit a place based on the keyword that they think the other members would go to. The game comprises two rounds and the first ends when they each arrive at their destination. To successfully carry out the mission, all seven members must end up in the same place. V, Jin, Jimin, and RM head to Nonhyeon-dong; J-Hope goes to Jamsil Olympic Stadium; Suga goes to Jamwon Hangang Park; Jungkook goes to Lotte World.
—	SPE	"Telepathy Part 2"	none	none	August 23, 2022
Jimin, RM, Jin, V, and Jungkook meet up at their old Blue Dorm in the second round—the keyword was "Salty" and they all headed to a place where they had several memorable fights in the past. Suga and J-Hope head to their first dorm and the restaurant next to their old practice room, but are unable to meet each other. In the third round, the staff let the members decide the keywords themselves and Suga runs into J-Hope who still has not left his previous destination. They figure out the location of the others and reunite with them at Han River Park. The final keyword given is "ARMY". Six of the members head to Jamsil Olympic Stadium while V goes to Ilji Art Hall, the venue of their first concert. At the end of the episode, the septet have a meal together and discuss ideas for future episodes.
—	SPE	"Fly BTS Fly Part 1"	none	none	October 11, 2022
Based on their discussion at the end of the "Telepathy" special, BTS try aerial yoga for the first time. An instructor teaches the members various beginner positions and they must have the best possible photos taken of themselves in any of the poses learned to post on social media.
—	SPE	"Fly BTS Fly Part 2"	none	none	October 18, 2022
BTS learn more aerial yoga positions then select one pose they each like best and take individual photos. Jimin goes first, followed by Jin, then Jungkook, Suga, J-Hope, RM, and V. After successfully taking usable photos, the staff inform them that unit photos are next. The instructor demonstrates duo positions with Jimin then the pairs (J-Hope and Jungkook, Suga and RM, Jin and V) replicate the poses and take their photos. Jimin and Jungkook are selected to pose together for a final duo photo as the "ace team". (Note: The member(s)/team who performs the best overall in any given episode is considered the "ace".) Per the members request, the instructor teaches them the Bat position, following which the episode ends with them posing for a group photo—to be used as the episode's video thumbnail—upside down.
—	SPE	"'RUN BTS TV' On-air Part 1"	none	none	November 22, 2022
BTS assume the role of both content creators and audience viewers in the "BTS Dalbang TV Special". The members launch individual media channels by preparing and presenting a live show of their choosing. During each broadcast, the remaining six members act as viewers and watch the show from a separate set designed to mimic a home-viewing experience. The presenter must interact with and keep the attention of the viewers while engaging in his selected activity. The viewers can post comments in a live chatroom for the presenter to see. Jungkook learns to play "Butter" on the drums with a guest teacher; Suga takes painting requests; Jin plays online games; J-Hope unboxes children's toys.
—	SPE	"'RUN BTS TV' On-air Part 2"	none	none	November 29, 2022
J-Hope finishes his show. V plays screen golf; RM answers a series of nonsensical questions; Jimin does a mukbang.
—	SPE	"Next Top Genius Part 1"	none	none	January 3, 2023
BTS participate in a "psychological and brain competition". They play a number card game first. Jimin wins. Next is the Cat ears O, X liar game, during which the members all wear electroencephalographic cat ears. A question is sent via cellphone to five "Villagers" while a liar message is sent to two "Liars". All seven must answer the question, without it being revealed aloud, by raising an O or X paddle in agreement/disagreement. The Villagers must then correctly identify the Liars at the end of each round in order to win the game. The Villagers eventually win.
—	SPE	"Next Top Genius Part 2"	none	none	January 10, 2023
BTS play three more games: "I Object", "Yes or No", and Hopscotch-Rock paper scissors. Suga wins "I Object", Jimin and V win "Yes or No", Jimin wins Hopscotch-Rock paper scissors.
—	SPE	"Mini Field Day Part 1"	none	none	February 14, 2023
BTS participate in a mini field day similar to the Idol Star Athletics Championships. Four games will be played and the person who accumulates the most points overall will be the day's winner. V wins in Soft Fencing, while Jungkook wins in Volleyball.
—	SPE	"Mini Field Day Part 2"	none	none	February 21, 2023
BTS play the final two games for their field day. First is weightlifting with ping pong balls; V wins. Next is Slippery Soccer. (Note: soccer played on a soap-covered plastic pitch) They divide into two teams: Red (Jin, Jungkook, V) and Blue (Jimin, J-Hope, RM, Suga); the game ends in a draw. At the medal ceremony, V receives gold as the day's overall winner; Jungkook receives silver; J-Hope receives bronze. Jin also receives a medal as the day's MVP and "hidden" first place winner for winning first place on M Countdown with "The Astronaut". This was the final episode filmed before Jin enlisted in December 2022.

=== Season 4: 2.0 (2026–present) ===
No. overall	No. in season	Title	MC	Teams	Original release date
—	0	"Everyone!! It's here!! "Run BTS! 2.0" is here!!"	none	none	April 7, 2026
A prologue episode that focused on the group's discussions regarding the revamped program's schedules and plans.
157	1	"BTS's TRIP EP.1: BTS's Room Assignment Saga"	none	Team First Floor (RM, SUGA, j-hope & V) vs Team Second Floor (Jin, Jimin & Jung Kook)	April 23, 2026
Similar to Episode 71, members choose their rooms. RM, SUGA, j-hope, and V share one room. Jin and Jimin share one room, while Jungkook had another room to himself. Later, they play a game of blindfold pillow fight. Team First Floor wins. Team Second Floor has to clean up.
158	2	"BTS's TRIP EP.2: You've never kneeled with your hands up for an hour, have you?"	none	Team First Floor (RM, SUGA, j-hope & V) vs Team Second Floor (Jin, Jimin & Jung Kook)	April 30, 2026
159	3	"BTS's TRIP EP.3: The Great Foot Volleyball Showdown"	none	Team First Floor (RM, SUGA, j-hope & V) vs Team Second Floor (Jin, Jimin & Jung Kook)	May 5, 2026
The members play a game of foot volleyball. Team Second Floor wins. RM and j-hope are safe from the penalty. Suga and V have to go to Bomunsa Temple and write a wish on a roof tile.
160	4	"BTS in Toronto Part 1"	none	none	October 6, 2026
The group plays variety of games such as handkerchief game (similar to duck duck goose) and red light green light.
161	5	"BTS in Toronto Part 2"	none	Team Kim Seokjin (Jimin & Jungkook), Team Kim Seokjin 1 (j-hope), Kim-Kim (RM & Jin), VUGA (Suga & V)	October 11, 2026
As a continuation of the picnic, they play hacky sack. Jungkook wins. Later, the group plays a pickle ball tournament. They determine the teams in a game of rock-paper-scissors. Team Kim Seokjin wins (after beating Kim-Kim in the first round, and Team Seokjin 1 in the finals).

== Promotion ==
BTS uploaded two videos advertising the then-upcoming new variety show to their V Live channel on February 28, 2015. The first video received 242,000 views and 2.24 million likes, and the second received 100,000 views and 87,000 likes within three days of being posted.

== Release ==
The first season of Run BTS premiered on V Live, a South Korean live video streaming service, on August 1, 2015. Episodes generally aired every Tuesday, except for when an episode of BTS Gayo was released instead. The series went on a year-long hiatus after the January 5, 2016, episode. The second season premiered on January 31, 2017. The series began consistently airing new episodes weekly as of the May 23, 2017, episode. The third season premiered on January 1, 2019. In 2020, the season's broadcast was paused twice: first for the airing of the band's documentary series Break The Silence in May, and then for their new reality show BTS In the Soop, which ran from the second week of August until the third week of October. In 2021, the series went on a brief hiatus from the beginning of May through mid-June to accommodate promotions for the release of the band's new song at that time. This was followed by a second temporary hiatus in October—after the season three finale on the 12th—for the airing of the second season of BTS In the Soop which premiered on the 15th.

In June 2022, during BTS' ninth-anniversary celebrations, the band announced they would be focusing more on solo endeavours going forward, but emphasized that they would continue filming Run BTS as a group. A two-part special—the first new episode in 10 months—premiered on August 16. This marked the first time an episode was officially made available on YouTube. Several weeks prior, Hybe announced that subsequent episodes would also be uploaded to the platform, but did not provide a release schedule at the time.

The series returned as Run BTS! 2.0 starting April 23, 2026. A prologue episode was released on April 7, which focused on their discussions regarding the revamped program's schedules and plans.

=== TV broadcast ===
On July 10, 2018, domestic news media announced that cable music channel Mnet would begin airing eight of the most popular Run BTS episodes on television at 6 pm KST every Wednesday night beginning July 11 for eight weeks. Season 2's "MT" (Ep.17–18) and "Manito" (Ep. 23–24) episodes were among those selected. The eighth and final episode aired on August 29. In 2020, Mnet announced on August 6 that it would once again be airing eight of the most popular episodes from among those released between 2019 and 2020 as a summer vacation television special—the 100th Episode Special, Avatar Cooking King, and Photo Exhibition episodes were included in the lineup. Episodes aired every Thursday night at 8 pm KST from August 6 for eight weeks until September 24. The network additionally aired the Season 3 2019 episode, "Hangul Day Special", on October 1 as a Chuseok special.

On April 1, 2021, South Korean cable television network JTBC announced a 10-week long Spring special programming block of content from Hybe Labels artists that began airing that same date on JTBC2—every Thursday night at 7:30 pm KST. Run BTS was included in the lineup for BTS. Two new episodes of the series premiered on television first, and then on Weverse and V Live afterwards.

== Reception ==
=== Accolades ===
Run BTS was nominated for and won Best V Original at the 2018 V Live Awards.

== Spin-off: Run Jin ==
Run Jin
- Hangul: 달려라 석진
- RR: Dallyeora Seokjin
- MR: Tallyŏra Sŏkchin
- Genre: Variety show
- Starring: Jin of BTS
- Opening theme: "Super Tuna" (2024–2025); "I'll Be There" (2025)
- Country of origin: South Korea
- Original language: Korean
- No. of seasons: 1
- No. of episodes: 36

Original release
- Network: Weverse; YouTube
- Release: August 13, 2024 – May 27, 2025

Shortly after his discharge and the completion of his mandatory military service in June 2024, Jin announced the launch of his own variety series Run Jin, a spin-off the boy band's own variety show Run BTS.

The premiere episode was filmed five days after his discharge and aired on August 13, with subsequent episodes released weekly on both YouTube and Weverse in the time slot previously occupied by Run BTS.

No. overall	No. in season	Title	Special Guest(s)	Original release date
1	1	"5 Days Since Discharge and I'm Climbing Mt. Hallasan..."	none	August 13, 2024
2	2	"A Glorious Homecoming"	none	August 20, 2024
3	3	"Even Leaving the Military Wasn't This Hard"	none	August 27, 2024
4	4	"A Dangerous Invitation from Jin 1"	Yeon-jun from Tomorrow X Together, Kwaktube, Kim Dong-hyun	September 3, 2024
5	5	"A Dangerous Invitation from Jin 2"	Yeon-jun from Tomorrow X Together, Kwaktube, Kim Dong-hyun	September 10, 2024
6	6	"The Prince of Tennis"	Lee Yi-kyung	September 17, 2024
7	7	"The New Channel Owner"	Jee Seok-jin	September 24, 2024
8	8	"Find Jin"	Jee Seok-jin	October 1, 2024
9	9	"Blood, Sweat & Peppers"	none	October 8, 2024
10	10	"Freeze! Polliceping"	Sandeul from B1A4	October 15, 2024
11	11	"I Met a Ghost for Real"	none	October 22, 2024
12	12	"K-Mukbang"	Hong Yoon-hwa, Kim Min-kyung, Yoo Min-sang	December 3, 2024
13	13	"Don't Watch This If You Don't Want To Marry Jin"	Yoon Tae-ha	December 10, 2024
14	14	"Goodbye, Jin"	Kim Dong-hyun, Jonathan Yiombi	December 17, 2024
15	15	"You've Been Kidnapped"	J-Hope from BTS	December 24, 2024
16	16	"It's Me, Zombie"	J-Hope from BTS	January 7, 2025 (Note: Originally set to be released on December 31, 2024, the episode was postponed in respect to the Jeju Air Flight 2216 victims and their families.)
17	17	"New Year's Gift Giveaway"	Sandeul from B1A4	January 14, 2025
18	18	"The Magpie 'Jin' that Repaid a Favor"	Hong Jin-kyung	January 21, 2025
19	19	"Gymnastics Day"	Beomgyu from Tomorrow X Together, Yang Hak-seon	January 28, 2025
20	20	"Variety Show Extravaganza 1"	Seo Eun-kwang from BTOB, Shin Bong-sun, Heo Kyung-hwan, Lee Yong-jin	February 4, 2025
21	21	"Variety Show Extravaganza 2"	Seo Eun-kwang from BTOB, Shin Bong-sun, Heo Kyung-hwan, Lee Yong-jin	February 11, 2025
22	22	"Jin vs Jin (feat. Climbing)"	none	February 18, 2025
23	23	"Jin in the Strange Land of Fairytales"	Jonathan Yiombi, Patricia Yiombi	February 25, 2025
24	24	"Squid-Jin Game 1"	Nam Chang-hee, Shin Seung-ho, Son Dong-pyo	March 4, 2025
25	25	"Squid-Jin Game 2"	Nam Chang-hee, Shin Seung-ho, Son Dong-pyo	March 11, 2025
26	26	"The Scorching Gourmet"	Yutaka Matsushige, Kangnam	March 18, 2025
27	27	"The Fencing Guys"	Oh Sang-uk, Gu Bon-gil	March 25, 2025
28	28	"Falling for Jin!"	Park Hyung-sik	April 1, 2025
29	29	"House of Serenity"	Mimiminu	April 8, 2025
30	30	"Run Jin B&B"	Kian84, Ji Ye-eun	April 15, 2025
31	31	"Game Master Showdown 1"	Yeon-jun and Taehyun from Tomorrow X Together, Jungwon and Jay from Enhypen, Son Dong-pyo	April 22, 2025
32	32	"Game Master Showdown 2"	Yeon-jun and Taehyun from Tomorrow X Together, Jungwon and Jay from Enhypen, Son Dong-pyo	April 29, 2025
33	33	"Jin Wick"	Jung Doo-hong	May 6, 2025
34	34	"Taekwon Jin"	Kang Seung-yoon from Winner, Lee Ok-hyun from K-Tigers, Kim Tae-seong from K-TIGERS ZERO, Min Kang-hee	May 13, 2025
35	35	"Mission: Jin-Possible"	Tom Cruise	May 20, 2025
36	36	"It's the Last Episode and They Are Telling Me to Go Up..."	Sandeul from B1A4	May 27, 2025
