= BTS In the Soop =

South Korean reality series

- Season 2 logo
- Also known as: In the Soop; In the Soop BTS ver.
- Hangul: 인더숲 BTS편
- RR: Indeosup BTSpyeon
- MR: Indŏsup BTSp'yŏn
- Genre: Reality series
- Written by: Lee Yoo-ri
- Directed by: Park Jun-soo; Kim Hyang-mi; Lee Yoo-jin; Kim Kyung-won
- Starring: RM; Jin; Suga; J-Hope; Jimin; V; Jungkook; Bam (season 2)
- Opening theme: "In the Soop" (Note: stylized as "In the SOOP") performed by BTS
- Ending theme: Same as above
- Country of origin: South Korea
- Original language: Korean
- No. of seasons: 2
- No. of episodes: 13

Production
- Executive producers: Bang Si-hyuk; Lenzo Yoon
- Production locations: Lake 192, Chuncheon, Gangwon Province (season 1); Pyeongchang, Gangwon-do (season 2)
- Cinematography: Jung Ji-soo
- Running time: 60 minutes (JTBC); 70–80 minutes (Weverse)
- Production companies: Big Hit, Big Hit Three Sixty (season 1); Hybe 360 (season 2)

Original release
- Network: JTBC; Weverse
- Release: August 19, 2020 – November 12, 2021

Related
- Seventeen In the Soop; In the Soop: Friendcation

BTS In the Soop (stylized as BTS In the SOOP, Korean: 인더숲 BTS편; RR: Indeosup BTSpyeon; lit. 'In the Forest: BTS edition') is a South Korean reality series created by Big Hit Entertainment and Big Hit Three Sixty, starring boy band BTS. The eight-episode first season premiered on August 19, 2020, on the South Korean pay television network JTBC and the online platform Weverse, and features the band taking a break from their busy lives in the city to spend a week together at a remote forest location where they relax and engage in various hobbies.

A second season, produced by Hybe 360, (Note: Following a company-wide rebrand in March 2021, Big Hit Entertainment became Hybe Corporation and Big Hit 360 became Hybe 360.) premiered on October 15, 2021, and follows the band as they spend four days at a private villa in the mountains. The version that aired on JTBC comprised four episodes. The Weverse version contained extended footage and spanned five episodes, the last of which was exclusive to the platform and aired on November 12.

== Premise ==
The show's concept revolves around BTS taking a break from their busy lives in the city and heading to a more peaceful, remote forest location—the Korean word soop means "forest"—for a period of relaxation. The series' tagline, "between everyday life and rest", is reflected heavily throughout, as the band members follow no structured schedules while there and freely pursue various indoor and outdoor hobbies together and on their own. They are able to do "things they didn't do because they didn't want to take the time off", or "couldn't do because they [were] too busy", with minimal interference from or interaction with the production staff.

== Cast ==
- RM as himself
- Jin as himself
- Suga as himself
- J-Hope as himself
- Jimin as himself
- V as himself
- Jungkook as himself
- Bam (Jungkook's dog, season 2)

== Broadcast and format ==
VOD preorders for season one began on August 4, 2020, through the Weverse Shop e-commerce app—priced at ₩35,000/USD$27.99—and continued until August 19, just before the season premiere. An exclusive photo card set was included for free as a preorder bonus. The first episode aired on pay television network JTBC at 11 pm KST on August 19. New episodes—eight in total at a runtime of 60 minutes each—were released every Wednesday night at that same time, and made available one hour later on Weverse (mobile app and website) at 12 am KST as exclusive subscription-based paid content with an extended runtime of 80 minutes. Additional 10-minute long clips featuring behind-the-scenes footage from each episode were uploaded to Weverse every following Tuesday at 9 pm KST.

Season two was announced on September 1, 2021. VOD preorders took place from September 23 through October 5 (early-bird), and then from October 6–15 (general)—at the same price as season one—with different bonuses offered for each purchase period. The season premiered on October 15 at 9 pm KST on JTBC, and 10 pm KST on Weverse, with new episodes released every Friday. The version that aired on television comprised only four episodes and ended on November 5. The Weverse version contained an exclusive fifth episode that became available on November 12. Behind-the-scenes footage from the season was released as a sixth 'episode' on the platform on November 19. Japanese television network TBS began domestic broadcasting of the season on March 25, 2023.

The series is available for viewing in 720p HD and 1080p FHD on the Weverse app and website, with subtitles provided in Korean, English, Japanese, and Chinese.

== Production ==
Layout of the lakeside property from season 1, showing the floating house (forefront) on the lake, the Main House (left), and the Upper House (top) to the back of the property. The yard of the Main House shows the tent where Jin slept (far left), the Tarp where the band ate outdoors (lower middle), and the campsite (far right).

Season one of the series was produced by Big Hit Entertainment and Big Hit Three Sixty. Filming took place at a private lakeside property known as Lake 192, a popular airbnb site also used for hosting corporate workshops, family events, and small weddings. Located at Gail-ri, Sabuk-myeon, Chuncheon, in the Gangwon-do province, the property has featured in various media and commercials, and was awarded the "Korea Architecture Prize" for its modern design. The property consists of a two-storey, two-bedroom house (referred to in the series as the "Main House"), with a kitchen, living room, multiple terraces (one of which was used by the members for painting), and a large yard that also doubled as a camping site (Jin occasionally slept in a tent set up on the front lawn); a vegetable garden; a two-bedroom guesthouse located directly over the lake (referred to as the "floating house") with a surrounding terrace (used by the members for fishing and to dock the fishing boats); an additional one-storey, single-bedroom house (referred to as the "Upper House") with a living room area set up for gaming, a kitchen (most of the cooking during the series was done here), and an open gazebo that served as an outdoor eating area. The production staff made various modifications to the premises, including bringing in a campervan as an additional sleeping space; installing a large saltwater fish tank with flatfish; providing a 4 hp engine (Note: In South Korea, boats with engines under 5 hp do not require a license to operate.) fishing boat; installing an outdoor pool and hot tub; setting up a boxing bag, exercise equipment, and goal post in the main yard; creating an outdoor eating area under a large tarp (referred to as "the Tarp") in the main yard.

Production for the second season took place on a much larger scale. Unlike the first season, which used a rented site for filming, Hybe purchased an undisclosed acreage of land surrounded by the mountains in Pyeongchang County, Gangwon-do—it also included a detached two-storey house (first floor: 120.72 m^{2}, second floor: 77.1 m^{2})—for ₩1.295 billion. The property underwent extensive remodeling and landscaping over the course of a year—work began when the first season ended—in preparation for the new season, and features a newly built tennis court—it is also used as a basketball and foot volleyball court—and an outdoor pool, among other amenities. The property contains three large, two-storey villas, the biggest of which, referred to as "House A" in the series, is where the members congregated most often during their stay. The first floor contains an open kitchen and lounge, the living room, a gym, and a PC room equipped with a five-computer-setup for gaming. The upper floor contains a reading area, equipped with a small library, referred to as "the Study". The other two houses, referred to as "House B" and "House C" respectively, serve as sleeping accommodations, with three bedrooms in B (used by Jin, RM, and Suga), and four bedrooms in C (used by J-Hope, Jimin, Jungkook, and V). The lower part of the grounds, after the tennis court, is the camping zone: a large yard that houses the Airstream. The property is accessible by a private road through the mountains via smaller vehicles such as bicycles, vans, or ATVs (as seen in the series).

== Episodes ==
=== Series overview ===
Series overview
Season	Episodes	Originally released	
Season	Episodes	First released	Last released
1	8	August 19, 2020	October 7, 2020
2	5	October 15, 2021	November 12, 2021

=== Season 1 (2020) ===
No. overall	No. in season	Title	Original release date
1	1	"Excited to Begin"	August 19, 2020
The episode opens with interview footage filmed three months prior to the start of the series. The production staff inform BTS about the new show and collect ideas from the members about what they want (food items, games, toys, sport and exercise equipment etc.) in preparation for their stay. The video then cuts to the band getting ready to leave Seoul. They drive (Note: Suga drives the first car, with Jin; Jimin drives the second, with J-Hope and V; Jungkook drives the third, with RM) to a large, scenic pension property in Chuncheon, located on the Bukhan River. After touring the grounds, the members select their rooms, (Note: Suga chooses the campervan; Jungkook and J-Hope decide to share the floating house on the lake; RM and Jin the Main House; Jimin and V the Upper House.) then play football and table tennis while Suga and Jungkook cook Jjapaguri with steak (Note: the version of the dish popularized in the 2019 film Parasite) for lunch. After lunch, they unpack the grocery supplies for the week and divide everything up between both houses. The members spend the rest of the day relaxing: Jin goes fishing; Jimin plays the keyboard; RM and V assemble remote-control boats; J-Hope builds a rubber-powered glider; Jungkook practices the guitar and boxing.
2	2	"Free Time"	August 26, 2020
Continuing from the previous episode, the members carry on with their hobbies for the rest of the day, including table tennis and online gaming. Jin, J-Hope, Jungkook, and Suga cook budae-jjigae for dinner—Jungkook helps Jin fillet flatfish and the latter makes sashimi for the first time. J-Hope and Jungkook light fireworks after dinner.
3	3	"Memories of a Rainy Day"	September 2, 2020
Jin wakes first the next morning and rouses the others with his keyboard-playing. Suga and J-Hope prepare ingredients for lunch. Together with Jin, they cook gamasot bokkeum-bap—fried rice with pork belly—outdoors, on the lid of a large cast iron pot. Afterwards, Jin and Suga play computer games while the others clean up. Jungkook makes french toast as a snack. The weather forecast predicts rain so the members do various things outdoors before then. Jin takes the boat out on the lake, but fails to catch any fish; RM and J-Hope build Legos together; Jungkook practices boxing; Jimin and V play the keyboard and sing together. Rain falls and the members gather inside the Main House—Jin decides to paint out on the terrace. V's playing leads to them creating a theme song for the series together and Suga records it with his music equipment. For dinner, he and J-Hope prepare seafood pajeon and eomuk-tang, and pair it with makgeolli. Namjoon takes pictures as they gather outside to eat—Jin teaches Taehyung and Jungkook how to flip the pajeon. They spend the rest of the night drinking and talking with each other.
4	4	"Farewell For Now"	September 10, 2020
After dinner, the members game at the Upper House while V sings karaoke in the Main House. RM and J-Hope drink beer together and have a heart-to-heart under the tarp before bed. Jin sleeps in the tent, and V rooms with RM. In the morning, V makes nurungji for breakfast, then plays with his remote-control boat at the lake while Jin and J-Hope go jogging. Jungkook and RM spend time together in the Main House. For lunch, J-Hope and Suga make pork galbi and mul naengmyeon; Jin fillets rockfish and makes mulhoe (Note: a spicy, raw fish soup) for the first time; Jungkook and V prepare grilled sausages and Jamón-wrapped melon. After lunch, RM temporarily returns to Seoul for a work schedule. The remaining members do various activities together, including painting and karaoke. They make Jjapaguri and Angry Neoguri (Note: a spicier version of Jjapaguri) for dinner, then pack up and leave for Seoul.
5	5	"Back to the Forest"	September 16, 2020
The members drive (Note: Jin drives Jungkook; Jimin drives Suga and RM; V drives J-Hope) from Seoul back to Chuncheon. After getting resettled, Jin and V play table tennis while J-Hope plays with his glider in the yard. Jimin helps Suga prepare dak-galbi for lunch—Suga grills the meat outside while Jin makes naengmyeon. RM reads in the yard while Jungkook and V play catch. Jimin joins them for a game of baseball. After lunch, Jungkook falls asleep, while Jin, Suga, Jimin, and V play another game of baseball together. When the others leave, Jin continues playing on his own. RM and J-Hope do the dishes; V plays baseball with Jin; Suga games in the Upper House. Later, Jin, Jimin, and RM go canoeing on the lake and retrieve a ball that landed in the water. After returning from the lake, RM reads in his room while Jin takes a nap; J-Hope builds a Stranger Things Lego set; Jimin games with Suga; V spends time alone on the lake in the canoe. Jin and Jungkook fillet flatfish for sushi; Jimin and V sing karaoke together; RM paints on the terrace; Suga works on music in the campervan. For dinner, Suga cooks doenjang-guk while Jungkook helps Jin make sushi—everyone eats outside together under the Tarp.
6	6	"Together, And On Their Own"	September 23, 2020
After dinner, V and Jungkook have a late-night conversation over drinks. They discuss their friendship through the years and the impact the Covid-19 pandemic has had on them. Jin and Jimin play baseball in the yard. In the morning, J-Hope and RM prepare gimbap and yubuchobap (Note: fried tofu skins filled with seasoned rice, vegetables, and meat) for lunch and go hiking together at the mountain Yonghwasan—they eat at the summit. At the Upper House, Jin watches Yoongi game online. For lunch, they cook rice, prepare jeotgal, and grill dakgalbi. Later, RM and Jungkook paint together at the Main House; Jin, Jimin, and Suga spend time gaming at the Upper House and then try wood carving; V and J-Hope drive to a nearby city for Hanwoo burgers. In the evening, V canoes on the lake by himself.
7	7	"BTS Cooking Challenge"	September 30, 2020
The members decide on chimaek for dinner. Jin, J-Hope, and Jungkook make the batter and sauce, and prepare the chicken for frying—the meat is cooked outdoors in the gamasot. After their initial failed attempts, (Note: the chicken was cooked on the outside, but raw on the inside) they successfully fry all the chicken and eat together in the Main House living room—they talk and drink late into the night. Jin and Suga wake first the following day. Jin sets off firecrackers in the yard and wakes J-Hope and V; Suga goes back to bed; Jin and J-Hope make gamasot ramyeon for lunch and V makes tuna mayo rice—Jimin sleeps through lunch. After eating, Jin and V play games together then V takes a nap; J-Hope and Jungkook paint; RM exercises then works on his painting; Jin takes a nap in the hammock; Suga works on music—including the theme song the members created together—in the campervan; Jimin eats a late lunch then goes canoeing on the lake. Later, he and Jungkook sing karaoke together. RM and V get ready to cook dinner.
8	8	"Back To Our Everyday Life"	October 7, 2020
RM and V prepare dinner at the Upper House: RM makes aglio e olio while V cooks the steak. At the Main House, Jungkook sings karaoke by himself then takes a nap; J-Hope finishes his painting; Suga works on music in the campervan. Everyone eats outside together at the Upper House. Later, Jin and Suga have a heartfelt conversation in the Main House while J-Hope, Jungkook, and V light firecrackers in the yard and RM reads in his room. The members play the board game Avalon together late into the night. BTS return to Seoul the next day, after a week spent at their forest retreat. The end of the episode contains footage of the band recording the series theme song "In the Soop" at their studio in Seoul.

=== Season 2 (2021) ===
No. overall	No. in season	Title	Original release date
9	1	"Again In the Soop"	October 15, 2021
The episode opens with interview footage, filmed 30 days prior to the season's start, of the band reflecting on the first season and looking forward to the second. Returning to present day, instead of driving themselves, BTS are transported via private bus—Jungkook brings along his pet Dobermann puppy, Bam—to a mountainside destination, and then by car (Note: the bus is too big to traverse the narrow roads of the mountain terrain) to a large forest villa created just for them. The episode cuts to footage of the extensive renovations the property underwent in preparation for their arrival, interspersed with additional interview footage of various requests made by the members and how the production staff fulfilled those requests. Having arrived late at night, the members choose their rooms (Note: RM, Jin, and Suga decide to share House B; J-Hope, Jimin, and V share House C—Jimin gets the upstairs room, Jungkook takes the left-side studio unit, V the middle unit, and J-Hope the right.) and get settled in. Jin reads in bed; Jimin, J-Hope, and Suga make ramyeon as a late night snack; RM and V explore House A; Jungkook spends time with Bam. RM, J-Hope, and Suga head to their rooms after eating. Jimin and V game in the PC room until early morning, Jungkook does karaoke in the living room—they go to bed after 6AM. Jungkook wakes a few hours later and takes Bam outdoors. J-Hope makes coffee for himself and Suga, then wakes the others. Jungkook makes gimmari (Note: a Korean deep-fried roll made of seaweed wrapped around glass noodles) while Suga prepares spicy tteokbokki for lunch. Jungkook, RM, and V sing karaoke while the food cooks.
10	2	"Fly to In the Soop with BTS"	October 22, 2021
After they finish eating, Jungkook and Suga make watermelon hwachae (Note: Their version included white peaches, milk, and carbonated soda.) for dessert. Jimin plays basketball and works out; V has an online trumpet lesson; Jin lounges in the pool; Suga plays the guitar; Jungkook boxes in the gym and spends time with Bam; RM goes for a bike ride; J-Hope goes swimming—V joins him poolside to play the trumpet and dance to music together; V plays basketball with Bam and tennis with Jungkook; RM goes for a run and works out with Jimin; Jimin and Suga game together; Jin plays Mario Kart in the living room. RM works on a painting in his room, but leaves it unfinished; Jungkook and V ride an ATV around the property; Suga gives Jimin basketball lessons. Together with J-Hope, they join V for target practice with paintball guns. For dinner, Jin and Suga prepare jogaegui, (Note: grilled clams) jogae-tang, and Hanwoo beef. After dinner, Jungkook takes care of Bam and falls asleep first; RM and V sing karaoke together; the other members spend the rest of the night gaming in the PC room.
11	3	"The most beautiful moment in Life, Around the Table Together"	October 29, 2021
Jungkook is the first to wake the next morning and makes an egg sandwich for breakfast. Jin wakes next and takes a brief rest in the pool before heading inside. Together with Jungkook and Suga, he makes haemul kalguksu for breakfast, using the leftover clams from the previous night. Jungkook takes Bam for walk, then sings karaoke in the living room while J-Hope makes croffles for the first time. RM reads upstairs in the Study—he is later joined by Suga. J-Hope and V race remote-control cars outdoors and Jungkook takes one of the ATVs out for a drive. He joins Jimin and J-Hope for a game of tennis afterwards. Jin plays Super Mario World in the living room; Jimin and V game in the PC room; J-Hope builds a water rocket. Jungkook helps Suga with dinner: he makes suyuk while Suga prepares crispy pork belly. After eating the suyuk, the members play foot volleyball out on the court. J-Hope spectates courtside instead of joining the match and eventually goes indoors to rest with Bam.
12	4	"BTS Universe"	November 5, 2021
RM, Jimin, and V win the foot volleyball match. After the game, the members eat the crispy pork belly Suga prepared. Jungkook cooks more suyuk for J-Hope, and Jimin makes ramyeon for everyone to share. Jin and Jungkook go to bed early. V listens to an audiobook in the Study while RM reads outside. He and Jimin join J-Hope and Suga to watch a women's volleyball match between Japan and Korea during the then ongoing 2020 Tokyo Olympics—the episode cuts to footage from the first day of the members watching South Korean archer An San's match against Elena Osipova—after which RM goes to bed. Suga reads in the Study; J-Hope applies a face mask in his room and soaks his feet in a foot spa; Jimin joins him to use the foot spa. They return to House A to drink and play video games. Suga makes canapés as a snack and watches them play. He eventually goes to bed while Jimin and J-Hope continue gaming. They explore some abandoned houses behind the property before going to bed. Jungkook wakes first in the morning and cooks pork belly and bibim ramyeon for breakfast. J-Hope and Suga wake next, Suga makes naengmyeon. Jin makes yeolmu bibimbap (Note: made with Yeolmu-kimchi) then games in the living room. RM makes cup ramyeon and eats it with Jin's leftover bibimbap. V makes naengmyeon and gets Jungkook to cook pork belly for him. Jungkook and Suga work on music in the campervan. The members paint in their rooms while the rain falls. Suga continues working on music alone. Jimin, Jungkook, and RM play with water guns in the rain. Jin and V join them for a game of foot volleyball. RM works out in the gym while Jimin, Jungkook, and V shoot free throws in the rain. Jin makes kimchi-jeon.
13	5	"Permission to BTS"	November 12, 2021 (Weverse only)
Jin helps Suga prepare Hanwoo tenderloin for dinner. J-Hope and Jimin barbeque the meat outdoors. Suga makes beef yukhoe and tenderloin sandwiches. The members discuss their feelings during this season of the show while eating. After dinner, Suga watches V and Jungkook play a video game while the other members play Flinch. RM and Jungkook return to their rooms first. The other members light fireworks by the pool. J-Hope wakes early in the morning and goes for a walk before breakfast. Jin and Suga wake at midday and make vongole pasta and janchi-guksu for lunch. Jin wakes Jungkook. RM makes naengmyeon for lunch and Jin gives him the leftover guksu. V begins painting as soon as he wakes up. Jin makes more guksu for Jungkook and V. V makes hotteok for dessert. RM reads in the Study while Jin, Jungkook, and V play video games in the living room. V makes more hotteok for Jimin. Jin and J-Hope listen to an audiobook together. Jimin packs after waking up, spends time with RM, and plays the guitar; V finishes his paintings; Jin games in the PC room; Suga dismantles his studio setup in the Airstream; J-Hope and Jungkook look after Bam. Jin and Suga cook dak-galbi for the final dinner on the show. After eating, the members cleanup House A and finish packing. They gather by the Airstream to eat fried chicken, drink beer, and reminisce about their time spent during season two—they take several group photos together before leaving. The episode ends with a montage of clips from throughout the season interspersed with interview clips of each member saying what In the Soop means to them.

== Reception ==
Los Angeles Times writer Dakota Kim called In the Soop a "surprise" in comparison to other reality series the band has had. She wrote that the series "reveals another side of the fierce septet" through "serious heart-to-hearts" about how they were affected by the COVID-19 pandemic, while also providing "a view into rustic life, from the time-honored Korean tradition of cooking outdoors to learning how to fish." Claire P. Dodson of Teen Vogue described watching the series as "an extremely relaxing experience". BuzzFeed's Jenna Guillaume felt that "'healing'...perfectly encapsulates the viewing experience", and described the series as "the perfect show to match [BTS]", writing that it was "low-stakes but incredibly compelling in its simplicity." In a 2021 round-up of the band's various reality series over the years, Kayti Burt from Den of Geek called In The Soop "the gift that keeps on giving". She noted that the "much looser structure" of the series "allow[s] the band to relax a bit more", and wrote that "BTS has given us many gifts during the COVID-19 pandemic, but In the Soop may be the greatest." According to Twitter's year-end review, it was the eighth most-tweeted about show globally of 2021.

=== Ratings ===
BTS In the Soop aired on cable channel/pay TV network JTBC, which normally has a relatively smaller audience compared to free-to-air TV/public broadcasters such as KBS, SBS, MBC, and EBS.

==== Season 1 ====
Ep.	Original broadcast date	Average audience share
Ep.	Original broadcast date	Nielsen Korea (Nationwide)
1	August 19, 2020	1.3%
2	August 26, 2020	0.9%
3	September 2, 2020	0.9%
4	September 9, 2020	1.0%
5	September 16, 2020	0.9%
6	September 23, 2020	0.9%
7	September 30, 2020	1.0%
8	October 7, 2020	0.7%

==== Season 2 ====
Ep.	Original broadcast date	Average audience share
Ep.	Original broadcast date	Nielsen Korea (Nationwide)
1	October 15, 2021	1.4%
2	October 22, 2021	0.9%
3	October 29, 2021	1.0%
4	November 5, 2021	1.0%
The blue numbers represent the lowest ratings, while the red numbers represent the highest ratings.; Season 2's fifth episode was not aired on television so no ratings are available/included.

== Spin-offs ==
After BTS, In the Soop has gone on to feature K-pop group Seventeen in In the Soop SVT ver. for two seasons, and the celebrity friend group of Park Seo-joon, Park Hyung-sik, Choi Woo-shik, Peakboy, and V of BTS in In the Soop: Friendcation.
