= The Portrait =

The Portrait may refer to:

- The Portrait (Magritte), a 1935 painting by René Magritte
- "The Portrait" (short story), an 1835 short story by Nikolai Gogol
  - The Portrait (opera), a 1983 opera composed by Mieczysław Weinberg based on the short story
- "The Portrait" (song), a song by The Damned on their 1986 album Anything
- The Portrait (1915 film)
- The Portrait (1923 film), an Austrian-French silent film directed by Jacques Feyder
- The Portrait (1993 film), starring Gregory Peck and Lauren Bacall
- The Portrait (2023 film), a British film directed by Simon Ross
- Ang Larawan, also known as The Portrait, a 2017 Philippine musical film
- The Portrait (What We Do in the Shadows), an episode of the American TV series What We Do in the Shadows

== See also ==
- Portrait (disambiguation)
- The Portrait of a Lady (disambiguation)
