= Max Raptor =

Punk rock band from Burton upon Trent, England

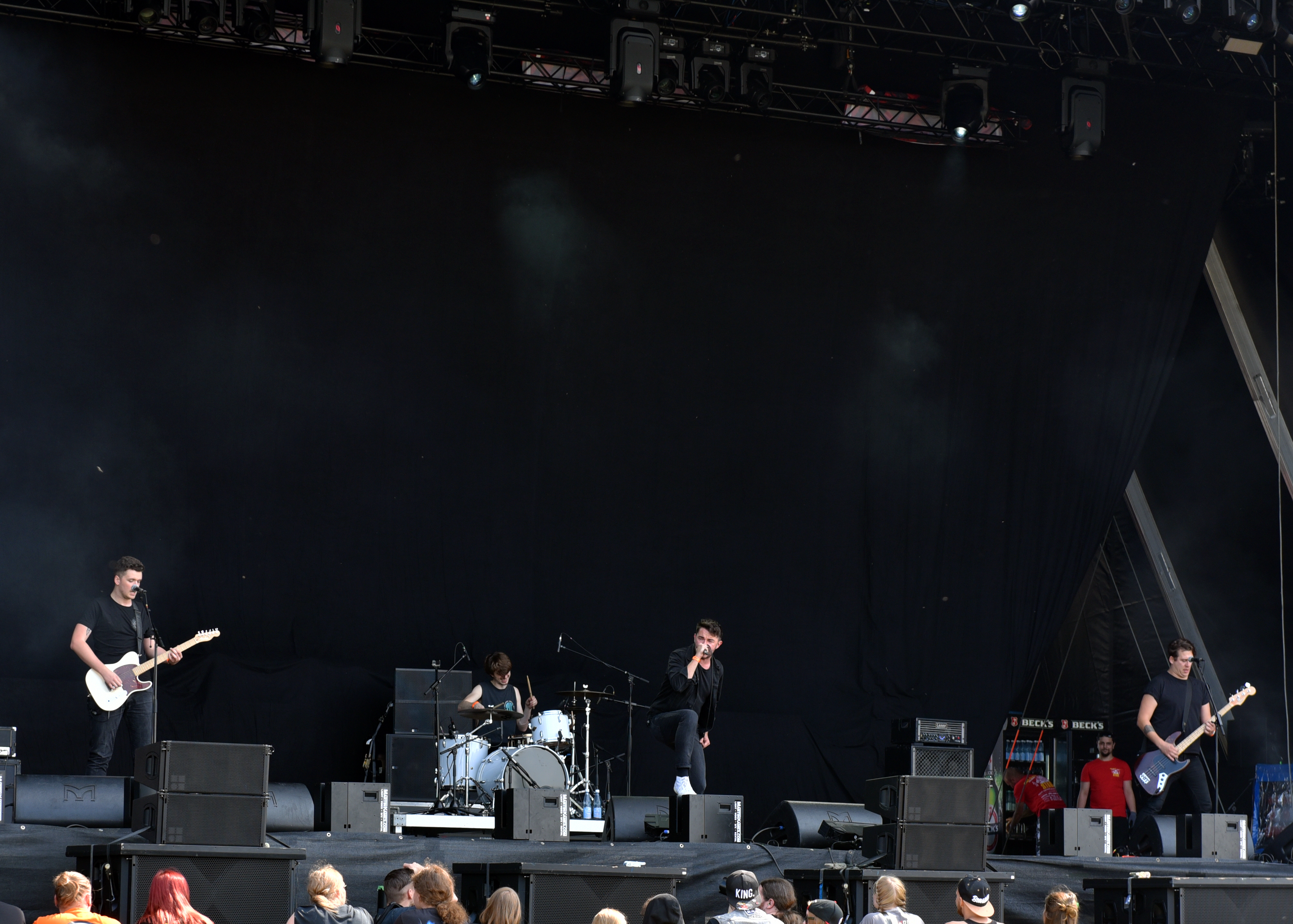

Background information
- Origin: Burton upon Trent, Midlands, England, UK
- Genres: Punk rock
- Years active: 2006–present
- Labels: Naim Edge, Hassle
- Members: Wil Ray; Matt Stevenson; Ben Winnington; Pete Reisner
- Past members: JB Willcox; Tom Garrett; Chris Gilbert
- Website: http://www.maxraptor.co.uk

Max Raptor are an English four-piece punk rock band from Burton upon Trent in the Midlands, England, formed in 2006. They have toured the UK and played two dates in 2009 with Canadian punk band Billy Talent and then toured 16 dates in 2010 with British punk band The Stranglers.

Their single "Breakers" from their forthcoming debut album was played for the first time on 13 June 2013 on BBC Radio 1's Zane Lowe show.

Max Raptor played Download Festival 2010 and played with Cage the Elephant, The Futureheads, Captain, Calvin Harris and Oceansize earlier in their career.

In August 2012, they played the BBC introducing Stage at the Reading and Leeds Festivals.

"The King is Dead" is the feature track and leads the global commercials for Xbox/PlayStation game, Dirt: Showdown 2012.

Max Raptor's first two singles were also released on Naim record label, "The Great & The Good" and "Ghosts" were recorded at Brighton Electric studios with Sam Bell, who has also recorded part of the Bloc Party album Intimacy plus new recordings for Weezer, Regina Spektor, Lost Alone, The Wombats and The Cars.

Max Raptor released their debut album Portraits on 11 April 2011. It was recorded by Dan Weller at Fortress Studios. Weller has produced the third Enter Shikari album A Flash Flood of Colour. Other bands on his CV include Rise to Remain, Sharks, Gallows, Johnny Truant, Malefice and Young Guns.

In December that year, Max Raptor played two dates with post-punk band New Model Army at Brixton Electric and Manchester Ritz Theatre.

Their next album, Mothers Ruin, was released on 30 September 2013, on Naim.

A four track EP entitled "Damage Appreciation" was released on 13 November 2015 on Hassle Records.

== Facebook campaign ==
A successful Facebook campaign led by James Halstead of the Gill and Beez Facebook page – a group which largely spearheaded the campaign in November 2011 along with pushes from Kerrang's Katie P bringing on other artists to support the cause – it resulted in Max Raptor agreeing to play a show in the bedroom of a fan, Barney Hall. This show was streamed on Max Raptor's Facebook page on 18 December and gathered attention from Kerrang! and Front. A comment made by several members during the show led to an official "WE ARE ALL BARNEY HALL" T-shirt being made available for a limited time.

== Members ==
=== Current ===
- Ben Winnington – Guitar
- Matt Stevenson- Bass Guitar
- Wil Ray – Vocals
- Pete Reisner – Drums

=== Former ===
- JB Willcox
- Tom Garrett
- Chris Gilbert

== Discography ==
=== Albums ===
- Portraits (2011)
- Mother's Ruin (2013)
- Max Raptor (2016)

=== EPs ===
- "Damage Appreciation" (2015)

=== Singles ===
- "Ghosts" (2010)
- "The Great & The Good" (2010)
- "The King is Dead" (2011)
- "Carolina" (2012)
- "Patron Saint (Of Nothing)" (2012)
- "Breakers" (2013)
- "England Breathes" (2013)
