= In the Soop: Friendcation =

South Korean reality series

- Series logo
- Also known as: In the Soop: Friendship Trip
- Hangul: 인더숲: 우정여행
- RR: In deo sup: ujeong yeohaeng
- MR: In tŏ sup: ujŏng yŏhaeng
- Genre: Reality series
- Starring: Peakboy; Park Seo-joon; Choi Woo-shik; Park Hyung-sik; V
- Country of origin: South Korea
- Original language: Korean
- No. of seasons: 1
- No. of episodes: 4

Original release
- Network: JTBC; Disney+
- Release: July 22 – August 12, 2022

Related
- BTS In the Soop

In the Soop: Friendcation (Korean: 인더숲: 우정여행; lit. 'In the Forest: Friendship Trip') is a South Korean reality show created by Hybe Corporation. A spin-off of the In the Soop series that originally featured BTS and then Seventeen, it stars Peakboy, Park Seo-joon, Choi Woo-shik, Park Hyung-sik, and V of BTS. Comprising four episodes, the show follows the fivesome as they embark on a four-day vacation trip together. It premiered on July 22, 2022, on the South Korean pay television network JTBC and global over-the-top streaming platform Disney+. Episodes aired first on JTBC, at 9PM KST, and were made available two hours later on Disney+. The final episode aired on August 12.

== Premise ==
The show depicts the travel story of actors Park Seo-joon, Choi Woo-shik and Park Hyung-sik, rapper Peakboy, and singer V of BTS, a group of five friends known as the "Wooga Squad" in the South Korean entertainment industry. After one of them makes a surprise suggestion, they set out on a friendship trip lasting four days and three nights. The series documents their candid daily life while together.

== Episodes ==
No. overall	No. in season	Title	Original release date
1	1	"A Sudden Trip"	July 22, 2022
The five friends meet at Hybe headquarters for a meal. They discuss the details of the trip—V was the one who suggested they do it in order to spend some time together—and what they will do while filming for the series. The day of the trip, Hyung-sik and Woo-shik have prior schedules so only V, Seo-joon, and Peakboy show up. Seo-joon drives them to Goseong, Gangwon Province. They eat mak-guksu for lunch at a local restaurant then head to a pension in the woods where they will be staying. After exploring all the rooms, the three unpack and get settled in. Tired from travelling they fall asleep. Later, V drives them to the supermarket for groceries. Seo-joon cooks steak and mashed potatoes for their first dinner. After eating, they play Alkkagi (a Korean board game). Then Woo-sik arrives.
2	2	"Letting Loose"	July 29, 2022
Hyung-shik finally arrives. He and Woo-shik eat steamed buns together early in the morning while everyone else is still asleep. The others eventually wake up and greet Hyung-shik then they all go back to sleep together. For breakfast, Seo-joon makes dumpling tteokguk and Peakboy brews coffee. Afterwards, they drive to the port in Gonghyeonjin and spend the day fishing out in the ocean. After returning to the pension, they eat some of the fish they caught. Later in the evening, they spend time in the indoor pool then eat their first dinner together as a fivesome outdoors—Seo-joon grills meat, V makes spicy noodles, and Woo-shik prepares beer can chicken.
3	3	"We're Happier Because We're Together"	August 5, 2022
The fivesome eat the beer can chicken while watching Woo-shik's drama Our Beloved Summer together, then sing karaoke, and talk late into the night—V cries after confessing he has many regrets about the past year—before going to sleep. In the morning, Woo-shik cooks breakfast for everyone while Peakboy makes coffee. After breakfast, Peakboy and Seo-joon workout together; Woo-shik, Hyung-sik and V spend time in the sauna; Seo-joon teaches them how to apply makeup. They order Chinese food for lunch then drive to the beach after eating.
4	4	"Good Mistake"	August 12, 2022
They visit an ice skating rink after the beach. Back at the pension, everyone helps cook dinner—they make dak-bokkeum-tang and kimchi-bokkeum-bap. While eating, the five friends reminisce about old memories and discuss potential future trips. They spend the rest of the night talking with each other until they fall asleep. Hyung-sik leaves early the next morning due to his schedule. The remaining four have breakfast together then pack up. Seo-joon drives them back to Seoul. A bonus scene at the end of the episode shows the fivesome recording the series' theme song "Polaroid" in Peakboy's studio.

== Reception ==
In the Soop: Friendcation ranked first in Disney+ Korea's 'Top 10 Overall' and 'Top 10 TV Shows' as well as 'Top Ranked TV Shows' for 10 consecutive days. The series was among the top three most-watched releases in Asia, additionally ranking at number one in Indonesia and Singapore. Following the broadcast of its first episode in Japan, the series claimed first place in all genre rankings on Disney+ and consistently topped the TV show category, ranking first for 25 consecutive days as of August 18, 2022. In an interview with Deadline Hollywood in January 2023, Carol Choi, the managing director of Disney+ Japan and executive vice president of Original Content Strategy for the Asia Pacific region, stated that the series had "become one of the most popular shows" on the platform.

=== Ratings ===
The series aired on cable channel/pay TV network JTBC, which normally has a relatively smaller audience compared to free-to-air TV/public broadcasters such as KBS, SBS, MBC, and EBS.

Ep.	Original broadcast date	Average audience share
Ep.	Original broadcast date	Nielsen Korea (Nationwide)
1	July 22, 2022	1.3%
2	July 29, 2022	1.1%
3	August 5, 2022	0.9%
4	August 12, 2022	0.6%
The blue number represents the lowest rating, while the red number represents the highest rating.
