= American Portraits =

American anthology radio program (1938–1951)

American Portraits was an anthology radio program which aired on NBC from 1938 to 1951.

== Subjects ==
Premiering February 5, 1938, with the life of Andrew Jackson, the show usually featured dramatic biographical profiles of famous American historical figures. Other subjects included William Penn (February 12, 1938), Walt Whitman (February 25, 1938), Alexander Hamilton (March 12, 1938), Ralph Waldo Emerson (March 26, 1938), Thomas Jefferson (April 9, 1938), Harriet Beecher Stowe (April 16, 1938), Mark Twain (on April 23, 1938), Augustus Saint-Gaudens (April 30, 1938), Benjamin Franklin, Abraham Lincoln, and Louis Agassiz. A West Point anniversary program was presented March 19, 1938.

== Credits ==
Graham McNamee was the narrator, Raymond Scudder wrote the scripts, and Joseph Hauntie was the music conductor for American Portraits. For the show's eight-week summer run in 1951, Ben Grauer was the show's announcer, George Faulkner wrote the scripts, and Dee Englebach was its director and producer.
