= Yonghwasan =

Mountain in Gangwon-do in South Korea

Coordinates: 38°02′14″N 127°45′11″E

Highest point
- Elevation: 878.4 m (2,882 ft)

Geography
- Location: South Korea

Korean name
- Hangul: 용화산
- Hanja: 龍華山
- RR: Yonghwasan
- MR: Yonghwasan

Yonghwasan (Korean: 용화산) is a mountain in Chuncheon and Hwacheon County, Gangwon Province, South Korea. It has an elevation of 878.4 m (2,882 ft).

== See also ==
- List of mountains in Korea
