= Portrait (TV program) =

Canadian musical variety television program

- Genre: Variety
- Country of origin: Canada
- Original language: English
- No. of seasons: 1

Production
- Producers: Don Brown; Bill Davis; Terry Kyne; Paddy Sampson; Dave Thomas
- Running time: 30 minutes

Original release
- Network: CBC Television
- Release: 8 July – 9 September 1965

Portrait is a Canadian musical variety show that aired on CBC Television in 1965.

== Premise ==
Portrait was a spin-off from segments of the local A La Carte series on CBLT Toronto. Musicians featured during the series included Lucio Agostini, Ed Bickert and Maurice Bolyer. One episode, "The Conformists", was a comedic work starring various performers such as Paul Soles.

== Scheduling ==
This half-hour program was broadcast on Thursdays at 8:30 p.m. (Eastern) from 8 July to 9 September 1965.
