= Portraits (Max Raptor album) =

Studio album by Max Raptor
- Released: (United Kingdom) 11 April 2011
- Genre: Punk rock
- Length: 26:41
- Label: Naim Edge
- Producer: Dan Weller

Max Raptor chronology
| Portraits (2011) | Mother's Ruin (2013) |

Singles from Portraits
- 1. "The King Is Dead" Released: 10 August 2011; 2. "Carolina" Released: 19 March 2012; 3. "Patron Saint (Of Nothing)" Released: 17 August 2012

Professional ratings
Review scores
| Source | Rating |
|---|---|
| Alter The Press | 4/5 stars |
| Rock Sound | 8/10 stars |
| Ultimate Guitar | 8/10 stars |

Portraits is the debut release from English punk rock band Max Raptor. It was released on Naim Edge Records in April 2011.

== Track listing ==
All music is composed by Max Raptor

| No. | Title | Length |
|---|---|---|
| 1. | "The King Is Dead" | 3:37 |
| 2. | "The Great & The Good" | 3:12 |
| 3. | "Beasts" | 3:03 |
| 4. | "Obey The Whips" | 3:46 |
| 5. | "Carolina" | 3:36 |
| 6. | "Patron Saint (Of Nothing)" | 3:07 |
| 7. | "Ghosts" | 2:58 |
| 8. | "The Alarm" | 3:25 |
| Total length: | | 26:41 |

== Personnel ==
- Wil Ray - Vocals
- JB Willcox - Guitar
- Tom Garrett - Bass
- Matt Stevenson - Drums
