= An American Portrait =

- Genre: Documentary
- Country of origin: United States
- Original language: English
- No. of seasons: 2

Production
- Producer: Alex Pomansanof
- Running time: 1:00
- Production company: CBS Entertainment Productions

Original release
- Network: CBS
- Release: September 24, 1984 – October 28, 1986

An American Portrait is a series of historical interstitial programs that aired on CBS from September 9, 1984, until October 28, 1986. Each episode opened with the centennial introduction In Celebration: 1886–1986, followed by a one-minute biography of the subject. Each episode was presented by a different celebrity.

== List of episodes ==
=== Season 1 ===
Airdate	Subject	Presenter
October 4, 1984	Charles Brace	Danny Kaye
November 13, 1984	Joseph Glidden	Kenny Rogers
December 5, 1984	Ray Kurzweil	Mel Tormé
1985	Louise Tracy	Gerald McRaney
1985	Sarah Caldwell	David Ogden Stiers
1985	George Eastman	Billy Crystal
1985	Julia Lathrop	Colleen Juniors
January 3, 1985	Viola Liuzzo	Marlo Thomas
January 23, 1985	Florence Kelley	Madeline Kahn
February 22, 1985	Trevor Ferrell	Bernadette Peters
February 22, 1985	Rachel Carson	Anne Jackson
April 15, 1985	Jane Addams	Joanne Woodward

=== Season 2 ===
Airdate	Subject	Presenter
October 1985	Dr. Hugh Morgan Hill	Hal Holbrook
October 30, 1985	Antonia Pantoja	Teri Garr
December 10, 1985	W.C. Handy	Bob Fosse
1985	Harriet Monroe	Jack Kemp
1985	Greene Black	Harvey Korman
1986	Matthew Henson	Melissa Gilbert
January 29, 1986	John Shaw Billings	Jill St. John
