= Peakboy =

South Korean rapper (born 1989)

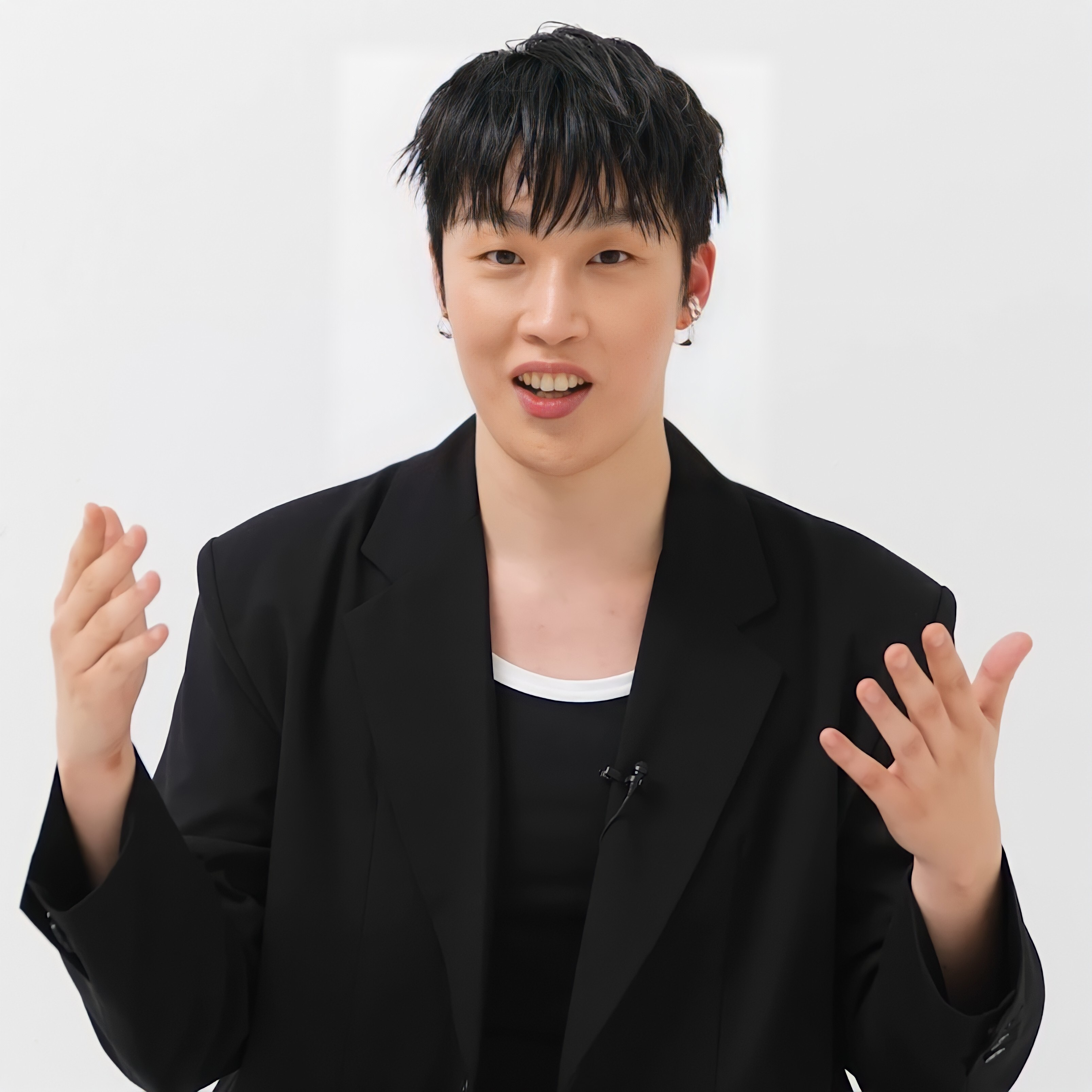
- Peakboy in 2022

Background information
- Birth name: Kwon Sung-hwan
- Born: May 27, 1989 (age 36); Incheon, South Korea
- Genres: Hip hop; R&B; electronic
- Occupations: Rapper; singer; songwriter; record producer
- Instrument: Vocals
- Years active: 2012–present
- Labels: Neuron Music

Korean name
- Hangul: 권성환
- RR: Gwon Seonghwan
- MR: Kwŏn Sŏnghwan
- IPA: [kwʌn sʌŋβwan]

Kwon Sung-hwan (Korean: 권성환; born May 27, 1989), known professionally as Peakboy (픽보이 [pʰik̚.po.i]), is a South Korean rapper, singer-songwriter and record producer. He released his debut single "Gin & Tonic" in 2017 via SoundCloud and first mini-album Portrait the following year. Since signing with Neuron Music, he has released two additional mini-albums and numerous stand-alone singles.

== Early life ==
Peakboy was born Kwon Sung-hwan on May 27, 1989, the older of two sons. He lived in Gyeyang District, Incheon, where he attended Annam High School. He and Park Yong-in of Urban Zakapa attended the same hagwon, and Peakboy took interest in music upon seeing Park use a music program. He joined a company as a trainee and intended to become a vocalist by age 22 before giving up. He enlisted in mandatory military service and was discharged in 2016. After completing his service, he deliberated between being a pop music composer or a self-produced artist.

== Career ==
Peakboy came up with his stage name the day before registering it with the Korea Copyright Commission. "Peak" refers to the peak point which arises when making music, and "boy" was attached due to its regular usage in the monikers of foreign record producers. Early in his career, Peakboy composed music for girl group Hello Venus. He would go on to take part in songwriting and production for other musicians, including on Urban Zakapa's "Another Me" (2015) and Kkal & Maxx's debut record Caffe in the Morning (2016). He also produced tracks for the fifth and sixth seasons of the rap competition series Show Me the Money. Peakboy joined the music crew Juicy Wave after having it suggested to him by rapper Kyu Young.

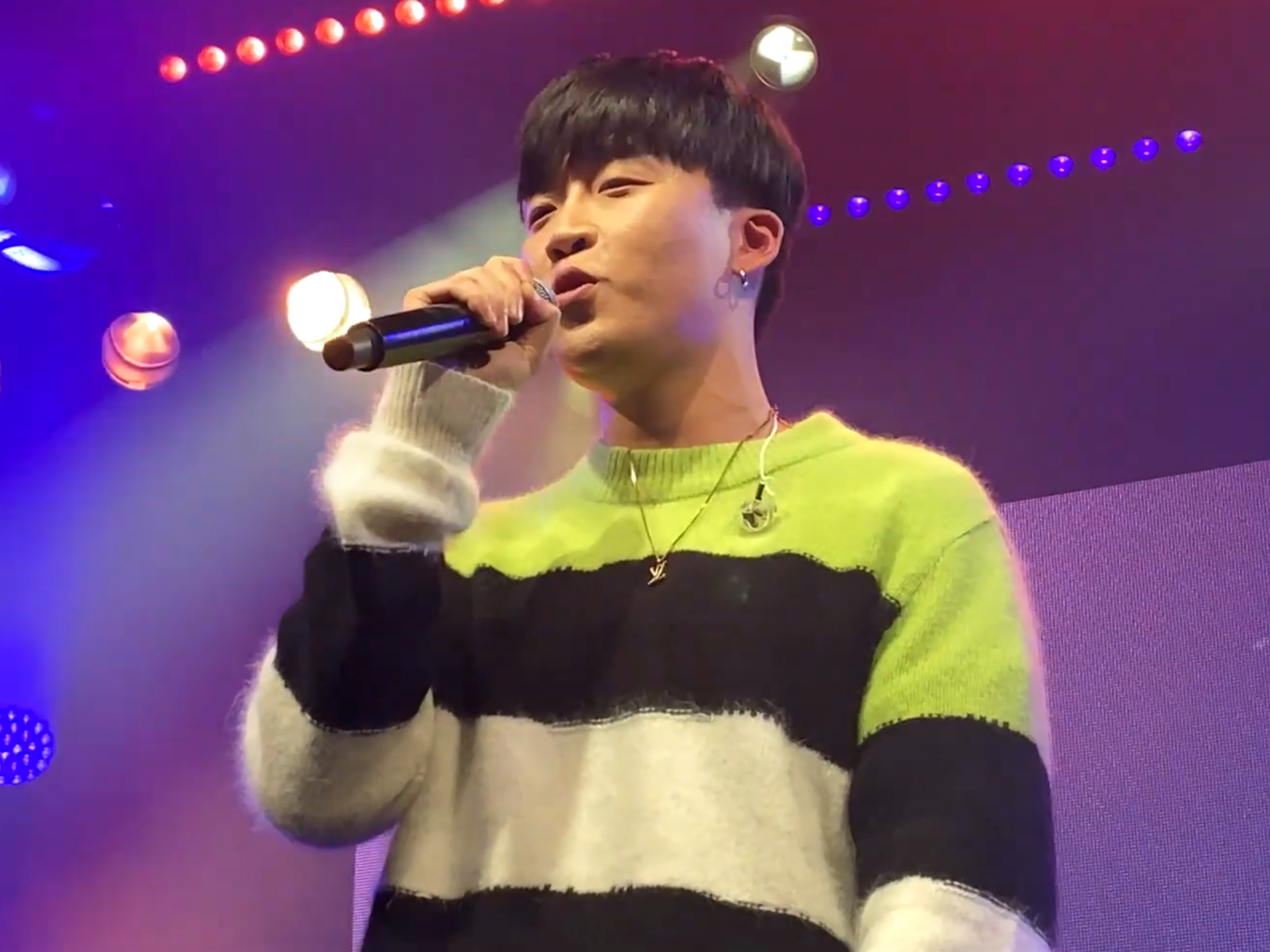
Peakboy performing in December 2019

In 2017, Peakboy uploaded his debut single "Gin & Tonic" onto audio sharing website SoundCloud and he began receiving contract offers from various companies. His first mini-album Portrait and its lead single "Shame" featuring George were released on March 14, 2018. Peakboy signed an exclusive contract with Neuron Music and released the single album 05/27 through the record label on August 23, headed by the electronic hip-hop track "Birthday" with Hanhae as its featured guest. Peakboy penned the track in four days, which was influenced by his stay in the United States two months earlier. He released his second mini-album Us on April 11, 2019. "Kelly", released from the single album Frola, samples "Doowap" by labelmate Paul Kim. Its accompanying music video published the following month. By the end of the year, he held his first concert with Bibi on Christmas Eve.

Peakboy's third mini-album Loop, fronted by the lead single "Diet" featuring Wheein of Mamamoo, was released on August 18, 2020. From the following month, he hosted three episode of his radio program entitled Peakboy's Arcade on Naver Now. In early 2021, he accompanied Kim to Jeju Island for a music video shoot. Peakboy was inspired by the trip and the ongoing COVID-19 pandemic to write "Anywhere". A song about traveling, the R&B digital single was released on April 20. On July 25, the electronic hip-hop single "Gyopo Hairstyle" was issued. Its music video features cameos by model Han Hyun-min, actors Choi Woo-shik, Park Seo-joon, Park Hyung-sik, and singer V of BTS.

== Musical style ==
Peakboy's song lyrics deal with his thoughts and experiences of everyday life. His lyricism has been noted for being blunt and candid, while his music has been described as trendy and original. The foundations of his work are classified as electronic and black music. In terms of voice type, he is a baritone. Writing for Atstar1 magazine, editor Hwang Yeon-do described Peakboy as one of the few musicians with a good musical tone, skilled rapping, and talented capabilities as a singer-songwriter. Peakboy cites You Hee-yeol, Yoon Jong-shin, and Yoon Sang as his role models.

== Discography ==
=== Albums ===
==== Extended plays ====
Title	Details
Portrait	Released: March 14, 2018; Label: Neuron Music, NHN Bugs; Format: CD, digital download
Us	Released: April 11, 2019; Label: Neuron Music, Kakao; Format: CD, digital download
Loop	Released: August 18, 2020; Label: Neuron Music, Kakao; Format: CD, digital download

=== Singles ===
==== As lead artist ====
Title	Year	Peak chart positions		Album
Title	Year	KOR		Album
Title	Year	Gaon Digital Chart	K-pop Hot 100	Album
"Gin & Tonic"	2017	—	—	Juicy Wave
"Shame" (featuring George)	2018	—	—	Portrait
"Birthday" (featuring Hanhae)	2018	—	—	05/27
"The Same" (여전해; Yeojeonhae)	2019	—	—	Us
"Kelly"	2019	—	—	Frola
"Tic Tac Toe" (눈치; Nunchi) (with Paul Kim and Heize)	2019	72	53	Yoo Flash
"MMM" (애매해; Aemaehae)	2019	—	—	Non-album single
"Walk"	2020	—	—	Non-album single
"Diet" (featuring Wheein of Mamamoo)	2020	—	—	Loop
"Late Night"	2020	—	—	Non-album single
"Anywhere"	2021	—	—	Non-album single
"Gyopo Hairstyle" (교포머리; Gyopo Meori)	2021	—	—	Non-album single
"She Is"	2022	—	—	Non-album single

==== As featured artist ====
Title	Year	Album
"Paparazzi" (Mac Curly featuring Peakboy)	2019	How Can I Become Famous
"Twinkle" (Amin featuring Peakboy)	2019	Non-album single
"Star" (별; Byeol) (El Rune featuring Peakboy)	2019	Shooting Star
"Snow Flower" (V featuring Peakboy)	2020	Non-album single
"I'm OK" (암오케; Amoke) (Davii featuring Peakboy)	2021	Non-album single
"Poom" (품; Pum) (Choi Wook-shik featuring Peakboy)	2021	Non-album single
"Hands on Me" (Kissxs featuring Peakboy)	2021	Non-album single
"Chance" (Haan and Chan featuring Peakboy)	2022	Haan X Chan : Synergy

== Filmography ==
=== Television shows ===
Year	Title	Role	Notes	Ref.
2019	Hangout with Yoo	Cast	4 episodes	
2022	In the Soop: Friendship Trip	Cast Member		
2022	Listen-Up	Regular Member		

=== Radio shows ===
Year	Title	Role	Notes	Ref.
2020	Pickboy's Arcade	Host	3 episodes	
