= A Portrait (John Denver album) =

John Denver - A Portrait

Compilation album by John Denver
- Released: 1994
- Genre: Folk
- Label: Windstar

John Denver - A Portrait is an album made by Windstar Records and features the music of John Denver. A similarly named Portrait was released by BMG in 1999. The BMG release was a two-disc set.

John Denver: A Portrait is also the name of a VHS documentary about his life, released in 1994.

== Track listing ==
1. "Is It Love"
2. "Rocky Mountain High"
3. "Two Different Directions"
4. "For You"
5. "Calypso"
6. "Annie's Song"
7. "Seasons Of The Heart"
8. "Sweet Surrender"
9. "Whispering Jesse"
10. "Shanghai Breezes"
11. "Sunshine on My Shoulders"
12. "The Flower That Shattered The Stone"
13. "Country Girl In Paris"
14. "Take Me Home, Country Roads"
15. "Like A Sad Song"
16. "Never A Doubt"
17. "Flying For Me"
18. "Eagles & Horses"
19. "Sing Australia" (bonus track)

== Charts ==
Weekly chart performance for A Portrait
| Chart (1994) | Peak position |
|---|---|
| Australian Albums (ARIA) | 38 |

== Certification ==
| Region | Certification | Certified units/sales |
|---|---|---|
| Australia (ARIA) | Gold | 35,000^{^} |
^{^} Shipments figures based on certification alone.
