= BTS videography =

South Korean boy band music videos

BTS video discography
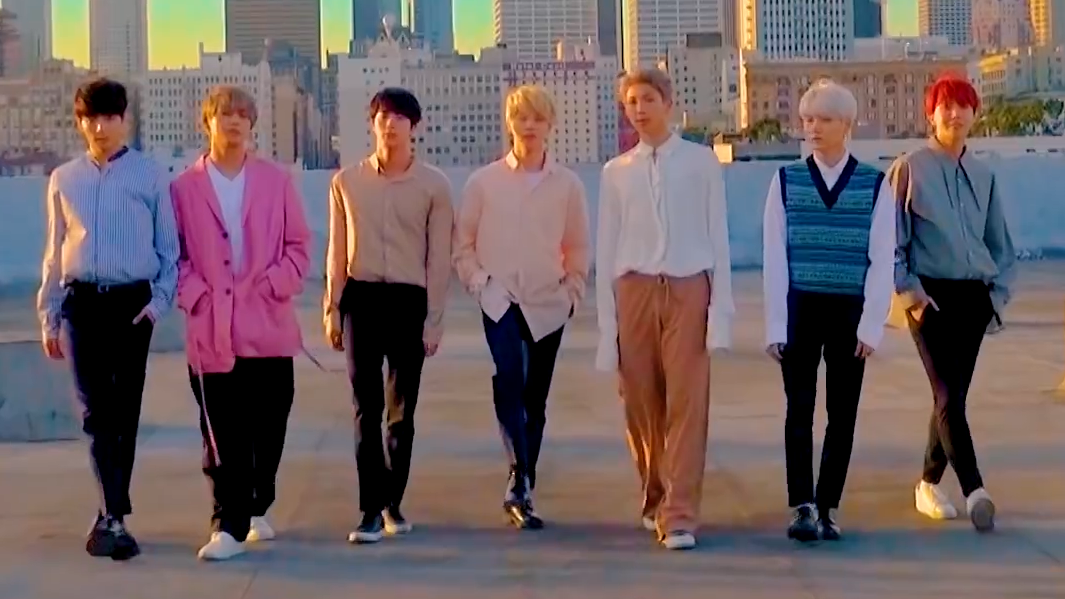
- BTS in a photoshoot in Los Angeles, November 2017
- Video albums: 49
- Music videos: 72
- Films: 4
- Television: 7

South Korean boy band BTS debuted on the music scene in June 2013. They have since released or featured in 72 music videos, and released 49 video albums. Known for their high quality music videos—and accompanying choreography therein—the band have achieved multiple world records with several of these, additionally winning various domestic and international awards for them. They have also appeared in commercials for brands such as Puma, Fila, and Samsung, among others.

BTS promoted the release of their debut single album 2 Cool 4 Skool (2013) with two music videos, for the singles "No More Dream" and "We Are Bulletproof Pt.2". This was followed by the release of their debut extended play (EP) O!RUL8,2? in September, which yielded the single "N.O" and an accompanying music video. In 2014, the music video for the band's single "Danger" garnered significant attention for its strong choreography; in particular, the neck-grab and shoulder move. The subsequent remix of the single's Japanese version, with Vietnamese pianist Thanh Bui, marked the first time another artist appeared in a BTS music video. In 2015, the band began their BTS Universe storyline with the release of the "I Need U" music video.

In Japan, BTS is the best-selling foreign artist of all-time for video releases, with eight of their concert recordings achieving number-one on Oricon's overall DVD and Blu-ray sales chart, as of October 2022. These recordings have all received gold certification from the Recording Industry Association of Japan (RIAJ) for selling over 100,000 copies each. The band's first video release to be certified was the 2019 BTS World Tour: Love Yourself ~Japan Edition~ DVD, which also became their first to attain platinum certification, in July 2022, for surpassing 250,000 sales.

== Music videos ==
Key
†	Denotes music videos certified by Big Hit as part of the Bangtan Universe

=== 2010s ===
Title	Year	Other performer(s) credited	Director(s)	Ref.
"No More Dream" (노 모어 드림)	2013	None	Hong Won-ki	
"No More Dream" (Dance Version)	2013	None	Hong Won-ki	
"We Are Bulletproof Pt2" (위 아 불렛프루프 Pt.2)	2013	None	Hong Won-ki	
"N.O" (엔.오) (Note: abbreviation for "No Offense")	2013	None	Hong Won-ki	
"Boy In Luv" (상남자)	2014	None	Yongseok Choi and Edie Ko	
"Boy In Luv" (상남자) (Dance Version)	2014	None	Yongseok Choi and Edie Ko	
"Just One Day (하루만)	2014	None	Lumpens	
"Just One Day" (Dance Version)	2014	None	Lumpens	
"Just One Day" (Facial Expression Version)	2014	None	Lumpens	
"Just One Day" (One-Take Version)	2014	None	Lumpens	
"No More Dream" (Japanese version)	2014	None	Yongseok Choi	
"Boy in Luv" (Japanese Version)	2014	None	Yongseok Choi	
"Danger"	2014	None	Yongseok Choi	
"War of Hormone" (호르몬 전쟁)	2014	None	Hong Won-ki	
"Danger" (Japanese Version)	2014	None	Edie Ko	
"Danger (Mo-Blue-Mix)"	2014	Thanh Bui	Unknown	
"I Need U"†	2015	None	Lumpens	
"I Need U" (Original Version)†	2015	None	Yongseok Choi	
"For You"	2015	None	Hong Won-ki	
"For You" (Dance Version)	2015	None	Hong Won-ki	
"Dope" (쩔어)	2015	None	Woogie Kim	
"Run"†	2015	None	Yongseok Choi and Edie Ko	
"I Need U" (Japanese Version)"†	2015	None	Edie Ko	
"Run" (Japanese Version)†	2016	None	Lumpens	
"Epilogue: Young Forever"†	2016	None	Woogie Kim	
"Fire" (불타오르네)	2016	None	Lumpens	
"Fire" (불타오르네) (Dance Version)	2016	None	Lumpens	
"Save Me"	2016	None	Woogie Kim	
"Blood Sweat & Tears" (피 땀 눈물)†	2016	None	Lumpens	
"Spring Day" (봄날)	2017	None	Lumpens	
"Not Today"	2017	None	Woogie Kim	
"Not Today" (Choreography Version)	2017	None	Woogie Kim	
"Blood Sweat & Tears" (血、汗、涙) (Japanese Version)†	2017	None	Yongseok Choi	
"Come Back Home"	2017	None	Hong Won-ki	
"DNA"	2017	None	Yongseok Choi	
"Mic Drop (Steve Aoki Remix)"	2017	Steve Aoki	Woogie Kim	
"Mic Drop" (Japanese Version) [Short Version]	2017	None	Woogie Kim	
"Mic Drop" (Japanese Version)	2017	None	Woogie Kim	
"With Seoul"	2017	None	Unknown	
"Fake Love"†	2018	None	Yongseok Choi	
"Fake Love" (Extended Version)†	2018	None	Yongseok Choi	
"Idol"	2018	None	Yongseok Choi	
"Idol" (alternate version)	2018	Nicki Minaj	Yongseok Choi	
"Airplane pt.2" (Japanese Version)	2018	None	Yongseok Choi	
"Waste It on Me"	2018	Steve Aoki	Joe Hahn	
"Boy with Luv" (작은 것들을 위한 시)	2019	Halsey	Yongseok Choi	
"Boy with Luv" (작은 것들을 위한 시) (ARMY with Luv Version)	2019	Halsey	Yongseok Choi	
"Heartbeat"	2019	None	Unknown	
"Lights"	2019	None	Doori Kwak	
"Make It Right"	2019	Lauv	Guzza	
"Make It Right" (Vertical Version)	2019	None	Guzza	

=== 2020s ===
Title	Year	Other performer(s) credited	Director(s)	Ref.
"'ON' Kinetic Manifesto Film : Come Prima"	2020	None	Yongseok Choi	
"On"	2020	None	Yongseok Choi	
"Who" (Official visualiser)	2020	Lauv	—N/a	
"Black Swan"	2020	None	Yongseok Choi and Guzza	
"We are Bulletproof: the Eternal"	2020	None	Wonmo Seong	
"Stay Gold"	2020	None	Ko Yoo Jeong	
"Dynamite"	2020	None	Yongseok Choi and Yoon Jihye	
"Dynamite (B-side)"	2020	None	Yongseok Choi and Yoon Jihye	
"Dynamite ('70s remix)"	2020	None	Yongseok Choi and Yoon Jihye	
"Dynamite (Choreography ver.)"	2020	None	Yongseok Choi and Yoon Jihye	
"Life Goes On"	2020	None	Jeon Jungkook, Yongseok Choi, and Yoon Jihye	
"Life Goes On: on my pillow"	2020	None	Jeon Jungkook, Yongseok Choi, and Yoon Jihye	
"Life Goes On: in the forest"	2020	None	Jeon Jungkook, Yongseok Choi, and Yoon Jihye	
"Life Goes On: like an arrow"	2020	None	Jeon Jungkook, Nu Kim, Yongseok Choi, and Yoon Jihye	
"Film Out"	2021	None	Yongseok Choi	
"Butter"	2021	None	Yongseok Choi	
"Butter (Hotter Remix)"	2021	None	Yongseok Choi	
"Butter (Cooler Remix)"	2021	None	Yongseok Choi	
"Butter (Sweeter Remix)"	2021	None	Yongseok Choi	
"Permission to Dance"	2021	None	Yongseok Choi and Woogie Kim	
"Permission to Dance" (Shorts Challenge ver.)	2021	None	—N/a	
"My Universe"	2021	Coldplay	Dave Meyers	
"Yet to Come (The Most Beautiful Moment)"	2022	None	Yongseok Choi	
"Yet to Come (The Most Beautiful Moment)" Special MV @ BTS Island: In The Seom	2022	None	—N/a	
"Yet To Come (feat. #MyBTStory)"	2022	None	—N/a	
"Bad Decisions"	2022	Benny Blanco and Snoop Dogg	Ben Sinclair	
"Bad Decisions"	2022	Benny Blanco and Snoop Dogg	Lachlan Turczan	
"Yet To Come (Hyundai Ver.)"	2022	None	Hanki GOH	
"Swim"	2026	None	Tanu Muiño	
"2.0"	2026	None	Hangyeol Lee	
"Hooligan"	2026	None	Hannah Lux Davis	
"Merry Go Round"	2026	None	Giseong Jun	
"Normal"	2026	None	Tanu Muiño	

=== Other videos ===
Title	Year	Director(s)	Ref.
"Debut Trailer"	2013	Unknown	
"O!RUL8,2? Comeback Trailer"	2013	Unknown	
"Skool Luv Affair 'Skool Luv Affair' Comeback Trailer"	2014	Unknown	
"DARK & WILD 'What Am I To You' Comeback Trailer"	2014	Unknown	
"2014 LIVE TRILOGY: EPISODE II. The Red Bullet Teaser"	2015	Unknown	
"2015 BTS LIVE TRILOGY: EPISODE I. BTS Begins Official Teaser"	2015	Unknown	
"화양연화 pt.1 '花樣年華' Comeback Trailer"	2015	Unknown	
"화양연화 on stage: prologue"†	2015	Unknown	
"화양연화 pt.2 'Never Mind' Comeback Trailer"	2015	Unknown	
"WINGS Short Film #1 BEGIN"†	2016	Yongseok Choi	
"WINGS Short Film #2 LIE"†	2016	Yongseok Choi	
"WINGS Short Film #3 STIGMA"†	2016	Yongseok Choi	
"WINGS Short Film #4 FIRST LOVE"†	2016	Yongseok Choi	
"WINGS Short Film #5 REFLECTION"†	2016	Yongseok Choi	
"WINGS Short Film #6 MAMA"†	2016	Yongseok Choi	
"WINGS Short Film #7 AWAKE"†	2016	Yongseok Choi	
"WINGS 'Boy Meets Evil' Comeback Trailer"	2016	GDW	
"2017 BTS live Trilogy Episode III. The Wings Tour Trailer"	2016	Unknown	
"Love Yourself Highlight Reel '起'"†	2017	Yongseok Choi	
"Love Yourself Highlight Reel '承'"†	2017	Yongseok Choi	
"Love Yourself Highlight Reel '轉'"†	2017	Yongseok Choi	
"Love Yourself Highlight Reel '起承轉结'"†	2017	Yongseok Choi	
"LOVE YOURSELF 承 Her 'Serendipity' Comeback Trailer"	2017	Yongseok Choi and Lee WonJu	
"LOVE MYSELF Campaign Video"	2017	Unknown	
"Euphoria: Theme of Love Yourself 起 'Wonder'"†	2018	Yongseok Choi	
"LOVE YOURSELF 轉 Tear 'Singularity' Comeback Trailer"	2018	Yongseok Choi	
"LOVE YOURSELF 結 Answer 'Epiphany' Comeback Trailer"†	2018	Yongseok Choi	
"MAP OF THE SOUL : PERSONA 'Persona' Comeback Trailer"	2019	Yongseok Choi	
"LOVE MYSELF Global Campaign Video"	2019	Unknown	
"MAP OF THE SOUL : 7 'Interlude : Shadow' Comeback Trailer"	2020	Oui Kim	
" 'Black Swan' Art Film performed by MN Dance Company"	2020	YongSeok Choi	
"MAP OF THE SOUL : 7 'Outro : Ego' Comeback Trailer"	2020	YooJeong Ko	
'아리랑 (ARIRANG)' Animation Trailer: What is your love song?	2026	Hur Sungwhe	

== Albums ==
=== Live video albums ===
Title	Album details	Peak chart positions		Sales	Certifications
Title	Album details	JPN		Sales	Certifications
Title	Album details	DVD	BD	Sales	Certifications
1st Japan Showcase –Next Stage– in Zepp Tokyo	Released: August 27, 2014 (JPN); Label: Big Hit, Pony Canyon; Format: DVD	—	—	—N/a	—N/a
1st Japan Tour 2015 Wake Up: Open Your Eyes	Released: May 20, 2015 (JPN); Labels: Big Hit, Pony Canyon; Format: 2-DVD, BD	8	6	JPN: 8,121	—N/a
2015 BTS Live 화양연화 on Stage Concert DVD	Released: February 23, 2016; Label: Big Hit; Format: 3-DVD + Photobook	—	—	25,000	—N/a
2015 BTS Live <花様年華 on stage> ~Japan Edition~ at Yokohama Arena	Released: March 15, 2016 (JPN); Labels: Big Hit, Pony Canyon; Format: 2-DVD, Blu-ray	6	5	JPN: 16,597	—N/a
2016 BTS Live <花様年華 on stage：Epilogue> ~Japan Edition~	Released: January 18, 2017 (JPN); Labels: Big Hit, Pony Canyon; Format: 2 DVDs + Photobook	2	3	JPN: 23,565	—N/a
2016 BTS Live 화양연화 on Stage: Epilogue Concert DVD	Released: January 18, 2017; Label: Big Hit; Format: 3 DVDs + Photobook	—	—	—N/a	—N/a
2017 BTS Live Trilogy Episode III The Wings Tour in Seoul	Released: December 1, 2017; Label: Big Hit; Format: DVD + Photobook	—	—	KOR: 30,464	—N/a
2017 BTS Live Trilogy Episode III The Wings Tour ~ Japan Edition ~	Released: December 27, 2017; Labels: Big Hit, Universal; Format: 2-DVD, Blu-ray (both w/ Photobook)	2	1	JPN: 80,685	—N/a
2017 BTS Live Trilogy Episode III The Wings Tour in Japan –Special Edition– at Kyocera Dome	Released: July 11, 2018 (JPN); Labels: Big Hit, Universal; Format: DVD, Blu-ray (both w/ Photobook)	1	3	JPN: 85,308	—N/a
BTS World Tour: Love Yourself in Seoul	Released: March 27, 2019; Label: Big Hit; Format: DVD, Blu-ray (both w/ Photobook)	1	1	JPN: 57,099	—N/a
BTS World Tour: Love Yourself in New York	Released: May 27, 2019; Label: Big Hit; Format: DVD, Blu-ray (both w/ Photobook)	—	—	—N/a	—N/a
BTS World Tour: Love Yourself in Europe	Released: May 27, 2019; Label: Big Hit; Format: DVD, Blu-ray (both w/ Photobook)	—	—	—N/a	—N/a
BTS World Tour: Love Yourself ~Japan Edition~	Released: October 9, 2019; Label: Big Hit, Universal; Format: DVD, Blu-ray (both w/ Photobook)	1	2	JPN: 111,529	RIAJ: Platinum
BTS World Tour - Love Yourself: Speak Yourself in Sao Paulo	Released: December 30, 2019; Label: Big Hit Three Sixty & Play; Format: DVD + Photobook	3	—	JPN: 13,157	—N/a
BTS World Tour 'Love Yourself: Speak Yourself' – Japan Edition	Released: April 15, 2020; Label: Big Hit Three Sixty; Format: DVD, Blu-ray (both w/ Photobook)	1	1	JPN: 118,426	—N/a
BTS World Tour 'Love Yourself: Speak Yourself' London	Released: September 24, 2020 (DVD) / October 21, 2020 (Blu-ray); Label: Big Hit Three Sixty, Play; Format: DVD, Blu-ray (both w/ Photobook)	2	4	JPN: 26,722	—N/a
BTS Map of the Soul ON:E	Released: September 23, 2021 (DVD) / October 27, 2021 (Blu-ray) (JPN); Label: Big Hit, Hybe, Play; Format: DVD, Blu-ray (both w/ Photobook)	1	1	JPN: 228,000	RIAJ: Gold
BTS World Tour 'Love Yourself : Speak Yourself' [The Final]	Released: October 25, 2022 (DVD) / November 30, 2022 (Blu-ray); Label: Big Hit, Hybe, Play; Format: DVD, Blu-ray (both w/ Photobook)	1	1	JPN: 102,480	RIAJ: Gold
BTS Permission to Dance on Stage in the U.S.	Released: November 27, 2023; Label: Big Hit, Hybe, Play; Format: Digital + Photobook	—	—	—N/a	—N/a
BTS Permission to Dance on Stage - Seoul	Released: July 18, 2025; Label: Big Hit, Hybe; Format: Digital + Photobook	—	—	—N/a	—N/a

=== Other video albums ===
Title	Album details	Peak chart positions		Sales	Certifications
Title	Album details	JPN		Sales	Certifications
Title	Album details	DVD	BD	Sales	Certifications
2014 BTS [Now]: BTS in Thailand	Released: April 24, 2014; Label: Big Hit; Format: DVD + Photobook	—	—	—N/a	—N/a
BTS 2015 Season's Greetings	Released: December 3, 2014; Label: Big Hit; Format: DVD	—	—	—N/a	—N/a
2015 BTS [Now2]: BTS in Europe & America	Released: February 16, 2015; Label: Big Hit; Format: DVD + Photobook	—	—	—N/a	—N/a
Rookie King Bangtan Boys Channel Bangtan	Released: March 18, 2015 (JPN); Labels: Big Hit, Pony Canyon; Format: DVD	37	—	—N/a	—N/a
BTS Memories of 2014	Released: June 16, 2015; Label: Big Hit; Format: 3-DVD	3	—	JPN: 2,601	—N/a
BTS Summer Package in Kota Kinabalu 2015	Released: July 22, 2015; Label: Big Hit; Format: DVD + Photobook	—	—	—N/a	—N/a
BTS 2016 Season's Greetings	Released: December 9, 2015; Label: Big Hit; Format: DVD	—	—	—N/a	—N/a
BTS Japan Official Fan Meeting Vol.2 –Undercover Mission–	Released: January 13, 2016 (JPN); Label: Big Hit, Pony Canyon; Format: 2 DVDs + Photobook	—	—	—N/a	—N/a
2016 BTS [Now3]: BTS in Chicago – Dreaming Days	Released: April 5, 2016; Label: Big Hit; Format: DVD + Photobook	—	—	45,000	—N/a
BTS Memories of 2015	Released: June 21, 2016; Label: Big Hit; Format: 4 DVDs + Photobook	6	5	JPN: 3,924	—N/a
BTS Summer Package in Dubai 2016	Released: August 12, 2016; Label: Big Hit; Format: DVD + Photobook	—	—	—N/a	—N/a
BTS 2017 Season's Greetings	Released: December 9, 2016; Label: Big Hit; Format: DVD	—	—	—N/a	—N/a
BTS 3rd Muster [Army.Zip+]	Released: March 30, 2017; Label: Big Hit; Format: 3-DVD, Photobook & Storybook	—	—	—N/a	—N/a
BTS Japan Official Fanmeeting Vol.3 ～君に届く～	Released: June 28, 2017 (JPN); Labels: Big Hit, Play; Format: 3-DVD, Photobook	3	—	JPN: 10,021	—N/a
BTS Memories of 2016	Released: July 31, 2017; Label: Big Hit; Format: 4 DVDs + Photobook	1	—	—N/a	—N/a
2017 BTS Summer Package Vol.3	Released: August 22, 2017; Label: Big Hit; Format: 4 DVDs + Photobook	1	—	—N/a	—N/a
"BTS 2018 Season's Greetings"	Released: December 15, 2017; Label: Big Hit; Format: DVD	—	—	—N/a	—N/a
BTS Memories of 2017	Released: June 27, 2018 (KOR) & July 4, 2018 (JPN); Labels: Big Hit, Play, Genie, Universal; Format: 5 DVDs + Photobook	2	—	JPN: 37,797	—N/a
2018 BTS Summer Package Vol. 4	Released: August 14, 2018(KOR) & August 29, 2018(JPN); Labels: Big Hit, Play, Genie, Universal; Format: DVD + Photobook	2	—	JPN: 45,939	—N/a
BTS 4th MUSTER [Happy Ever After]	Released: October 31, 2018; Label: Big Hit; Format: 3 DVDs + Photobook	2	4	JPN: 52,798	—N/a
BTS 2019 Season's Greetings	Released: December 28, 2018; Label: Big Hit; Format: DVD	—	—	—N/a	—N/a
BTS Memories of 2018	Released: August 8, 2019; Label: Big Hit; Format: DVD, Blu-ray (both w/ Photobook)	3	2	JPN: 55,574	—N/a
2019 BTS Summer Package	Released: September 26, 2019; Labels: Big Hit, Play, beNX; Format: DVD + Photobook	1	—	JPN: 61,667	—N/a
BTS 2020 Season's Greetings	Released: December 19, 2019; Label: Big Hit, Play; Format: DVD	1	—	JPN: 49,729	—N/a
BTS 2020 Winter Package	Released: January 29, 2020; Label: Big Hit Three Sixty, Play; Format: DVD + Photobook	1	—	JPN: 61,009	—N/a
BTS 5th MUSTER [Magic Shop]	Released: April 7, 2020 (DVD) / May 5, 2020 (Blu-ray); Label: Big Hit Three Sixty, Play; Format: DVD, Blu-ray (both w/ Photobook)	2	4	JPN: 59,320	—N/a
BTS Memories of 2019	Released: August 12, 2020 (DVD) / September 10, 2020 (Blu-ray); Label: Big Hit Three Sixty, Play; Format: DVD, Blu-ray (both w/ Photobook)	1	2	JPN: 96,850	—N/a
BTS Japan Official Fanmeeting Vol.5 [Magic Shop]	Released: August 26, 2020 (DVD) / September 25, 2020 (Blu-ray); Label: Big Hit Three Sixty, Play; Format: DVD, Blu-ray (both w/ Photobook)	1	1	JPN: 75,792	—N/a
BTS 2021 Season's Greetings	Released: December 15, 2020; Label: Big Hit Three Sixty, Play; Format: DVD + Photobook	1	—	JPN: 95,799	—N/a
BTS 2021 Winter Package	Released: March 5, 2021; Label: Big Hit Three Sixty, Play; Format: DVD + Photobook	2	—	JPN: 123,073	—N/a
BTS Memories of 2020	Released: August 10, 2021 (DVD) / August 20, 2021 (Blu-ray) (JPN); Label: Big Hit Three Sixty, Play; Format: DVD, Blu-ray (both w/ Photobook)	1	1	JPN: 219,926	RIAJ: Gold
BTS 2022 Season's Greetings	Released: December 9, 2021; Label: Big Hit, Hybe, Play; Format: Digital + Photobook	—	—	—N/a	—N/a
2021 BTS Muster Sowoozoo	Released: May 27, 2022 (DVD) / July 22, 2022 (Blu-ray) (JPN); Label: Big Hit, Hybe, Play; Format: DVD, Blu-ray (both w/ Photobook)	2	2	JPN: 276,107	RIAJ: Gold
BTS Memories of 2021	Released: August 19, 2022 (DVD) / September 21, 2022 (Blu-ray); Label: Big Hit, Hybe, Play; Format: DVD, Blu-ray (both w/ Photobook)	1	1	JPN: 150,789	RIAJ: Gold

== Filmography ==
=== Films ===
Title	Year	Role	Ref.
Burn the Stage: The Movie	2018	Themselves	
Love Yourself in Seoul	2019	Themselves	
Bring the Soul: The Movie	2019	Themselves	
Break the Silence: The Movie	2020	Themselves	
BTS: Permission to Dance on Stage – LA	2022	Themselves	
BTS: Yet to Come in Cinemas	2023	Themselves	
BTS: The Return	2026	Themselves	

=== Television ===
Title	Year	Note(s)	Ref.
Rookie King: Channel Bangtan	2013	BTS-based reality show, 8 episodes, aired on SBS MTV	
BTS China Job	2014	BTS-based reality show, 3 episodes, aired on YinYueTai	
American Hustle Life	2014	BTS-based reality show, 8 episodes, aired on Mnet	
BTS GO!	2014	BTS-based reality show, episode 7, aired on Mnet America	
Run BTS!	2018	8 episodes	
Run BTS!	2019		
Run BTS!	2020	8 episodes	
BTS In the Soop	2020	BTS-based reality show, 8 episodes	
The Disney Holiday Singalong	2020	Television special, aired on ABC	
Let's BTS	2021	100-minute BTS-based talk show special hosted by KBS2	
BTS In the Soop 2	2021	BTS-based reality show, 4 episodes	

=== Online shows ===
Title	Year	Platform	Note(s)	Ref.
BTS Bokbulbok	2015	V Live	5 episodes	
BTS GAYO	2015–2017	V Live	15 episodes	
Run BTS!	2015–present	V Live, Weverse	3 seasons	
BTS: Bon Voyage	2016–present	V Live, Weverse	4 seasons of 8 episodes each	
Burn the Stage	2018	YouTube Premium	Documentary on BTS' Wings tour, 8 episodes	
Bring the Soul: Docu-series	2019	Weverse	Documentary on BTS' Love Yourself tour, 6 episodes	
Learn Korean With BTS	2020	Weverse	30 episodes	
Break the Silence: Docu-Series	2020	Weverse	Documentary on BTS' Love Yourself tour and Speak Yourself tour, 7 episodes	
BTS In the Soop	2020	Weverse	BTS-based reality show, 8 episodes	
BTS Smash.City	2021	Smash. app	Japanese app-based video series	
BTS In the Soop 2	2021	Weverse	BTS-based reality show, 5 episodes	
BTS Monuments: Beyond the Star	2023	Disney+	8-part chronological docuseries of BTS' history from debut to present; includes music and video footage spanning their first nine years. Additionally, features the daily lives of the individual band members as they enter the next phase of their careers.	

== Exhibitions ==
Title	Year	Country	Ref.
"Butterfly Dream: BTS Open Media Exhibition"	2015	South Korea	
"BTS Exhibition: 24/7=Serendipity (Five, Always)"	2018	South Korea	
"BTS Exhibition: 24/7=Serendipity (Five, Always)"	2019	China	
"BTS Exhibition: 24/7=Serendipity (Five, Always)"	2019	United States	
"BTS Museum"	2021	South Korea	
"BTS EXHIBITION : Proof"	2022	South Korea	
"BTS EXHIBITION : Proof"	2022	Japan	
"BTS EXHIBITION : Proof"	2023–2024	United States	
"BTS EXHIBITION : Proof"	2023–2024	China	
"BTS EXHIBITION : Proof"	2023–2024	Thailand	
"BTS EXHIBITION : Proof"	2023–2024	Indonesia	
"BTS EXHIBITION : Proof"	2023–2024	Taiwan	
"BTS X James Jean: Seven Phases"	2023–2024	Germany	
"BTS X James Jean: Seven Phases"	2023–2024	Philippines	
"BTS X James Jean: Seven Phases"	2023–2024	Singapore	
