= Break the Silence: The Movie =

2020 documentary film directed by Park Jun-soo

- Theatrical release poster
- Hangul: 브레이크 더 사일런스: 더 무비
- RR: Beureikeu deo sailleonseu: deo mubi
- MR: Pŭreik'ŭ tŏ saillŏnsŭ: tŏ mubi
- Directed by: Park Jun-soo
- Starring: RM; Jin; Suga; J-Hope; Jimin; V; Jungkook
- Music by: BTS
- Production company: Big Hit Three Sixty
- Distributed by: Trafalgar Releasing
- Release date: September 10, 2020
- Running time: 90 minutes
- Country: South Korea
- Languages: Korean; English; Portuguese; Dutch
- Box office: $9 million

Break the Silence: The Movie (Korean: 브레이크 더 사일런스: 더 무비) is a 2020 South Korean concert documentary film directed by Park Jun-soo and produced by Big Hit Three Sixty, featuring the behind-the-scenes of boy band BTS' 2018–2019 Love Yourself World Tour. Promoted as the sequel to the band's 2019 film Bring the Soul: The Movie, it was released on September 10, 2020, in select countries, with distribution handled by Trafalgar Releasing. The film is an adaptation of the band's third documentary series, Break the Silence: Docu-Series, released on the fan platform Weverse in May.

== Synopsis ==
Break the Silence: The Movie follows the band on and off stage for 14 months during their Love Yourself World Tour and it further showcases their vulnerable emotional side, illustrating how they separate themselves from their stage personas. It also features stock footage of the band.

== Background and release ==
The film was first announced on August 7, 2020. It was also announced that BTS' third film Bring the Soul: The Movie (2019) would be re-released in theaters on August 28–30 and that a preview of Break the Silence would be screened.

Tickets went on sale on August 13, 2020, the day the film's trailer was released. The film was released on September 10 in 70 countries, with a staggered rollout in over 40 other territories beginning September 24. In select countries, the music video for "Dynamite" was played before the film began.

== Reception ==
The film earned $8,954,345 at the global box office.
