= List of 2019 box office number-one films in Taipei =

This is a list of films which have reached number one at the weekend box office in Taipei, Taiwan during 2019.

== Films ==
†	This implies the highest-grossing movie of the year.

Week	Weekend end date	Film	Weekend gross (in 10,000 New Taiwan Dollar)	Cumulative box office (in 10,000 New Taiwan Dollar)	Openings in the Top 10
1	January 6, 2019	Aquaman	$631	$13,254	A Private War (#8)
2	January 13, 2019	Aquaman	$401	$13,928	The Mule (#3); A Dog's Way Home (#4); Replicas (#5); Swing Kids (#10)
3	January 20, 2019	Glass	$1,009	$1,449	The Kid Who Would Be King (#7); Shimajirou the Movie: Great Adventure on Magic Island (#10)
4	January 27, 2019	Glass	$485	$2,420	Serenity (#2); Love Yourself in Seoul (#3); Handan (#4); Green Book (#5)
5	February 3, 2019	How to Train Your Dragon: The Hidden World	$884	$1,326	Mary Poppins Returns (#5); Big Three Dragons (#7); Holmes & Watson (#10)
6	February 10, 2019	Alita: Battle Angel	$1,797	$3,592	Integrity (#6); The Knight of Shadows: Between Yin and Yang (#10)
7	February 17, 2019	Alita: Battle Angel	$1,068	$5,741	Happy Death Day 2U (#3); Fall in Love at First Kiss (#5); The Lego Movie 2: The Second Part (#6); The Wife (#7)
8	February 24, 2019	Alita: Battle Angel	$623	$6,835	Extreme Job (#2); Dragon Ball Super: Broly (#3); The Hole in the Ground (#8); Is It Wrong to Try to Pick Up Girls in a Dungeon?: Arrow of the Orion (#9); At Eternity's Gate (#10)
9	March 3, 2019	Extreme Job	$693	$1,565	Cold Pursuit (#3); Escape Room (#5); Innocent Witness (#7); Vice (#9)
10	March 10, 2019	Captain Marvel	$4,162	$5,876	Red Dust (#8)
11	March 17, 2019	Captain Marvel	$2,078	$9,438	Fate/stay night: Heaven's Feel II. lost butterfly (#3); Masquerade Hotel (#4); The Upside (#5); The Prodigy (#6)
12	March 24, 2019	Captain Marvel	$867	$10,970	Us (#2); Kursk (#4); Mard Ko Dard Nahi Hota (#8)
13	March 31, 2019	Dumbo	$732	$735	Shazam! (#4); Hotel Mumbai (#5); Five Feet Apart (#6); Reside (#9)
14	April 7, 2019	Shazam!	$1,359	$2,752	Fighting with My Family (#7); Wonder Park (#8); Greta (#9)
15	April 14, 2019	Shazam!	$491	$3,674	Hellboy (#2); Pet Sematary (#3); The Queen's Corgi (#4); 12 Suicidal Teens (#9)
16	April 21, 2019	The Curse of La Llorona	$353	$479	The Professor and the Madman (#10)
17	April 28, 2019	Avengers: Endgame †	$7,416	$11,477	
18	May 5, 2019	Avengers: Endgame †	$3,852	$20,309	Missing Link (#2); The Shooting of 319 (#4); Fortuna's Eye (#5); Berlin, I Love You (#8)
19	May 12, 2019	Detective Pikachu	$1,705	$2,030	The Hustle (#3); P Storm (#4); Yuli (#8)
20	May 19, 2019	John Wick: Chapter 3 – Parabellum	$1,410	$1,985	Bad Boy Symphony (#5); A Dog's Journey (#6); Free Solo (#7); UglyDolls (#9); Always Miss You (#10)
21	May 26, 2019	Aladdin	$1,583	$1,968	Mayday Life 3D (#3); Nicky Larson et le Parfum de Cupidon (#8); Long Shot (#9); My Special Brother (#10)
22	June 2, 2019	Godzilla: King of the Monsters	$2,623	$3,690	Ma (#4); Code Geass: Lelouch of the Re;surrection (#9); Run for Dream (#10)
23	June 9, 2019	Dark Phoenix	$1,638	$2,175	The Secret Life of Pets 2 (#4)
24	June 16, 2019	Men in Black: International	$1,184	$1,697	Chasing the Dragon II: Wild Wild Bunch (#6); Rocketman (#7); The Purity of Vengeance (#9); 0.0MHz (#10)
25	June 23, 2019	Toy Story 4	$2,359	$2,764	Anna (#4); The Gangster, The Cop, The Devil (#5); Child's Play (#6)
26	June 30, 2019	Toy Story 4	$1,912	$5,947	Annabelle Comes Home (#2); Parasite (#3); Yesterday (#6); Walking Dharma (#10)
27	July 7, 2019	Spider-Man: Far From Home	$3,635	$5,574	
28	July 14, 2019	Spider-Man: Far From Home	$1,867	$9,036	Detective Conan: The Fist of Blue Sapphire (#2); Crawl (#6); Midsommar (#9)
29	July 21, 2019	The Lion King	$2,551	$3,502	The Current War (#5); Nina Wu (#9)
30	July 28, 2019	The Lion King	$1,409	$6,080	Once Upon a Time in Hollywood (#2); Doraemon: Nobita's Chronicle of the Moon Exploration (#8); The Professor (#9)
31	August 4, 2019	Hobbs & Shaw	$3,249	$4,689	
32	August 11, 2019	Hobbs & Shaw	$1,979	$8,206	Scary Stories to Tell in the Dark (#2); Bring the Soul: The Movie (#6); Dora and the Lost City of Gold (#7); Crayon Shin-chan: Honeymoon Hurricane ~The Lost Hiroshi~ (#10)
33	August 18, 2019	Hobbs & Shaw	$892	$9,852	The Divine Fury (#3); Deep Evil (#5); Promare (#10)
34	August 25, 2019	Angel Has Fallen	$1,339	$1,789	One Piece: Stampede (#3); We Are Champions (#4); Sadako (#10)
35	September 1, 2019	Angel Has Fallen	$698	$3,095	The 9th Precinct (#2); Exit (#3); Line Walker 2: Invisible Spy (#8); The Operative (#9)
36	September 8, 2019	It Chapter Two	$1,358	$1,701	Ossan's Love: Love or Dead (#5); Abigail (#9)
37	September 15, 2019	Weathering with You	$1,312	$1,642	Good Boys (#5); Hustlers (#8)
38	September 22, 2019	Detention	$2,164	$2,197	Ad Astra (#3); Downton Abbey (#8)
39	September 29, 2019	Detention	$1,836	$5,335	Rascal Does Not Dream of a Dreaming Girl (#4); The Informer (#5); The Confidence Man JP (#9); Where'd You Go, Bernadette (#10)
40	October 6, 2019	Joker	$2,805	$3,409	Abominable (#4); Danger Close: The Battle of Long Tan (#5)
41	October 13, 2019	Joker	$2,260	$8,059	Rambo: Last Blood (#3); Ready or Not (#4); Zombieland: Double Tap (#6); The Gangs, the Oscars, and the Walking Dead (#7); Children of the Sea (#9); The Bad Guys: Reign of Chaos (#10)
42	October 20, 2019	Maleficent: Mistress of Evil	$1,338	$1,606	
43	October 27, 2019	Gemini Man	$1,308	$1,767	Stand by Me (#4); The Goldfinch (#5)
44	November 3, 2019	Gemini Man	$778	$3,129	The Addams Family (#4); A Sun (#5); Violet Evergarden: Eternity and the Auto Memory Doll (#7); 47 Meters Down: Uncaged (#8)
45	November 10, 2019	Terminator: Dark Fate	$943	$1,179	Midway (#2); Doctor Sleep (#3)
46	November 17, 2019	Midway	$497	$1,383	Chhichhore (#4); KonoSuba: God's Blessing on this Wonderful World! Legend of Crimson (#5); Jexi (#7); Hello World (#10)
47	November 24, 2019	Frozen 2	$2,637	$2,983	Kim Ji-young: Born 1982 (#3)
48	December 1, 2019	Frozen 2	$1,973	$5,878	Ford v Ferrari (#2); Knives Out (#3); 21 Bridges (#7); Motherless Brooklyn (#8); The Garden of Evening Mists (#9)
49	December 8, 2019	Jumanji: The Next Level	$1,489	$1,921	Last Christmas (#5); Special Actors (#8); No Longer Human (#10)
50	December 15, 2019	Jumanji: The Next Level	$908	$3,355	The Good Liar (#5); The Aeronauts (#10)
51	December 22, 2019	Ip Man 4: The Finale	$1,300	$1,380	Star Wars: The Rise of Skywalker (#2)
52	December 29, 2019	Ip Man 4: The Finale	$771	$2,933	Ashfall (#2); Charlie's Angels (#4); Cats (#7); Jojo Rabbit (#8); Countdown (#9)

== See also ==
- List of highest-grossing films in Taiwan
