= Concert film =

Audiovisual recording of a concert performance

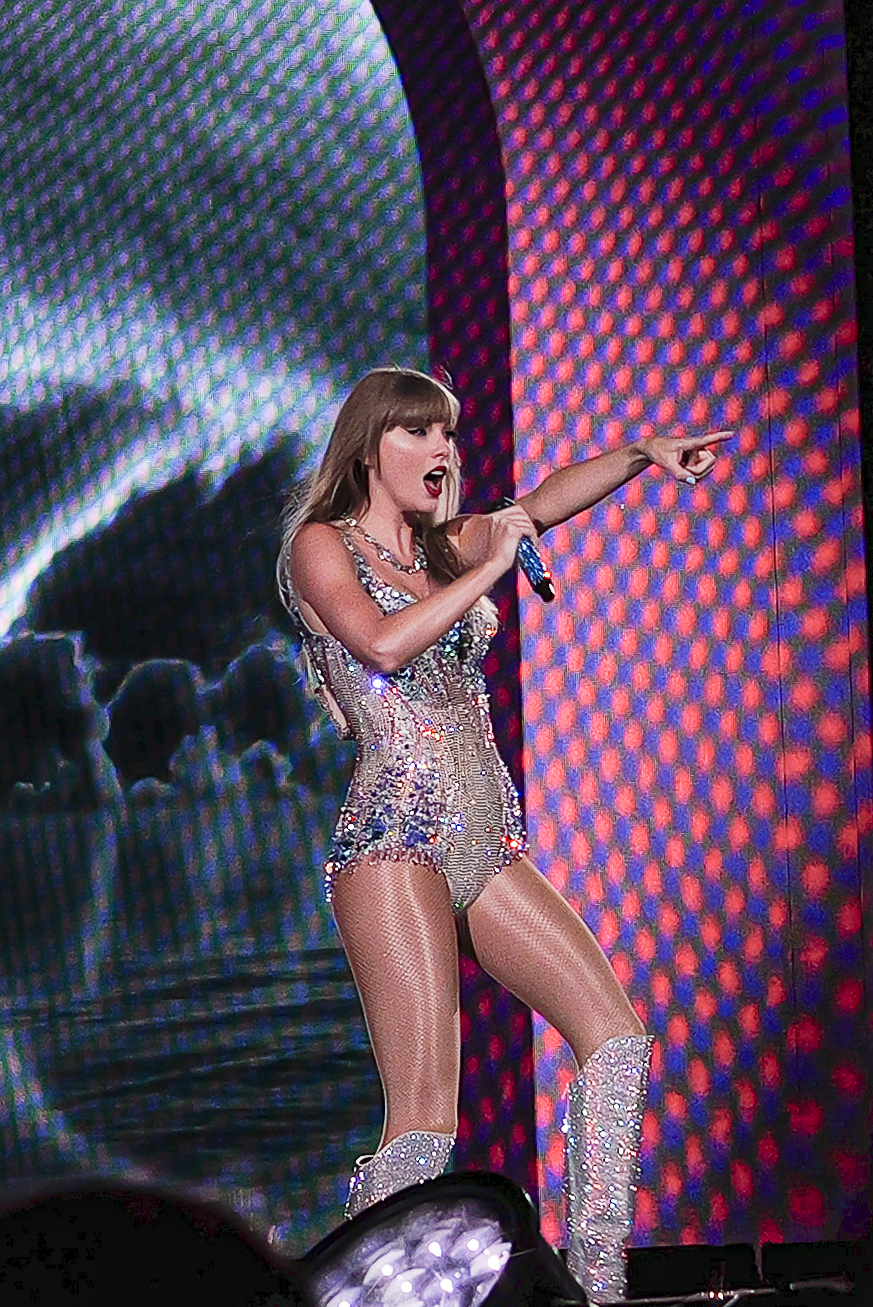
Taylor Swift: The Eras Tour (2023) is the highest-grossing concert film of all time.

A concert film or concert movie is a film that showcases a live performance from the perspective of a concert goer, the subject of which is an extended live music performance or musicals.

== Early history ==
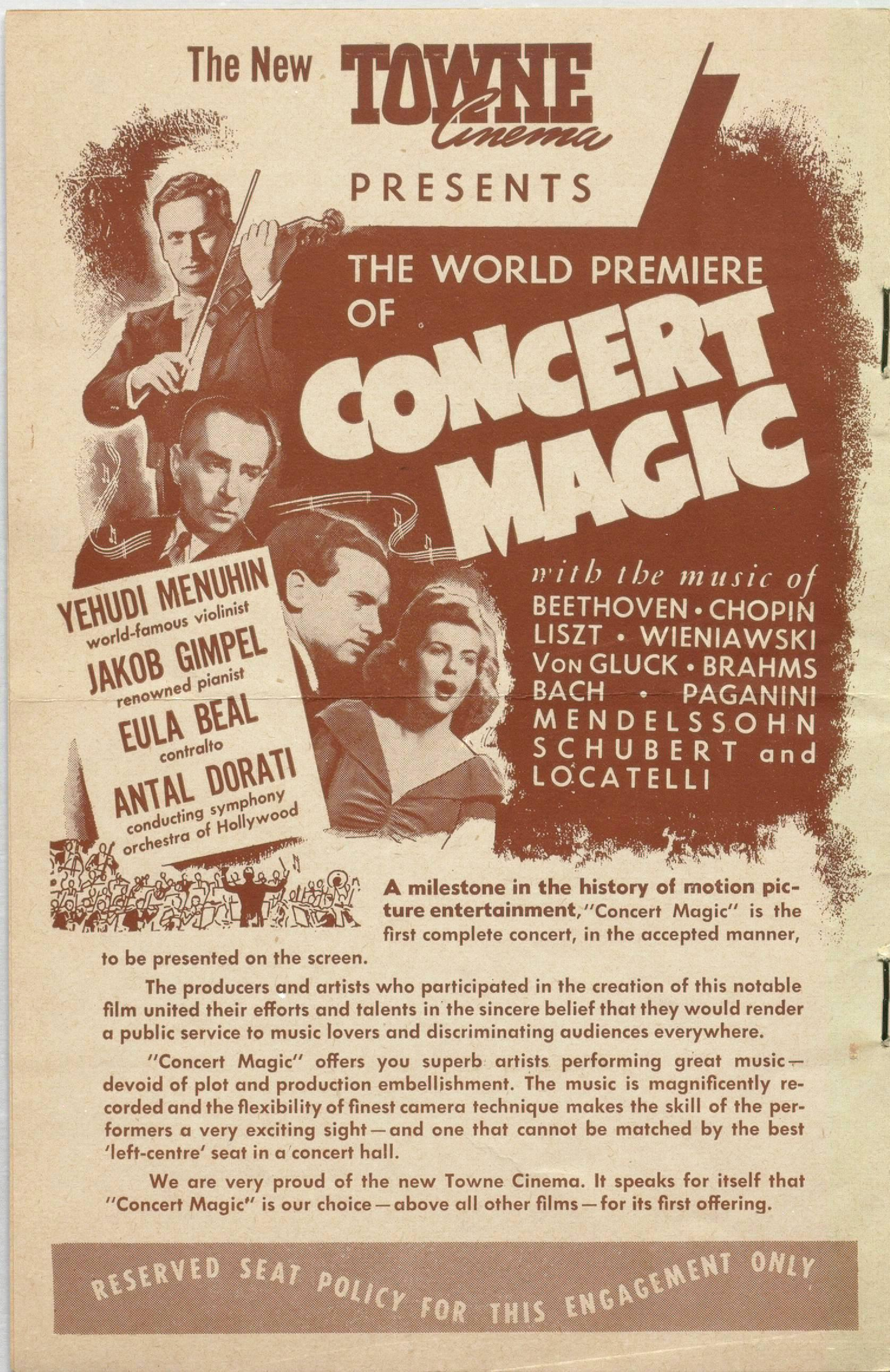
Poster for Concert Magic in 1948 at the Towne Cinema in Toronto, Ontario

One of the earliest-known concert films is the 1944 film Adventure in Music. Another early film is the 1948 picture Concert Magic. This concert features virtuoso violinist Yehudi Menuhin (1916–1999) at the Charlie Chaplin Studios in 1947. Together with various artists, he performed classical and romantic works of famous composers such as Beethoven, Wieniawski, Bach, Paganini, and others.

The earliest known jazz concert film is the 1959 film Jazz on a Summer's Day. The film was recorded during the fifth annual Newport Jazz Festival. The earliest known rock concert film is Rock’n’Roll, a 1959 feature film produced by the promoter Lee Gordon. As it also features some Jazz performances and was released prior to Jazz on a Summer's Day, it arguably has claims to being the first Jazz concert film as well.

A latter notable concert film, the T.A.M.I. Show, featured acts such as The Beach Boys, James Brown, Marvin Gaye, and the Rolling Stones.

One of popular music's most ground-breaking concert films is Pink Floyd: Live at Pompeii (1972), directed by Adrian Maben, in which Pink Floyd perform a short set of songs inside the amphitheatre of Pompeii without an audience (save for the recording crew).

== Examples ==
=== Rockumentary ===
The term "rockumentary" was first used by Bill Drake in the 1969 History of Rock & Roll radio broadcast and is a portmanteau of "rock" and "documentary". The term was subsequently used to describe concert films containing appearances by multiple artists. Then, in 1976, the term was used by the promoters of the live musical production Beatlemania which documented the evolving career of The Beatles. The 1984 mockumentary film This Is Spinal Tap notably parodied the rockumentary genre.

=== Others ===
Other examples of this type of film include Menudo's 1981 film, Menudo: La Película, and Duran Duran's 85-minute 1984 video, Sing Blue Silver. The former mixes a Menudo concert (in Merida, Venezuela) with movie scenes and a plot, while the latter follows Duran Duran as they travel around Canada and the United States doing concerts and actual tourism.

== Highest-grossing concert films ==
Taylor Swift: The Eras Tour, which has grossed $267 million worldwide, is the highest-grossing concert film of all time. The record was previously held by Justin Bieber: Never Say Never (2011).

† Background shading indicates films playing in the week commencing 20 November 2026 in theaters around the world.

Highest-grossing concert films
Rank	Title	Year	Performer	Type	Worldwide gross
1	Taylor Swift: The Eras Tour	2023	Taylor Swift	Music	$267,100,000
2	Justin Bieber: Never Say Never	2011	Justin Bieber	Music	$99,034,125
3	Hannah Montana & Miley Cyrus: Best of Both Worlds Concert	2008	Miley Cyrus	Music	$70,712,099
4	One Direction: This Is Us	2013	One Direction	Music	$68,233,799
5	Eddie Murphy Raw	1987	Eddie Murphy	Stand-up	$50,504,655
6	Renaissance: A Film by Beyoncé	2023	Beyoncé	Music	$44,389,684
7	The Original Kings of Comedy	2000	Steve Harvey · D.L. Hughley · Cedric the Entertainer · Bernie Mac	Stand-up	$38,236,338
8	Richard Pryor: Live on the Sunset Strip	1982	Richard Pryor	Stand-up	$34,970,309
9	Woodstock	1970	Various	Music	$34,699,266
10	Katy Perry: Part of Me	2012	Katy Perry	Music	$32,700,439
12	Kevin Hart: Let Me Explain	2013	Kevin Hart	Stand-up	$32,327,255
13	Metallica Through the Never	2013	Metallica	Music	$31,900,000
14	Jonas Brothers: The 3D Concert Experience	2009	Jonas Brothers	Music	$30,428,831
15	BTS: Yet to Come in Cinemas	2023	BTS	Music	$29,291,883
16	Madonna: Truth or Dare	1991	Madonna	Music	$29,012,935
17	Billie Eilish – Hit Me Hard and Soft: The Tour (Live in 3D)	2026	Billie Eilish	Music	$26.7 million
18	U2 3D	2008	U2	Music	$26,170,402
19	Kevin Hart: What Now?	2016	Kevin Hart	Stand-up	$23,591,043
20	Martin Lawrence Live: Runteldat	2002	Martin Lawrence	Stand-up	$19,184,820
21	Glee: The 3D Concert Movie	2011	Glee	Music	$17,462,398
22	Richard Pryor: Here and Now	1983	Richard Pryor	Stand-up	$16,156,776
23	Christmas with the Chosen: The Messengers	2021	The Chosen	Religion	$13,388,000
24	You So Crazy	1994	Martin Lawrence	Stand-up	$10,184,701
25	Burn the Stage: The Movie	2018	BTS	Music	$9,881,954
26	U2: Rattle and Hum	1988	U2	Music	$8,600,823
27	Live Broadcast from Buenos Aires	2022	Coldplay	Music	$8,400,000
28	Kevin Hart: Laugh at My Pain	2011	Kevin Hart	Stand-up	$7,712,436
29	Mayday Life	2019	Mayday	Music	$7,272,220
30	The Phantom of the Opera at the Royal Albert Hall	2012	The Phantom of the Opera	Stage production	$7,106,631
31	Prima Facie	2022	Prima Facie	Stage production	$6,646,622
32	BTS World Tour: Love Yourself in Seoul	2019	BTS	Music	$6,587,004
33	Stop Making Sense	1984	Talking Heads	Music	$5,694,759
34	Hamlet	2015	Hamlet	Stage production	$5,350,452
35	Divine Madness	1980	Bette Midler	Music	$5,318,098
36	Les Misérables: The Staged Concert	2019	Les Misérables	Stage production	$5,042,935
37	IM Hero: The Final	2023	Lim Young-woong	Music	$4,514,656
38	National Theatre Live: The Audience	2013	The Audience	Stage production	$4,330,068
39	Romeo and Juliet (Secret Cinema 2018)	2018	Romeo and Juliet	Stage production	$4,282,983
40	André Rieu 2018 Maastricht Concert	2018	André Rieu	Music	$3,869,719
41	André Rieu: 70 Years Young	2020	André Rieu	Music	$3,788,405
42	Miss Saigon 25th Anniversary Performance	2016	Miss Saigon	Stage production	$3,720,532
43	Coldplay: A Head Full of Dreams	2018	Coldplay	Music	$3,500,000
44	André Rieu 2019 Maastricht Concert	2019	André Rieu	Music	$3,495,372
45	National Theatre Live: Frankenstein	2011	Frankenstein	Stage production	$3,351,486
46	Let's Spend the Night Together	1983	The Rolling Stones	Music	$3,282,561
47	Floyd Mayweather Jr. vs. Conor McGregor	2017	Floyd Mayweather Jr. · Conor McGregor	Sports	$3,250,019
48	André Rieu's 2016 Maastricht Concert	2016	André Rieu	Music	$3,220,727
49	The Winter's Tale	2015	The Winter's Tale	Stage production	$3,097,621
50	André Rieu's 2017 Maastricht Concert	2017	André Rieu	Music	$3,097,621

=== Music ===
The top 15 are among the highest-grossing concert films. André Rieu is the most frequent performance with 13 titles on the list.

† Background shading indicates films playing in the week commencing 20 November 2026 in theaters around the world.

Highest-grossing music concert films
Rank	Title	Year	Performer	Worldwide gross
1	Taylor Swift: The Eras Tour	2023	Taylor Swift	$267,100,000
2	Justin Bieber: Never Say Never	2011	Justin Bieber	$99,034,125
3	Hannah Montana & Miley Cyrus: Best of Both Worlds Concert	2008	Miley Cyrus	$70,712,099
4	One Direction: This Is Us	2013	One Direction	$68,233,799
5	Renaissance: A Film by Beyoncé	2023	Beyoncé	$44,043,065
6	Woodstock	1970	Various	$34,699,266
7	Katy Perry: Part of Me	2012	Katy Perry	$32,700,439
8	Permission to Dance on Stage – Seoul: Live Viewing	2022	BTS	$32,600,000
9	Metallica Through the Never	2013	Metallica	$31,900,000
10	Jonas Brothers: The 3D Concert Experience	2009	Jonas Brothers	$30,428,831
11	BTS: Yet to Come in Cinemas	2023	BTS	$29,291,883
12	Madonna: Truth or Dare	1991	Madonna	$29,012,935
13	U2 3D	2008	U2	$26,170,402
14	Billie Eilish – Hit Me Hard and Soft: The Tour (Live in 3D)	2026	Billie Eilish	$25,195,000
15	Burn the Stage: The Movie	2018	BTS	$20,347,513
16	U2: Rattle and Hum	1988	U2	$8,600,823
17	Live Broadcast from Buenos Aires	2022	Coldplay	$8,400,000
18	Mayday Life	2019	Mayday	$7,272,220
19	BTS World Tour: Love Yourself in Seoul	2019	BTS	$6,587,004
20	Stop Making Sense	1984	Talking Heads	$5,694,759
21	Divine Madness	1980	Bette Midler	$5,318,098
22	George Michael: The Faith Tour	2026	George Michael	$5,000,000
23	IM Hero: The Final	2023	Lim Young-woong	$4,514,656
24	Queen Rock Montreal	1981	Queen	$4,100,000
25	André Rieu 2018 Maastricht Concert	2018	André Rieu	$3,869,719
26	André Rieu: 70 Years Young	2020	André Rieu	$3,788,405
27	Coldplay: A Head Full of Dreams	2018	Coldplay	$3,500,000
28	André Rieu 2019 Maastricht Concert	2019	André Rieu	$3,495,372
29	Let's Spend the Night Together	1983	The Rolling Stones	$3,282,561
30	André Rieu's 2016 Maastricht Concert	2016	André Rieu	$3,220,727
31	André Rieu's 2017 Maastricht Concert	2017	André Rieu	$3,097,621
32	The Met: Live in HD – Aida	2013	Aida	$2,943,797
33	The Beatles Get Back: The Rooftop Concert	2022	The Beatles	$2,881,726
34	André Rieu's 2015 Maastricht Concert	2015	André Rieu	$2,862,599
35	André Rieu: Christmas with Andre 2016	2016	André Rieu	$2,809,890
36	André Rieu's Sydney Town Hall Concert – An Australian Celebration	2018	André Rieu	$2,806,603
37	Greatest Hits Live	2019	Take That	$2,549,176
38	Depeche Mode: Spirits in the Forest	2019	Depeche Mode	$2,442,030
39	André Rieu's 2014 Maastricht Concert	2014	André Rieu	$2,190,155
40	Metallica & San Francisco Symphony S&M2	2019	Metallica · San Francisco Symphony	$2,179,640
41	Billie Eilish Live at the O2	2023	Billie Eilish	$2,117,195
42	André Rieu 2023 Maastricht Concert: Love is All Around	2023	André Rieu	$1,897,239
43	André Rieu Live in Dublin	2023	André Rieu	$1,826,384
44	N'SYNC: Bigger Than Live	2001	NSYNC	$1,808,679
45	Cliff Richard Live: 60th Anniversary Tour	2018	Cliff Richard	$1,686,021
46	Rammstein: Paris	2017	Rammstein	$1,658,090
47	Twenty One Pilots: Cinema Experience	2022	Twenty One Pilots	$1,560,000
48	André Rieu: Christmas with André 2021	2021	André Rieu	$1,559,304
49	Take That Live 2015	2015	Take That	$1,553,608
50	Take That: Wonderland Live from the O2	2017	Take That	$1,422,889
51	Big Bang Made	2016	BigBang	$1,404,745

=== Stage production ===
† Background shading indicates films playing in the week commencing 20 November 2026 in theaters around the world.

Highest-grossing stage production concert films
Rank	Title	Year	Performance	Worldwide gross
1	The Phantom of the Opera at the Royal Albert Hall	2012	The Phantom of the Opera	$7,106,631
2	Prima Facie	2022	Prima Facie	$6,646,622
3	Hamlet	2015	Hamlet	$5,350,452
4	Les Misérables: The Staged Concert	2019	Les Misérables	$5,042,935
5	National Theatre Live: The Audience	2013	The Audience	$4,330,068
6	Romeo and Juliet (Secret Cinema 2018)	2018	Romeo and Juliet	$4,282,983
7	Miss Saigon 25th Anniversary Performance	2016	Miss Saigon	$3,720,532
8	National Theatre Live: Frankenstein	2011	Frankenstein	$3,351,486
9	The Winter's Tale	2015	The Winter's Tale	$3,097,621
10	Billy Elliot the Musical Live	2014	Billy Elliot the Musical	$2,815,788
11	The London Palladium: The King and I	2018	The King and I	$2,692,907
12	George Balanchine's The Nutcracker	2011	The Nutcracker	$2,119,994
13	National Theatre Live: Present Laughter	2019	Present Laughter	$2,033,526
14	A Little Life	2023	A Little Life	$2,033,043
15	Kinky Boots – The Musical	2020	Kinky Boots – The Musical	$1,997,631
16	National Theatre Live: A View From the Bridge	2015	A View From the Bridge	$1,943,723
17	Met Opera: Porgy and Bess	2020	Porgy and Bess	$1,913,398
18	National Theatre Live: Follies	2017	Follies	$1,842,192
19	Met Opera: La Boheme	2018	La Boheme	$1,774,848
20	National Theatre Live: One Man Two Guvnors	2011	One Man Two Guvnors	$1,714,891
21	National Theatre Live: All About Eve	2019	All About Eve	$1,710,659
22	Met Opera: Madama Butterfly	2019	Madama Butterfly	$1,696,923
23	National Theatre Live: Good	2023	Good	$1,674,053
24	National Theatre Live: Of Mice and Men	2014	Of Mice and Men	$1,664,500
25	Royal Opera House: The Nutcracker	2017	The Nutcracker	$1,635,459
26	National Theatre Live: The Lehman Trilogy	2019	The Lehman Trilogy	$1,531,395
27	Royal Opera House: The Nutcracker	2018	The Nutcracker	$1,512,712
28	Met Opera: Turandot (2018) Encore (2018)	2018	Turandot · Encore	$1,500,000
29	Met Opera: Der Rosenkavalier	2017	Der Rosenkavalier	$1,498,974
30	The Nutcracker Royal Ballet	2015	The Nutcracker	$1,494,137
31	All My Sons	2019	All My Sons	$1,454,828
32	Met Opera – Agrippina	2020	Agrippina	$1,453,796
33	No Man's Land – NT Live 2016	2016	No Man's Land	$1,380,144
34	Allelujah!	2018	Allelujah!	$1,347,137
35	De Club van Sinterklaas & Het Grote Pietenfees	2020	De Club van Sinterklaas	$1,336,192
36	National Theatre Live: Hansard	2019	Hansard	$1,318,622
37	National Theater Live 2017: Rosencrantz and Guildenstern Are Dead	2017	Rosencrantz and Guildenstern Are Dead	$1,245,590
38	NT Live: Yerma	2017	Yerma	$1,238,299
39	Branagh Theatre Live: Romeo & Juliet 2016	2016	Romeo and Juliet	$1,223,663
40	National Theatre Live: Twelfth Night	2017	Twelfth Night	$1,210,769
41	National Theater Live: Cyrano de Bergerac	2020	Cyrano de Bergerac	$1,195,764
42	The Nutcracker – Royal Opera, London	2016	The Nutcracker	$1,188,225
43	National Theatre Live: Small Island	2019	Small Island	$1,180,476
44	National Theater Live Amadeus	2017	Live Amadeus	$1,151,772
45	NT Live: Les Liaisons Dangereuses	2016	Les Liaisons Dangereuses	$1,135,686
46	Royal Opera House Swan Lake	2018	Swan Lake	$1,131,961
47	Royal Opera House The Sleeping Beauty	2020	Sleeping Beauty	$1,097,859
48	National Theater Live Hedda Gabler	2017	Hedda Gabler	$1,085,982
49	National Theatre Live: Cat on a Hot Tin Roof	2018	Cat on a Hot Tin Roof	$1,071,526
50	Matthew Bourne's Swan Lake	2019	Swan Lake	$1,068,862
