= Love Yourself World Tour =

2018–19 concert tour by BTS

BTS World Tour: Love Yourself
- World tour by BTS
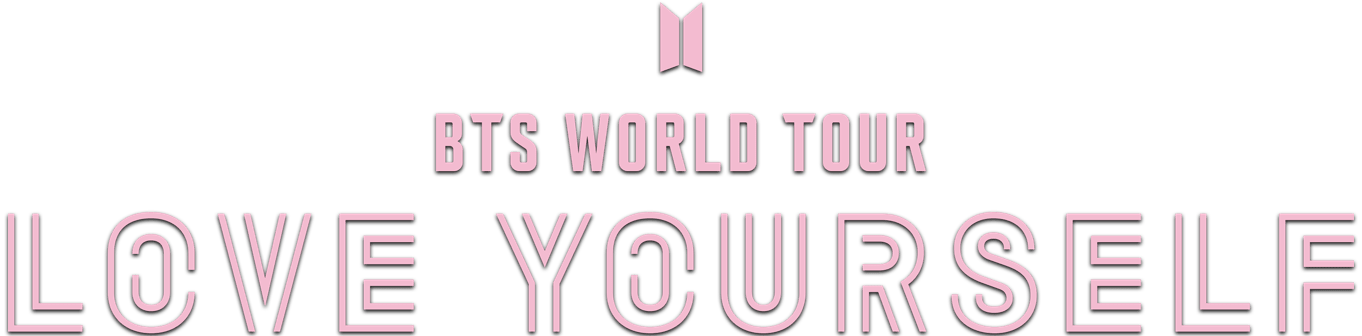
- Location: Asia; Europe; North America
- Associated albums: Love Yourself: Her; Love Yourself: Tear; Love Yourself: Answer; Face Yourself
- Start date: August 25, 2018
- End date: October 29, 2019 (Note: The "Love Yourself" section of the tour ended on April 7, 2019, however a separately named extension, called BTS World Tour Love Yourself: Speak Yourself, was eventually added.)
- Legs: 4
- No. of shows: 42
- Attendance: 1,043,517
- Box office: $130,762,633

BTS concert chronology
- 2017 BTS Live Trilogy Episode III: The Wings Tour (2017); BTS World Tour: Love Yourself (2018–2019); BTS World Tour Love Yourself: Speak Yourself (2019)

BTS World Tour: Love Yourself, commonly known as the Love Yourself World Tour, was the third worldwide concert tour headlined by South Korean band BTS to promote their Love Yourself album series, including their Love Yourself: Her EP, Love Yourself: Tear studio album, and Love Yourself: Answer compilation album. The tour began on August 25, 2018, in South Korea. A stadium extension to the tour, titled BTS World Tour Love Yourself: Speak Yourself, was announced on February 9, 2019, and began in Pasadena, California on May 4, 2019. The tour concluded on October 29, 2019, comprising 62 concerts in 14 countries.

The Love Yourself World Tour ranked at number three on Billboard's 2019 Year End Top 40 Tours chart worldwide, with a worldwide gross of $196.4 million from the last 42 shows of the tour. In total, the tour was attended by over 2 million people, becoming BTS' most successful tour and the highest-grossing concert tour by an act that performs primarily in a non-English language, as reported by Billboard.

== Background ==
On April 26, 2018, Big Hit Entertainment released a trailer on their official YouTube channel announcing an upcoming world tour. The video revealed an initial schedule of 22 shows across 11 cities worldwide. After the announcement, multiple hashtags trended worldwide on social media, including the tour's namesake tag #LOVE_YOURSELF.

== Reception ==
=== Commercial ===
In May 2018, after the first round of North American ticket pre-sales sold out in seconds, a fourth show at Los Angeles' Staples Center was added due to overwhelming fan demand. Tickets for the Hamilton shows sold out in just over an hour, with organizers for the Ontario stop, Core Entertainment, revealing they would have sold out faster if not for the strain put on Ticketmaster's online system due to the unprecedented heavy influx of site traffic. All fourteen North American stops completely sold out, prompting the addition of a fifteenth and final stop of the North American leg at New York's Citi Field. The concert sold out in under ten minutes, making BTS the first Korean artist to headline a stadium show in the United States. The London, Amsterdam, Berlin, and Paris arena stops—the group's first and biggest headlining shows in Europe at the time—also saw commercial success. The London and Berlin shows sold out in two and nine minutes, respectively. After the second general sale for Seoul's Seoul Olympic Stadium dates opened in August, all 90,000 available tickets sold out. Estimated to have sold a total of 790,000 tickets from 33 sold-out shows in 16 cities, BTS added eight additional Asia dates during the European leg of the tour. The first K-pop artists to play at Singapore's National Stadium, BTS sold out all tickets in less than four hours.

According to ticket resale site StubHub, BTS was one of 2018's best selling live artists in international markets outside the United States, second to only Ed Sheeran. Variety named BTS as one of the top touring acts of Fall 2018 in the United States, entering StubHub's "highest-selling act" and "best-selling shows" lists with the "highest-selling average sales per show position". According to Yahoo! Finance, BTS were also the top-selling act and top-selling show in Canada for Fall 2018. In Japan, BTS came in as the nineteenth best-selling touring act on Nikkei Entertainment's 2018 Concert Mobilization Ranking Top 50.

=== Critical ===
The Love Yourself received positive reviews from critics. Media outlets reported that fans began camping outside the Staples Center days ahead the concert. Philip Cosores of Uproxx described BTS' Staples Center four-night concerts as an "enormous, multi-sensory experience" that created an "inclusive" and "multicultural experience" where music surpassed any language barrier. Tiffany Taylor noted for Billboard News the "amazing choreography", praising the solo performances and energy of the fans as highlight of the night. Jim Harrington of The Mercury News referred to the Oracle Arena concert on Oakland as "the hottest concert of the year in the Bay Area", describing the solo performances as "witnessing seven individual stars, each of whom could enjoy a successful solo career." For the Chicago show, critic Kim Youngdae stated that BTS' strengths were the dazzling group displays, artistry in the solo numbers, and how immersive the concert was. On the tour, Crystal Bell of MTV stated, "BTS have created an experience so captivating, so inclusive, and so visually stunning that it's cemented the boy band as one of the most vital acts in pop music today." The Quietus wrote that the European tour was "a search for self-identity": "After two-and-a-half hours of costume changes, pulsing beats, soaring high notes and the impossible iconic beauty of their videos, BTS walk to the front of the stage in low-key jeans and T-shirts. As they sing the last song, ‘Anpanman’, which is about a new kind of superhero, we realise that their awkwardness and sensitivity is also the source of their strength." The Denisonian rated the concert ten out of ten, highlighting the music, visuals, dancing, and fans. Vivid Seats named BTS the 2018 artist of the year, citing the group's history-making concert at Citi Field.

== Set list ==
The three set lists for the tour included the same songs except for the title medley (songs 12 through 16).

1. "Idol"
2. "Save Me"
3. "I'm Fine"
4. "Magic Shop"
5. "Trivia 起: Just Dance"
6. "Euphoria"
7. "I Need U"
8. "Run"
9. "Serendipity"
10. "Trivia 承: Love"
11. "DNA"
12. "21st Century Girl”^{[a]} / "Boyz with Fun"^{[b]}/ "Dope"^{[c]}
13. "Go Go"^{[a]}^{[c]} / "Attack on Bangtan"^{[b]}
14. "Blood Sweat & Tears"^{[a]}^{[c]} / "Fire"^{[b]}
15. "Boy in Luv"^{[a]}^{[c]} / "Silver Spoon"^{[b]}
16. "Danger"^{[a]} / "Dope"^{[b]}/ "Fire"^{[c]}
17. "Airplane Pt. 2"
18. "Singularity"
19. "Fake Love"
20. "Trivia 轉: Seesaw"
21. "Epiphany"
22. "The Truth Untold"
23. "Outro: Tear"
24. "Mic Drop"

Encore

25. "So What"
26. "Anpanman"
27. "Answer: Love Myself"

Notes

- ^{^[a]} indicates setlist one
- ^{^[b]}indicates setlist two
- ^{^[c]}indicates setlist three

== Shows ==
Date	City	Country/region	Venue	Attendance	Revenue
August 25, 2018	Seoul	South Korea	Seoul Olympic Stadium	90,000 / 90,000	$8,411,739
August 26, 2018	Seoul	South Korea	Seoul Olympic Stadium	90,000 / 90,000	$8,411,739
September 5, 2018	Los Angeles	United States	Staples Center	180,000 / 180,000	—N/a
September 6, 2018	Los Angeles	United States	Staples Center	180,000 / 180,000	—N/a
September 8, 2018	Los Angeles	United States	Staples Center	180,000 / 180,000	—N/a
September 9, 2018	Los Angeles	United States	Staples Center	180,000 / 180,000	—N/a
September 12, 2018	Oakland	United States	Oracle Arena	180,000 / 180,000	—N/a
September 15, 2018	Fort Worth	United States	Fort Worth Convention Center	180,000 / 180,000	—N/a
September 16, 2018	Fort Worth	United States	Fort Worth Convention Center	180,000 / 180,000	—N/a
September 20, 2018	Hamilton	Canada	FirstOntario Centre	180,000 / 180,000	—N/a
September 22, 2018	Hamilton	Canada	FirstOntario Centre	180,000 / 180,000	—N/a
September 23, 2018	Hamilton	Canada	FirstOntario Centre	180,000 / 180,000	—N/a
September 28, 2018	Newark	United States	Prudential Center	180,000 / 180,000	—N/a
September 29, 2018	Newark	United States	Prudential Center	180,000 / 180,000	—N/a
October 2, 2018	Chicago	United States	United Center	180,000 / 180,000	—N/a
October 3, 2018	Chicago	United States	United Center	180,000 / 180,000	—N/a
October 6, 2018	New York City	United States	Citi Field	40,000 / 40,000	—N/a
October 9, 2018	London	England	The O_{2} Arena	31,475 / 32,278	$4,943,140
October 10, 2018	London	England	The O_{2} Arena	31,475 / 32,278	$4,943,140
October 13, 2018	Amsterdam	Netherlands	Ziggo Dome	13,893 / 13,893	$2,250,000
October 16, 2018	Berlin	Germany	Mercedes-Benz Arena	25,984 / 25,984	—N/a
October 17, 2018	Berlin	Germany	Mercedes-Benz Arena	25,984 / 25,984	—N/a
October 19, 2018	Paris	France	Accor Arena	28,149 / 28,149	$4,580,000
October 20, 2018	Paris	France	Accor Arena	28,149 / 28,149	$4,580,000
November 13, 2018	Tokyo	Japan	Tokyo Dome	380,000 / 380,000 (Note: The score data is combined from the shows held in Japan from November 13, 14, 21, 23, 24, January 12, 13, February 16, & 17 respectively.)	$44,477,061 (Note: Sales are combined from the shows held in Japan from November 13, 14, 21, 23, 24, January 12, 13, February 16, & 17 respectively.)
November 14, 2018	Tokyo	Japan	Tokyo Dome	380,000 / 380,000	$44,477,061
November 21, 2018	Osaka	Japan	Kyocera Dome Osaka	380,000 / 380,000	$44,477,061
November 23, 2018	Osaka	Japan	Kyocera Dome Osaka	380,000 / 380,000	$44,477,061
November 24, 2018	Osaka	Japan	Kyocera Dome Osaka	380,000 / 380,000	$44,477,061
December 8, 2018	Taoyuan	Taiwan	Taoyuan International Baseball Stadium	250,000 / 250,000 (Note: The score data is combined from the shows held in Asia from December 8, 9, January 19, March 20, 21, 23, 24, April 6, & 7 respectively.)	$7,111,720
December 9, 2018	Taoyuan	Taiwan	Taoyuan International Baseball Stadium	250,000 / 250,000	$7,111,720
January 12, 2019	Nagoya	Japan	Nagoya Dome		
January 13, 2019	Nagoya	Japan	Nagoya Dome		
January 19, 2019	Singapore		Singapore National Stadium		—N/a
February 16, 2019	Fukuoka	Japan	Fukuoka Yahuoku! Dome		
February 17, 2019	Fukuoka	Japan	Fukuoka Yahuoku! Dome		
March 20, 2019	Hong Kong	China	AsiaWorld–Expo		—N/a
March 21, 2019	Hong Kong	China	AsiaWorld–Expo		—N/a
March 23, 2019	Hong Kong	China	AsiaWorld–Expo		—N/a
March 24, 2019	Hong Kong	China	AsiaWorld–Expo		—N/a
April 6, 2019	Bangkok	Thailand	Rajamangala National Stadium		—N/a
April 7, 2019	Bangkok	Thailand	Rajamangala National Stadium		—N/a
Total				1,043,517 / 1,044,320 (99.9%)	$71,773,660

== Speak Yourself extension ==
BTS World Tour Love Yourself: Speak Yourself
- Extended tour by BTS
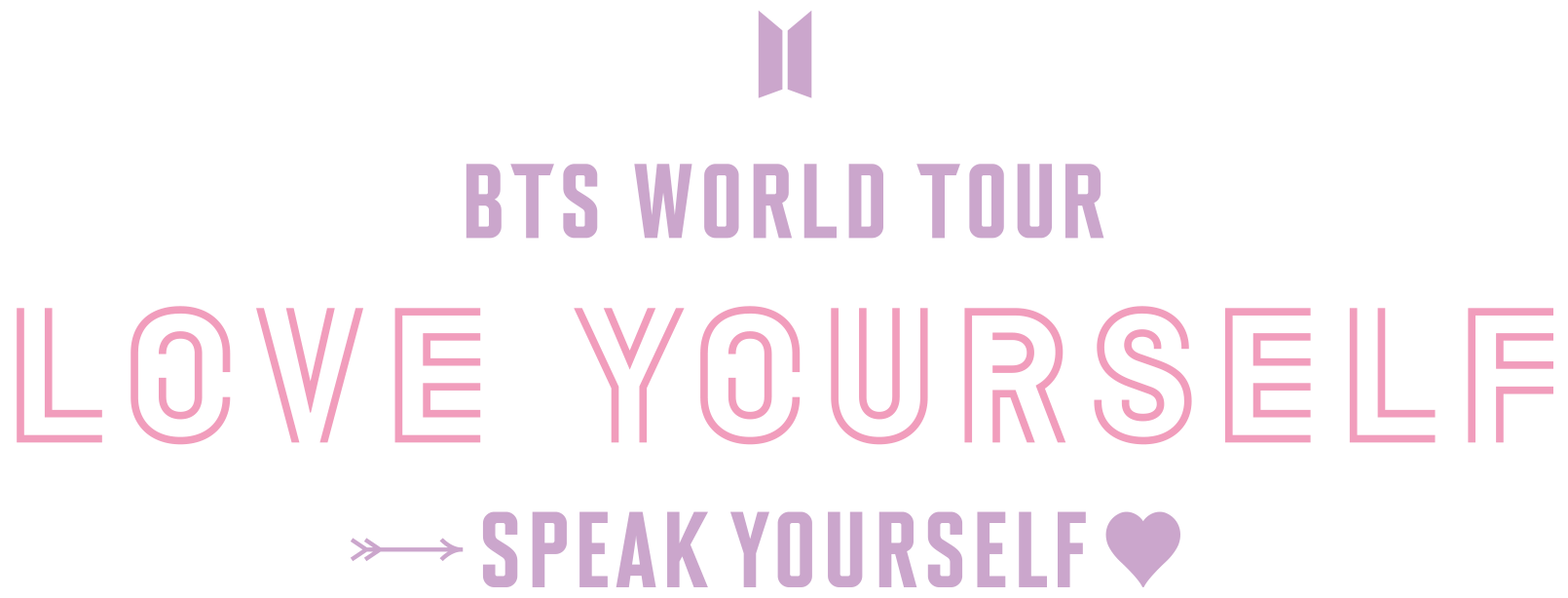
- Location: Asia; Europe; North America; South America
- Associated albums: Love Yourself: Her; Love Yourself: Tear; Love Yourself: Answer; Face Yourself; Map of the Soul: Persona
- Start date: May 4, 2019
- End date: October 29, 2019
- Legs: 4
- No. of shows: 20
- Attendance: 976,283
- Box office: $116 million

BTS concert chronology
- BTS World Tour: Love Yourself (2018–2019); BTS World Tour Love Yourself: Speak Yourself (2019); Map of the Soul ON:E (2020)

=== Background ===
BTS World Tour Love Yourself: Speak Yourself was the stadium extension to the Love Yourself World Tour, promoted under a different name. The extension began on May 4, 2019, in Pasadena, California and featured concerts in North and South America, Europe, and Asia, including the United States, Brazil, England, France, and Japan.

Speak Yourself was first announced on February 19, 2019, through the Big Hit Entertainment YouTube channel, where a spot for the extension was posted. The video featured clips of the BTS members performing, with the title and dates for the tour written on top of them. That same day, Live Nation was revealed as the concert promoter, with tickets sold through Ticketmaster.

=== Commercial reception ===
In North America, tickets sold out for all initial three dates in approximately two and a half hours. The Wembley Stadium stop sold out in 90 minutes and in France tickets sold out in about five and a half hours. Tickets went on sale in Brazil on March 11, 2019. Despite ticket sales website having connecting issues at the time, tickets sold out in 75 minutes. To accommodate demand, additional dates were added to all American, European, and Brazilian dates. The additional European dates sold out the same day they were listed. According to pop music website PopCrush, the extension had higher first-day sales in the United States and Europe than the Rolling Stones' 2019 tour, which went on sale the same day. BTS were also the first Asian act to sell out the Rose Bowl.

According to Billboard Boxscore, the North and South American leg of the tour generated $51.7 million in ticket sales and played to 384,498 fans over eight sold-out shows, becoming the highest-grossing concert tour in month of May 2019. These included a two night stint at Chicago's Soldier Field, playing for 88,156 people, and two nights at East Rutherford's Met Life Stadium, playing for 98,574. Grossing $16.6 million with an attendance of 113,040, Los Angeles' Rose Bowl was the highest grossing show of the leg and the tour overall, ranking as the sixth largest boxscore of the year reported by Billboard. BTS' Rose Bowl stint was also the single highest-grossing engagement in the venue's Boxscore history, out-pacing previous high marks by Taylor Swift and U2, as well as co-headlining stints by Beyoncé & Jay-Z and Eminem & Rihanna. In Europe, the tour continued to be a success with two sold out nights at London's Wembley Stadium, playing for 114,583 people, and two nights at Paris' Stade de France, playing to a crowd of 107,328. Combined, the first 12 shows of the tour extension grossed $78.9 million with 606,409 tickets.

Averaging $5.8 million and 48,814 tickets per show, the tour extension's total gross revenue reached $115,749,851 with total attendance topping out at 976,283 tickets. BTS, with the Love Yourself World Tour, were the top-grossing touring group of 2019 and ranked at number 3 on Billboard's Year End Top 40 Tours. With $196.4 million from 1.6 million tickets at 42 shows in 2019, BTS holds the highest year end ranking in Billboard Boxscore history for an act that performs primarily in a non-English language. Pollstar's Year End Top 100 Tours chart ranked BTS at number 6. On Billboard's Year End Top 25 Boxscores, BTS held seven entries.

Their three-day finale in Seoul in October 2019 was estimated to have an economic value of almost ₩1 trillion ($862 million) and brought in 187,000 foreign visitors to South Korea.

=== Set list ===
BTS featured the following set list for all shows of the Speak Yourself extension.

1. "Dionysus"
2. "Not Today"
3. "Outro: Wings"
4. "Trivia: Just Dance"
5. "Euphoria"
6. "Best of Me"
7. "Serendipity"
8. "Trivia: Love"
9. "Boy With Luv"
10. "Dope"
11. "Silver Spoon"
12. "Fire"
13. "Idol"
14. "Singularity"
15. "Fake Love" (Rocking Vibe Remix)
16. "Trivia: Seesaw"
17. "Epiphany"
18. "The Truth Untold"
19. "Outro: Tear"
20. "Mic Drop"

Encore

21. "Anpanman"
22. "So What"
23. "Make It Right"
24. "Mikrokosmos"

Notes

- During the final shows in Seoul, "Idol" was performed prior to the encore, and "Run" was performed in its original place.

=== Shows ===
Dates	City	Country	Venue	Attendance	Revenue
May 4, 2019	Pasadena	United States	Rose Bowl	113,040 / 113,040	$16,557,515
May 5, 2019	Pasadena	United States	Rose Bowl	113,040 / 113,040	$16,557,515
May 11, 2019	Chicago	United States	Soldier Field	88,156 / 88,156	$13,345,795
May 12, 2019	Chicago	United States	Soldier Field	88,156 / 88,156	$13,345,795
May 18, 2019	East Rutherford	United States	MetLife Stadium	98,574 / 98,574	$14,050,410
May 19, 2019	East Rutherford	United States	MetLife Stadium	98,574 / 98,574	$14,050,410
May 25, 2019	São Paulo	Brazil	Allianz Parque	84,728 / 84,728	$7,712,318
May 26, 2019	São Paulo	Brazil	Allianz Parque	84,728 / 84,728	$7,712,318
June 1, 2019	London	United Kingdom	Wembley Stadium	114,583 / 114,583	$13,545,702
June 2, 2019	London	United Kingdom	Wembley Stadium	114,583 / 114,583	$13,545,702
June 7, 2019	Paris	France	Stade de France	107,328 / 107,328	$13,728,598
June 8, 2019	Paris	France	Stade de France	107,328 / 107,328	$13,728,598
July 6, 2019	Osaka	Japan	Yanmar Stadium Nagai	101,554 / 101,554	$9,832,610
July 7, 2019	Osaka	Japan	Yanmar Stadium Nagai	101,554 / 101,554	$9,832,610
July 13, 2019	Shizuoka	Japan	Shizuoka Stadium	107,153 / 107,153	$10,486,317
July 14, 2019	Shizuoka	Japan	Shizuoka Stadium	107,153 / 107,153	$10,486,317
October 11, 2019	Riyadh	Saudi Arabia	King Fahd International Stadium	31,899 / 37,141	$4,381,560
October 26, 2019	Seoul	South Korea	Seoul Olympic Stadium	129,268 / 129,268	$12,109,026
October 27, 2019	Seoul	South Korea	Seoul Olympic Stadium	129,268 / 129,268	$12,109,026
October 29, 2019	Seoul	South Korea	Seoul Olympic Stadium	129,268 / 129,268	$12,109,026
Total				976,283 / 981,525 (99.47%)	$115,749,851

== Television broadcasts ==
Television premiere date, country of broadcast, title of program, date filmed, and location filmed
Premiere date	Country	Channel	Program title	Recording date	Recording location	Ref.
July 5, 2019	Japan	TBS1	BTS Dome Concert Performance Pre-program: 2018.11 Close-up Documentary	November 2018	Various in South Korea and Japan	
July 15, 2019	Japan	TBS1	BTS World Tour: Love Yourself ~Japan Edition~	November 14, 2018	Tokyo Dome	
July 20, 2019	South Korea	JTBC	BTS World Tour: Love Yourself in Seoul	August 26, 2018	Seoul Olympic Stadium	
August 3, 2019	Japan	TBS1	BTS World Tour: Love Yourself ~Japan Edition~	February 17, 2019	Fukuoka Yahuoku! Dome	
September 7, 2019	Japan	TBS1	BTS World Tour: Love Yourself In New York	October 6, 2018	Citi Field	
October 5, 2019	Japan	TBS1	BTS World Tour: Love Yourself in Seoul (Note: Uncut version)	August 26, 2018	Seoul Olympic Stadium	
November 10, 2019	Japan	TBS1	BTS Stadium Concert Performance Pre-program: 2019.07 Close-up Documentary	July 2019	Various in South Korea and Japan	
December 7, 2019	Japan	TBS1	BTS World Tour "Love Yourself: Speak Yourself"; ~Japan Edition~	July 7, 2019	Yanmar Stadium Nagai	
June 27, 2020	Japan	TBS1	BTS World Tour: Love Yourself in London	October 10, 2018	O2 Arena	
July 25, 2020	Japan	TBS1	BTS World Tour "Love Yourself: Speak Yourself" Sao Paulo	May 26, 2019	Allianz Parque	

== Accolades ==
Love Yourself tour was nominated for three awards during ticket sale website Ticketmaster's year-end awards, winning two of them. The Ticket of the Year Award was awarded to BTS following a user poll by Ticketmaster, using a database of roughly 200 million people to determine the most popular touring act of 2018. In addition, BTS was awarded the French ticket of the year award, which pulled from data via French Ticketmaster sales. The tour was also nominated for the "Most Anticipated Event of the Year, 2019" award, but did not receive it. Love Yourself also won the grand prize award at the 6th Edaily Culture Awards for Best Concert. The Seoul performances were popular among judges because, according to Kim Eun-koo of Edaily, they "created a new history [for] K-pop". The skill of the performers and popularity of the event were also cited as influences on the decision.

At the 47th Annual American Music Awards, Love Yourself World Tour was awarded the "Tour of the Year" award. The tour was also nominated for Ticketmaster's 2019 UK ticket of the year and Global ticket of the year awards, while it won the France ticket of the year, Most Anticipated Event of the Year 2020 in France and in Spain awards.

=== Awards ===
Year	Organization	Award	Result	Ref.
2019	Edaily Culture Awards (Note: The Edaily Culture Awards are a South Korean award ceremony established in 2019 to honor the year's best achievements in six categories: theatre, classical, dance, Korean music, musicals and concerts. Winners are selected by a panel of 54 judges who are professionals in each field.)	Concert Category	Won	
2019	American Music Awards	Tour of the Year	Won	
2018	Ticketmaster Awards	Global Ticket of the Year	Won	
2018	Ticketmaster Awards	French Ticket of the Year	Won	
2019	Ticketmaster Awards	Global Ticket of the year	Nominated	
2019	Ticketmaster Awards	UK Ticket of the Year	Nominated	
2019	Ticketmaster Awards	French Ticket of the Year	Won	
2019	Ticketmaster Awards	Touring Milestone Award	Won	
2019	Teen Choice Awards	Choice Summer Tour	Won	

== Gallery ==
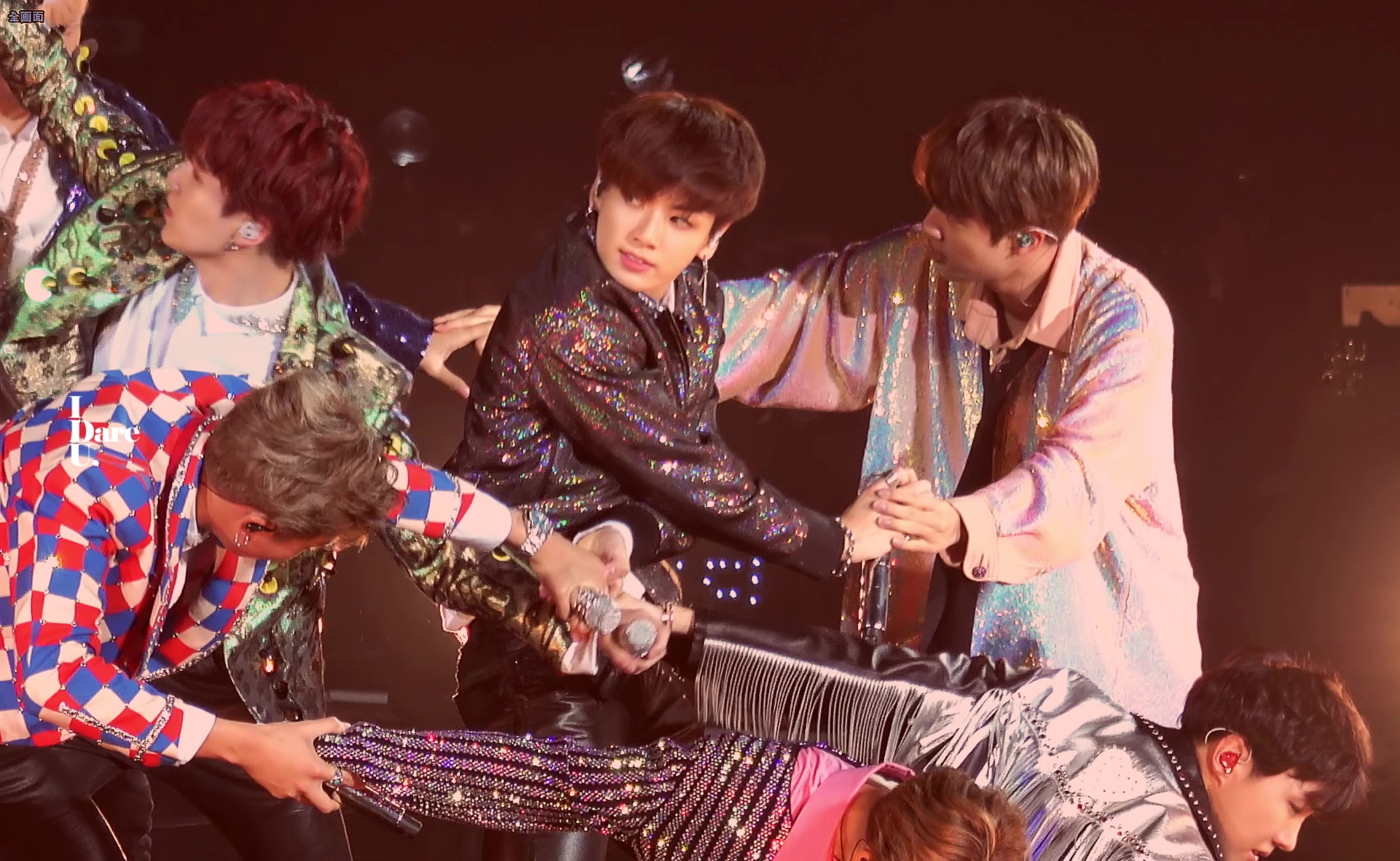
BTS performing "DNA" during Love Yourself tour in Los Angeles on September 8, 2018.

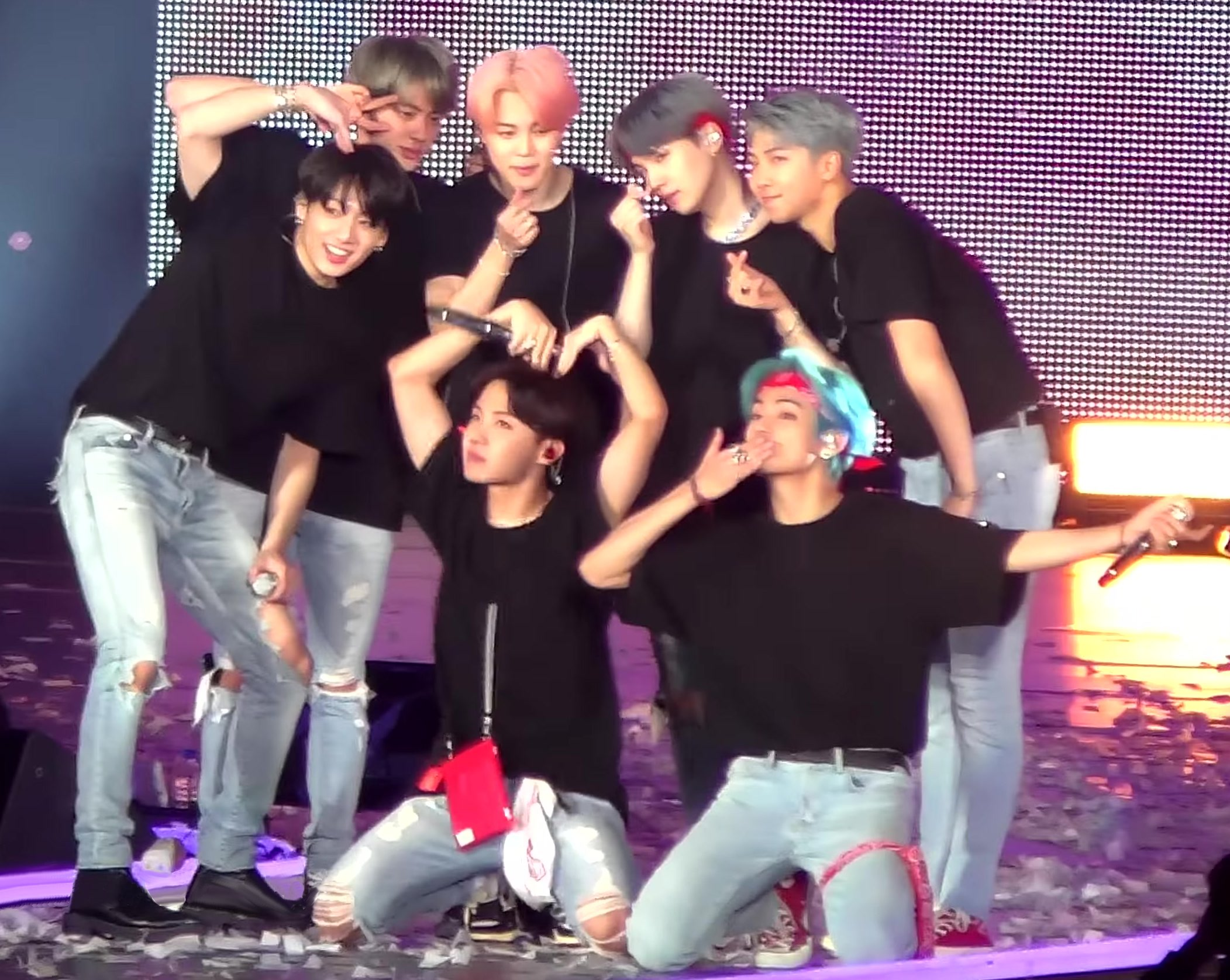
BTS at Love Yourself concert in Nagoya on January 13, 2019.

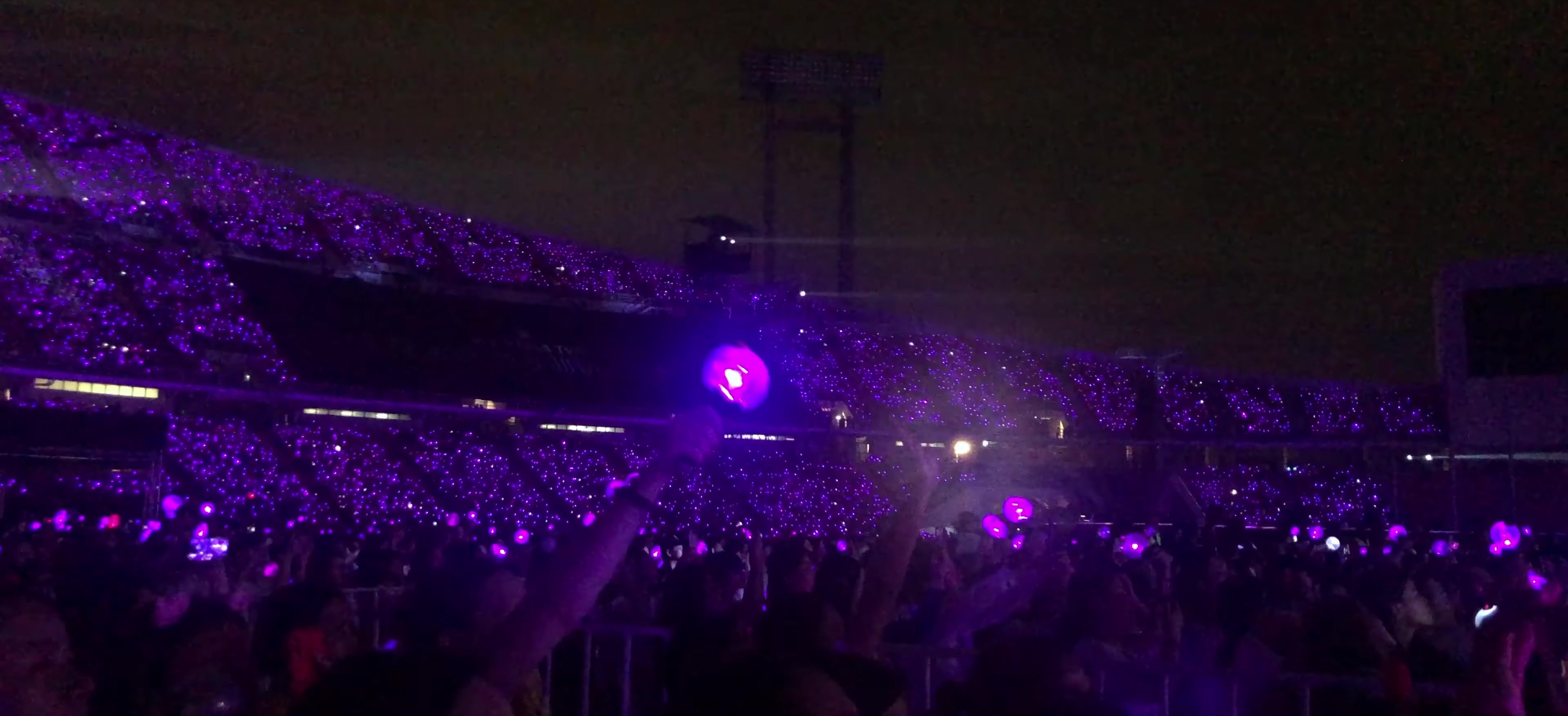
ARMY 'Purple Ocean' during BTS Love Yourself tour in Bangkok, Thailand on April 7, 2019.

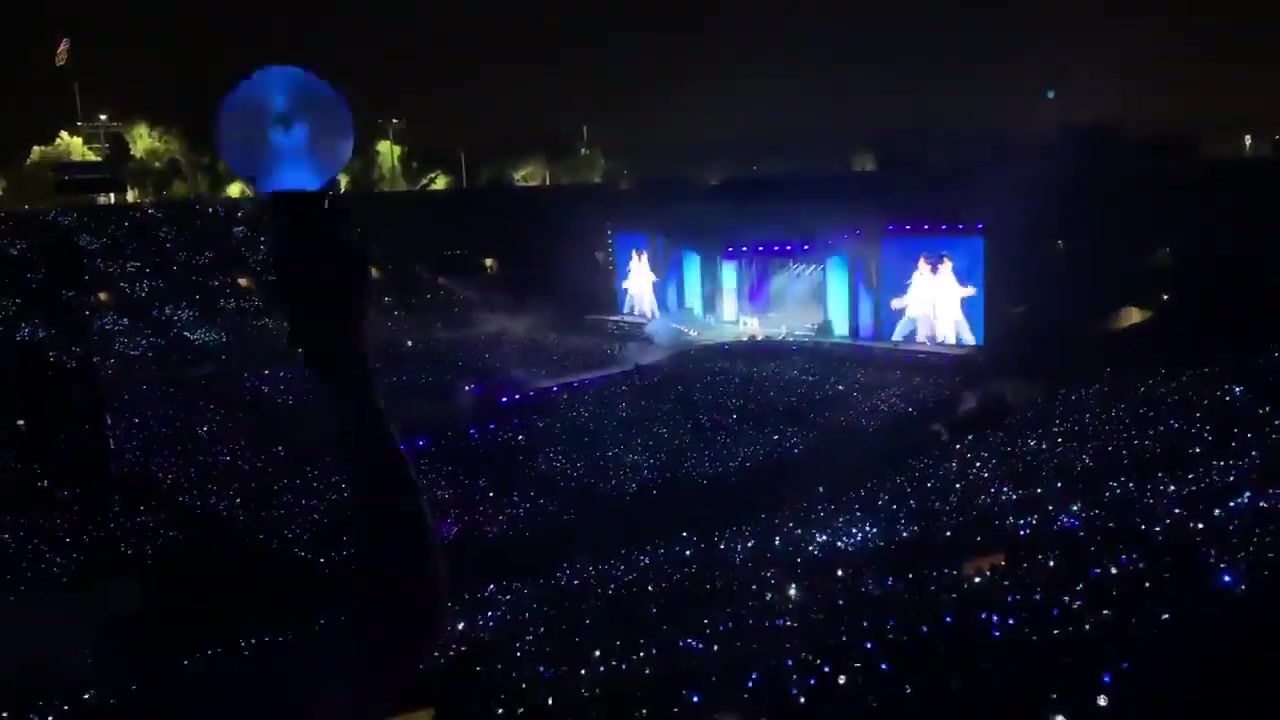
BTS Love Yourself - Speak Yourself tour at Rose Bowl, Pasadena (California), on May 4, 2019.

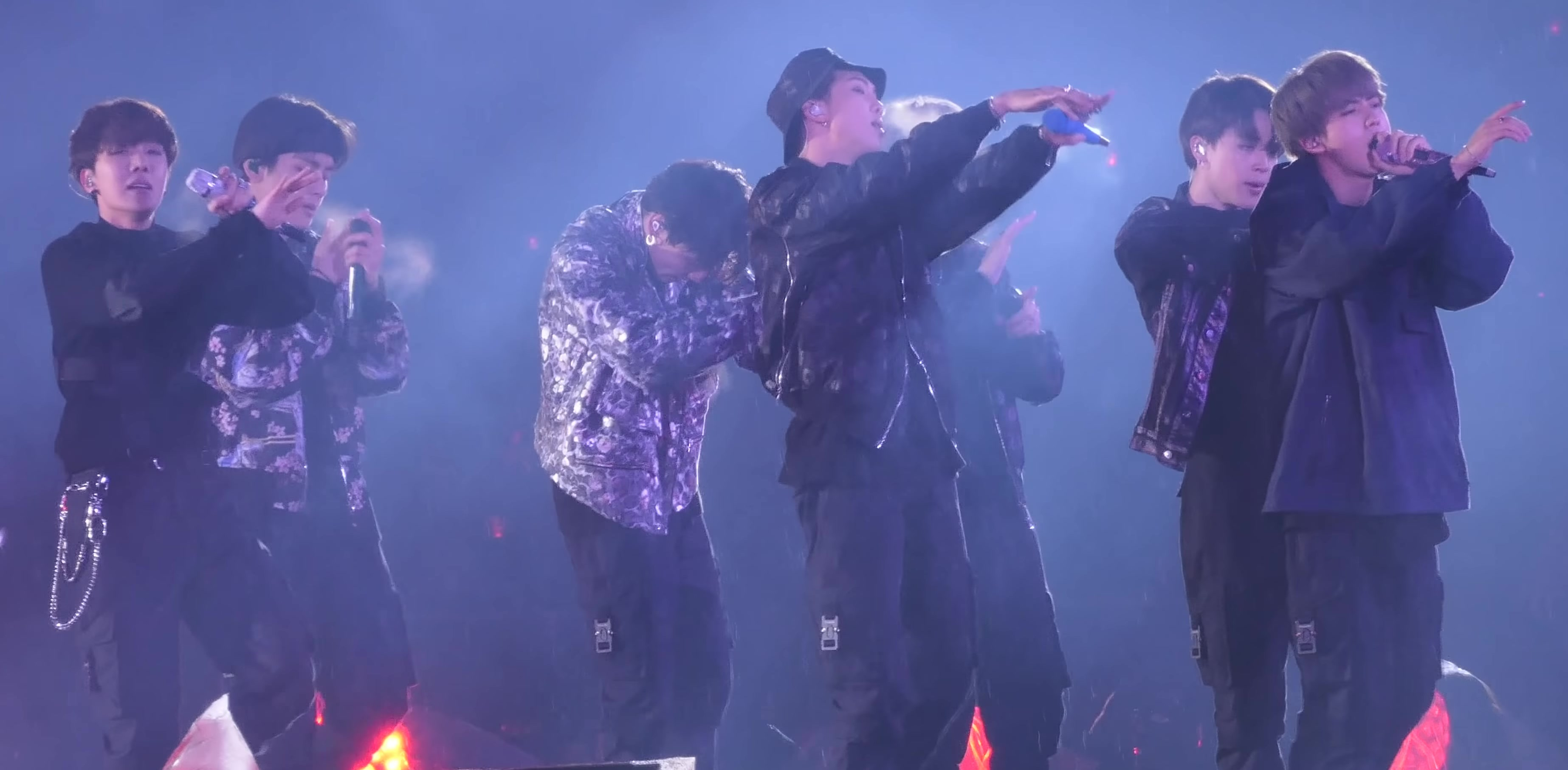
BTS performing "Mic Drop" during the Speak Yourself tour at Soldier Field, Chicago on May 12, 2019.

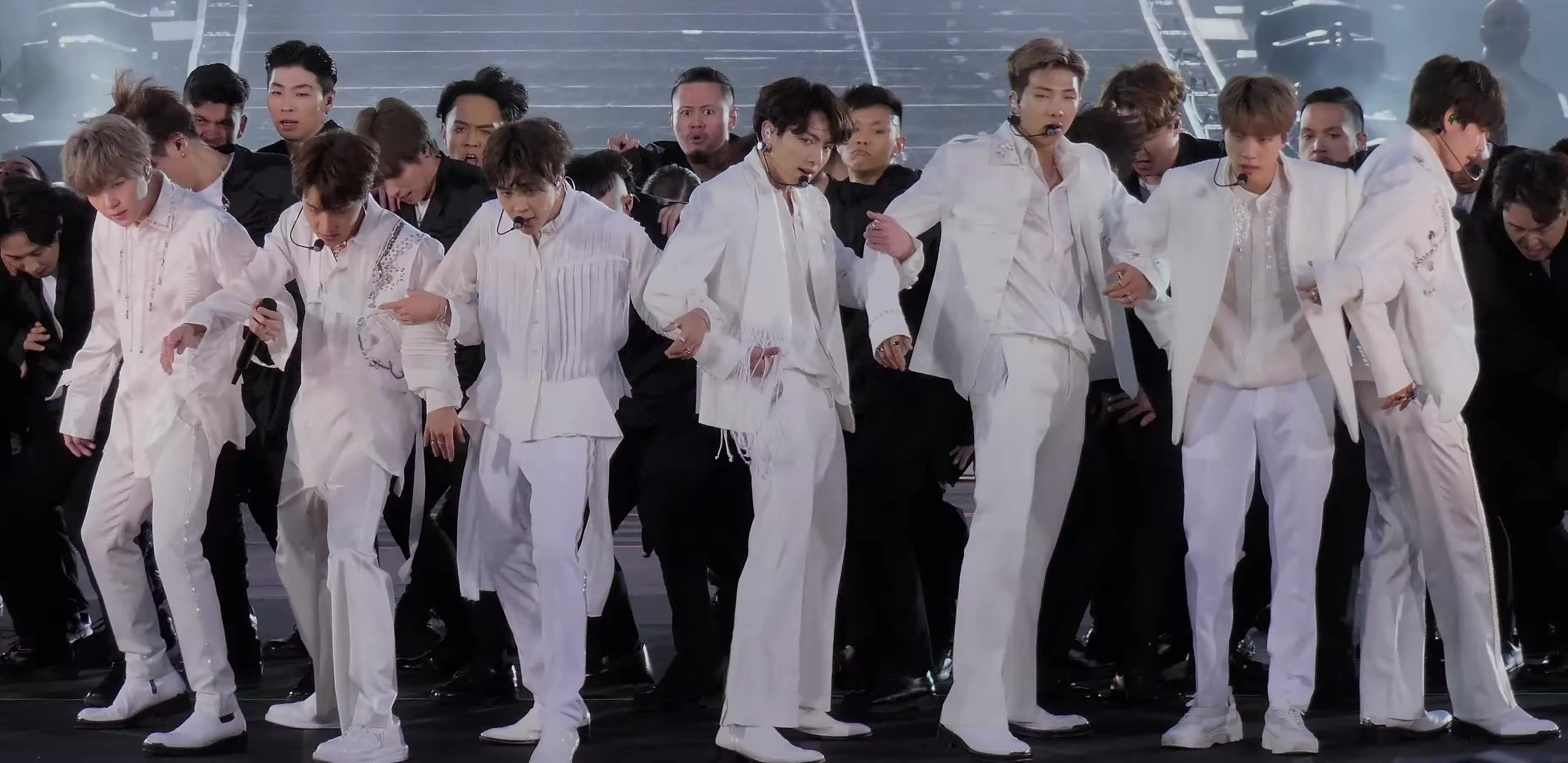
BTS performing "Not Today" during Speak Yourself tour at MetLife Stadium on May 18, 2019.

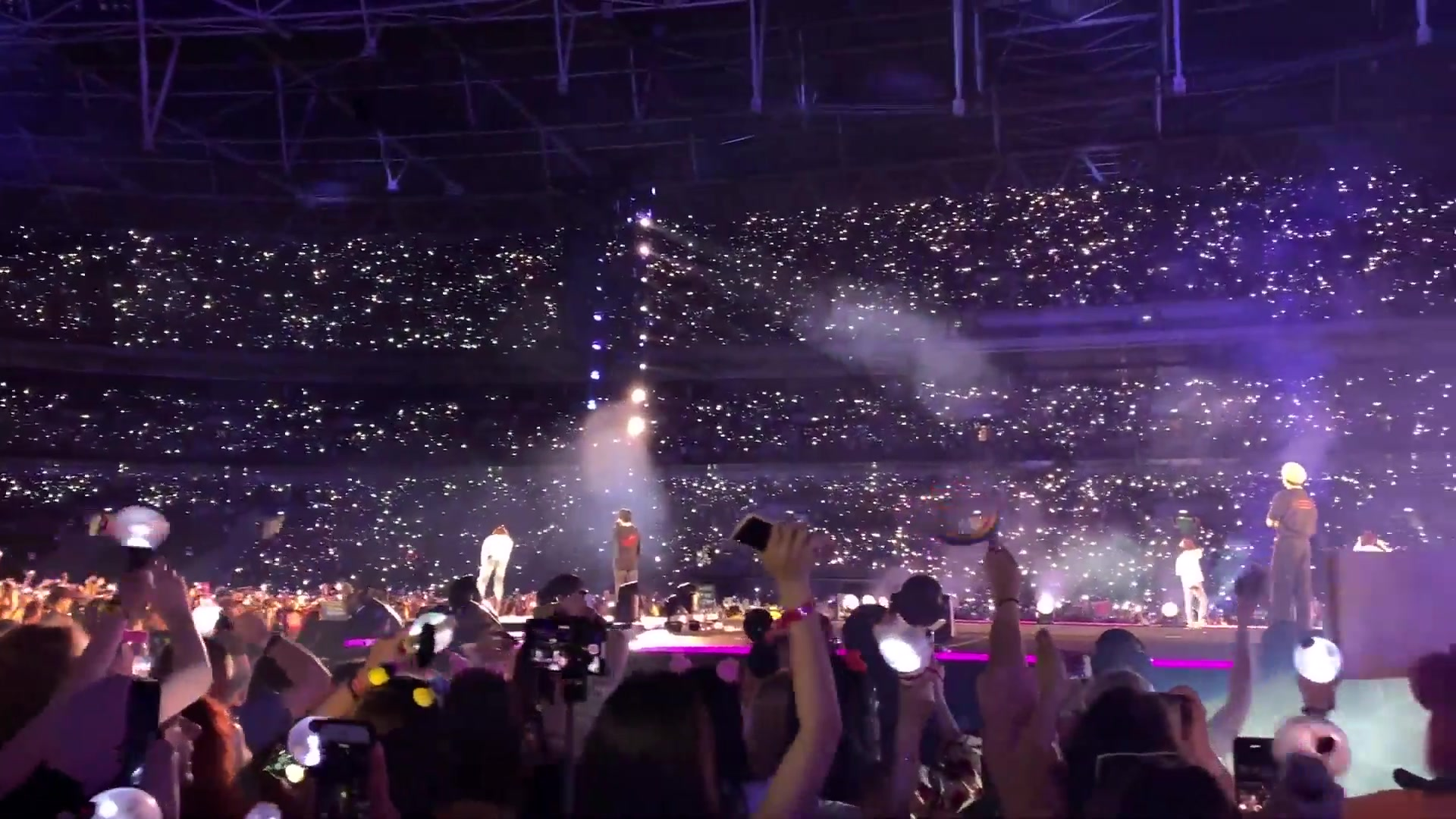
BTS in concert at Wembley Stadium on June 2, 2019.

== See also ==
- Love Yourself in Seoul — film of the concert held at the Jamsil Olympic Stadium
- Bring the Soul: The Movie — interview with the BTS members about the Love Yourself tour
- Bring the Soul: Docu-series — similar as the film in episodic format, interview with the BTS members about the Love Yourself tour
- Break the Silence — interview with the BTS members about the Love Yourself tour and Speak Yourself tour
