= Bring the Soul: The Movie =

2019 South Korean film

- Theatrical release poster
- Hangul: 브링 더 소울: 더 무비
- RR: Beuring deo soul: deo mubi
- MR: Pŭring tŏ soul: tŏ mubi
- Directed by: Park Jun-soo
- Starring: RM; Jin; Suga; J-Hope; Jimin; V; Jungkook
- Music by: BTS
- Production companies: Big Hit Entertainment; A Camp Entertainment
- Distributed by: Trafalgar Releasing
- Release date: August 7, 2019
- Running time: 103 minutes
- Country: South Korea
- Language: Korean
- Box office: $24.3 million

Bring the Soul: The Movie (Korean: 브링 더 소울: 더 무비) is a 2019 South Korean documentary film directed by Park Jun-soo, featuring South Korean boy band BTS. The film is co-produced by Big Hit Entertainment and A Camp Entertainment, and distributed by Trafalgar Releasing. It was limitedly released on August 7, 2019.

== Synopsis ==
The film alternates between performances in various cities of the band's Love Yourself World Tour and a conversation between members which was filmed "on a rooftop in Paris" following the end of the European leg in October 2018.

== Release ==
The film was first announced on June 26, 2019 on Twitter through BTS' official account. Tickets went on sale on July 3. The film was released to 110 countries around the world, the "widest-ever event cinema debut" in history.

== Reception ==
=== Box office ===
Following the film release, it was reported that Bring the Soul: The Movie has grossed $4.4 million in the United States, and $8.2 million in other territories, for a worldwide total of $12.6 million.

In the United States the film played in 873 theaters, grossing $2.3 million in its opening weekend and a total of $4.4 million over its first five days. The same weekend, it grossed an additional $8.2 million from other territories around the world.

According to Forbes, film distributor Trafalgar Releasing later announced that the film brought in $24.3 million worldwide, once again breaking the box office record for event cinema. BTS' first film, Burn the Stage: The Movie, grossed $18.5 million following a second limited run last year.

Variety later reported that "the documentary feature had sold a record 2.55 million tickets across 112 territories worldwide – the widest ever release for an event cinema title".
