= Love Yourself in Seoul =

2019 Korean film

- Theatrical release poster
- Hangul: 러브 유어셀프 인 서울
- RR: Reobeu yueoselpeu in seoul
- MR: Rŏbŭ yuŏselp'ŭ in sŏul
- Produced by: Big Hit Entertainment; CJ CGV Screen X
- Starring: RM; Jin; Suga; J-Hope; Jimin; V; Jungkook
- Music by: BTS
- Distributed by: Fathom Events; Pathé Live
- Release date: January 26, 2019
- Running time: 113 minutes
- Country: South Korea
- Language: Korean
- Box office: US$13.9 million

Love Yourself in Seoul (Korean: 러브 유어셀프 인 서울), also known as BTS World Tour: Love Yourself in Seoul, is a concert film by South Korean boy band BTS. It takes place during the August 26, 2018, show of the band's Love Yourself Tour at Seoul Olympic Stadium in Seoul, South Korea. Distribution was handled by Fathom Events and Pathé Live.

The film was given a one-day-only release in 102 countries worldwide, on January 26, 2019. Due to popular demand, it returned to theaters in select territories on February 9 and 10.

== Background and release ==
The film was first announced on December 13, 2018, on Twitter through BTS' official account. It was revealed that 42 cameras were used to shoot the film and that it was co-produced by Big Hit Entertainment and CJ CGV Screen X. The film was available in 2D and ScreenX formats.

Tickets went on sale on December 18. The trailer for the film was released the following day.

Described by Pathé Live as the "widest worldwide release ever," Love Yourself in Seoul was released in 4,100 cinemas around the world. It is 113 minutes long and upon release day trended worldwide.

Two cities in Russia, Makhachkala, Dagestan and Grozny, Chechnya, banned the film from being released after people protested it online due to "over-the-top immoral behavior" as they believed BTS showcased homosexual behavior. They made no further comment afterward.

== Set list ==
BTS featured this setlist for their Seoul concert on August 26, 2018.

1. "Idol"
2. "Save Me"
3. "I'm Fine"
4. "Magic Shop"
5. "Trivia 起: Just Dance"
6. "Euphoria"
7. "I Need U"
8. "Run"
9. "Serendipity"
10. "Trivia 承: Love"
11. "DNA"
12. "Boyz with Fun"
13. "Attack on Bangtan"
14. "Fire"
15. "Silver Spoon"
16. "Dope"
17. "Airplane Pt. 2"
18. "Singularity"
19. "Fake Love"
20. "Trivia 轉: Seesaw"
21. "Epiphany"
22. "The Truth Untold"
23. "Outro: Tear"
24. "Mic Drop"

Encore

1. "So What"
2. "Anpanman"
3. "Answer: Love Myself"

== Reception ==
=== Box office ===
The concert film grossed $11.7 million worldwide and attracted 1.2 million spectators, South Korea excluded. In South Korea it made over US$2.2 million. It broke the record for Largest Worldwide Event Cinema Release after being screened in 3,800 cinemas and 95 countries.

The film grossed £518,810, about US$682,419, from 291 sites in the UK. In Uruguay it was the second best seller on the day of release. In Argentina it was seen by 49,798 people, in Paraguay by 3,394, in Bolivia by 8,087 (coming in at first for the weekend of release), while in Mexico it sold 116,000 tickets. In Russia and Belarus it grossed 72 million and 19,735 rubles respectively. In Italy it came in sixth with 19,926 admissions and grossed €325,516, about US$371,508. In Germany there were 38,000 movie goers and in Turkey 49,102.

In South Korea it surpassed 200,000 spectators coming in as second for the two days it showed. In the US it grossed more than $3 million.

=== Critical response ===
Yim Hyun-su of The Jakarta Post stated "[While] the film manages to let fans interact with the group retrospectively[...] general moviegoers outside the fandom might struggle to get on the same level as fans."
