= Burn the Stage: The Movie =

2018 South Korean film

- Theatrical release poster
- Hangul: 번 더 스테이지: 더 무비
- RR: Beon deo seuteiji: deo mubi
- MR: Pŏn tŏ sŭt'eiji: tŏ mubi
- Directed by: Park Jun-soo
- Produced by: Yoon Ji-won
- Starring: RM; Jin; Suga; J-Hope; Jimin; V; Jungkook
- Music by: BTS
- Distributed by: Trafalgar Releasing
- Release dates: 15 November 2018 (United States); 18 January 2019 (YouTube Premium)
- Running time: 85 minutes
- Country: South Korea
- Language: Korean
- Box office: $20.34 million

Burn the Stage: The Movie (Korean: 번 더 스테이지: 더 무비) is a 2018 South Korean musical documentary film directed by Park Jun-soo and produced by Yoon Jiwon, featuring the behind-the-scenes of boy band BTS' 2017 The Wings Tour, an event known for drawing in more than half a million fans in 19 different countries around the world. It was released on 15 November 2018, and its distribution was handled by Trafalgar Releasing.

Tickets became available for pre-order on 22 October, and the movie was released in theaters on 15 November 2018, for a limited time at select theaters. The trailer for the film was released on 23 October 2018.

Due to popular demand it re-entered theaters in select countries on 5 and 6 December 2018. On its second run it beat One Direction's box office record for an event cinema release after reaching two million ticket sales.

The film was released on YouTube Premium on 18 January 2019.

== Plot ==
The 85-minute film features live performances, award show highlights, off-stage moments, and interviews with the seven members of BTS. It goes behind-the-scenes of the BTS Wings Tour to reveal the story of the band's rise to fame.

The film opens with footage of BTS-designed BT21 characters, and seconds later fans are heard chanting "BTS" and waving customised fandom light sticks while the members perform on stage. Throughout the film BTS talk about the hardships and mundane side of stardom, as well as insecurities they have faced along the way and their wish to continue growing and improving as artists.

== Adaptation ==
The film was an adaptation of the 2018 YouTube Premium docuseries Burn the Stage. There were eight episodes in total, running approximately thirty minutes each. Additionally, the first episode of the show became the 10th most watched non-music video on YouTube in Korea.

N°	Episodes	Date
1	I'd do it all	28 March 2018
2	You already have the answer	28 March 2018
3	Just give me a smile	4 April 2018
4	It's on you and I	11 April 2018
5	I can't stop	18 April 2018
6	Moonchild	25 April 2018
7	Best Of Me	2 May 2018
8	I NEED YOU	9 May 2018

== Cast ==
The cast was the members of BTS, with backstage personnel appearing at certain times.

- Kim Nam-joon
- Kim Seok-jin
- Min Yoon-gi
- Jung Ho-seok
- Park Ji-min
- Kim Tae-hyung
- Jeon Jung-kook

== Release ==
=== Box office ===
On opening day in South Korea it collected 77,260 movie goers, becoming the first live-action movie by an idol to rank in the top ten box office coming in at number five. Including the other four days left for the box office week it sold 235,732 total tickets coming in overall at four for best selling releases of the week. It earned $1.77 million the first four days of sales.

In the United States it accumulated $1.2 million on opening day for a total of $3.54 million over the three day weekend, breaking the record for highest grossing event cinema musical production which was previously set in 2014 by the band One Direction. It ranked at number ten in the box office despite selling at only 620 locations compared to the 2,000-4,000 locations for the other top ten sellers.

In Japan it came in at sixth in the box office during opening week accumulating a total of $1,343,031. In the UK it also came in at sixth making approximately $830,000, and in both Germany and Austria it made $800,000. In the Philippines and Indonesia it sold more than 100,000 tickets, and in Australia grossed $403,250 and came in at fourth.

Pre-orders for the tickets worldwide reached a count of nearly one million. It was released in 79 countries and grossed a total of $14 million in the first week. Upon popular demand it was released again in theaters and made a total of $20.34 million.

=== Critical response ===
Siddhant Adlakha of Polygon stated the film delivers on its primary focus, which is showcasing BTS in their element and showing what it is like for them during concerts and their normal day-to-day life. He reported the one notable letdown is that it avoids the performance aspect and makes it feel like it is building to a musical climax that never arrives.

Gulf News stated the movie was able to show the boys' bond with each other, all the injuries and hardships, and that despite the pressure they may be under they are still able to have fun. MensXP reported through the movie fans got to see what went behind a BTS performance, and that the movie was a "breath of fresh air".

CelebMix called Burn the Stage: The Movie a "heart-warming film that shows that behind the non-stop touring and hectic lifestyles that Korean idols live, [there] are seven normal boys with a passion for music, a passion for performing, the biggest gratitude for their ARMYS."

== Release history ==
Date	Country	Ref.
15 November 2018	Various	
25 November 2018	India	
