= List of awards and nominations received by BTS =

BTS awards and nominations
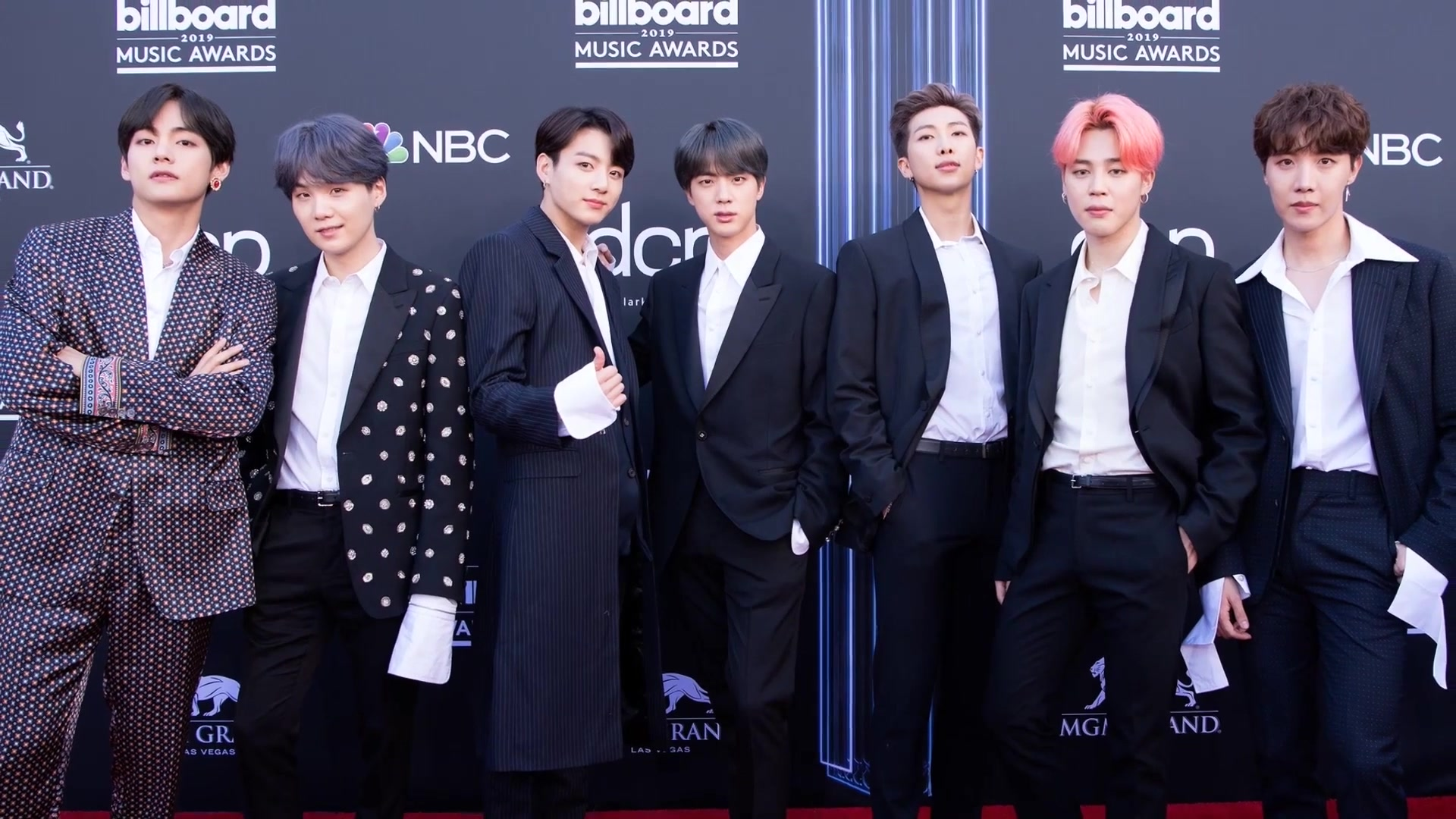
- BTS at the 2019 Billboard Music Awards
Awards and nominations
Award	Wins	Nominations
American Music Awards	14	14
Anugerah Bintang Popular Berita Harian	1	1
APAN Music Awards	3	8
ARIA Music Awards	1	1
Asia Artist Awards	14	20
Asian Pop Music Awards	1	6
The Asian Awards	1	1
BBC Radio1 Teen Awards	2	2
Billboard Music Awards	12	17
Brand of the Year Awards	2	2
BraVo Music Awards	1	1
Bravo Otto Awards	5	5
Brit Awards	0	2
Busan One Asia Festival	1	1
Circle Chart Music Awards	32	53
E! People's Choice Awards	13	18
Edaily Culture Awards	2	2
The Fact Music Awards	29	37
Filipino Music Awards	1	1
Gaffa-Prisen	4	5
Genie Music Awards	19	27
Global Awards	0	1
Golden Disc Awards	31	41
Grammy Awards	0	5
Hanteo Music Awards	11	19
Hito Music Awards	5	5
iF Design Awards	1	1
IFPI Awards	4	4
iHeartRadio MMVAs	1	1
iHeartRadio Music Awards	13	15
Japan Gold Disc Awards	34	34
Japan Record Awards	2	2
Joox Indonesia Music Awards	3	3
Joox Malaysia Top Music Awards	9	9
Jupiter Music Awards	1	1
K-Brand Index Star Awards	1	1
The-K Billboard Awards	2	2
KM Chart Awards	2	2
KOMCA Awards	2	2
Korea First Brand Awards	3	3
Korea Grand Music Awards	2	2
Korea Popular Music Awards	2	5
Korea Broadcasting Awards	5	5
Korean Music Awards	7	22
Korean PD Awards	1	1
K-World Dream Awards	15	18
LOS40 Music Awards	0	2
The Lockdown Awards	1	1
MAMA Awards	57	84
Melon Music Awards	46	64
Meus Prêmios Nick	9	12
MTV Europe Music Awards	15	21
MTV Millennial Awards	7	8
MTV Millennial Awards Brazil	6	7
MTV Movie & TV Awards	1	1
MTV Video Music Awards	13	24
MTV Video Music Awards Japan	7	10
Musa Awards	1	2
Music Awards Japan	1	2
Myx Music Awards	3	3
New Music Awards	1	1
Nickelodeon Argentina Kids' Choice Awards	2	4
Nickelodeon Colombia Kids' Choice Awards	0	1
Nickelodeon Kids' Choice Awards	10	12
Nickelodeon Mexico Kids' Choice Awards	13	14
NME Awards	1	6
NRJ Awards	2	3
Philippine K-pop Awards	4	4
Pollstar Awards	0	1
Premios Odeón	0	1
Proud Korean Awards	1	1
Radio Disney Music Awards	5	5
Rockbjörnen	3	8
RTHK International Pop Poll Awards	8	8
Seoul Music Awards	31	51
Shorty Awards	1	1
Soompi Awards	18	34
Space Shower Music Awards	3	3
Spotify Awards	1	1
SPOTV K-Pop Awards	2	2
Swiss Music Awards	0	1
Teen Choice Awards	7	7
Telehit Awards	1	2
Ticketmaster Awards	6	9
Tokopedia WIB Indonesia K-Pop Awards	2	2
Top Hit Music Awards	1	1
UK Music Video Awards	0	1
UNICEF Inspire Awards	1	1
Variety's Hitmakers	2	2
V Chart Awards	2	2
V Live Awards	9	9
Webby Awards	6	6
WSJ Innovator Awards	1	1

Totals (Note: Certain award groups do not simply award one winner. They acknowledge several different recipients, have runners-up, and have third place. Since this is a specific recognition and is different from losing an award, runner-up mentions are considered wins in this award tally. For simplification and to avoid errors, each award in this list has been presumed to have had a prior nomination.)
- Wins: 627
- Nominations: 873

BTS is a South Korean septet formed under record label Big Hit Entertainment, comprising three rappers (RM, Suga, and J-Hope) and four vocalists (Jin, Jimin, V, and Jung Kook). The group's debut single album 2 Cool 4 Skool (2013) and subsequent extended play (EP) O!RUL8,2? (2013), despite achieving little commercial success, garnered them several new artist awards during late 2013 and early 2014. They released their second EP Skool Luv Affair (2014) and first studio album Dark & Wild (2014) the following year, to a quieter awards reception; Skool Luv Affair's lead single, "Boy in Luv", received a nomination for Best Dance Performance (Male) at the 2014 Mnet Asian Music Awards, while Dark & Wild won a Disc Bonsang (Note: A Bonsang (Korean: 본상), which translates to "main prize", is a major award given at a South Korean award ceremony.) at the 2015 Golden Disc Awards. BTS' third EP The Most Beautiful Moment in Life, Pt. 1 (2015), won the Disc Bonsang at the 2016 Golden Disc Awards, while its lead single "I Need U" received the Best Male Dance award at the 2015 Melon Music Awards. The group's follow up EP, The Most Beautiful Moment in Life, Pt. 2 (2015), received an Album of the Year nomination at the 2016 Gaon Chart Music Awards, for the fourth quarter. (Note: The Gaon Chart Music Awards presents four Album of the Year awards, for each quarter of the year. Data for the award is collected through the album's first charting week and the six following.) BTS' first Korean compilation album The Most Beautiful Moment in Life: Young Forever (2016) earned BTS their first Daesang (Note: A Daesang (Korean: 대상), which translates to "grand prize", is the highest honor given out at South Korean music award ceremonies in recognition of the artist(s) with the greatest physical and digital achievements for the year.) award for Album of the Year at the 2016 Melon Music Awards and Artist of the Year at the 2016 Mnet Asian Music Awards. The album's second single, "Fire", received a Best Dance – Male nomination at the 2016 Melon Music Awards.

Their second studio album Wings (2016) won Album of the Year at the 26th Seoul Music Awards and Album of the Year – 4th Quarter at the 2017 Gaon Chart Music Awards. The album's lead single, "Blood Sweat & Tears", received a nomination for Song of the Year at the 2016 Mnet Asian Music Awards. "Spring Day", a single taken from BTS' Wings reissue You Never Walk Alone (2017), won the group their first major Song of the Year award at the 9th Melon Music Awards. Their fifth EP Love Yourself: Her (2017) and single "DNA" earned BTS the Musician of the Year title at the 15th Korean Music Awards, while the EP itself received a Disc Daesang at the 32nd Golden Disc Awards and Album of the Year – 3rd Quarter at the 2018 Gaon Chart Music Awards. BTS' third Korean studio album Love Yourself: Tear (2018) won Album of the Year at both the 2018 Melon Music Awards and the 2018 Mnet Asian Music Awards. The album's lead single "Fake Love" won both Song of the Year and Best Pop Song at the 16th Korean Music Awards. Their second Korean compilation album Love Yourself: Answer (2018) garnered BTS their third Artist of the Year at the 2018 Mnet Asian Music Awards and a Disc Daesang at the 33rd Golden Disc Awards. At the 2019 Melon Music Awards, BTS became the first group to win all Daesangs at a year-end award show with their sixth EP Map of the Soul: Persona and lead single "Boy with Luv" (2019). They also won all four Daesangs at the 2019 Mnet Asian Music Awards, making them the artist with the most Daesang wins in Mnet Asian Music Awards history, and overall. The following year, BTS further extended this record when they again won all Daesangs at both the 2020 Melon Music Awards and the 2020 Mnet Asian Music Awards. As of November 2023, they have won 67 Daesangs and remain the most-awarded artist in South Korean history.

BTS have attained 26 Guinness World Records, including for the most Twitter engagements and for the most viewed video/music video on YouTube in 24 hours, achieving the latter every year since 2018 and most recently with "Butter". The group was inducted into the record body's Hall of Fame in 2022, after claiming 13 world records in 2021 alone. They have consecutively won the Billboard Music Award for Top Social Artist since 2017; are the only K-pop group to win Top Duo/Group, at the 2019 Billboard Music Awards; and are the most-awarded group in BBMA history as of 2022, with 12 wins overall. They are also the only K-pop group to win Favorite Duo or Group – Pop/Rock and Favorite Social Artist at the American Music Awards, and in 2021, became the first Asian act in the show's history to win Artist of the Year. They are the first Korean pop act to receive a Grammy Award nomination, and the first Korean artist to be nominated for a Brit Award. With 30 awards overall, including a record four consecutive wins for Artist of the Year (Asia), BTS are the most-awarded foreign artist in the history of the Japan Gold Disc Awards. They are the only foreign artist to achieve as many consecutive wins in the aforementioned category and to receive as many awards in a single ceremony (2022). They have also placed on the Time 100, in 2019, and are the youngest recipients of the South Korean Order of Cultural Merit. In July 2021, South Korean President Moon Jae-in appointed them Special Presidential Envoy for public diplomacy.

== Awards and nominations ==
Name of the award ceremony, year presented, category, nominee(s) of the award, and the result of the nomination
Award ceremony	Year	Category	Nominee(s)/work(s)	Result	Ref.
American Music Awards	2018	Favorite Social Artist	BTS	Won	
American Music Awards	2019	Favorite Duo or Group Pop/Rock	BTS	Won	
American Music Awards	2019	Favorite Social Artist	BTS	Won	
American Music Awards	2019	Tour of the Year	BTS	Won	
American Music Awards	2020	Favorite Duo or Group – Pop/Rock	BTS	Won	
American Music Awards	2020	Favorite Social Artist	BTS	Won	
American Music Awards	2021	Artist of the Year	BTS	Won	
American Music Awards	2021	Favorite Pop Duo or Group	BTS	Won	
American Music Awards	2021	Favorite Pop Song	"Butter"	Won	
American Music Awards	2022	Favorite Duo or Group Pop/Rock	BTS	Won	
American Music Awards	2022	Favorite K-pop Artist	BTS	Won	
American Music Awards	2026	Artist of the Year	BTS	Won	
American Music Awards	2026	Song of the Summer	"Swim"	Won	
American Music Awards	2026	Best Male K-Pop Artist	BTS	Won	
Anugerah Bintang Popular Berita Harian	2019	Popular Korean Artist	BTS	Won	
APAN Music Awards	2020	APAN Top 10 (Bonsang)	BTS	Won	
APAN Music Awards	2020	Best Group – Male (Domestic)	BTS	Won	
APAN Music Awards	2020	No. 1 Achievement (Daesang)	BTS	Won	
APAN Music Awards	2020	Best Group – Male (Global)	BTS	Nominated	
APAN Music Awards	2020	Best Icon	BTS	Nominated	
APAN Music Awards	2020	Best Music Video	BTS	Nominated	
APAN Music Awards	2020	Best Performance	BTS	Nominated	
APAN Music Awards	2020	KT Seezn Star Award – Singer	BTS	Nominated	
ARIA Music Awards	2026	Most Popular International Artist	Arirang (Note: Despite the category's name, each nominee was nominated alongside their album)	Won	
Asia Artist Awards	2016	Best Artist Award – Music	BTS	Won	
Asia Artist Awards	2016	Best Icon Award – Music	BTS	Won	
Asia Artist Awards	2016	Popularity Award – Music	BTS	Nominated	
Asia Artist Awards	2017	Popularity Award – Music	BTS	Nominated	
Asia Artist Awards	2018	Artist of the Year – Music	BTS	Won	
Asia Artist Awards	2018	Daesang Award – Music	BTS	Won	
Asia Artist Awards	2018	Fabulous Award – Music	BTS	Won	
Asia Artist Awards	2018	Korean Tourism Appreciation Award	BTS	Won	
Asia Artist Awards	2018	Popularity Award – Music	BTS	Won	
Asia Artist Awards	2019	AAA X Dongnam Media & FPT Polytechnic Popularity Award	BTS	Nominated	
Asia Artist Awards	2019	Popularity Award – Music	BTS	Shortlisted	
Asia Artist Awards	2020	Best of Best Popularity Award	BTS	Won	
Asia Artist Awards	2020	Popularity Award – Singer (Male)	BTS	Won	
Asia Artist Awards	2020	Song of the Year	"Dynamite"	Won	
Asia Artist Awards	2021	Song of the Year	"Butter"	Won	
Asia Artist Awards	2021	U+IdolLive Popularity Award – Male Group	BTS	Won	
Asia Artist Awards	2021	AAA Japan Popularity Award – Idol Group (Male)	BTS	Nominated	
Asia Artist Awards	2022	Idolplus Popularity Award – Singer	BTS	Won	
Asia Artist Awards	2025	Legendary Group (Male)	BTS	Won	
Asia Artist Awards	2026	Popularity Award – Group (Male)	BTS	Pending	
Asian Pop Music Awards	2020	Album of the Year (Overseas)	Map of the Soul: 7	Nominated	
Asian Pop Music Awards	2020	Best Group (Overseas)	Map of the Soul: 7	Nominated	
Asian Pop Music Awards	2022	Best Group (Overseas)	Proof	Nominated	
Asian Pop Music Awards	2022	Top 20 Album Of the Year	Proof	Won	
Asian Pop Music Awards	2022	Album of the Year (Overseas)	Proof	Nominated	
Asian Pop Music Awards	2022	Song of the Year(Overseas)	Yet To Come	Nominated	
The Asian Awards	2018	Outstanding Achievement in Music	BTS	Won	
BBC Radio1 Teen Awards	2018	Best International Group	BTS	Won	
BBC Radio1 Teen Awards	2018	Social Media Star	BTS	Won	
Billboard Music Awards	2017	Top Social Artist	BTS	Won	
Billboard Music Awards	2018	Top Social Artist	BTS	Won	
Billboard Music Awards	2019	Top Duo/Group	BTS	Won	
Billboard Music Awards	2019	Top Social Artist	BTS	Won	
Billboard Music Awards	2020	Top Social Artist	BTS	Won	
Billboard Music Awards	2020	Top Duo/Group	BTS	Nominated	
Billboard Music Awards	2021	Top Duo/Group	BTS	Won	
Billboard Music Awards	2021	Top Selling Song	"Dynamite"	Won	
Billboard Music Awards	2021	Top Social Artist	BTS	Won	
Billboard Music Awards	2021	Top Song Sales Artist	BTS	Won	
Billboard Music Awards	2022	Top Duo/Group	BTS	Won	
Billboard Music Awards	2022	Top Selling Song	"Butter"	Won	
Billboard Music Awards	2022	Top Song Sales Artist	BTS	Won	
Billboard Music Awards	2022	Top Global 200 (Excl. U.S.) Artist	BTS	Nominated	
Billboard Music Awards	2022	Top Global 200 (Excl. U.S.) Song	"Butter"	Nominated	
Billboard Music Awards	2022	Top Rock Song (Note: shared with Coldplay)	"My Universe"	Nominated	
Billboard Music Awards	2022	Top Selling Song	"Permission to Dance"	Nominated	
Brand of the Year Awards (Note: Established in 2003, the Brand of the Year Awards is an awards ceremony based on nationwide surveys hosted by the Korea Consumer Brand Committee and organized by the Korea Consumer Forum.)	2017	Artist of the Year	BTS	Won	
Brand of the Year Awards	2026	Best Male Idol	BTS	Won	
BraVo Music Awards (Note: The International Professional "BraVo" Music Awards are an annual Russian award ceremony inaugurated in 2017 and held with the support of the Russian Ministry of Culture and the Bolshoi Theater. It celebrates the achievements of global artists in the fields of classical and popular music, with the participation of industry professionals from partnering countries like Japan, China, Indonesia, Malaysia, the Korean Republic, Mongolia, India, Singapore, and CIS countries. Winners are selected by experts within the Russian music industry, and awarded across 24 categories, equally divided between both genres.)	2019	Group of the Year	BTS	Won	
Bravo Otto	2019	Best Group/Duo	BTS	Gold	
Bravo Otto	2020	Best K-Pop	BTS	Silver	
Bravo Otto	2021	Best K-Pop	BTS	Silver	
Bravo Otto	2022	Best Group/Duo	BTS	Silver	
Bravo Otto	2023	International Singer	BTS	Gold	
Brit Awards	2021	International Group	BTS	Nominated	
Brit Awards	2022	International Group	BTS	Nominated	
Busan One Asia Festival	2017	Global Trend Star	BTS	Won	
Circle Chart Music Awards	2014	Best New Artist (Male Group)	BTS	Won	
Circle Chart Music Awards	2015	World Rookie Award	BTS	Won	
Circle Chart Music Awards	2016	K-Pop World Hallyu Star Award	BTS	Won	
Circle Chart Music Awards	2016	Album of the Year – 2nd Quarter	The Most Beautiful Moment in Life, Pt. 1	Nominated	
Circle Chart Music Awards	2016	Album of the Year – 4th Quarter	The Most Beautiful Moment in Life, Pt. 2	Nominated	
Circle Chart Music Awards	2017	Album of the Year – 4th Quarter	Wings	Won	
Circle Chart Music Awards	2017	V Live Global Popularity Award	BTS	Won	
Circle Chart Music Awards	2017	Album of the Year – 2nd Quarter	The Most Beautiful Moment in Life: Young Forever	Nominated	
Circle Chart Music Awards	2017	Song of the Year – October	"Blood Sweat & Tears"	Nominated	
Circle Chart Music Awards	2018	Album of the Year – 1st Quarter	You Never Walk Alone	Won	
Circle Chart Music Awards	2018	Album of the Year – 3rd Quarter	Love Yourself: Her	Won	
Circle Chart Music Awards	2018	Song of the Year – February	"Spring Day"	Nominated	
Circle Chart Music Awards	2018	Song of the Year – September	"DNA"	Nominated	
Circle Chart Music Awards	2019	Album of the Year – 2nd Quarter	Love Yourself: Tear	Won	
Circle Chart Music Awards	2019	Album of the Year – 3rd Quarter	Love Yourself: Answer	Won	
Circle Chart Music Awards	2019	K-pop Contribution Award	BTS	Won	
Circle Chart Music Awards	2019	Song of the Year – May	"Fake Love"	Nominated	
Circle Chart Music Awards	2019	Song of the Year – May	"The Truth Untold"	Nominated	
Circle Chart Music Awards	2019	Song of the Year – August	"Idol"	Nominated	
Circle Chart Music Awards	2020	Album of the Year – 2nd Quarter	Map of the Soul: Persona	Won	
Circle Chart Music Awards	2020	Retail Album of the Year	Map of the Soul: Persona	Won	
Circle Chart Music Awards	2020	Social Hot Star of the Year	BTS	Won	
Circle Chart Music Awards	2020	Song of the Year – April	"Boy with Luv"	Nominated	
Circle Chart Music Awards	2021	Album of the Year – 1st Quarter	Map of the Soul: 7	Won	
Circle Chart Music Awards	2021	Album of the Year – 4th Quarter	Be	Won	
Circle Chart Music Awards	2021	Retail Album of the Year	Map of the Soul: 7	Won	
Circle Chart Music Awards	2021	Song of the Year – February	"On"	Won	
Circle Chart Music Awards	2021	Song of the Year – August	"Dynamite"	Won	
Circle Chart Music Awards	2021	Song of the Year – November	"Life Goes On"	Won	
Circle Chart Music Awards	2021	Mubeat Global Choice Award – Male	BTS	Nominated	
Circle Chart Music Awards	2021	Song of the Year – January	"Black Swan"	Nominated	
Circle Chart Music Awards	2021	Song of the Year – February	"Filter"	Nominated	
Circle Chart Music Awards	2021	Song of the Year – February	"Friends"	Nominated	
Circle Chart Music Awards	2021	Song of the Year – February	"Zero O'Clock"	Nominated	
Circle Chart Music Awards	2021	Song of the Year – October	"Savage Love (Laxed – Siren Beat) (BTS Remix)"	Nominated	
Circle Chart Music Awards	2022	Album of the Year – 3rd Quarter	Butter	Won	
Circle Chart Music Awards	2022	Mubeat Global Choice Award – Male	BTS	Won	
Circle Chart Music Awards	2022	Music Steady Seller of the Year	"Dynamite"	Won	
Circle Chart Music Awards	2022	Retail Album of the Year	Butter	Won	
Circle Chart Music Awards	2022	Social Hot Star of the Year	BTS	Won	
Circle Chart Music Awards	2022	Song of the Year – May	"Butter"	Won	
Circle Chart Music Awards	2022	Song of the Year – July	"Permission to Dance"	Won	
Circle Chart Music Awards	2022	Song of the Year – September	"My Universe"	Won	
Circle Chart Music Awards	2023	Global Artist Award	BTS	Won	
Circle Chart Music Awards	2023	Global Digital Music – June	"Yet to Come"	Won	
Circle Chart Music Awards	2023	Physical Album – 3rd Quarter	Proof	Won	
Circle Chart Music Awards	2023	Retail Album of the Year	Proof	Won	
Circle Chart Music Awards	2023	Social Hot Star	BTS	Won	
Circle Chart Music Awards	2023	Global Digital Music – December 2021	"Butter (Holiday Remix)"	Nominated	
Circle Chart Music Awards	2023	Global Digital Music – June	"Born Singer"	Nominated	
Circle Chart Music Awards	2023	Global Digital Music – June	"For Youth"	Nominated	
Circle Chart Music Awards	2023	Global Digital Music – June	"Run BTS"	Nominated	
Circle Chart Music Awards	2024	Global Streaming	"Take Two"	Nominated	
E! People's Choice Awards	2018	Group of the Year	BTS	Won	
E! People's Choice Awards	2018	Music Video of the Year	"Idol"	Won	
E! People's Choice Awards	2018	Social Celebrity of the Year	BTS	Won	
E! People's Choice Awards	2018	Song of the Year	"Idol"	Won	
E! People's Choice Awards	2019	The Concert Tour of 2019	Love Yourself: Speak Yourself	Nominated	
E! People's Choice Awards	2019	The Group of 2019	BTS	Nominated	
E! People's Choice Awards	2019	The Music Video of 2019	"Boy with Luv"	Nominated	
E! People's Choice Awards	2020	The Album of 2020	Map of the Soul: 7	Won	
E! People's Choice Awards	2020	The Group of 2020	BTS	Won	
E! People's Choice Awards	2020	The Music Video of 2020	"Dynamite"	Won	
E! People's Choice Awards	2020	The Song of 2020	"Dynamite"	Won	
E! People's Choice Awards	2021	The Group of 2021	BTS	Won	
E! People's Choice Awards	2021	The Music Video of 2021	"Butter"	Won	
E! People's Choice Awards	2021	The Song of 2021	"Butter"	Won	
E! People's Choice Awards	2021	The Music Video of 2021	"My Universe"	Nominated	
E! People's Choice Awards	2022	The Concert Tour of 2022	Permission to Dance on Stage	Won	
E! People's Choice Awards	2022	The Group of 2022	BTS	Won	
E! People's Choice Awards	2022	The Music Video of 2022	"Yet to Come"	Nominated	
Edaily Culture Awards (Note: The Edaily Culture Awards are a South Korean award ceremony established in 2013 to honor the year's best achievements in six categories: theatre, classical, dance, Korean music, musicals and concerts. Winners are selected by a panel of 54 judges who are professionals in each field.)	2019	Concert Category	Love Yourself World Tour	Won	
Edaily Culture Awards	2019	Grand Prize	BTS	Won	
The Fact Music Awards	2019	Artist of the Year (Bonsang)	BTS	Won	
The Fact Music Awards	2019	Best Album	Love Yourself: Answer	Won	
The Fact Music Awards	2019	Daesang Award	BTS	Won	
The Fact Music Awards	2019	Idol Live Popularity Award	BTS	Won	
The Fact Music Awards	2019	Fan N Star Choice Award – Artist	BTS	Nominated	
The Fact Music Awards	2020	Artist of the Year (Bonsang)	BTS	Won	
The Fact Music Awards	2020	Daesang Award	BTS	Won	
The Fact Music Awards	2020	Listeners' Choice Award	BTS	Won	
The Fact Music Awards	2020	TMA Popularity Award	BTS	Won	
The Fact Music Awards	2020	Fan N Star Choice Award – Artist	BTS	Nominated	
The Fact Music Awards	2020	Artist of the Year (Bonsang)	BTS	Won	
The Fact Music Awards	2020	Daesang Award	BTS	Won	
The Fact Music Awards	2020	Listeners' Choice Award	BTS	Won	
The Fact Music Awards	2020	Worldwide Icon Award	BTS	Won	
The Fact Music Awards	2020	Fan N Star Choice Award – Artist	BTS	Nominated	
The Fact Music Awards	2020	TMA Popularity Award	BTS	Nominated	
The Fact Music Awards	2021	Artist of the Year (Bonsang)	BTS	Won	
The Fact Music Awards	2021	Daesang Award	BTS	Won	
The Fact Music Awards	2021	Fan N Star Most Voted Artist	BTS	Won	
The Fact Music Awards	2021	Listeners' Choice Award	BTS	Won	
The Fact Music Awards	2021	U+Idol Live Popularity Award	BTS	Won	
The Fact Music Awards	2021	Best ADs. Award	BTS	Nominated	
The Fact Music Awards	2021	Fan N Star Choice Award – Artist	BTS	Nominated	
The Fact Music Awards	2022	Artist of the Year (Bonsang)	BTS	Won	
The Fact Music Awards	2022	Daesang Award	BTS	Won	
The Fact Music Awards	2022	Fan N Star Choice Award – Artist	BTS	Won	
The Fact Music Awards	2022	Fan N Star Most Voted Artist	BTS	Won	
The Fact Music Awards	2022	Global Fan N Star Award	BTS	Won	
The Fact Music Awards	2022	Idolplus Popularity Award	BTS	Won	
The Fact Music Awards	2022	Best ADs. Award	BTS	Nominated	
The Fact Music Awards	2023	Best Music – Summer	"Take Two"	Won	
The Fact Music Awards	2023	Fan N Star Choice Award – Group	BTS	Won	
The Fact Music Awards	2023	Fan N Star Most Voted	BTS	Won	
The Fact Music Awards	2023	Best ADs. Award	BTS	Nominated	
The Fact Music Awards	2026	Fan N Star Choice Award – Group	BTS	Won	
The Fact Music Awards	2026	Best Music – Spring	"Swim"	Won	
The Fact Music Awards	2026	Best Music – Summer	"Hooligan"	Won	
Filipino Music Awards	2026	People's Choice Awards: International Artist	BTS	Won	
Gaffa-Prisen	2019	Best International Album	Love Yourself: Answer	Won	
Gaffa-Prisen	2019	Best International Band	BTS	Won	
Gaffa-Prisen	2019	Best New International Name	BTS	Nominated	
Gaffa-Prisen	2021	Best International Album	Map of the Soul: 7	Won	
Gaffa-Prisen	2021	Best International Band	BTS	Won	
Genie Music Awards	2018	Artist of the Year	BTS	Won	
Genie Music Awards	2018	Album of the Year (Digital)	Love Yourself: Answer	Won	
Genie Music Awards	2018	Best Dance Performance (Male)	"Idol"	Won	
Genie Music Awards	2018	Best Music Video	"Idol"	Won	
Genie Music Awards	2018	Best Fandom	BTS	Won	
Genie Music Awards	2018	Best Group (Male)	BTS	Won	
Genie Music Awards	2018	Best Style	BTS	Won	
Genie Music Awards	2018	Genie Music Popularity Award	BTS	Won	
Genie Music Awards	2018	Idol Champ Global Popularity Award	BTS	Won	
Genie Music Awards	2018	Best Rap/Hip Hop Performance	"Fake Love"	Nominated	
Genie Music Awards	2018	Song of the Year	"Fake Love"	Nominated	
Genie Music Awards	2018	Song of the Year	"Idol"	Nominated	
Genie Music Awards	2018	Best-Selling Artist of the Year	BTS	Nominated	
Genie Music Awards	2019	Genie Music Popularity Award	BTS	Won	
Genie Music Awards	2019	Global Popularity Award	BTS	Won	
Genie Music Awards	2019	The Male Group	BTS	Won	
Genie Music Awards	2019	Performing Artist (Male)	BTS	Won	
Genie Music Awards	2019	Top Artist	BTS	Won	
Genie Music Awards	2019	Top Video	BTS	Won	
Genie Music Awards	2019	The Best-Selling Artist	BTS	Nominated	
Genie Music Awards	2019	The Top Music	BTS	Nominated	
Genie Music Awards	2020	Album of the Year	Map of the Soul: 7	Won	
Genie Music Awards	2020	Best Single – Dance	"Dynamite"	Won	
Genie Music Awards	2020	Artist of the Year	BTS	Nominated	
Genie Music Awards	2022	Best Male Group	BTS	Won	
Genie Music Awards	2022	Global Popularity Award	BTS	Won	
Genie Music Awards	2022	Album of the Year	Proof	Nominated	
Global Awards	2022	Best Group	BTS	Nominated	
Golden Disc Awards	2014	Rookie of the Year	BTS	Won	
Golden Disc Awards	2015	Disc Bonsang	Dark & Wild	Won	
Golden Disc Awards	2015	Disc Daesang (Note: At the Golden Disc Awards, the daesang (grand prize) winner is chosen out of the ten bonsang (main prize) winners.)	Dark & Wild	Shortlisted	
Golden Disc Awards	2016	Disc Bonsang	The Most Beautiful Moment in Life, Pt. 1	Won	
Golden Disc Awards	2016	Disc Daesang	The Most Beautiful Moment in Life, Pt. 1	Shortlisted	
Golden Disc Awards	2016	Global Popularity Award	BTS	Nominated	
Golden Disc Awards	2017	Disc Bonsang	Wings	Won	
Golden Disc Awards	2017	Global K-Pop Artist Award	BTS	Won	
Golden Disc Awards	2017	Asia Popularity Award	BTS	Nominated	
Golden Disc Awards	2017	Disc Daesang	Wings	Shortlisted	
Golden Disc Awards	2018	Digital Bonsang	"Spring Day"	Won	
Golden Disc Awards	2018	Disc Bonsang	Love Yourself: Her	Won	
Golden Disc Awards	2018	Disc Daesang	Love Yourself: Her	Won	
Golden Disc Awards	2018	Digital Daesang	"Spring Day"	Shortlisted	
Golden Disc Awards	2018	Global Popularity Award	BTS	Nominated	
Golden Disc Awards	2019	Digital Bonsang	"Fake Love"	Won	
Golden Disc Awards	2019	Disc Bonsang	Love Yourself: Answer	Won	
Golden Disc Awards	2019	Disc Daesang	Love Yourself: Answer	Won	
Golden Disc Awards	2019	Global V Live Best Artist Award	BTS	Won	
Golden Disc Awards	2019	Most Popular K-pop Star	BTS	Won	
Golden Disc Awards	2019	Popularity Award	BTS	Won	
Golden Disc Awards	2019	Digital Daesang	"Fake Love"	Shortlisted	
Golden Disc Awards	2020	Digital Bonsang	"Boy with Luv"	Won	
Golden Disc Awards	2020	Digital Daesang	"Boy with Luv"	Won	
Golden Disc Awards	2020	Disc Bonsang	Map of the Soul: Persona	Won	
Golden Disc Awards	2020	Disc Daesang	Map of the Soul: Persona	Won	
Golden Disc Awards	2020	Fans' Choice K-pop Star Award	BTS	Won	
Golden Disc Awards	2020	Popularity Award	BTS	Won	
Golden Disc Awards	2021	Album of the Year (Daesang)	Map of the Soul: 7	Won	
Golden Disc Awards	2021	Best Album (Bonsang)	Map of the Soul: 7	Won	
Golden Disc Awards	2021	Best Digital Song (Bonsang)	"Dynamite"	Won	
Golden Disc Awards	2021	Most Popular Artist Award	BTS	Won	
Golden Disc Awards	2021	Digital Daesang	"Dynamite"	Shortlisted	
Golden Disc Awards	2021	Fans' Choice K-pop Star Award	BTS	Nominated	
Golden Disc Awards	2022	Album of the Year (Daesang)	Be	Won	
Golden Disc Awards	2022	Best Album (Bonsang)	Be	Won	
Golden Disc Awards	2022	Best Digital Song (Bonsang)	"Butter"	Won	
Golden Disc Awards	2022	Most Popular Artist Award	BTS	Won	
Golden Disc Awards	2023	Album of the Year	Proof	Won	
Golden Disc Awards	2023	Best Album (Bonsang)	Proof	Won	
Golden Disc Awards	2023	TikTok Most Popular Artist Award	BTS	Won	
Grammy Awards	2021	Best Pop Duo/Group Performance	"Dynamite"	Nominated	
Grammy Awards	2022	Best Pop Duo/Group Performance	"Butter"	Nominated	
Grammy Awards	2023	Best Pop Duo/Group Performance	"My Universe"	Nominated	
Grammy Awards	2023	Album of the Year	Music of the Spheres (Note: as featured artist)	Nominated	
Grammy Awards	2023	Best Music Video	"Yet to Come (The Most Beautiful Moment)"	Nominated	
Hanteo Music Awards	2016	Album Award	Wings	Won	
Hanteo Music Awards	2017	Album Award	You Never Walk Alone	Won	
Hanteo Music Awards	2022	Artist Award – Male Group	BTS	Won	
Hanteo Music Awards	2022	Initial Chodong Record Award (Note: translates to "First Week Sales Record Award")	BTS	Won	
Hanteo Music Awards	2022	WhosFandom Award	BTS	Won	
Hanteo Music Awards	2023	Artist of the Year	BTS	Won	
Hanteo Music Awards	2023	Best Artist	BTS	Won	
Hanteo Music Awards	2023	Best Song	BTS	Won	
Hanteo Music Awards	2023	Global Artist Award	BTS	Won	
Hanteo Music Awards	2023	WhosFandom Award	BTS	Won	
Hanteo Music Awards	2025	Global Popular Artist	BTS	Won	
Hanteo Music Awards	2025	Best Continent Artist – Africa	BTS	Nominated	
Hanteo Music Awards	2025	Best Continent Artist – Asia	BTS	Nominated	
Hanteo Music Awards	2025	Best Continent Artist – Europe	BTS	Nominated	
Hanteo Music Awards	2025	Best Continent Artist – North America	BTS	Nominated	
Hanteo Music Awards	2025	Best Continent Artist – Oceania	BTS	Nominated	
Hanteo Music Awards	2025	Best Continent Artist – South America	BTS	Nominated	
Hanteo Music Awards	2025	WhosFandom Award	BTS	Nominated	
Hanteo Music Awards	2025	Best Popular Artist	BTS	Nominated	
Hito Music Awards	2019	Asian Song of the Year	"Fake Love"	Won	
Hito Music Awards	2020	Asian Song of the Year	"Boy with Luv"	Won	
Hito Music Awards	2021	Asian Song of the Year	"On"	Won	
Hito Music Awards	2021	Western Song of the Year	"Dynamite"	Won	
Hito Music Awards	2022	Western Song of the Year	"Butter"	Won	
iF Product Design Awards	2018	Corporate Identity and Branding Award	BTS	Won	
IFPI Awards	2020	Global Album All Format Album Award	Map of the Soul: 7	Won	
IFPI Awards	2020	Global Album Sales Award	Map of the Soul: 7	Won	
IFPI Awards	2020	Global Recording Artist of 2020	BTS	Won	
IFPI Awards	2021	Global Recording Artist of 2021	BTS	Won	
iHeartRadio MMVAs	2018	Fan Fave Duo or Group	BTS	Won	
iHeartRadio Music Awards	2018	Best Boy Band	BTS	Won	
iHeartRadio Music Awards	2018	Best Fan Army	BTS	Won	
iHeartRadio Music Awards	2019	Best Fan Army	BTS	Won	
iHeartRadio Music Awards	2020	Best Fan Army	BTS	Won	
iHeartRadio Music Awards	2020	Best Music Video	"Boy with Luv"	Won	
iHeartRadio Music Awards	2021	Best Fan Army	BTS	Won	
iHeartRadio Music Awards	2021	Best Music Video	"Dynamite"	Won	
iHeartRadio Music Awards	2021	Favorite Music Video Choreography	"Dynamite"	Won	
iHeartRadio Music Awards	2021	Best Duo/Group of the Year	BTS	Nominated	
iHeartRadio Music Awards	2022	Best Fan Army	BTS	Won	
iHeartRadio Music Awards	2022	Best Music Video	"Butter"	Won	
iHeartRadio Music Awards	2022	Best Duo/Group of the Year	BTS	Nominated	
iHeartRadio Music Awards	2023	Best Fan Army	BTS	Won	
iHeartRadio Music Awards	2023	Best Music Video	"Yet to Come"	Won	
iHeartRadio Music Awards	2024	Best Fan Army	BTS	Won	
Japan Gold Disc Awards	2015	Best 3 New Artists (Asia)	BTS	Won	
Japan Gold Disc Awards	2015	New Artist of the Year (Asia)	BTS	Won	
Japan Gold Disc Awards	2017	Best 3 Albums (Asia)	Youth	Won	
Japan Gold Disc Awards	2019	Album of the Year (Asia)	Face Yourself	Won	
Japan Gold Disc Awards	2019	Best 3 Albums (Asia)	Face Yourself	Won	
Japan Gold Disc Awards	2019	Best 3 Albums (Asia)	Love Yourself: Answer	Won	
Japan Gold Disc Awards	2019	Best Asian Artist	BTS	Won	
Japan Gold Disc Awards	2019	Best Music Video Recording (Asia)	2017 BTS Live Trilogy Episode III: The Wings Tour ~Special Edition~ at Kyocera Dome	Won	
Japan Gold Disc Awards	2020	Best 5 Singles	"Lights/Boy with Luv"	Won	
Japan Gold Disc Awards	2020	Best Asian Artist	BTS	Won	
Japan Gold Disc Awards	2020	Best Music Video (Asia)	BTS World Tour: Love Yourself (Japan Edition)	Won	
Japan Gold Disc Awards	2020	Song of the Year by Download (Asia)	"Lights"	Won	
Japan Gold Disc Awards	2021	Album of the Year (Asia)	Map of the Soul: 7 – The Journey	Won	
Japan Gold Disc Awards	2021	Best 3 Albums (Asia)	Map of the Soul: 7	Won	
Japan Gold Disc Awards	2021	Best 3 Albums (Asia)	Map of the Soul: 7 – The Journey	Won	
Japan Gold Disc Awards	2021	Best 5 Songs by Streaming	"Dynamite"	Won	
Japan Gold Disc Awards	2021	Best Artist (Asia)	BTS	Won	
Japan Gold Disc Awards	2021	Music Video of the Year (Asia)	BTS World Tour Love Yourself: Speak Yourself (Japan Edition)	Won	
Japan Gold Disc Awards	2021	Song of the Year by Download (Asia)	"Dynamite"	Won	
Japan Gold Disc Awards	2021	Song of the Year by Streaming (Asia)	"Dynamite"	Won	
Japan Gold Disc Awards	2022	Album of the Year (Asia)	BTS, the Best	Won	
Japan Gold Disc Awards	2022	Best 3 Albums (Asia)	BTS, the Best	Won	
Japan Gold Disc Awards	2022	Best 5 Songs by Download	"Butter"	Won	
Japan Gold Disc Awards	2022	Best 5 Songs by Streaming	"Butter"	Won	
Japan Gold Disc Awards	2022	Best 5 Songs by Streaming	"Permission to Dance"	Won	
Japan Gold Disc Awards	2022	Best Artist (Asia)	BTS	Won	
Japan Gold Disc Awards	2022	Music Video of the Year (Asia)	Map of the Soul ON:E	Won	
Japan Gold Disc Awards	2022	Song of the Year by Download (Asia)	"Butter"	Won	
Japan Gold Disc Awards	2022	Song of the Year by Download (Western Music)	"My Universe"	Won	
Japan Gold Disc Awards	2022	Song of the Year by Streaming (Asia)	"Butter"	Won	
Japan Gold Disc Awards	2023	Best 3 Albums (Asia)	Proof	Won	
Japan Gold Disc Awards	2023	Best Artist (Asia)	BTS	Won	
Japan Gold Disc Awards	2023	Music Video of the Year (Asia)	BTS 2021 Muster Sowoozoo	Won	
Japan Gold Disc Awards	2023	Song of the Year by Download (Asia)	"Yet to Come"	Won	
Japan Record Awards	2020	Special International Music Award	BTS	Won	
Japan Record Awards	2021	Special International Music Award	BTS	Won	
Joox Indonesia Music Awards	2021	Korean Artist of the Year	BTS	Won	
Joox Indonesia Music Awards	2021	Best Fanbase of the Year	BTS	Won	
Joox Indonesia Music Awards	2021	Global Song of the Year	"Dynamite"	Won	
Joox Malaysia Top Music Awards	2020	Most Popular: K-Pop	"Life Goes On"	Won	
Joox Malaysia Top Music Awards	2020	Top 5 Hits: K-Pop (Year End 2020)	"Dynamite"	Won	
Joox Malaysia Top Music Awards	2020	Top 5 Hits of the Year: International	"Who (with Lauv)"	Won	
Joox Malaysia Top Music Awards	2020	Top 5 Hits of the Year: K-Pop	"Dynamite"	Won	
Joox Malaysia Top Music Awards	2020	Top 5 Hits of the Year: K-Pop	"On"	Won	
Joox Malaysia Top Music Awards	2021	Top 5 Hits: International	"Permission to Dance"	Won	
Joox Malaysia Top Music Awards	2021	Top 5 Hits: International	"My Universe (with Coldplay)"	Won	
Joox Malaysia Top Music Awards	2021	Top Fans Pick	BTS	Won	
Joox Malaysia Top Music Awards	2021	Top 5 Hits: K-Pop (Mid Year)	"Butter"	Won	
Jupiter Music Awards	2024	Most Popular Duo / Group	BTS	Won	
The-K Billboard Awards	2022	Top Artist	BTS	Won	
The-K Billboard Awards	2022	Global Artist	BTS	Won	
K-Brand Index Star Awards	2026	Grand Prize	BTS	Won	
KM Chart Awards	2026	Album of the Year (Daesang)	Arirang	Won	
KM Chart Awards	2026	Ultimate 12 (Bonsang)	BTS	Won	
KOMCA Awards	2021	Song of the Year	"Boy with Luv"	Won	
KOMCA Awards	2022	Song of the Year	"Dynamite"	Won	
Korea First Brand Awards (Note: The Korea First Brand Awards is hosted by the Korea Consumer Brand Committee and the Korea Consumer Forum. Awards are based on a nationwide survey held in South Korea.)	2019	Male Idol of the Year	BTS	Won	
Korea First Brand Awards	2020	Male Idol of the Year	BTS	Won	
Korea First Brand Awards	2021	Male Idol of the Year	BTS	Won	
Korea Grand Music Awards	2026	Best Artist (Bonsang)	BTS	Won	
Korea Grand Music Awards	2026	Best Selling Album	Arirang	Won	
Korea Popular Music Awards (Note: The Korea Popular Music Awards were jointly established in 2018 by the Korea Singers Association, the Korea Entertainment Producer’s Association, the Recording Industry Association of Korea, the Federation of Korean Music Performers, and the Korea Music Copyright Association.)	2018	Best Album of the Year	Love Yourself: Answer	Won	
Korea Popular Music Awards	2018	Bonsang Award	BTS	Won	
Korea Popular Music Awards	2018	Best Artist	BTS	Nominated	
Korea Popular Music Awards	2018	Best Digital Song	"Idol"	Nominated	
Korea Popular Music Awards	2018	Popularity Award	BTS	Nominated	
Korea Broadcasting Awards	2017	Best Artist Award	BTS	Won	
Korea Broadcasting Awards	2018	Best Artist Award	BTS	Won	
Korea Broadcasting Awards	2020	Best Artist Award	BTS	Won	
Korea Broadcasting Awards	2021	Best Male Artist	BTS	Won	
Korea Broadcasting Awards	2021	Popularity Award – Artist	BTS	Won	
Korean Music Awards	2018	Musician of the Year	BTS	Won	
Korean Music Awards	2018	Best Pop Album	Love Yourself: Her	Nominated	
Korean Music Awards	2018	Best Pop Song	"DNA"	Nominated	
Korean Music Awards	2018	Song of the Year	"DNA"	Nominated	
Korean Music Awards	2019	Best Pop Song	"Fake Love"	Won	
Korean Music Awards	2019	Musician of the Year	BTS	Won	
Korean Music Awards	2019	Song of the Year	"Fake Love"	Won	
Korean Music Awards	2019	Album of the Year	Love Yourself: Answer	Nominated	
Korean Music Awards	2019	Best Pop Album	Love Yourself: Answer	Nominated	
Korean Music Awards	2019	Best Pop Song	"Idol"	Nominated	
Korean Music Awards	2019	Song of the Year	"Idol"	Nominated	
Korean Music Awards	2020	Best Pop Song	"Boy with Luv"	Nominated	
Korean Music Awards	2020	Musician of the Year	BTS	Nominated	
Korean Music Awards	2020	Song of the Year	"Boy with Luv"	Nominated	
Korean Music Awards	2021	Best Pop Song	"Dynamite"	Won	
Korean Music Awards	2021	Song of the Year	"Dynamite"	Won	
Korean Music Awards	2021	Album of the Year	Map of the Soul: 7	Nominated	
Korean Music Awards	2021	Best Pop Album	Map of the Soul: 7	Nominated	
Korean Music Awards	2021	Musician of the Year	BTS	Nominated	
Korean Music Awards	2022	Musician of the Year	BTS	Won	
Korean Music Awards	2022	Best K-pop Song	"Butter"	Nominated	
Korean Music Awards	2022	Song of the Year	"Butter"	Nominated	
Korean PD Awards (Note: Hosted by the Korean Producers and Directors Association (KPDA), the annual "Korean PD Awards" honours broadcasting producers, officials, and entertainers who have contributed to the development of broadcasting culture and the implementation of free media. Up to 2007, the ceremony was known as the "Korea Broadcast Producer Award". Winners are chosen by members of the association who vote for nominees in various fields of entertainment.)	2021	Performer Award	BTS	Won	
K-World Dream Awards	2017	Hallyu Star	BTS	Won	
K-World Dream Awards	2017	Bonsang Award	BTS	Nominated	
K-World Dream Awards	2018	Bonsang Award	BTS	Won	
K-World Dream Awards	2018	Daesang Award	BTS	Won	
K-World Dream Awards	2018	World Social Artist Award	BTS	Won	
K-World Dream Awards	2018	Global Fandom Award	BTS	Nominated	
K-World Dream Awards	2018	Popularity Award (Male)	BTS	Nominated	
K-World Dream Awards	2019	Bonsang Award	BTS	Won	
K-World Dream Awards	2019	Daesang Award – Artist of the Year	BTS	Won	
K-World Dream Awards	2019	Popularity Award (Male)	BTS	Won	
K-World Dream Awards	2020	Bonsang Award	BTS	Won	
K-World Dream Awards	2020	Daesang Award	BTS	Won	
K-World Dream Awards	2020	Popularity Award (Male)	BTS	Won	
K-World Dream Awards	2022	Popularity Award (Male Group)	BTS	Won	
K-World Dream Awards	2023	Choeaedol Male Group Popularity Award	BTS	Won	
K-World Dream Awards	2026	Best Artist Award	BTS	Won	
K-World Dream Awards	2026	Artist of the Year	BTS	Won	
K-World Dream Awards	2026	Best Album Award	Arirang	Won	
LOS40 Music Awards	2021	Best International Act	BTS	Nominated	
LOS40 Music Awards	2021	Best International Song	"Dynamite"	Nominated	
The Lockdown Awards (Note: The Lockdown Awards presented by LiveXLive is an award focuses on performances that took place virtually or in large outdoor areas during the COVID-19 pandemic.)	2020	Favorite Quaranteam	BTS	Won	
MAMA Awards	2013	Best New Male Artist	BTS	Nominated	
MAMA Awards	2014	Best Dance Performance – Male Group	"Boy in Luv"	Nominated	
MAMA Awards	2015	World Performer	BTS	Won	
MAMA Awards	2015	Best Male Group	BTS	Nominated	
MAMA Awards	2015	Album of the Year	The Most Beautiful Moment in Life, Pt. 1	Shortlisted	
MAMA Awards	2016	Best Dance Performance – Male Group	"Blood Sweat & Tears"	Won	
MAMA Awards	2016	Artist of the Year	BTS	Won	
MAMA Awards	2016	Best Male Group	BTS	Nominated	
MAMA Awards	2016	Best Music Video	"Blood Sweat & Tears"	Nominated	
MAMA Awards	2016	Album of the Year	Wings	Shortlisted	
MAMA Awards	2016	Song of the Year	"Blood Sweat & Tears"	Nominated	
MAMA Awards	2016	iQiyi Worldwide Favorite Artist	BTS	Nominated	
MAMA Awards	2017	Best Asian Style in Hong Kong	BTS	Won	
MAMA Awards	2017	Artist of the Year	BTS	Won	
MAMA Awards	2017	Best Music Video	"Spring Day"	Won	
MAMA Awards	2017	Best Dance Performance – Male Group	"DNA"	Nominated	
MAMA Awards	2017	Best Male Group	BTS	Nominated	
MAMA Awards	2017	Qoo10 2017 Favorite K-Pop Star	BTS	Nominated	
MAMA Awards	2017	Mwave Global Fans' Choice	"DNA"	Nominated	
MAMA Awards	2017	Album of the Year	Love Yourself: Her	Shortlisted	
MAMA Awards	2017	Song of the Year	"DNA"	Longlisted	
MAMA Awards	2018	Album of the Year	Love Yourself: Tear	Won	
MAMA Awards	2018	Artist of the Year	BTS	Won	
MAMA Awards	2018	Best Asian Style	BTS	Won	
MAMA Awards	2018	Favorite Dance Artist (Male)	BTS	Won	
MAMA Awards	2018	Favorite Music Video	"Idol"	Won	
MAMA Awards	2018	Best Music Video	"Idol"	Won	
MAMA Awards	2018	Mwave Global Fans' Choice	"Fake Love"	Won	
MAMA Awards	2018	Worldwide Fans' Choice Top 10	BTS	Won	
MAMA Awards	2018	Worldwide Icon of the Year	BTS	Won	
MAMA Awards	2018	Best Dance Performance – Male Group	"Fake Love"	Nominated	
MAMA Awards	2018	Song of the Year	"Fake Love"	Nominated	
MAMA Awards	2018	Best Male Group	BTS	Nominated	
MAMA Awards	2019	Album of the Year	Map of the Soul: Persona	Won	
MAMA Awards	2019	Artist of the Year	BTS	Won	
MAMA Awards	2019	Best Dance Performance – Male Group	BTS	Won	
MAMA Awards	2019	Best Male Group	BTS	Won	
MAMA Awards	2019	Best Music Video	BTS	Won	
MAMA Awards	2019	Qoo10 Favorite Male Artist	BTS	Won	
MAMA Awards	2019	Song of the Year	"Boy with Luv"	Won	
MAMA Awards	2019	Worldwide Fans Choice	BTS	Won	
MAMA Awards	2019	Worldwide Icon of the Year	BTS	Won	
MAMA Awards	2020	2020 Visionary	BTS	Won	
MAMA Awards	2020	Album of the Year	Map of the Soul: 7	Won	
MAMA Awards	2020	Artist of the Year	BTS	Won	
MAMA Awards	2020	Best Male Group	BTS	Won	
MAMA Awards	2020	Best Dance Performance – Male Group	"Dynamite"	Won	
MAMA Awards	2020	Best Music Video	"Dynamite"	Won	
MAMA Awards	2020	Song of the Year	"Dynamite"	Won	
MAMA Awards	2020	Worldwide Fans Choice Top 10	BTS	Won	
MAMA Awards	2020	Worldwide Icon of the Year	BTS	Won	
MAMA Awards	2021	2021 Visionary	BTS	Won	
MAMA Awards	2021	Album of the Year	Be	Won	
MAMA Awards	2021	Artist of the Year	BTS	Won	
MAMA Awards	2021	Best Dance Performance – Male Group	"Butter"	Won	
MAMA Awards	2021	Best Male Group	BTS	Won	
MAMA Awards	2021	Best Music Video	"Butter"	Won	
MAMA Awards	2021	Song of the Year	"Butter"	Won	
MAMA Awards	2021	TikTok Favorite Moment	BTS	Won	
MAMA Awards	2021	Worldwide Fans Choice Top 10	BTS	Won	
MAMA Awards	2021	Worldwide Icon of the Year	BTS	Won	
MAMA Awards	2021	Best Collaboration	"My Universe"	Nominated	
MAMA Awards	2021	Song of the Year	"My Universe"	Nominated	
MAMA Awards	2022	Album of the Year	Proof	Won	
MAMA Awards	2022	Artist of the Year	BTS	Won	
MAMA Awards	2022	Best Male Group	BTS	Won	
MAMA Awards	2022	MAMA Platinum	BTS	Won	
MAMA Awards	2022	Worldwide Fans Choice Top 10	BTS	Won	
MAMA Awards	2022	Worldwide Icon of the Year	BTS	Won	
MAMA Awards	2022	Best Vocal Performance – Group	"Yet to Come (The Most Beautiful Moment)"	Nominated	
MAMA Awards	2022	Song of the Year	"Yet to Come (The Most Beautiful Moment)"	Nominated	
MAMA Awards	2023	Worldwide Fans Choice	BTS	Won	
MAMA Awards	2023	Worldwide Icon of the Year	BTS	Won	
MAMA Awards	2023	Best OST	"The Planet"	Won	
MAMA Awards	2023	Best Vocal Performance – Group	"Take Two"	Nominated	
MAMA Awards	2023	Song of the Year	"Take Two"	Nominated	
MAMA Awards	2023	Song of the Year	"The Planet"	Nominated	
MAMA Awards	2026	Artist of The Year	BTS	Won	
MAMA Awards	2026	Best Male Group	BTS	Won	
MAMA Awards	2026	Fan Choice-Male	BTS	Won	
MAMA Awards	2026	Album of the Year	Arirang	Won	
MAMA Awards	2026	Best Song Top 10	"Swim"	Won	
MAMA Awards	2026	Song of The Year	"Swim"	Nominated	
MAMA Awards	2026	Best Vocal Performance - Group	"Swim"	Nominated	
MAMA Awards	2026	Best Music Video	"2.0"	Nominated	
Melon Music Awards	2013	New Artist of the Year	BTS	Won	
Melon Music Awards	2015	Best Dance – Male	"I Need U"	Won	
Melon Music Awards	2015	Top 10 Artists	BTS	Nominated	
Melon Music Awards	2016	Album of the Year	The Most Beautiful Moment in Life: Young Forever	Won	
Melon Music Awards	2016	Top 10 Artists	BTS	Won	
Melon Music Awards	2016	Best Dance – Male	"Fire"	Nominated	
Melon Music Awards	2016	Kakao Hot Star	BTS	Nominated	
Melon Music Awards	2016	Netizen Popularity Award	BTS	Nominated	
Melon Music Awards	2017	Best Music Video	"DNA"	Won	
Melon Music Awards	2017	Global Artist	BTS	Won	
Melon Music Awards	2017	Song of the Year	"Spring Day"	Won	
Melon Music Awards	2017	Top 10 Artists	BTS	Won	
Melon Music Awards	2017	Album of the Year	You Never Walk Alone	Nominated	
Melon Music Awards	2017	Artist of the Year	BTS	Nominated	
Melon Music Awards	2017	Best Dance – Male	"DNA"	Nominated	
Melon Music Awards	2017	Kakao Hot Star Award	BTS	Nominated	
Melon Music Awards	2017	Netizen Popularity Award	BTS	Nominated	
Melon Music Awards	2018	Album of the Year	Love Yourself: Tear	Won	
Melon Music Awards	2018	Artist of the Year	BTS	Won	
Melon Music Awards	2018	Best Rap/Hip Hop Song	"Fake Love"	Won	
Melon Music Awards	2018	Global Artist Award	BTS	Won	
Melon Music Awards	2018	Kakao Hot Star Award	BTS	Won	
Melon Music Awards	2018	Netizen Popularity Award	BTS	Won	
Melon Music Awards	2018	Top 10 Artists	BTS	Won	
Melon Music Awards	2018	Song of the Year	"Fake Love"	Nominated	
Melon Music Awards	2019	Album of the Year	Map of the Soul: Persona	Won	
Melon Music Awards	2019	Artist of the Year	BTS	Won	
Melon Music Awards	2019	Best Dance – Male	"Boy with Luv"	Won	
Melon Music Awards	2019	Kakao Hot Star Award	BTS	Won	
Melon Music Awards	2019	Netizen's Favorite Artist	BTS	Won	
Melon Music Awards	2019	Record of the Year	BTS	Won	
Melon Music Awards	2019	Song of the Year	"Boy with Luv"	Won	
Melon Music Awards	2019	Top 10 Artists	BTS	Won	
Melon Music Awards	2020	Album of the Year	Map of the Soul: 7	Won	
Melon Music Awards	2020	Artist of the Year	BTS	Won	
Melon Music Awards	2020	Best Dance – Male	"Dynamite"	Won	
Melon Music Awards	2020	Netizen Popularity Award	BTS	Won	
Melon Music Awards	2020	Song of the Year	"Dynamite"	Won	
Melon Music Awards	2020	Top 10 Artists	BTS	Won	
Melon Music Awards	2020	Best Pop	"Savage Love (Laxed – Siren Beat) (BTS Remix)"	Nominated	
Melon Music Awards	2020	Best Rap/Hip Hop	"On"	Nominated	
Melon Music Awards	2021	Best Collaboration	"My Universe"	Won	
Melon Music Awards	2021	Best Male Group	BTS	Won	
Melon Music Awards	2021	Netizen Popularity Award	BTS	Won	
Melon Music Awards	2021	Song of the Year	"Butter"	Won	
Melon Music Awards	2021	Top 10 Artists	BTS	Won	
Melon Music Awards	2021	Album of the Year	Be	Nominated	
Melon Music Awards	2022	Best Male Group	BTS	Won	
Melon Music Awards	2022	Everyone's Star	BTS	Won	
Melon Music Awards	2022	Record of the Year	BTS	Won	
Melon Music Awards	2022	Top 10 Artists	BTS	Won	
Melon Music Awards	2022	Artist of the Year	BTS	Nominated	
Melon Music Awards	2022	Netizen Popularity Award	BTS	Nominated	
Melon Music Awards	2023	Favourite Star Award	BTS	Won	
Melon Music Awards	2023	Top 10 Artists	BTS	Won	
Melon Music Awards	2023	Artist of the Year	BTS	Longlisted	
Melon Music Awards	2023	Best Male Group	BTS	Nominated	
Melon Music Awards	2026	Artist of The Year	BTS	Won	
Melon Music Awards	2026	Album of The Year	Arirang	Won	
Melon Music Awards	2026	Song of The Year	Swim	Nominated	
Melon Music Awards	2026	Stage of The Year	Arirang World Tour	Won	
Melon Music Awards	2026	Best Group – Male	BTS	Won	
Melon Music Awards	2026	Top 10 Artist	BTS	Won	
Melon Music Awards	2026	Global Top 10 Artist	BTS	Won	
Meus Prêmios Nick	2017	International Show of the Year	The Wings Tour	Won	
Meus Prêmios Nick	2018	Fandom of the Year	BTS	Won	
Meus Prêmios Nick	2019	Favorite International Artist	BTS	Won	
Meus Prêmios Nick	2019	Favorite International Hit	"Boy with Luv"	Won	
Meus Prêmios Nick	2019	Fandom of the Year	BTS	Nominated	
Meus Prêmios Nick	2020	Fandom of the Year	BTS	Nominated	
Meus Prêmios Nick	2020	Favorite International Artist	BTS	Nominated	
Meus Prêmios Nick	2021	Challenge Hits of the Year	"Permission to Dance"	Won	
Meus Prêmios Nick	2021	Fandom of the Year	BTS	Won	
Meus Prêmios Nick	2021	Favorite International Hit	"Butter"	Won	
Meus Prêmios Nick	2021	Favorite Music Group	BTS	Won	
Meus Prêmios Nick	2021	Video of the Year	"Butter"	Won	
MTV Europe Music Awards	2014	Best Korean Act	BTS	Nominated	
MTV Europe Music Awards	2015	Best Korean Act	BTS	Won	
MTV Europe Music Awards	2015	Best Worldwide Act: Asia	BTS	Nominated	
MTV Europe Music Awards	2018	Biggest Fans	BTS	Won	
MTV Europe Music Awards	2018	Best Group	BTS	Won	
MTV Europe Music Awards	2019	Biggest Fans	BTS	Won	
MTV Europe Music Awards	2019	Best Group	BTS	Won	
MTV Europe Music Awards	2019	Best Live	BTS	Won	
MTV Europe Music Awards	2019	Best Collaboration	BTS	Nominated	
MTV Europe Music Awards	2020	Biggest Fans	BTS	Won	
MTV Europe Music Awards	2020	Best Group	BTS	Won	
MTV Europe Music Awards	2020	Best Song	"Dynamite"	Won	
MTV Europe Music Awards	2020	Best Virtual Live	Bang Bang Con: The Live	Won	
MTV Europe Music Awards	2020	Best Pop	"Dynamite"	Nominated	
MTV Europe Music Awards	2021	Best Group	BTS	Won	
MTV Europe Music Awards	2021	Best K-Pop	BTS	Won	
MTV Europe Music Awards	2021	Best Pop	BTS	Won	
MTV Europe Music Awards	2021	Biggest Fans	BTS	Won	
MTV Europe Music Awards	2022	Biggest Fans	BTS	Won	
MTV Europe Music Awards	2022	Best K-Pop	BTS	Nominated	
MTV Europe Music Awards	2022	Best Metaverse Performance	BTS (Minecraft)	Nominated	
MTV Millennial Awards	2018	Fandom of the Year	BTS	Won	
MTV Millennial Awards	2018	K-Pop Revolution	BTS	Won	
MTV Millennial Awards	2019	K-Pop Explosion	BTS	Won	
MTV Millennial Awards	2019	Fandom of the Year	BTS	Nominated	
MTV Millennial Awards	2021	Fandom of the Year	BTS	Won	
MTV Millennial Awards	2021	K-Pop Dominion	BTS	Won	
MTV Millennial Awards	2022	Global Hit of the Year	"My Universe"	Won	
MTV Millennial Awards	2022	K-Pop Dominion	BTS	Won	
MTV Millennial Awards Brazil	2018	K-Pop Explosion	BTS	Won	
MTV Millennial Awards Brazil	2018	Fandom of the Year	BTS	Won	
MTV Millennial Awards Brazil	2019	K-Pop Explosion	BTS	Won	
MTV Millennial Awards Brazil	2019	Fandom of the Year	BTS	Won	
MTV Millennial Awards Brazil	2020	Fandom of the Year	BTS	Won	
MTV Millennial Awards Brazil	2022	Global Hit	"My Universe"	Won	
MTV Millennial Awards Brazil	2022	Fandom of the Year	BTS	Nominated	
MTV Movie & TV Awards	2021	Best Music Documentary	Break the Silence: The Movie	Won	
MTV Video Music Awards	2019	Best Group	BTS	Won	
MTV Video Music Awards	2019	Best K-Pop	"Boy with Luv"	Won	
MTV Video Music Awards	2019	Best Art Direction	"Boy with Luv"	Nominated	
MTV Video Music Awards	2019	Best Choreography	"Boy with Luv"	Nominated	
MTV Video Music Awards	2019	Best Collaboration	"Boy with Luv"	Nominated	
MTV Video Music Awards	2020	Best Choreography	"On"	Won	
MTV Video Music Awards	2020	Best Group	BTS	Won	
MTV Video Music Awards	2020	Best K-Pop	"On"	Won	
MTV Video Music Awards	2020	Best Pop	"On"	Won	
MTV Video Music Awards	2021	Best K-Pop	"Butter"	Won	
MTV Video Music Awards	2021	Group of the Year	BTS	Won	
MTV Video Music Awards	2021	Song of Summer	"Butter"	Won	
MTV Video Music Awards	2021	Best Choreography	"Butter"	Nominated	
MTV Video Music Awards	2021	Best Editing	"Butter"	Nominated	
MTV Video Music Awards	2021	Best Pop	"Butter"	Nominated	
MTV Video Music Awards	2021	Song of the Year	"Dynamite"	Nominated	
MTV Video Music Awards	2022	Group of the Year	BTS	Won	
MTV Video Music Awards	2022	Best Choreography	"Permission to Dance"	Nominated	
MTV Video Music Awards	2022	Best K-pop	"Yet to Come"	Nominated	
MTV Video Music Awards	2022	Best Metaverse Performance	BTS (Minecraft)	Nominated	
MTV Video Music Awards	2022	Best Visual Effects	"My Universe"	Nominated	
MTV Video Music Awards	2026	Song of the year	"Swim"	Won	
MTV Video Music Awards	2026	Best K-pop	"Swim"	Won	
MTV Video Music Awards	2026	Best Group	BTS	Won	
MTV Video Music Awards Japan	2018	Best Group Video – International	"Fake Love"	Won	
MTV Video Music Awards Japan	2019	Best Buzz Award	BTS	Won	
MTV Video Music Awards Japan	2020	Best Group Video – International	"Dynamite"	Won	
MTV Video Music Awards Japan	2020	Video of the Year	"Dynamite"	Nominated	
MTV Video Music Awards Japan	2021	Best Collaboration Video	"My Universe"	Won	
MTV Video Music Awards Japan	2021	Best Group Video – International	"Butter"	Won	
MTV Video Music Awards Japan	2021	Video of the Year	"Butter"	Nominated	
MTV Video Music Awards Japan	2026	Artist of The Year	BTS	Won	
MTV Video Music Awards Japan	2026	Best Group Video-International	Swim	Won	
MTV Video Music Awards Japan	2026	Video of The Year	Swim	Nominated	
Musa Awards	2020	International Anglo Song of the Year	"Dynamite"	Nominated	
Musa Awards	2021	International Collaboration of the Year	"My Universe"	Won	
Music Awards Japan	2025	Best K-pop Song in Japan	"Dynamite"	Nominated	
Music Awards Japan	2026	Best K-pop Artist	BTS	Won	
Myx Music Awards	2019	Favorite International Video	"Fake Love"	Won	
Myx Music Awards	2020	Favorite International Video	"Boy with Luv"	Won	
Myx Music Awards	2021	Favorite International Video	"Dynamite"	Won	
New Music Awards	2022	Top40/CHR Group of the Year	BTS	Won	
Nickelodeon Argentina Kids' Choice Awards	2017	Best Fandom	BTS	Nominated	
Nickelodeon Argentina Kids' Choice Awards	2017	Favorite International Artist or Group	BTS	Nominated	
Nickelodeon Argentina Kids' Choice Awards	2018	Best Fandom	BTS	Won	
Nickelodeon Argentina Kids' Choice Awards	2018	Favorite International Artist or Group	BTS	Won	
Nickelodeon Colombia Kids' Choice Awards	2017	Best Fandom	BTS	Nominated	
Nickelodeon Kids' Choice Awards	2018	Favorite Global Music Star	BTS	Won	
Nickelodeon Kids' Choice Awards	2020	Favorite Music Group	BTS	Won	
Nickelodeon Kids' Choice Awards	2020	Favorite Global Music Star	BTS	Nominated	
Nickelodeon Kids' Choice Awards	2021	Favorite Global Music Star	BTS	Won	
Nickelodeon Kids' Choice Awards	2021	Favorite Music Group	BTS	Won	
Nickelodeon Kids' Choice Awards	2021	Favorite Song	"Dynamite"	Won	
Nickelodeon Kids' Choice Awards	2022	Favorite Music Group	BTS	Won	
Nickelodeon Kids' Choice Awards	2022	Favorite Global Music Star	BTS	Nominated	
Nickelodeon Kids' Choice Awards	2023	Favorite Music Group	BTS	Won	
Nickelodeon Kids' Choice Awards	2026	Favorite Music Group	BTS	Won	
Nickelodeon Kids' Choice Awards	2026	Favorite Song	"Swim"	Won	
Nickelodeon Kids' Choice Awards	2026	Favorite Album	Arirang	Won	
Nickelodeon Mexico Kids' Choice Awards	2017	Favorite International Artist or Group	BTS	Won	
Nickelodeon Mexico Kids' Choice Awards	2017	Best Fandom	BTS	Nominated	
Nickelodeon Mexico Kids' Choice Awards	2018	Best Fandom	BTS	Won	
Nickelodeon Mexico Kids' Choice Awards	2019	Best Fandom	BTS	Won	
Nickelodeon Mexico Kids' Choice Awards	2019	Favorite International Artist or Group	BTS	Won	
Nickelodeon Mexico Kids' Choice Awards	2020	Favorite Fandom	BTS	Won	
Nickelodeon Mexico Kids' Choice Awards	2020	World Hit	"On"	Won	
Nickelodeon Mexico Kids' Choice Awards	2021	Best Fandom	BTS	Won	
Nickelodeon Mexico Kids' Choice Awards	2021	Best K-Pop	BTS	Won	
Nickelodeon Mexico Kids' Choice Awards	2021	World Hit	"Butter"	Won	
Nickelodeon Mexico Kids' Choice Awards	2022	Best Fandom	BTS	Won	
Nickelodeon Mexico Kids' Choice Awards	2022	Favourite Global Artist	BTS	Won	
Nickelodeon Mexico Kids' Choice Awards	2022	Favourite K-Pop Group	BTS	Won	
Nickelodeon Mexico Kids' Choice Awards	2022	International Hit of the Year	"My Universe"	Won	
NME Awards	2020	Music Moment of the Year	BTS	Won	
NME Awards	2020	Best Band in the World	BTS	Nominated	
NME Awards	2020	Best Collaboration	"Boy with Luv"	Nominated	
NME Awards	2020	Best Music Film	Bring the Soul: The Movie	Nominated	
NME Awards	2022	Best Collaboration	"My Universe"	Nominated	
NME Awards	2022	Best Song in the World	"Butter"	Nominated	
NRJ Music Awards	2020	Best International Group	BTS	Won	
NRJ Music Awards	2021	International Collaboration of the Year	"My Universe"	Won	
NRJ Music Awards	2026	International Male Artist of The Year	BTS	Nominated	
Philippine K-pop Awards	2015	Song of the Year	"I Need U"	Won	
Philippine K-pop Awards	2016	Best Male Group	BTS	Won	
Philippine K-pop Awards	2017	Album of the Year	Love Yourself: Her	Won	
Philippine K-pop Awards	2018	Best Male Group	BTS	Won	
Pollstar Awards	2022	Pop Tour of the Year	Permission to Dance on Stage	Nominated	
Premios Odeón (Note: The Spanish-based Premios Odeón was inaugurated in 2020 by the Asociación De Gestión De Derechos Intelectuales (AGEDI) in conjunction with Promusicae and APECAT. A replacement for the Amigo Awards last held in 2001, and cancelled in 2002 due to the decline of the domestic music industry at that time, the Odeóns were launched in response to a surge in music sales and streaming in Spain between 2018 and 2019 as a way to "spotlight Spain's thriving music scene". The awards honour Spanish, Latin, and International acts.)	2021	Odeón International Artist	BTS	Nominated	
Proud Korean Awards (Note: The Proud Korean Awards are hosted by the Journalists Association of Korea (JAK), the largest organization of professional journalists in Korea, established in 1964, with a membership of over 10,000 individual journalists working for the nation's newspaper companies, broadcasting services, Internet news, and news agencies. Previous recipients include former UN Secretary General Ban Ki-moon, film director Bong Joon-ho, and former South Korean President Moon Jae-in.)	2018	National Prestige Award – Music	BTS	Won	
Radio Disney Music Awards	2018	Best Dance Track	"Mic Drop"	Won	
Radio Disney Music Awards	2018	Best Music Group	BTS	Won	
Radio Disney Music Awards	2018	Best Song That Makes You Smile	"DNA"	Won	
Radio Disney Music Awards	2018	Fiercest Fans	BTS	Won	
Radio Disney Music Awards	2019	Global Phenom Award	BTS	Won	
Rockbjörnen	2020	Best Fans	BTS	Won	
Rockbjörnen	2020	Foreign Song of the Year	"On"	Won	
Rockbjörnen	2021	Foreign Song of the Year	"Dynamite"	Won	
Rockbjörnen	2021	Best Fans	BTS	Nominated	
Rockbjörnen	2022	Best Fans	BTS	Nominated	
Rockbjörnen	2022	Foreign Song of the Year	"My Universe"	Nominated	
Rockbjörnen	2026	Best Fans	BTS	Nominated	
Rockbjörnen	2026	Foreign Song of the Year	"Swim"	Nominated	
RTHK International Pop Poll Awards	2019	The Best Selling Korean Album	"Love Yourself: Tear"	Won	
RTHK International Pop Poll Awards	2020	Top ten International Gold Songs	"Boy With Luv"(featuringHalsey)	Won	
RTHK International Pop Poll Awards	2020	Top Band/Group	BTS	Gold	
RTHK International Pop Poll Awards	2020	The Best Selling Korean Album	"Map of the Soul: 7"	Won	
RTHK International Pop Poll Awards	2021	Top ten International Gold Songs	"Dynamite"	Won	
RTHK International Pop Poll Awards	2021	Top Band/Group	BTS	Silver	
RTHK International Pop Poll Awards	2022	Top ten International Gold Songs	"Butter"	Won	
RTHK International Pop Poll Awards	2022	Top Band/Group	BTS	Bronze	
Seoul Music Awards	2014	Best New Artist	BTS	Won	
Seoul Music Awards	2015	Bonsang Award	BTS	Won	
Seoul Music Awards	2015	Hallyu Special Award	BTS	Nominated	
Seoul Music Awards	2015	Popularity Award	BTS	Nominated	
Seoul Music Awards	2016	Bonsang Award	BTS	Won	
Seoul Music Awards	2016	Hallyu Special Award	BTS	Nominated	
Seoul Music Awards	2016	Popularity Award	BTS	Nominated	
Seoul Music Awards	2017	Album of the Year	Wings	Won	
Seoul Music Awards	2017	Best Male Dance Performance	BTS	Won	
Seoul Music Awards	2017	Best Music Video	"Blood Sweat & Tears"	Won	
Seoul Music Awards	2017	Bonsang Award	BTS	Won	
Seoul Music Awards	2017	Artist of the Year	BTS	Nominated	
Seoul Music Awards	2017	Hallyu Special Award	BTS	Nominated	
Seoul Music Awards	2017	Popularity Award	BTS	Nominated	
Seoul Music Awards	2018	Artist of the Year	BTS	Won	
Seoul Music Awards	2018	Bonsang Award	BTS	Won	
Seoul Music Awards	2018	Hallyu Special Award	BTS	Nominated	
Seoul Music Awards	2018	Popularity Award	BTS	Nominated	
Seoul Music Awards	2019	Album of the Year	Love Yourself: Tear	Won	
Seoul Music Awards	2019	Artist of the Year	BTS	Won	
Seoul Music Awards	2019	Bonsang Award	BTS	Won	
Seoul Music Awards	2019	Hallyu Special Award	BTS	Nominated	
Seoul Music Awards	2019	Popularity Award	BTS	Nominated	
Seoul Music Awards	2020	Album Daesang	Map of the Soul: Persona	Won	
Seoul Music Awards	2020	Bonsang Award	Map of the Soul: Persona	Won	
Seoul Music Awards	2020	K-Wave Award	BTS	Nominated	
Seoul Music Awards	2020	Popularity Award	BTS	Nominated	
Seoul Music Awards	2020	QQ Music Most Popular K-Pop Artist Award	BTS	Nominated	
Seoul Music Awards	2021	Best Album	Map of the Soul: 7	Won	
Seoul Music Awards	2021	Best Song	"Dynamite"	Won	
Seoul Music Awards	2021	Bonsang Award	Map of the Soul: 7	Won	
Seoul Music Awards	2021	Grand Award (Daesang)	BTS	Won	
Seoul Music Awards	2021	K-Wave Popularity Award	BTS	Won	
Seoul Music Awards	2021	WhosFandom Award	BTS	Won	
Seoul Music Awards	2021	Fan PD Artist Award	BTS	Nominated	
Seoul Music Awards	2021	Popularity Award	BTS	Nominated	
Seoul Music Awards	2022	Bonsang Award	BTS	Won	
Seoul Music Awards	2022	World Best Artist	BTS	Won	
Seoul Music Awards	2022	U+Idol Live Best Artist Award	BTS	Won	
Seoul Music Awards	2022	K-wave Popularity Award	BTS	Nominated	
Seoul Music Awards	2022	Popularity Award	BTS	Nominated	
Seoul Music Awards	2023	Best Album Award	Proof	Won	
Seoul Music Awards	2023	Best Artist Award	BTS	Won	
Seoul Music Awards	2023	Bonsang Award	BTS	Won	
Seoul Music Awards	2023	K-wave Popularity Award	BTS	Nominated	
Seoul Music Awards	2023	Popularity Award	BTS	Nominated	
Seoul Music Awards	2023	World Trend Artist – April	BTS	Won	
Seoul Music Awards	2023	World Trend Artist – May	BTS	Won	
Seoul Music Awards	2023	World Trend Artist – June	BTS	Won	
Seoul Music Awards	2024	World Trend Artist	BTS	Won	
Seoul Music Awards	2026	Special Hallyu Award	BTS	Won	
Shorty Awards	2017	Best in Music	BTS	Won	
Soompi Awards	2014	Rookie of the Year	BTS	Won	
Soompi Awards	2015	Best Choreography	"Danger"	Nominated	
Soompi Awards	2015	Best Fandom	BTS	Nominated	
Soompi Awards	2016	Best Choreography	"Dope"	Won	
Soompi Awards	2016	Best Stage Outfit	"Dope"	Won	
Soompi Awards	2016	Breakout Artist	BTS	Won	
Soompi Awards	2016	Album of the Year	The Most Beautiful Moment in Life, Pt. 1	Nominated	
Soompi Awards	2016	Artist of the Year	BTS	Nominated	
Soompi Awards	2016	Best Male Group	BTS	Nominated	
Soompi Awards	2016	Best Music Video	"I Need U"	Nominated	
Soompi Awards	2017	Album of the Year	Wings	Won	
Soompi Awards	2017	Song of the Year	"Blood Sweat & Tears"	Won	
Soompi Awards	2017	Fuse Music Video of the Year	"Blood Sweat & Tears"	Nominated	
Soompi Awards	2017	Artist of the Year	BTS	Nominated	
Soompi Awards	2017	Best Fandom	BTS	Nominated	
Soompi Awards	2017	Best Male Group	BTS	Nominated	
Soompi Awards	2017	Best Choreography	"Fire"	Nominated	
Soompi Awards	2018	Album of the Year	You Never Walk Alone	Won	
Soompi Awards	2018	Artist of the Year	BTS	Won	
Soompi Awards	2018	Best Choreography	"DNA"	Won	
Soompi Awards	2018	Fuse Video of the Year	"DNA"	Won	
Soompi Awards	2018	Song of the Year	"DNA"	Won	
Soompi Awards	2018	Best Collaboration	"Mic Drop"	Won	
Soompi Awards	2018	Best Male Group	BTS	Nominated	
Soompi Awards	2018	Twitter Best Fandom	BTS	Nominated	
Soompi Awards	2019	Album of the Year	Love Yourself: Answer	Won	
Soompi Awards	2019	Artist of the Year	BTS	Won	
Soompi Awards	2019	Best Collaboration	"Waste It On Me"	Won	
Soompi Awards	2019	Best Male Group	BTS	Won	
Soompi Awards	2019	Best Web Series	Burn the Stage	Won	
Soompi Awards	2019	Music Video of the Year	"Fake Love"	Won	
Soompi Awards	2019	Song of the Year	"Fake Love"	Nominated	
Soompi Awards	2019	Latin America Popularity Award	BTS	Nominated	
Soompi Awards	2019	Twitter Best Fandom	BTS	Nominated	
Space Shower Music Awards	2021	Best International Artist	BTS	Won	
Space Shower Music Awards	2021	People's Choice	BTS	Won	
Space Shower Music Awards	2022	Best International Artist	BTS	Won	
Spotify Awards (Note: The Spotify Awards were announced in November 2019 with its inaugural show held in March 2020 in Mexico City, Spotify's biggest single market. Nominees and winners across more than 50 categories, including Artist of the Year and Emerging Artist, are based on sales, streaming and user-engagement data.)	2020	Most Listened K-pop Artist (Male)	BTS	Won	
SPOTV K-Pop Awards	2026	Best Album of the Year (Daesang)	Arirang	Won	
SPOTV K-Pop Awards	2026	Artist of the Year (Bonsang)	BTS	Won	
Swiss Music Awards	2021	Best Group International	BTS	Nominated	
Teen Choice Awards	2017	Choice International Artist	BTS	Won	
Teen Choice Awards	2018	Choice Fandom	BTS	Won	
Teen Choice Awards	2018	Choice International Artist	BTS	Won	
Teen Choice Awards	2019	Choice Collaboration	"Boy with Luv"	Won	
Teen Choice Awards	2019	Choice Fandom	BTS	Won	
Teen Choice Awards	2019	Choice International Artist	BTS	Won	
Teen Choice Awards	2019	Choice Summer Tour	Love Yourself: Speak Yourself World Tour	Won	
Telehit Awards	2019	Best K-pop of the Year	BTS	Won	
Telehit Awards	2019	Best Video of the Public	"Boy with Luv"	Nominated	
Ticketmaster Awards	2018	Global Ticket of the Year	Love Yourself World Tour	Won	
Ticketmaster Awards	2018	French Ticket of the Year	Love Yourself World Tour	Won	
Ticketmaster Awards	2018	Most Anticipated Event of the Year for 2019 (France)	BTS	Nominated	
Ticketmaster Awards	2019	Global Ticket of the year	Love Yourself World Tour	Nominated	
Ticketmaster Awards	2019	UK Ticket of the Year	Love Yourself World Tour	Nominated	
Ticketmaster Awards	2019	French Ticket of the Year	Love Yourself World Tour	Won	
Ticketmaster Awards	2019	Most Anticipated Event of the Year for 2020 (France)	BTS	Won	
Ticketmaster Awards	2019	Most Anticipated International Band for 2020 (Spain)	BTS	Won	
Ticketmaster Awards	2019	Touring Milestone Award	Love Yourself: Speak Yourself World Tour	Won	
Tokopedia WIB Indonesia K-Pop Awards	2021	Ter-Inspiring (Most Inspiring)	BTS	Won	
Tokopedia WIB Indonesia K-Pop Awards	2021	Selalu Ada, Selalu Bisa (Always There, Always Able)	BTS	Won	
Top Hit Music Awards	2021	Best International Band	BTS	Won	
UK Music Video Awards	2020	Best Pop Video – International	"On"	Nominated	
UNICEF Inspire Awards	2020	Integrated Campaigns and Events	Love Myself campaign	Won	
Variety's Hitmakers	2019	Group of the Year	BTS	Won	
Variety's Hitmakers	2021	Record of the Year	"Butter"	Won	
V Chart Awards	2014	Rookie Award	BTS	Won	
V Chart Awards	2017	Best Stage Performance	BTS	Won	
V Live Awards	2017	Global Artist Top 10	BTS	Won	
V Live Awards	2018	Global Artist Top 10	BTS	Won	
V Live Awards	2018	The Most Hearted Star of Vietnam	BTS	Won	
V Live Awards	2019	Best Artist	BTS	Won	
V Live Awards	2019	Best Channel	BTS	Won	
V Live Awards	2019	Best V Original	Run BTS!	Won	
V Live Awards	2019	Video of the Year	BTS	Won	
V Live Awards	2019	Global Artist Top 12	BTS	Won	
V Live Awards	2019	The Most Loved Artist	BTS	Won	
Webby Awards	2021	Variety & Reality: General Video	"BTS Carpool karaoke" ("The Late Late Show with James Corden")	Won	
Webby Awards	2021	music: general virtue & remote	"Map of the Soul ON:E"	Won	
Webby Awards	2021	music: general virtue & remote (Webby People's Voice)	"Map of the Soul ON:E"	Won	
Webby Awards	2021	Events & Live Streams: General Video	"Dear Class of 2020"	Won	
Webby Awards	2023	Social – Features: Best Community Engagement	"My BTS Story" ("YouTube Shorts")	Won	
Webby Awards	2023	Social – Features: Best Community Engagement(Webby People's Voice)	"My BTS Story" ("YouTube Shorts")	Won	
The WSJ Innovator Awards	2020	Music Innovator	BTS	Won	

== Other accolades ==
=== State and cultural honors ===
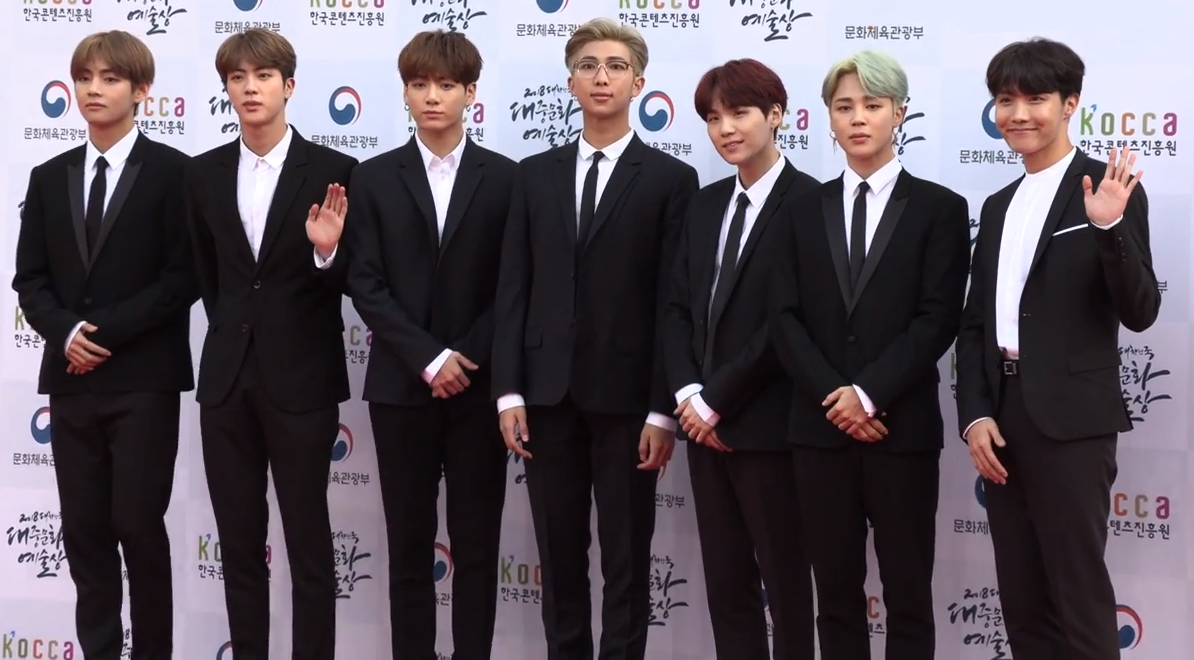
BTS at the ninth Korean Popular Culture and Arts Awards, where they were awarded the Hwagwan Order of Cultural Merit. (October 24, 2018)

Key
‡	Indicates an honor BTS was considered for only

Name of country or organization, year given, and name of honor
Country or organization	Year	Honor	Ref.
South Korea	2016	Minister of Culture, Sports and Tourism Commendation (Note: Honors are given at the Korean Popular Culture and Arts Awards, arranged by the Korea Creative Content Agency and hosted by the Ministry of Culture, Sports and Tourism. They are awarded to those who have contributed to the arts and South Korea's pop culture.)	
South Korea	2017	‡ Presidential Commendation	
South Korea	2018	Hwagwan Order of Cultural Merit (5th class)	
South Korea	2021	Special Presidential Envoy for Future Generations and Culture	
Asia Society	2020	Game Changer Award	
The Korea Society	2020	James A. Van Fleet Award	
Korea Good Donation Awards (Note: hosted by the Ministry of the Interior and Safety since 2021 in recognition of "individuals and groups who have inspired society through acts of kindness and giving, with the goal of spreading a mature culture of philanthropy in South Korea")	2025	Presidential Commendation	
Arirang TV 30th Anniversary Awards	2026	Lifetime Achievement Award	
El Paso County Commissioners Court	2026	Estimado Amigo Award	
Mexico	2026	Commemorative Plaque	

=== Listicles ===
Name of publisher, year listed, name of listicle, and placement
Publisher	Year	Listicle	Placement	Ref.
Billboard	2019	Top Touring Artists of the 2010s	45th	
Billboard	2019	Top Social 50 Artists of the 2010s	4th	
Billboard	2020	100 Greatest Music Video Artists of All Time	74th	
Billboard	2020	The 64 Most Memorable Moments of All Time from the Billboard Music Awards	placed (Note: shared with Halsey)	
Billboard	2020	The 64 Most Memorable Moments of All Time from the Billboard Music Awards	placed	
Billboard	2021	The Greatest Pop Star By Year: 1981–2020	2020	
Billboard	2021	2020 Global Money Makers: The 5 Top Highest Paid Musicians	4th	
Billboard	2021	Greatest Pop Stars of 2021	6th	
Billboard	2022	Global Money Makers: Highest Paid Musicians (2021)	4th	
Billboard	2022	Best Grammy Performances of 2022 ("Butter")	1st	
Billboard	2022	The 25 Musical Moments That Defined the First Quarter of the 2020s	placed	
Billboard	2024	Greatest Pop Stars of the 21st Century	19th	
Billboard	2024	Greatest Pop Star of 2020	1st	
Billboard	2026	Greatest Grammy Moments of All Time from Every Grammys Ceremony	2022	
Billboard	2026	The 25 Best VMAs Performances of All Time ("Dynamite")	21st	
Billboard	2026	Best 2026 AMAS Performances('Hooligan')	2nd (Note: The performance of "Hooligan" was prerecorded off-site at Las Vegas' Allegiant Stadium during their Arirang World Tour. The group later attended the rest of the ceremony in person at the MGM Grand Garden Arena.)	
Bloomberg	2018	The Bloomberg 50	Placed	
Bloomberg	2020	Pop Star Power Ranking	10th	
Bloomberg	2020	Pop Star Power Ranking	2nd	
Bloomberg	2021	Pop Star Power Ranking	2nd	
Bloomberg	2021	Pop Star Power Ranking	2nd	
Business of Fashion	2023	BoF 500 (Note: The BoF 500 is an annual fashion industry power list of figures leading the global fashion industry.)	Placed	
Bustle	2021	These 10 GOATS Are Paving The Way In Their Respective Fields	3rd	
CNN	2019	The 10 Artists Who Transformed Music in the 2010s	Placed	
Consequence of Sound	2020	Band of the Year	Placed	
Cosmopolitan India	2023	7 Artists You Should See Live at Least Once in Your Life	placed	
Elle	2019	All the Best Looks From the 2019 Grammys	21st	
Entertainment Weekly	2024	"25 Best Boy Bands Ever!"	4th	
Esquire	2021	10 Best Pop Bands of All Time	Placed	
Forbes	2017	Korea Power Celebrity 40	5th	
Forbes	2018	30 Under 30 (Asia)	Placed	
Forbes	2018	Korea Power Celebrity	1st	
Forbes	2019	Celebrity 100	43rd	
Forbes	2019	Korea Power Celebrity	2nd	
Forbes	2020	100 Digital Stars (Asia)	Placed	
Forbes	2020	Celebrity 100	47th	
Forbes	2020	Korea Power Celebrity	1st	
Forbes	2021	Korea Power Celebrity	1st	
Forbes	2022	Korea Power Celebrity	1st	
Forbes	2023	Korea Power Celebrity	1st	
Forbes	2026	Korea Power Celebrity	1st	
Forbes Korea	2025	K-Idol of the Year 30	4th	
Forbes Middle East	2021	8 Highest-Paid Celebrities of 2021	placed	
Gold House	2019	A100 List (Note: The A100 List honors the most impactful Asians and Asian American & Pacific Islanders (AAPIs) in culture every May for AAPI Heritage Month. Gold House "champions trailblazing members of the AAPI community and their transformative contributions to entertainment, fashion, lifestyle, technology, business, social activism and politics from the past year.")	Placed	
Gold House	2020	A100 List	Placed	
Gold House	2021	A100 Hall of Fame	Inducted	
Golden Disc Awards	2025	Golden Disc Powerhouse 40	Placed	
GQ British	2020	The very best-dressed attendees at the Grammy Awards 2020	2nd	
Guinness World Records	2021	Guinness World Records 2022 Hall of Fame	Inducted	
Guinness World Records	2026	Guinness World Records ICONS (Pop Culture)	Inducted	
IZM	2025	The 25 Greatest Musicians of the first 25 Years of the 21st Century	Placed	
Korea Federation of Copyright Societies (Note: The Korea Federation of Copyright Societies is an association that consists of 10 organizations, including the Korea Music Copyright Association (KOMCA), the Korean Music Performers Association, the Korean Broadcasting Writers Association, and the Korea Press Foundation, and has a total of 300,000 members.)	2023	Korea World Music Culture Hall of Fame ("DNA")	Inducted	
Korea International Trade Association	2026	Top 10 Pioneers Who Achieved $1 Trillion in Exports	Placed	
Korea Newspaper Journalists Association	2026	K-Culture 100 Great Koreans	Inducted	
Luminate	2025	Most Streamed K-Pop Artist in US	10th	
Pollstar	2022	Top Touring Artists of the Pollstar Era (1980–2022)	98th	
Prestige	2022	25 biggest pop culture moments from the first quarter of the 21st century	20th	
Prestige	2024	Most successful boybands of all time (by decade)	2020s	
Rolling Stone	2021	2020 Most Tweeted-about musicians in the U.S.	1st	
Rolling Stone	2021	Top 10 Most Mentioned K-Pop artists in the world	1st	
Rolling Stone	2022	The 25 Most Stylish Musicians of 2022	4th	
Rolling Stone	2023	The 30 Greatest Grammy Performances of All Time(‘Butter’)	14th	
Sisa Journal (Note: The Sisa Journal is one of the major weekly news magazines in Korea. Established in 1989, its annually conducted 'Who Moves Korea' survey determines the most influential figures in the country and highlights next-generation leaders of Korea. The survey is conducted on a total of 1000 experts across 10 fields, including professors, journalists, politicians, businessmen, and cultural artists.)	2018	Most Influential People in Broadcasting and Entertainment	2nd	
Sisa Journal	2018	Person of the Year	Placed	
Sisa Journal	2018	Who Makes Korea Move	16th	
Sisa Journal	2019	Most Influential People in Broadcasting and Entertainment	1st	
Sisa Journal	2019	Who Makes Korea Move	8th	
Sisa Journal	2020	100 Next Generation Leaders – Culture and Arts	3rd	
Sisa Journal	2020	Who Makes Korea Move	9th	
Sisa Journal	2021	Who Makes Korea Move	5th	
Sisa Journal	2022	Who Makes Korea Move	4th	
Sisa Journal	2023	Who Makes Korea Move	7th	
Spotify	2026	Most-Streamed Artists of All Time on Spotify	12th	
Teen Vogue	2022	33 Best Boy Bands of All Time	1st	
Time	2017	25 Most Influential People on the Internet	Placed	
Time	2018	25 Most Influential People on the Internet	Placed	
Time	2018	Next Generation Leaders	Placed	
Time	2019	25 Most Influential People on the Internet	Placed	
Time	2019	Time 100	Placed	
Time	2020	Entertainer of the Year	Placed	
uDiscover Music	2025	18 Best Boy Bands	2nd	
United Nations	2019	Global Sustainable Future Leaders	1st	
United Nations	2020	Global Sustainable Future Leaders	1st	
United Nations	2021	Global Sustainable Future Leaders	1st	
Vogue	2018	The Most Tweeted-About Celebrities	1st	
Vogue	2018	The Most Tweeted-About Musicians	1st	
Vogue	2021	The Best Dressed Stars at the 2021 Grammy Awards	7th	
Vogue India	2025	21 K-pop Bands Breaking the Internet	1st	
Wired	2019	The 10 Best Artists of the 2010s	Placed	

=== World records ===
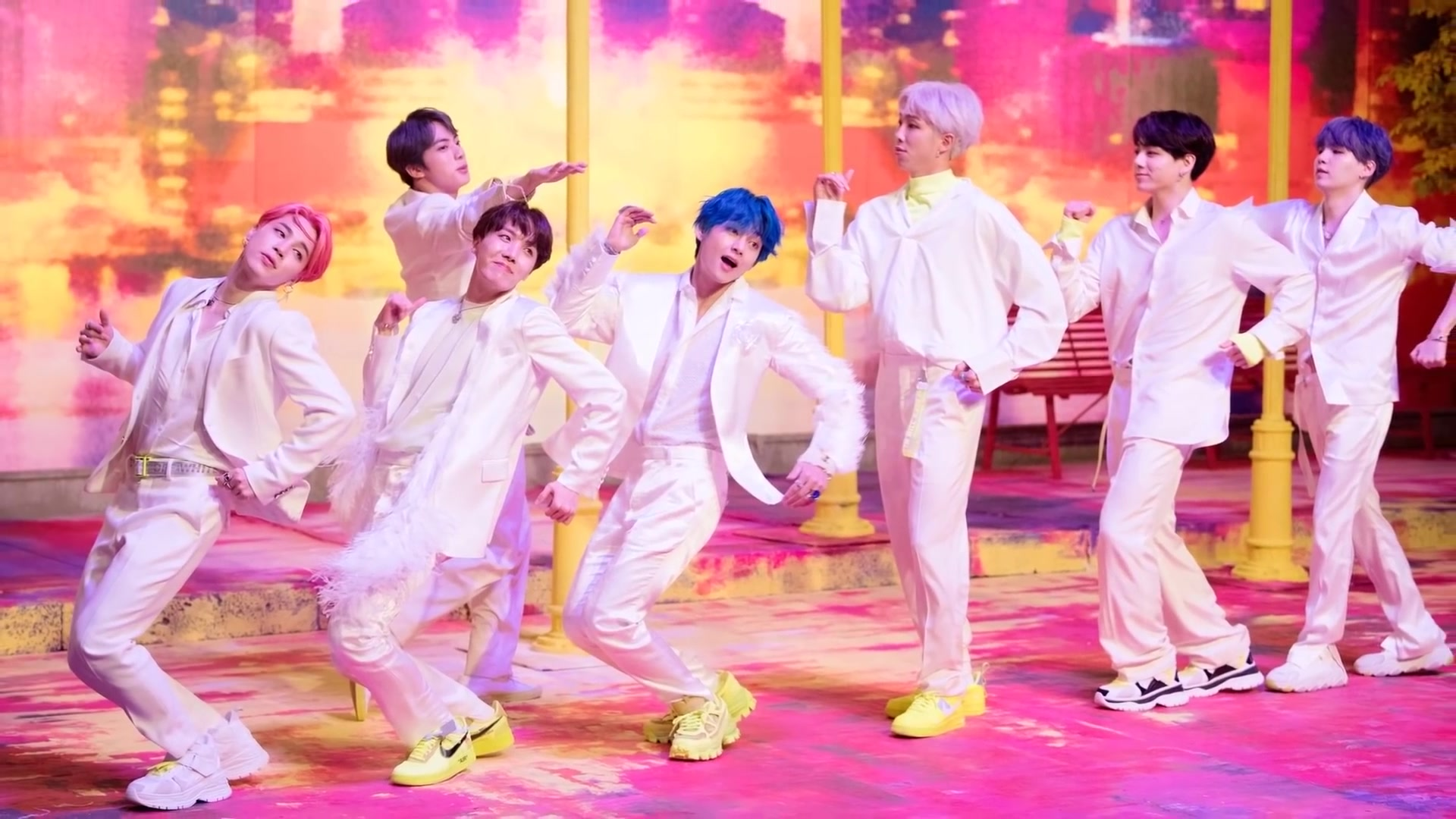
BTS filming the "Boy with Luv" music video on March 15, 2019. The track attained three Guinness World Records.

Key
†	Indicates a now former record holder (Note: This does not indicate that BTS lost the record, only that the listed record holder (i.e. a music video) was eventually surpassed. The list includes self-broken records.)

Name of publication, year the record was awarded, name of the record, and the name of the record holder
Publication	Year	World record	Record holder	Ref.
Guinness World Records	2017	Most viewed music video online in 24 hours by a K-pop group	† "DNA"	
Guinness World Records	2017	Most Twitter engagements (average retweets) overall	BTS	
Guinness World Records	2017	Most Twitter engagements (average retweets) for a music group	BTS	
Guinness World Records	2018	Most viewed YouTube music video in 24 hours	† "Idol"	
Guinness World Records	2018	First Korean act to reach No.1 on the Billboard 200 albums chart	BTS	
Guinness World Records	2018	First Korean act to reach No.1 on the Billboard Artist 100	BTS	
Guinness World Records	2018	First K-pop group to reach the Top 10 on the US singles chart	BTS	
Guinness World Records	2019	Most viewed YouTube music video in 24 hours by a K-pop group	† "Boy with Luv"	
Guinness World Records	2019	Most viewed YouTube music video in 24 hours	† "Boy with Luv"	
Guinness World Records	2019	Most viewed YouTube video in 24 hours	† "Boy with Luv"	
Guinness World Records	2019	Best-selling album in South Korea	† Map of the Soul: Persona	
Guinness World Records	2019	Fastest to reach one million followers on TikTok	BTS	
Guinness World Records	2020	Most weeks at No.1 on Billboard Social 50 chart	BTS	
Guinness World Records	2020	Best-selling album in South Korea	Map of the Soul: 7	
Guinness World Records	2020	Highest annual earnings for a K-Pop band (current year)	BTS	
Guinness World Records	2020	Most viewed YouTube music video in 24 hours by a K-pop group	† "Dynamite"	
Guinness World Records	2020	Most viewed YouTube music video in 24 hours	† "Dynamite"	
Guinness World Records	2020	Most viewed YouTube video in 24 hours	"Dynamite"	
Guinness World Records	2020	Most simultaneous viewers for a music video on YouTube Premieres	"Dynamite"	
Guinness World Records	2020	Most viewers for the premiere of a video on YouTube	† "Dynamite"	
Guinness World Records	2020	Most viewers for a music concert live stream on a bespoke platform (Note: Bang Bang Con:The Live concert broadcast on June 14, 2020.)	BTS	
Guinness World Records	2020	Most "daesang" ("grand prize") awards won at the Mnet Asian Music Awards	BTS	
Guinness World Records	2021	Most Nickelodeon Kids' Choice Awards won by a music group (Note: shared with Fifth Harmony)	† BTS	
Guinness World Records	2021	Most weeks on the US Hot 100 by a K-pop track	"Dynamite"	
Guinness World Records	2021	Most weeks at No.1 on Billboard's Digital Song Sales Chart	"Dynamite"	
Guinness World Records	2021	Most streamed act on Spotify (group)	† BTS	
Guinness World Records	2021	Most followers on Instagram for a music group	† BTS	
Guinness World Records	2021	Most viewers for the premiere of a video on YouTube	"Butter"	
Guinness World Records	2021	Most viewers for the premiere of a music video on YouTube	"Butter"	
Guinness World Records	2021	Most streamed track on Spotify in the first 24 hours	"Butter"	
Guinness World Records	2021	Most viewed YouTube music video in 24 hours	"Butter"	
Guinness World Records	2021	Most viewed YouTube music video in 24 hours by a K-pop group	"Butter"	
Guinness World Records	2021	Most Mnet Asian Music Awards won	BTS	
Guinness World Records	2022	Most followers on TikTok for a music group	† BTS	
Guinness World Records	2022	Most followers on Twitter for a music group	† BTS	
Guinness World Records	2022	Most Nickelodeon Kids' Choice Awards won by a music group	† BTS	
Guinness World Records	2022	Most followers on Spotify (group)	BTS	
Guinness World Records	2023	Most streamed male group on Spotify	BTS	
Guinness World Records	2023	Most Nickelodeon Kids' Choice Awards won by a music group	BTS	
Guinness World Records	2023	Most followers on Instagram for a music group	BTS	
Guinness World Records	2023	Most followers on Twitter for a music group	BTS	
Guinness World Records	2023	Most followers on TikTok for a music group	BTS	

== See also ==
- List of awards and nominations received by RM
- List of awards and nominations received by Jin
- List of awards and nominations received by Suga
- List of awards and nominations received by J-Hope
- List of awards and nominations received by Jimin
- List of awards and nominations received by V
- List of awards and nominations received by Jungkook
