= Proof (album) =

2022 compilation album by BTS

- Digital cover

Compilation album by BTS
- Released: June 10, 2022
- Recorded: 2013–2022
- Length: 168:34 (physical); 128:14 (digital); 70:20 (Disc 1); 53:29 (Disc 2); 42:33 (Disc 3, physical); 4:25 (Disc 3, digital)
- Languages: Korean; English
- Label: BigHit

BTS chronology
| BTS, the Best (2021) | Proof (2022) | Permission to Dance on Stage – Live (2025) |

Singles from Proof
- 1. "Yet to Come (The Most Beautiful Moment)" Released: June 10, 2022

Proof is the first anthology album released by South Korean group BTS, on June 10, 2022, through BigHit Music. The 3-disc project comprises several of the band's singles through the years; a selection of discography "favorites" chosen by the band members; and various demos and previously unreleased tracks. It also includes five new songs: the album's lead single "Yet to Come (The Most Beautiful Moment)", "Run BTS", "For Youth", "Quotation Mark", and "Young Love" (애매한 사이).

The album sold over 2 million copies worldwide on its opening day and topped the charts in 18 territories, including Australia, Germany, Japan, South Korea, the United Kingdom, and the United States. It has been certified gold in New Zealand, and Poland; platinum in France; double platinum in Japan; and 3× Million in South Korea.

== Background and release ==
"I feel thrilled every time we release new music for the first time. I hope many people will enjoy the album. Proof is a special album that closes the first chapter of BTS before going into our 10th year. We especially paid more attention to the lyrics as our message to our fans, ARMY who have been with us for nine years, is the key to this album."

— RM, Press release

On December 5, 2021, in conjunction with an announcement that BTS would be devoting more attention to solo projects, BigHit Music revealed that preparations for the release of an upcoming group album were underway. At the end of the band's final Permission to Dance on Stage concert at Allegiant Stadium on April 16, 2022, a video featuring excerpts of music videos from previous eras in the band's discography was played. The clip ended with the phrase "We are bulletproof" and the date "2022.06.10". The following day, BigHit confirmed the release of an unnamed album on June 10, with further details to be provided in the near future. The album's title, Proof, was revealed through a video trailer that premiered on YouTube on May 4. The preorder period began later that same day through Weverse Shop.

Per a subsequent notice posted on Weverse and shared via Twitter, the three-disc album comprises tracks spanning the past nine years of the band's discography, as well as three new songs. Two editions of the album, "Standard" and "Compact", were made available for purchase. The schedule for the album's rollout was published on May 5. The track listing for the album's first disc—it comprises 19 tracks—was released on May 9 (KST). The disc contains all of BTS' lead singles from "No More Dream" (2013) to "Butter" (2021), as well as the new single "Yet to Come (The Most Beautiful Moment)" which serves as the album's lead track. A remastered version of the band's 2013 song "Born Singer" is also included. Originally released for free by the band shortly after their debut, the song samples "Born Sinner" by American rapper J. Cole from his album of the same name. It has never before been included on any of the band's albums. "Yet to Come" and its accompanying music video were released alongside the album on June 10.

=== Format ===
Two editions of the album—Standard and Compact—were initially made available. Both versions include three CDS, photocards, and postcards. The Standard Edition comes with four booklets and a limited-edition poster while the Compact Edition includes a custom booklet, a mini poster and a "discography guide".

A limited collector's edition of Proof was announced through Weverse on August 28, 2022, with preorders opening that same day. Priced at ₩297,000, this version includes a 300-page photobook that features indepth interviews with the band about their discography, a 7-piece premium photo set, and several other collectibles not available with the Standard and Compact versions. BigHit stated that sales of the album would not count towards any charts. It was released on September 28.

== Promotion ==
From May 17 to May 23, 2022, Proof of Inspiration clips for each band member were released. These were followed by two sets of concept photos, called "Proof" and "Door", released from May 28 to 29 and May 31 to June 2. The images included light and dark photographs in front of a steel bank vault, as well as images with icy-blue lighting and variously colored lasers across the band members' faces. BTS made a total of four appearances on BigHit Music Record, a program on Melon Station devoted to BigHit Music, on May 20 and 27, June 3 and 10, and July 1 and 8. On May 26, Apple Music announced the launch of a new BTS show, BTS Radio: Past & Present, on Apple Music 1. The three-episode limited series aired from May 28 to June 10. The streaming service announced via Twitter on May 31 that the group broke the record for the year's biggest show with the first episode of #BTSRadio on Apple Music 1. The band members' statements, unique content, and a countdown to the album release were all featured on Spotify's #SpotifyPurpleU immersive microsite experience. Fans can also use the website to make custom #MyBTSProof share cards based on their favorite songs. From June 3, billboards with the hashtag #SpotifyPurpleU appeared worldwide, including in South Korea, the US, Brazil, Mexico, Japan, the Philippines, Indonesia, Thailand, and Vietnam.

Pop-up stores were launched in New York City and Los Angeles on June 10 in honor of the album's release. Goods limited to visitors only were sold at each location. BTS also launched the #MyBTStory Challenge on the same day, which is only available on YouTube Shorts. At the end of the month-long challenge, a tribute video honoring a few of the shorts produced by the fans using the album title track will be made available on BTS' official YouTube channel. Each week, BTS will release its own #MyBTStory Shorts featuring a different band member, starting with V on June 17. According to a Weverse announcement from BigHit Music, the group opened an exhibition titled "2022 BTS EXHIBITION : PROOF" on September 28 in Seoul and on October 5 in Busan based on their creative journey.

=== Live performances ===
BTS performed "Yet to Come" and "For Youth" on M Countdown, Music Bank, and Inkigayo. These appearances marked the band's first time performing on domestic music shows since promotions for their 2020 single "On". They performed the same songs, with the addition of "Born Singer", during Proof Live in celebration of their ninth anniversary on June 13, 2022. On October 8, 2022, they performed "Yet to Come" and "For Youth" at The Fact Music Awards. For the first time in six months, BTS performed at the "Yet To Come" concert on October 15 at the Busan Asiad Main Stadium in Busan as part of the city's quest to host the World Expo 2030, where they debuted the performance of "Run BTS"; the footage was uploaded to their YouTube channel post-concert.

== Music and lyrical content ==
"We carefully finalized the order of the tracks as the album speaks of BTS' history. My suggestion would be to listen to the album in the order. We are honored to capture our nine-year journey in this album. Listening to the album will trace you back in memory and the paths BTS have walked"

— Suga on how Proof was prepared, Press Release

Disc one opens with "Born Singer", a hip-hop and R&B track that samples American rapper J. Cole's "Born Sinner". The band reworked the original version to include their lyrics, ad-libs, and production. "Yet to Come (The Most Beautiful Moment)", the album's lead single, follows next. An alternative hip-hop track co-written by RM, J-Hope, Suga, longtime producer Pdogg, and American artists Max and Dan Gleyzer, the song's lyrics simultaneously reflect on the band's past while looking towards the future. It contains references to songs such as the band's own "Young Forever" (from 2016's The Most Beautiful Moment in Life: Young Forever) and Kanye West's "Touch the Sky". The production is laid-back, with striking background synths and old-school hip-hop beats from the early 2000s.

Run BTS
A 25-second sample of the chorus of "Run BTS", a hip-hop track featuring distorted electric guitar of hard rock and heavy bass.

Disc two comprises solo and sub-unit tracks, including the new song "Run BTS". A hip-hop/rock track, it features a "thrumming" repetitive guitar riff, and low-key growls of J-Hope, Suga, and RM are heard during the pre-chorus. The song highlights in particular Suga's complex rapping style while showcasing Jimin, V, Jungkook and Jin's expert vocal abilities, as the singers "deliver some of the most soaring falsettos". Lyrically, the band voice their support for each another and expound on their attitude towards outside influences throughout the three-and-a-half-minute-long track. The band's Korean name, Bangtan Sonyeondan, is referenced in lines where the members talk about the seven of them running "bulletproof".

The third disc is a mixture of 11 demos, two new songs—exclusive to the physical version of the album, and one previously shelved track. The first of the two new songs is the disc's second track, "Young Love", a collaborative traditional R&B song by RM and Jungkook. The other is track four, "Quotation Mark", by RM, J-Hope, and Jungkook, which has a retro beat similar in vigor to BTS' 2013 song "Like", from the 2 Cool 4 Skool single album. The lyrics feature numerous allusions to past songs by the band. J-Hope's stanza is a replica of his verse from "BTS Cypher: Pt.3-Killer" while other tunes evoke "Love Maze" and "Hold Me Tight". The album's final song, "For Youth", opens with an audio sample from the band's 2019 concert at Wembley Stadium in London, of 90,000 fans singing along to "Young Forever". The song includes a trap beat, rag piano played slowly, and the mellow sounds of a soul band. The lyrics frequently allude to "Spring Day", "Epilogue: Young Forever", "Friends", and various trials the band faced during the previous nine years.

== Critical reception ==
Professional ratings
Aggregate scores
| Source | Rating |
|---|---|
| Metacritic | 88/100 |
Review scores
| Source | Rating |
| AllMusic | 4.5/5 stars |
| Clash | 7/10 |
| Rolling Stone | 4/5 stars |
| The Star | 8/10 |

According to the review aggregator Metacritic, Proof received "universal acclaim" based on a weighted average score of 88 out of 100 from 5 critic scores. Natalie Morin of Rolling Stone praised the album, describing its lead single as "a classic BTS blend of sparkling pop and old-school hip-hop that offers a hopeful promise of an even brighter future." Esquire's Ammal Hassan said the album is "more than just a roundup of the best of BTS. Instead, it is a carefully curated story of the group's past and memories, much of which they reflect on in their new songs."

Choi Ji-won of The Korean Herald described the album as something that "offers a throwback to the past, an invitation to the future," and "evidence of BTS' unwavering pursuit of its dreams, which it promises to continue doing in the future." For Times, Elizabeth De Luna cited that Proof shows "an evolution from early raw material to a polished global presentation." In her review for Consequence, Mary Siroky explained how the band "unpack an unparalleled creative journey" through the 48 songs from different eras of their career.

== Commercial performance ==
On its release day alone, Proof sold over two million copies worldwide. By the end of its first week, it sold a total of 2,752,496 copies. The album debuted at number one in South Korea, Australia, Austria, Belgium, Canada, Finland, Germany, Japan, the Netherlands, New Zealand, Poland, Portugal, and Switzerland. It also reached the top ten in Italy, Lithuania, and Norway. It peaked at number eight in the United Kingdom, becoming the group's fifth top-10 album. The album debuted at number three and peaked at number one on Greece's Albums Chart, giving BTS their first number one in the country.

Proof sold 514,000 copies in Japan during the period dated June 13–19, recording the highest first-week sales on the weekly Oricon Albums Chart in 2022 and achieving the fifth-highest first-week sales of all-time in Oricon chart history, after Mariah Carey's #1's (1998), Boa's Valenti (2003), and BTS' own BTS, the Best (2021) and Map of the Soul: 7 – The Journey (2020). The album is the band's tenth to debut at number one in Japan, extending their record as the foreign artist with the most number-one albums in Oricon chart history.

In the United States, Proof became BTS' sixth consecutive number-one on the Billboard 200. It debuted atop the chart with 314,000 album-equivalent units, including 266,000 pure sales; 36,000 stream-equivalent units (52.84 million on-demand official streams); and 12,000 track-equivalent units. It earned the most significant opening week for a group and the second-largest for an album released in the country in 2022 at the time, both in units accumulated and traditional album sales—Beyoncé's Renaissance eventually claimed the second-largest opening week record with 332,000 overall units in August. Proof also topped Billboard's Top Album Sales, Top Current Album Sales, Tastemaker Albums, and World Albums charts. "Yet To Come" debuted at number 13 on the Billboard Hot 100 while "Run BTS" peaked at number 73. BTS received a total of 25 chart placements as a result. The album sold a further 75,000 equivalent units in its second week. Per Luminate Data's year-end report, Proof sold 422,000 physical and digital copies combined in the US, making it the best-selling group album of 2022 and the third best-selling album overall in the country. It was also the second best-selling release on CD format, with 413,000 copies sold.

According to the International Federation of the Phonographic Industry (IFPI)'s Global Music Report for 2022, Proof was the second best-selling physical album worldwide; the fourth most-consumed album across all formats; and the highest-ranked album by a K-pop artist (of nine to make the list) on its Global Albums chart. (Note: The IFPI Global Albums chart ranks, in order, the albums that generated the most money globally across streaming, download, and physical record sales (combined) in a calendar year.)

== Accolades ==
Awards and nominations
| Organization | Year | Award | Result | Ref. |
|---|---|---|---|---|
| Asian Pop Music Awards | 2022 | Top 20 Album of the Year | Won | |
| Asian Pop Music Awards | 2022 | Album of the Year(Overseas) | Nominated | |
| MBC Plus X Genie Music Awards | 2022 | Album of the Year | Nominated | |
| Melon Music Awards | 2022 | Record of the Year | Won | |
| MAMA Awards | 2022 | Album of the Year | Won | |
| Golden Disc Awards | 2023 | Album Bonsang | Won | |
| Golden Disc Awards | 2023 | Album Daesang | Won | |
| Circle Chart Music Awards | 2023 | Album of the Year – 3rd Quarter | Won | , |
| Circle Chart Music Awards | 2023 | Retail Album of the Year | Won | , |
| Japan Gold Disc Awards | 2023 | Best 3 Albums (Asia) | Won | |
| Seoul Music Awards | 2023 | Best Album | Won | |

== Track listing ==
The digital version of the album only includes "For Youth" from Disc 3.

Disc 1
| No. | Title | Writer(s) | Producer(s) | Length |
|---|---|---|---|---|
| 1. | "Born Singer" | Jermaine Cole; James Fauntleroy II; Anthony Parrino; Canei Finch; Juro "Mez" Davis; Ibrahim Hamad; RM; Suga; J-Hope | | 3:59 |
| 2. | "No More Dream" (from 2 Cool 4 Skool, 2013) | Pdogg; "Hitman" Bang; RM; Suga; J-Hope; Supreme Boi; Jungkook | Pdogg | 3:42 |
| 3. | "N.O" (from O!RUL8,2?, 2013) | Pdogg; "Hitman" Bang; RM; Suga | Pdogg | 3:30 |
| 4. | "Boy in Luv" (상남자; from Skool Luv Affair, 2014) | Pdogg; "Hitman" Bang; RM; Suga; Supreme Boi | Pdogg | 3:50 |
| 5. | "Danger" (from Dark & Wild, 2014) | Pdogg; Thanh Bui; "Hitman" Bang; RM; Suga; J-Hope | Pdogg | 4:05 |
| 6. | "I Need U" (from The Most Beautiful Moment in Life, Pt. 1, 2015) | Pdogg; "Hitman" Bang; RM; Suga; J-Hope; Brother Su | Pdogg | 3:31 |
| 7. | "Run" (from The Most Beautiful Moment in Life, Pt. 2, 2015) | Pdogg; "Hitman" Bang; RM; Suga; V; Jungkook; J-Hope | Pdogg | 3:57 |
| 8. | "Fire" (불타오르네; from The Most Beautiful Moment in Life: Young Forever, 2016) | Pdogg; "Hitman" Bang; RM; Suga; J-Hope; Devine Channel | Pdogg | 3:23 |
| 9. | "Blood Sweat & Tears" (피 땀 눈물; from Wings, 2016) | Pdogg; RM; Suga; J-Hope; "Hitman" Bang; Kim Do-hoon | Pdogg | 3:37 |
| 10. | "Spring Day" (봄날; from You Never Walk Alone, 2017) | Pdogg; RM; Adora; "Hitman" Bang; Arlissa Ruppert; Peter Ibsen; Suga | Pdogg | 4:34 |
| 11. | "DNA" (from Love Yourself: Her, 2017) | Pdogg; "Hitman" Bang; Kass; Supreme Boi; Suga; RM | Pdogg | 3:43 |
| 12. | "Fake Love" (from Love Yourself: Tear, 2018) | Pdogg; "Hitman" Bang; RM | Pdogg | 4:02 |
| 13. | "Idol" (from Love Yourself: Answer, 2018) | Pdogg; Supreme Boi; "Hitman" Bang; Ali Tamposi; Roman Campolo; RM | Pdogg | 3:43 |
| 14. | "Boy with Luv" (작은 것들을 위한 시; featuring Halsey; from Map of the Soul: Persona, 2019) | Pdogg; RM; Melanie Joy Fontana; Michel "Lindgren" Schulz; "Hitman" Bang; Suga; Emily Weisband; J-Hope; Halsey | Pdogg | 3:49 |
| 15. | "On" (from Map of the Soul: 7, 2020) | Pdogg; RM; August Rigo; Fontana; Schulz; Suga; J-Hope; Antonina Armato; Krysta Youngs; Julia Ross | Pdogg | 4:06 |
| 16. | "Dynamite" (from Be, 2020) | David Stewart; Jessica Agombar | Stewart | 3:19 |
| 17. | "Life Goes On" (from Be, 2020) | Pdogg; RM; Ruuth; Chris James; Armato; Suga; J-Hope | Pdogg | 3:27 |
| 18. | "Butter" (non-album single, 2021) | Jenna Andrews; Rob Grimaldi; Stephen Kirk; RM; Alex Bilowitz; Sebastian Garcia; Ron Perry | Grimaldi; Kirk; Perry | 2:44 |
| 19. | "Yet to Come (The Most Beautiful Moment)" | Pdogg; RM; Max; Dan Gleyzer; Suga; J-Hope | Pdogg | 3:19 |
| Total length: | | | | 70:20 |

Disc 2
| No. | Title | Writer(s) | Producer(s) | Length |
|---|---|---|---|---|
| 1. | "Run BTS" (달려라 방탄) | Dwayne Abernathy Jr.; RM; Ebenezer; J-Hope; Ghstloop; Jungkook; Suga; Oneye (Pontus Kalm); Daniel Caesar; Ludwig Lindell; Fontana; Schulz; Feli Ferraro | Dem Jointz for U Made Us What We Are LLC; Ghstloop | 3:25 |
| 2. | "Intro: Persona" (solo by RM; from Map of the Soul: Persona, 2019) | Hiss Noise; RM; Pdogg | Hiss Noise | 2:54 |
| 3. | "Stay" (performed by RM, Jin and Jungkook; from Be, 2020) | Arston; Jungkook; RM; Jin | Arston | 3:25 |
| 4. | "Moon" (solo by Jin; from Map of the Soul: 7, 2020) | Slow Rabbit; RM; Jin; Adora; Jordan "DJ Swivel" Young; Candace Nicole Sosa; Caesar; Lindell | Slow Rabbit | 3:29 |
| 5. | "Jamais Vu" (performed by Jin, J-Hope and Jungkook; from Map of the Soul: Persona, 2019) | Marcus McCoan; Owen Roberts; Matty Thomson; Max Lynedoch Graham; Camilla Anne Stewart; RM; J-Hope; "Hitman" Bang | Arcades; Bad Milk; McCoan | 3:46 |
| 6. | "Trivia 轉: Seesaw" (solo by Suga; from Love Yourself: Answer, 2018) | Slow Rabbit; Suga | Slow Rabbit; Suga | 4:06 |
| 7. | "BTS Cypher Pt. 3: Killer" (featuring Supreme Boi; performed by RM, Suga and J-Hope; from Dark & Wild, 2014) | Supreme Boi; RM; Suga; J-Hope | Supreme Boi | 4:28 |
| 8. | "Outro: Ego" (solo by J-Hope; from Map of the Soul: 7, 2020) | J-Hope; Hiss Noise; Supreme Boi | Hiss Noise | 3:16 |
| 9. | "Her" (performed by RM, Suga and J-Hope; from Love Yourself: Answer, 2018) | Suga; Slow Rabbit; RM; J-Hope | Suga; Slow Rabbit | 3:49 |
| 10. | "Filter" (solo by Jimin; from Map of the Soul: 7, 2020) | Tom Wiklund; Hilda Stenmalm; "Hitman" Bang; Lee Seu-ran; Lutra; Danke; Bobby Chung; Ahn Bok-jin; Fallin' Dild; Neon Boy | Wiklund | 3:00 |
| 11. | "Friends" (친구; performed by Jimin and V; from Map of the Soul: 7, 2020) | Pdogg; Supreme Boi; Jimin; Adora; Martin Sjølie; Stella Jang | Pdogg; Jimin | 3:19 |
| 12. | "Singularity" (solo by V; from Love Yourself: Tear, 2018) | Charlie J. Perry; RM | Charlie | 3:17 |
| 13. | "00:00 (Zero O'Clock)" (performed by Jin, Jimin, V and Jungkook; from Map of the Soul: 7, 2020) | Pdogg; RM; Jessie Lauryn Foutz; Antonina Armato | Pdogg | 4:10 |
| 14. | "Euphoria" (solo by Jungkook; from Love Yourself: Answer, 2018) | Young; Sosa; Fontana; "Hitman" Bang; Supreme Boi; Adora; RM | Young | 3:49 |
| 15. | "Dimple" (보조개; performed by Jin, Jimin, V and Jungkook; from Love Yourself: Her, 2017) | Matthew Tishler; Allison Kaplan; RM | Tishler; Crash Cove | 3:16 |
| Total length: | | | | 53:29 |

Disc 3
| No. | Title | Writer(s) | Producer(s) | Length |
|---|---|---|---|---|
| 1. | "Jump" (demo version) | Suga; Pdogg; RM; Supreme Boi | Suga; Pdogg; Supreme Boi | 2:26 |
| 2. | "Young Love" (애매한 사이) | Pdogg; RM | Pdogg | 2:38 |
| 3. | "Boy in Luv" (demo version) | Pdogg; "Hitman" Bang; RM; Suga; Supreme Boi | Pdogg | 3:39 |
| 4. | "Quotation Mark" (따옴표) | Pdogg; RM; J-Hope | Pdogg | 2:59 |
| 5. | "I Need U" (demo version) | Pdogg; "Hitman" Bang; RM; Suga; Brother Su; J-Hope | Pdogg | 2:42 |
| 6. | "Boyz with Fun" (흥탄소년단; demo version) | Suga; Pdogg; "Hitman" Bang; RM; J-Hope; Jin; Jimin; V | Suga; Pdogg | 4:08 |
| 7. | "Tony Montana" (performed by Agust D with Jimin) | Agust D; Supreme Boi | Agust D; Pdogg; Supreme Boi | 3:20 |
| 8. | "Young Forever" (RM demo version) | RM; Slow Rabbit; Pdogg | RM; Slow Rabbit; Pdogg | 2:17 |
| 9. | "Spring Day" (V demo version) | Pdogg; V; RM; "Hitman" Bang; Adora | Pdogg | 2:13 |
| 10. | "DNA" (J-Hope demo version) | Pdogg; J-Hope | Pdogg | 1:51 |
| 11. | "Epiphany" (Jin demo version; performed by Jin) | Slow Rabbit; Adora; Jin | Slow Rabbit | 3:46 |
| 12. | "Seesaw" (demo version) | Suga | Suga | 3:09 |
| 13. | "Still with You" (a cappella; performed by Jungkook) | Jungkook | Jungkook | 4:00 |
| 14. | "For Youth" | RM; Imad Royal; Rogét Chahayed; Blaise Railey; Drew Love; 4rest; J-Hope; Suga; Hiss Noise; Slow Rabbit; "Hitman" Bang | Chahayed; Royal | 4:25 |
| Total length: | | | | 42:33 |

Notes

- "Born Singer" samples "Born Sinner" by J. Cole from his 2013 album of the same name.

== Charts ==
=== Weekly charts ===
Weekly chart performance
| Chart (2022) | Peak position |
|---|---|
| Australian Albums (ARIA) | 1 |
| Austrian Albums (Ö3 Austria) | 1 |
| Belgian Albums (Ultratop Flanders) | 1 |
| Belgian Albums (Ultratop Wallonia) | 1 |
| Canadian Albums (Billboard) | 1 |
| Croatian International Albums (HDU) | 1 |
| Czech Albums (ČNS IFPI) | 83 |
| Danish Albums (Hitlisten) | 2 |
| Dutch Albums (Album Top 100) | 1 |
| Finnish Albums (Suomen virallinen lista) | 1 |
| French Albums (SNEP) | 2 |
| German Albums (Offizielle Top 100) | 1 |
| Greek Albums (IFPI) | 1 |
| Hungarian Albums (MAHASZ) | 1 |
| Irish Albums (Official Charts) | 28 |
| Italian Albums (FIMI) | 2 |
| Japanese Albums (Oricon) | 1 |
| Japanese Hot Albums (Billboard Japan) | 1 |
| Lithuanian Albums (AGATA) | 5 |
| New Zealand Albums (RMNZ) | 1 |
| Norwegian Albums (VG-lista) | 9 |
| Polish Albums (ZPAV) | 1 |
| Portuguese Albums (AFP) | 1 |
| South Korean Albums (Gaon) | 1 |
| Spanish Albums (Promusicae) | 2 |
| Swedish Albums (Sverigetopplistan) | 15 |
| Swiss Albums (Schweizer Hitparade) | 1 |
| UK Albums (Official Charts) | 8 |
| Uruguayan Albums (CUD) | 3 |
| US Billboard 200 | 1 |
| US World Albums (Billboard) | 1 |

=== Monthly charts ===
Monthly chart performance
| Chart (2022) | Peak position |
|---|---|
| Japanese Albums (Oricon) | 1 |
| South Korean Albums (Circle) | 1 |

=== Year-end charts ===
Year-end chart performance
| Chart (2022) | Position |
|---|---|
| Australian Albums (ARIA) | 61 |
| Austrian Albums (Ö3 Austria) | 46 |
| Belgian Albums (Ultratop Flanders) | 50 |
| Belgian Albums (Ultratop Wallonia) | 47 |
| French Albums (SNEP) | 41 |
| German Albums (Offizielle Top 100) | 15 |
| Japanese Albums (Oricon) | 4 |
| Japanese Digital Albums (Oricon) | 7 |
| Japanese Hot Albums (Billboard Japan) | 6 |
| New Zealand Albums (RMNZ) | 40 |
| Polish Albums (ZPAV) | 20 |
| Portuguese Albums (AFP) | 4 |
| South Korean Albums (Circle) | 1 |
| Spanish Albums (PROMUSICAE) | 73 |
| Swiss Albums (Schweizer Hitparade) | 27 |
| US Billboard 200 | 56 |
| US World Albums (Billboard) | 1 |

Year-end chart performance
| Chart (2023) | Position |
|---|---|
| French Albums (SNEP) | 149 |
| US World Albums (Billboard) | 7 |

Year-end chart performance
| Chart (2024) | Position |
|---|---|
| US World Albums (Billboard) | 12 |

Year-end chart performance
| Chart (2025) | Position |
|---|---|
| US World Albums (Billboard) | 10 |

== Certifications ==
Certifications and sales
| Region | Certification | Certified units/sales |
|---|---|---|
| Canada (Music Canada) | 4× Platinum | 320,000^{‡} |
| France (SNEP) | Platinum | 100,000^{‡} |
| Italy (FIMI) | Gold | 25,000^{‡} |
| Japan (RIAJ) | 2× Platinum | 622,395 |
| New Zealand (RMNZ) | 2× Platinum | 30,000^{‡} |
| Poland (ZPAV) | Gold | 10,000^{‡} |
| South Korea (KMCA) | 3× Million | 3,000,000^{^} |
| United Kingdom (BPI) | Gold | 100,000^{‡} |
^{^} Shipments figures based on certification alone.^{‡} Sales+streaming figures based on certification alone.

== Release history ==
Release formats for Proof
| Region | Date | Format | Version | Label | Ref. |
|---|---|---|---|---|---|
| Various | June 10, 2022 | Digital download; streaming | Digital | BigHit Music | |
| Various | June 10, 2022 | CD | Standard; Compact | BigHit Music | |
| South Korea | June 10, 2022 | CD | Standard; Compact | BigHit Music | |
| Costa Rica | June 10, 2022 | CD | Standard; Compact | BigHit; UMG | |
| Philippines | June 10, 2022 | CD | Standard; Compact | BigHit; UMG | |
| United States | June 10, 2022 | CD | Standard; Compact | BigHit; UMG | |
| Japan | June 13, 2022 | CD | Standard; Compact | Virgin; Universal Music Japan | |
| Various | September 28, 2022 | CD | Collector's Edition | BigHit; UMG | |
| United States | October 6, 2022 | CD | Collector's Edition | BigHit; UMG | |
| Japan | October 14, 2022 | CD | Collector's Edition | Virgin; Universal Music Japan | |
