= Yet to Come (The Most Beautiful Moment) =

2022 single by BTS

Single by BTS

from the album Proof
- Language: Korean; English
- Released: June 10, 2022
- Genre: Alternative hip hop
- Length: 3:19
- Label: BigHit
- Songwriters: Dan Gleyzer; J-Hope; Max; Pdogg; RM; Suga
- Producer: Pdogg

BTS singles chronology
"My Universe" (2021)	"Yet to Come (The Most Beautiful Moment)" (2022)	"Bad Decisions" (2022)

Alternative cover
- Hyundai ver. digital cover

Music videos
- "Yet to Come (The Most Beautiful Moment)" on YouTube '"Yet To Come (Hyundai Ver.)" on YouTube

"Yet to Come (The Most Beautiful Moment)" is a song by South Korean boy band BTS, released on June 10, 2022, through BigHit Music and Universal Music Group, as the lead single from their first anthology album Proof. It is the band's first original Korean-language single since 2020's "Life Goes On". An alternative hip hop track, the song's lyrics are a reflection on the past nine years of the band's career while also looking forward to what the future holds. It was written by Dan Gleyzer, J-Hope, Max, Pdogg, RM, and Suga, with Pdogg serving as producer. The song received generally positive reviews from critics.

"Yet to Come" reached number one in India, Japan, the Philippines and Vietnam. It charted in the top 10 in Hong Kong, Hungary, Indonesia, Malaysia, the Netherlands, Singapore and South Korea, and the top 20 in Australia, Canada, Lithuania, Peru, Sweden and the United States. BTS promoted the song in South Korea with performances on M Countdown, Music Bank and Inkigayo.

An accompanying music video, set in the desert, was released alongside the single. It contains numerous visual references to past music videos from different eras in BTS' career. An animated music video, featuring avatars of the band from their mobile game BTS Island: In the Seom, followed on June 20. In July, a tribute video featuring submissions from the band's fans was released as part of a promotional YouTube campaign.

== Background and release ==
I feel like we’ve done a great job getting where we are now, and I think our new song marks a comma, not a period in our career. I want its message to our fans to be that we are going to return with a more mature version of ourselves.

— Jimin talks about 'Yet to Come', BTS Radio: Past & Present

On May 6, 2022, the group announced the song and unveiled the artwork. The song title refers to "The Most Beautiful Moment in Life" series, also called the "HYYH" era. The era consisted of several short films, as well as a storyline realized through 20 interconnected music videos. The song was announced as one of three new tracks on the anthology album Proof. As a part of Hyundai's "Goal of the Century" marketing campaign for the 2022 FIFA World Cup, a British rock remix version of "Yet to Come" was produced in collaboration with the automobile company. On September 22, a minute-long preview of the music video for "Yet To Come (Hyundai Ver.)" was posted. The following day, the official music video was released.

== Composition ==
"Yet To Come (The Most Beautiful Moment)" was co-written by the group's rap line (RM, J-Hope, and Suga), their longtime producer Pdogg, and American artists Max and Dan Gleyzer. The song is in 4/4 common time in the key of D-flat major with a tempo of 86 beats per minute. BTS' vocal range span from A♭_{4} to B♭_{5}. References to songs like "Young Forever" and Kanye West's "Touch The Sky" are abundant, and the production is laid-back with striking background synths, and old-school hip hop beats from the early 2000s. Lyrically, the group reflects on their career of the previous nine years and looks forward to the future. The track finds the members weighing up "everything from the accolades that have been bestowed on them over the years, their purpose and their future." It was described as a "feel-good alternative hip-hop track with a medium tempo steering the melody ahead" that features a "chipmunk soul sampling style".

== Critical reception ==
Writing for NME, Rhian Daly awarded the song five out of five stars, praising the track for being "simultaneously tinged with nostalgia and brimming with optimism for the future". Daly pointed out V's and Suga's performance on the song. Billboard highlighted the "powerful chorus". Rolling Stone magazine described the single as "a classic BTS blend of sparkling pop and old-school hip-hop that offers a hopeful promise of an even brighter future." Abbie Aitken of Clash wrote that "Yet To Come" compels listeners to pay close attention to the members words and "emphasize nostalgia surrounding the group and their music."

Consequence included "Yet to Come" on its year-end list of the 'Top 50 Songs of 2022', at number 21, with Mary Siroky writing that the track served as "a loving ode to [the band's] past and a hopeful look towards the future", as its members are "more interested in the business of 'dreams and hope going forward,' a vision they're already making good on since the song's heartfelt release." Other publications who ranked it among the best songs of 2022 include South China Morning Post (14th), Teen Vogue, Esquire, and Tidal.

== Commercial performance ==
In South Korea, "Yet to Come" debuted at number 13 on the Week 24 issue of Gaon Digital Chart as the highest-charting new entry for the period dated June 5–11. The song also entered the Download and BGM Chart at number 2, and number 71 on the Streaming Chart. After that, the song peaked at number 4 on the digital chart and number 7 on the Streaming Chart. In Japan, the single debuted at number 1 on the Oricon Daily Digital Single Chart with 6,672 copies sold, and number 2 on the Weekly Digital Single chart for the period dated June 6–12, with 13,118 copies sold in total during that time. It debuted at number 5 on the Weekly Streaming Chart with 5,952,112 streams, and peaked at number 1 on its second week with 14,428,730 cumulative streams. The single debuted at number five on the Billboard Japan Hot 100 and at number three on the component Download Songs chart. The song rose to number 1 with 12,435,525 streams on the country's Hot 100 chart the following week. In the United States, the song debuted at number 13 on the Billboard Hot 100. It also topped the World Digital Song Sales. Globally, "Yet to Come” charted at No. 1 on the Billboard Global Excl. U.S. chart with 96.5 million streams and 42,000 sold in territories outside the U.S. on the June 10–16 tracking week. This marks the group's sixth appearance on the chart since the chart was created.

== Music video ==
=== Background ===
On June 8, 2022, BTS posted a teaser of the music video. The 35-second teaser shows the members in a desert, with each referencing one of the group's past music videos. The official four-minute music video was released on YouTube on June 10, 2022. On June 18, 2022, BTS shared behind-the-scenes footage of the members filming in a desert outside Las Vegas, where they were seen confronting several problems: the Day One shoot had to be cancelled due to a massive sandstorm.

An animated video of the single was released on June 20, 2022. It features the group’s avatars from the mobile game BTS Island: In the Seom. On July 12, 2022, BTS released a tribute video that included fan videos from their #MyBTStory YouTube campaign.

=== Synopsis ===
Jungkook is standing in front of an abandoned carousel, with the words “you never walk alone” written on it, referencing "Spring Day."

The video begins with Jungkook making a hand gesture as a reference to the band's Hwa Yang Yeon Hwa On Stage: Prologue video. The camera then zooms in through his fingers to reveal the seven band members seated in a barren desert, in the same order as seen in the 2014 "Just One Day" music video. Jin is seen in the truck he previously used in "Run"'s music video, facing the angel statue from "Blood Sweat & Tears." The old brown piano from Suga's "First Love" short film also makes an appearance. The blue container trailer that RM had passed in "Run" is now in front of him, and J-Hope is standing alongside the train from "Spring Day" on the dunes. BTS' first chapter ends where it began nine years ago, as the boys stand together in front of the bus. Where V covered Jin's eyes with his hands in the music video for "Blood Sweat & Tears," six years later, in "Yet to Come," Jin removes his hands to present to V the symbol of BTS' beginning — the yellow school bus from their very first music video, "No More Dream." They don dazzling white clothes that complement their happy looks instead of the dark and heavy makeup they wore nine years before. The septet is back on the bus, seated in the same configuration as in "Spring Day," and ready to head to their next destination, which has not yet been reached.

== Accolades ==
"Yet to Come" earned nine domestic television music show trophies in June, including a triple crown on M Countdown. The song also won the Melon Popularity Award for four consecutive weeks from June 20 to July 11, 2022. In November 2022, it became the first Korean-language song to be recognized by the Recording Academy when it earned a nomination for Best Music Video at the 65th Annual Grammy Awards.

Awards and nominations for "Yet to Come"
Award ceremony	Year	Category	Result	Ref.
Asian Pop Music Awards	2022	Song of the Year(Overseas)	Nominated	
Circle Chart Music Awards	2023	Global Digital Music – June	Won	
Grammy Awards	2023	Best Music Video	Nominated	
iHeartRadio Music Awards	2023	Best Music Video	Won	
Japan Gold Disc Awards	2023	Song of the Year by Download (Asia)	Won	
MAMA Awards	2022	Best Vocal Performance – Group	Nominated	
MAMA Awards	2022	Song of the Year	Nominated	
MTV Video Music Awards	2022	Best K-Pop	Nominated	
People's Choice Awards	2022	The Music Video of 2022	Nominated	

Music program awards
Program	Date	Ref.
Show Champion	June 15, 2022	
M Countdown	June 16, 2022	
M Countdown	June 23, 2022	
M Countdown	June 30, 2022	
Music Bank	June 17, 2022	
Music Bank	June 24, 2022	
Show! Music Core	June 25, 2022	
Inkigayo	June 19, 2022	
Inkigayo	June 26, 2022	

== Live performances ==
BTS performed "Yet to Come (The Most Beautiful Moment)", together with their B-side track "For Youth", on Mnet's M Countdown, KBS2's Music Bank, and SBS' Inkigayo. It was the first time since their 2020 single, "On", that the group performed on South Korean music shows. The group, accompanied by Anderson .Paak on drums, performed the single for their "Proof Live" in celebration of their 9th anniversary on June 13, 2022. On October 8, 2022, they performed "Yet to Come" and "For Youth" at The Fact Music Awards. BTS performed the single at the "Yet To Come" concert on October 15 in Busan.

== Track listing ==
- CD and digital single
1. "Yet to Come" – 3:13
- Digital (Hyundai Ver.)
1. "Yet to Come" (Hyundai Ver.) – 3:43

== Credits and personnel ==
Credits adapted from liner notes of Proof.

- BTS – primary vocals
- Dan Gleyzer – songwriting
- Heidi Wang - assistant mixing engineer
- J-Hope – songwriting, gang vocals
- Josh Gudwin - mixing engineer
- Jungkook – background vocals
- Max - songwriting
- Pdogg – production, songwriting, keyboard, synthesizer, vocal arrangement, rap arrangement, recording engineer, digital editing
- RM – songwriting, gang vocals
- Suga – songwriting, gang vocals

== Charts ==
=== Weekly charts ===
Chart performance for "Yet to Come (The Most Beautiful Moment)"
Chart (2022)	Peak position
Argentina Hot 100 (Billboard)	65
Australia (ARIA)	17
Bolivia (Billboard)	22
Canada Hot 100 (Billboard)	16
Finland Airplay (Radiosoittolista)	57
Germany (GfK)	63
Global 200 (Billboard)	2
Greece International (IFPI)	22
Hong Kong (Billboard)	7
Hungary (Single Top 40)	2
India International (IMI)	1
Indonesia (Billboard)	2
Ireland (IRMA)	34
Italy (FIMI)	98
Japan Hot 100 (Billboard)	1
Japan Combined Singles (Oricon)	2
Lithuania (AGATA)	20
Malaysia (Billboard)	2
Mexico Airplay (Billboard)	28
Netherlands (Single Tip)	8
New Zealand (Recorded Music NZ)	24
Peru (Billboard)	14
Philippines (Billboard)	1
Portugal (AFP)	40
Singapore (RIAS)	2
South Africa Streaming (TOSAC)	29
South Korea (Gaon)	4
South Korea (Billboard)	1
Sweden Heatseeker (Sverigetopplistan)	20
Switzerland (Schweizer Hitparade)	41
Taiwan (Billboard)	3
UK Singles (Official Charts)	27
US Billboard Hot 100	13
US World Digital Song Sales (Billboard)	1
Vietnam (Vietnam Hot 100)	1

=== Monthly charts ===
Monthly chart performance for "Yet to Come (The Most Beautiful Moment)"
Chart (2022)	Position
South Korea (Circle)	14

=== Year-end charts ===
Year-end chart performance for "Yet to Come (The Most Beautiful Moment)"
Chart (2022)	Position
Global Excl. US (Billboard)	187
Hungary (Single Top 40)	92
Japan Download Songs (Billboard Japan)	99
South Korea (Circle)	102
US Digital Song Sales (Billboard)	48
Vietnam (Vietnam Hot 100)	54

== Certifications ==
Certifications for "Yet to Come (The Most Beautiful Moment)"
Region	Certification	Certified units/sales
Canada (Music Canada)	Gold	40,000^{‡}
Streaming
Japan (RIAJ)	Platinum	100,000,000^{†}
^{‡} Sales+streaming figures based on certification alone.^{†} Streaming-only figures based on certification alone.

== Release history ==
Release dates and formats for "Yet to Come (The Most Beautiful Moment)"
Region	Date	Format	Version	Label	Ref.
Various	June 10, 2022	Digital download; streaming	Original	BigHit Music	
Italy	June 17, 2022	Contemporary hit radio	Original	Universal	
United States	June 17, 2022	CD single	Original	Universal	
Various	September 23, 2022	Digital download; streaming	Hyundai Version	BigHit	
