= BTS albums discography =

Recording collections by South Korean group

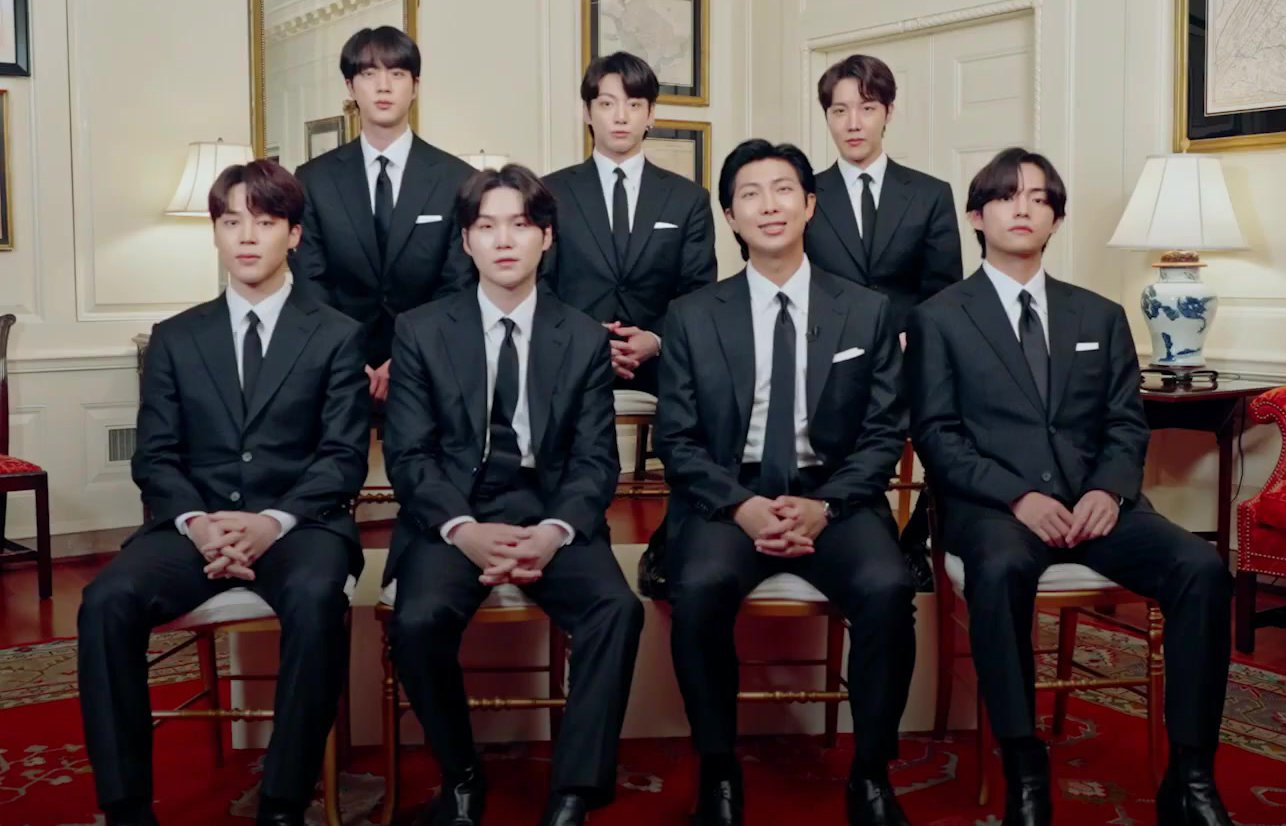
- BTS in May 2022; Left to right, from top to bottom: Jin, Jung Kook, J Hope, Jimin, Suga, RM, V
- Studio albums: 10
- EPs: 9
- Soundtrack albums: 1
- Live albums: 1
- Compilation albums: 8
- Reissues: 2
- Single albums: 2

South Korean hip hop boy group BTS has released ten studio albums (one of which was reissued under a different title), seven compilation albums, and six extended plays. In December 2018, BTS surpassed 10 million albums sold, setting the record for reaching that milestone in the shortest span of time (5 1/2 years) among all Korean acts to have debuted since 2000, with five million of those albums being sold in South Korea that year alone. By April 2020, the group had sold over 20 million physical albums in South Korea, becoming the best-selling Korean act of all time in less than seven years. As of May 2023, they have sold over 44 million albums domestically.

The group debuted in South Korea on June 13, 2013, with the single album 2 Cool 4 Skool. They made a comeback in September 2013 with an extended play, O!RUL8,2?. In February 2014, BTS released their second extended play, Skool Luv Affair. This marked the first time their album charted on the Billboard World Albums chart and Japan's Oricon Albums Chart. A repackaged version of the album, Skool Luv Affair Special Addition, was released in May. The group's first studio album, Dark & Wild, followed in August and became their first album to break into the US Top Heatseekers chart. To wrap up the year, BTS made their Japanese debut in December with their first Japanese-language studio album Wake Up. All of their Japanese singles—"No More Dream", released on June 4; "Boy in Luv", released on July 16; and "Danger", released on November 19—made it into the top 10 of the Oricon Albums Chart and the Japan Hot 100.

BTS' third and fourth extended plays, The Most Beautiful Moment in Life, Pt. 1 and The Most Beautiful Moment in Life, Pt. 2, were released in April and November 2015 respectively. The latter earned them their first entry on the Billboard 200 at number 171. The EP also topped the Billboard Top Heatseekers and World Albums charts for four weeks, the most by a South Korean act. The group's first compilation album, The Most Beautiful Moment in Life: Young Forever, was released in May 2016, followed by their second Japanese studio album, Youth, in September. Youth sold over 44,000 copies on its first day and became BTS' first studio album to top both the daily and weekly Oricon album charts. The group released their second studio album Wings, in October. It debuted at 26 on the Billboard 200, making it the highest-ranking Korean album in the chart's history at the time. Its reissue, You Never Walk Alone, was released in February 2017. Their fifth extended play, Love Yourself: Her, was released in September 2017. The EP opened at number seven on the US Billboard 200 with 31,000 album-equivalent units, making it the highest-charting K-pop album on the chart and biggest sales week of a K-pop album to date.

In April 2018, they released their third Japanese studio album, Face Yourself. It debuted at number 43 on the Billboard 200 with 12,000 album-equivalent units, making it the third-highest-charting Japanese album in the history of the chart. Just one month later, it became their first Japanese album to be certified Platinum by the RIAJ, having sold over 250,000 copies within that time. BTS's third Korean studio album, Love Yourself: Tear, was released on May 18, 2018, and debuted at number one on the Billboard 200, becoming the group's highest-charting album in a Western market, as well as the first K-pop album to top the US albums chart and the highest-charting album by an Asian act. BTS had the second-best total album sales in the US in 2018 behind Eminem, and accounted for 22.6% of the total albums sold in Korea that year. In 2019, the group scored their third number-one with Map of the Soul: Persona, their sixth extended play, on the Billboard 200, making them the first group since the Beatles in 1996 to have three number one albums in less than a year. The EP became the best-selling album in South Korean history, selling nearly 3.4 million copies in two months. They broke the all-time domestic sales record again with their fourth Korean studio album, Map of the Soul: 7, which sold 4.1 million copies in less than nine days since its release in early 2020 and gave BTS their fourth US number-one album.

== Studio albums ==
List of studio albums, with selected details and chart positions
Title	Album details	Peak chart positions										Sales	Certifications (Note: In April 2018, the Gaon Music Chart and the Korea Music Content Association introduced music recording certifications for albums, downloads and streaming numbers. Anything released prior to January 1, 2018 is unable to receive a certification.)
Title	Album details	KOR	AUS	BEL (FL)	CAN	JPN	NLD	NZ	SWE	UK	US	Sales	Certifications
Dark & Wild	Released: August 19, 2014; Label: Big Hit; Formats: CD, digital download, streaming	2	—	185	—	30	—	—	—	— (Note: Dark & Wild did not enter the UK Album Chart, but peaked at number 36 on the UK Independent Albums Chart.)	— (Note: Dark & Wild did not enter the Billboard 200, but peaked at number three on the World Albums chart.)	KOR: 606,261	
Wake Up	Released: December 24, 2014; Label: Big Hit; Formats: CD, CD+DVD, digital download, streaming	—	—	—	—	3	—	—	—	—	—	JPN: 28,000	
Youth	Released: September 7, 2016; Label: Big Hit; Formats: CD, CD+DVD, digital download, streaming	—	—	—	—	1	—	—	—	—	—	JPN: 94,293	RIAJ: Gold
Wings	Released: October 10, 2016; Label: Big Hit; Formats: CD, digital download, streaming	1	—	72	19	7	68	24	56	62	26	KOR: 1,528,355; JPN: 72,512; US: 13,000	BPI: Silver; MC: Platinum
Face Yourself	Released: April 4, 2018; Label: Big Hit; Formats: CD, CD+DVD, CD+Blu-ray, digital download, streaming	—	71	94	40	1	116	— (Note: Face Yourself did not enter the NZ Top 40 Albums Chart, but peaked at number seven on the NZ Heatseeker Albums Chart.)	—	78	43	JPN: 343,195; US: 4,000	BPI: Gold; MC: Platinum; RIAJ: 2× Platinum
Love Yourself: Tear	Released: May 18, 2018; Label: Big Hit; Formats: CD, digital download, streaming	1	6	6	2	3	6	5	6	8	1	KOR: 3,301,260; JPN: 209,598; US: 212,953	BPI: Gold; KMCA: 3× Million; MC: Platinum; RIAJ: Gold; RMNZ: Gold
Map of the Soul: 7	Released: February 21, 2020; Label: Big Hit; Formats: CD, digital download, streaming	1	1	1	1	1	1	1	3	1	1	KOR: 5,068,500; CAN: 31,000; FRA: 68,000; JPN: 500,206; UK: 32,000; US: 674,000	BEA: Gold; BPI: Gold; KMCA: 5× Million; MC: Platinum; RIAA: Platinum; RIAJ: Platinum; RMNZ: Platinum
Map of the Soul: 7 – The Journey	Released: July 15, 2020; Label: Big Hit; Formats: CD, CD+DVD, CD+Blu-ray, digital download, streaming	—	9	23	90	1	—	7	51	35	14	KOR: 184,881; JPN: 701,038; WW: 1,200,000	BPI: Gold; RIAJ: Million
Be	Released: November 20, 2020; Label: Big Hit; Formats: CD, digital download, streaming	1	2	3	1	1	2	1	3	2	1	KOR: 3,794,402; JPN: 582,132; US: 177,000	KMCA: 3× Million; MC: Platinum; RIAA: Platinum; RIAJ: Platinum; RMNZ: Gold
Arirang	Released: March 20, 2026; Label: Big Hit; Formats: CD, LP, digital download, streaming	1	1	1	1	1	1	1	2	1	1	KOR: 5,019,385; JPN: 558,572; US: 646,000	BPI: Silver; KMCA: 4× Million; MC: Platinum; RIAJ: 3× Platinum
"—" denotes releases that did not chart or were not released in that region.

== Reissues ==
List of reissues, with selected chart positions and sales
Title	Album details	Peak chart positions						Sales	Certifications
Title	Album details	KOR	CAN	JPN	NZ Heat.	US	US World	Sales	Certifications
Skool Luv Affair Special Addition	Released: May 14, 2014; Label: Big Hit; Formats: CD, digital download, streaming	1	—	3	—	—	—	KOR: 685,352; JPN: 40,829	
You Never Walk Alone	Released: February 13, 2017; Labels: Big Hit; Formats: CD, digital download, streaming	1	35	—	3	61	1	KOR: 1,473,954	BPI: Gold; MC: Platinum; RMNZ: Gold
"—" denotes releases that did not chart or were not released in that region.

== Compilation albums ==
List of compilation albums, with selected details, chart positions, sales, and certifications
Title	Album details	Peak chart positions										Sales	Certifications
Title	Album details	KOR	AUS	BEL (FL)	CAN	JPN	NLD	NZ	SWE	UK	US	Sales	Certifications
2 Cool 4 Skool / O!RUL8,2?	Released: April 23, 2014; Label: Big Hit; Format: CD+DVD	—	—	—	—	58	—	—	—	—	—		
The Most Beautiful Moment in Life: Young Forever	Released: May 2, 2016; Label: Big Hit; Formats: CD, digital download, streaming	1	—	194	99	7	—	—	—	— (Note: The Most Beautiful Moment in Life: Young Forever did not enter the UK Album Chart, but peaked at number 19 on the UK Independent Albums Chart.)	107	KOR: 1,138,820; JPN: 14,403; US: 6,000	BPI: Gold; MC: Platinum
The Best of BTS	Released: January 6, 2017; Label: Big Hit; Formats: CD, CD+DVD, streaming	—	—	—	—	5 (Note: The Korea Edition of The Best of BTS peaked at number 5, and the Japan Edition peaked at number 6)	—	—	—	—	—	JPN: 99,471 (Note: Sales of The Best of BTS: Korea Edition: 62,840; Japan Edition: 36,634)	RIAJ: Gold (Note: Certification for the Korea Edition); RIAJ: Gold (Note: Certification for the Japan Edition)
Love Yourself: Answer	Released: August 24, 2018; Label: Big Hit; Formats: CD, digital download, streaming	1	9	5	1	1	5	11	20	14	1	WW: 2,700,000; KOR: 3,413,500; JPN: 295,996; US: 199,865	KMCA: 3× Million; BPI: Gold; MC: Platinum; RIAA: Platinum; RIAJ: Gold; RMNZ: Platinum
BTS, the Best	Released: June 16, 2021; Label: Big Hit; Formats: 2CD, 2CD+2DVD, 2CD+Blu-Ray, digital download, streaming	—	31	8	45	1	—	30	—	71	19	WW: 1,520,000; JPN: 1,024,030; KOR: 1,188	BPI: Silver; RIAJ: Million
Proof	Released: June 10, 2022; Label: Big Hit; Formats: CD, digital download, streaming	1	1	1	1	1	1	1	15	8	1	KOR: 3,538,247; JPN: 622,395; US: 422,000	KMCA: 3× Million; BPI: Gold; RIAJ: 2× Platinum; MC: 4× Platinum; RMNZ: 2× Platinum
2025 BTS Festa: Capsule Album Vol.1 (Note: 2025 BTS Festa: Capsule Album Vol.1 was scheduled for a rolling release spanning two months. It was released in South Korea on June 27, 2025.) Track listing: 1. "Mikrokosmos" (소우주); 2. "On"; 3. "Dynamite"; 4. "Life Goes On"; 5. "Butter"; 6. "Permission to Dance"; 7. "Yet to Come (The Most Beautiful Moment)"; 8. "Arson" (방화, J-Hope song); 9. "Wild Flower" (들꽃놀이, RM song); 10. "Like Crazy" (Jimin song); 11. "Haegeum" (해금, Agust D song); 12. "Slow Dancing" (V song); 13. "Standing Next to You" (Jung Kook song); 14. "Running Wild" (Jin song)	Released: June 27, 2025; Label: Big Hit; Formats: NFC CD	3	—	—	—	—	—	—	—	—	—	KOR: 255,444	KMCA: Platinum
"—" denotes releases that did not chart or were not released in that region.

== Live albums ==
List of live albums, with selected details, chart positions, sales, and certifications
Title	Album details	Peak chart positions				Sales	Certifications
Title	Album details	KOR	JPN	JPN Hot	US	Sales	Certifications
Permission to Dance on Stage – Live	Released: July 18, 2025; Label: Big Hit; Formats: CD, digital download, streaming	2	5	14	10	KOR: 446,651; JPN: 23,347	KMCA: Platinum

== Soundtrack albums ==
Title	Album details	Peak chart positions										Sales	Certifications
Title	Album details	KOR	AUS	AUT	BEL (FL)	CAN	DEN	GER	JPN	SWI	US	Sales	Certifications
BTS World: Original Soundtrack	Released: June 28, 2019; Label: Big Hit; Formats: CD, digital download, streaming	1	55	16	19	58	37	7	4	6	26	KOR: 553,364; JPN: 57,665; US: 3,000	KMCA: 2× Platinum

== Extended plays ==
List of extended plays, with selected chart positions and sales
Title	EP details	Peak chart positions										Sales	Certifications
Title	EP details	KOR	AUS	BEL (FL)	CAN	JPN	NLD	NZ	SWE	UK	US	Sales	Certifications
O!RUL8,2?	Released: September 11, 2013; Label: Big Hit; Formats: CD, digital download, streaming	4	—	171	—	—	—	—	—	—	— (Note: O!RUL8,2? did not enter the Billboard 200, but peaked at number six on the World Albums chart.)	KOR: 503,736	
Skool Luv Affair	Released: February 12, 2014; Label: Big Hit; Formats: CD, digital download, streaming	1	23	82	—	32	—	—	—	— (Note: Skool Luv Affair did not enter the UK Album Chart, but peaked at number 22 on the UK Independent Albums Chart.)	12	KOR: 635,907	
The Most Beautiful Moment in Life, Pt. 1	Released: April 29, 2015; Label: Big Hit; Formats: CD, digital download, streaming	1	—	172	—	17	—	—	—	—	— (Note: The Most Beautiful Moment in Life, Pt. 1 did not enter the Billboard 200, but peaked at number two on the World Albums chart.)	KOR: 797,549; JPN: 13,091; US: 2,000	
The Most Beautiful Moment in Life, Pt. 2	Released: November 30, 2015; Label: Big Hit; Formats: CD, digital download, streaming	1	—	—	—	15	—	—	—	— (Note: The Most Beautiful Moment in Life, Pt. 2 did not enter the UK Album Chart, but peaked at number 40 on the UK Independent Albums Chart.)	171	KOR: 977,002; JPN: 14,051; US: 5,000	
Love Yourself: Her	Released: September 18, 2017; Label: Big Hit; Formats: CD, digital download, streaming	1	8	18	3	1	19	9	13	14	7	KOR: 3,153,946; JPN: 88,664; US: 36,000	BPI: Gold; RMNZ: Gold
Map of the Soul: Persona	Released: April 12, 2019; Label: Big Hit; Formats: CD, digital download, streaming	1	1	3	1	2	2	1	2	1	1	KOR: 4,666,656; JPN: 357,948; UK: 18,050; US: 454,000	KMCA: 4× Million; BEA: Gold; BPI: Gold; RIAA: Gold; RIAJ: Gold; RMNZ: Gold
Dynamite	Released: August 28, 2020; Label: Big Hit, Columbia; Formats: CD, digital download, streaming	Combined chart data with "Dynamite"											
Butter (Hotter, Sweeter, Cooler)	Released: June 4, 2021; Label: Big Hit, Columbia; Formats: digital download, streaming	Combined chart data with "Butter"											
"—" denotes releases that did not chart or were not released in that region.
Normal	Released: July 17, 2026; Label: Big Hit; Formats: CD, digital download, streaming												
"—" denotes releases that did not chart or were not released in that region.

== Single albums ==
List of single albums, with selected chart positions and sales
Title	Album details	Peak chart positions					Sales	Certifications
Title	Album details	KOR	BEL (FL)	FIN	JPN	US World	Sales	Certifications
2 Cool 4 Skool	Released: June 12, 2013; Label: Big Hit; Format: CD, digital download, streaming	5	174	—	—	12	KOR: 477,115	
Butter	Released: July 9, 2021; Label: Big Hit; Formats: CD, digital download, streaming	1	—	6	1	—	KOR: 3,197,001; JPN: 217,328	KMCA: 3× Million; RIAJ: Platinum
"—" denotes releases that did not chart or were not released in that region.
