= List of BTS live performances =

BTS live performances
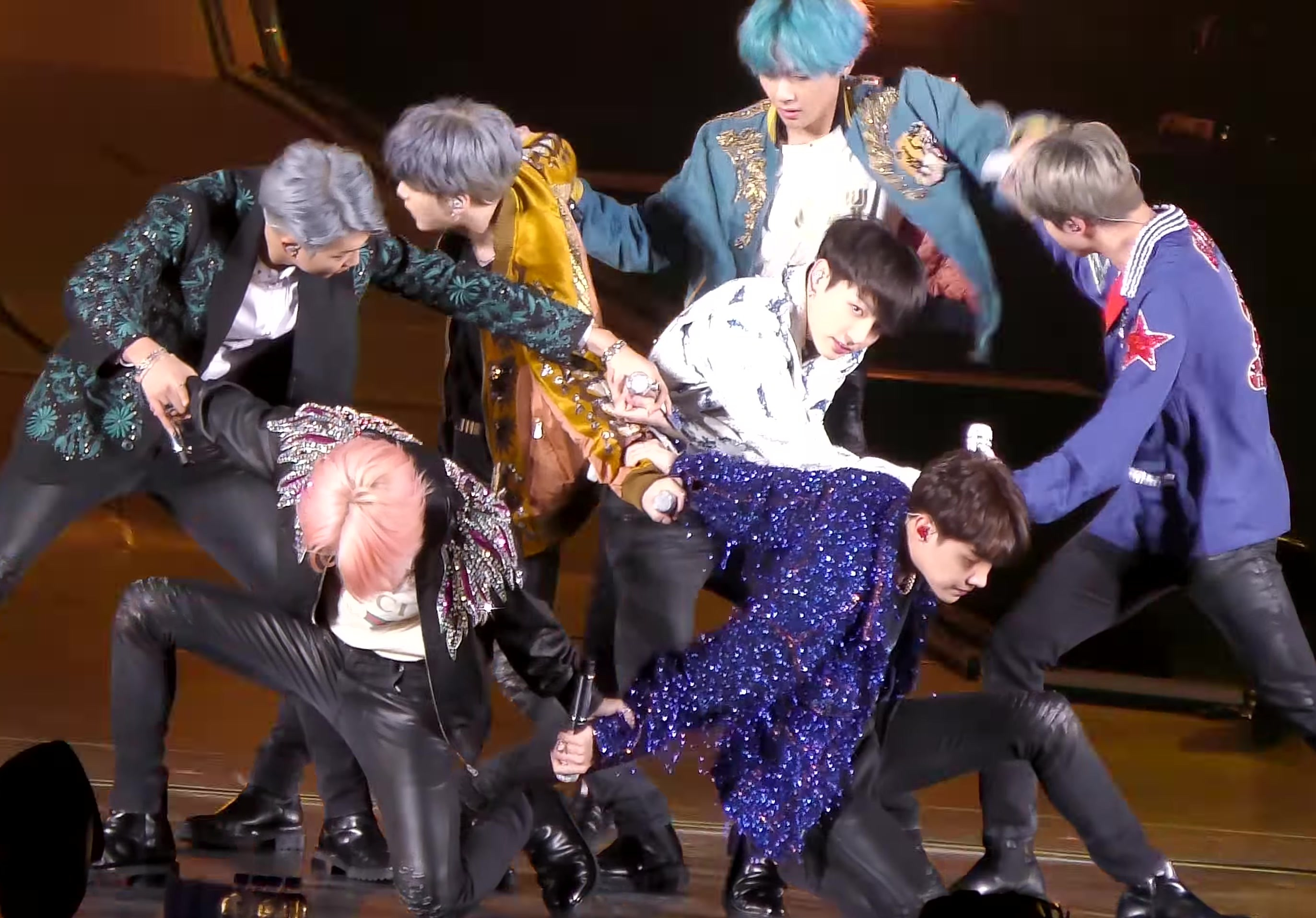
- BTS performing during the Love Yourself World Tour in 2019
- Concert tours: 6
- Concerts: 16
- Fan meeting tours: 6
- Showcases: 9
- Joint tours and concerts: 5

South Korean boy band BTS has performed in five concert tours (three of which have been worldwide), six fan meeting tours, five joint tours, eight showcases, and 41 concerts since their debut in 2013. BTS' debut solo concert tour in 2014, The Red Bullet Tour, began in Asia and then expanded to Australia, North America, and South America, attracting 80,000 spectators. In the midst of The Red Bullet Tour, BTS also held its first concert tour of Japan, Wake Up: Open Your Eyes Japan Tour. In 2015, BTS commenced The Most Beautiful Moment in Life On Stage Tour, which visited various cities in Asia and sold over 182,500 tickets. In 2017, BTS embarked on The Wings Tour, which visited 17 cities in 10 countries around the world and attracted 550,000 spectators.

BTS' next tour broke records, with the 2018–19 Love Yourself World Tour grossing $196.4 million from its last 42 shows, becoming the highest-grossing tour by an act that performs primarily in a non-English language in history. The band's supposed sixth tour, the Map of the Soul Tour, was originally slated to visit 18 cities across nine countries, beginning with four shows in South Korea in April 2020. With the onset of the COVID-19 pandemic, the initial shows were cancelled. The rest of the tour was temporarily postponed in April 2020, and then cancelled in its entirety on August 19, 2021. The band later embarked on the Permission to Dance on Stage concert series, that began with an online-only concert held at Seoul Olympic Stadium in October, then expanded to include their first live performances before an in-person audience in two years, with four shows at SoFi Stadium in Los Angeles in November and December, and ended with four shows at Allegiant Stadium in Las Vegas in April 2022. Comprising 12 performances in total, the series attracted over 4 million attendees, including online viewers and global live-event cinema patrons. BTS' SoFi shows grossed $33.3 million from 214,000 tickets sold and set several records, including earning the biggest box office score by any act in nearly a decade; becoming the largest-grossing run of shows at a single venue since 2012; the biggest US-based boxscore in 18 years; and the sixth best-grossing engagement in Billboard Boxscore history. The band became the first non-English-language act to surpass $20 and $30 million in a single engagement. For the Allegiant shows, BTS are the only act to sell out four nights and 200,000 tickets at the stadium.

On 19 July 2026, BTS co-headlined the 2026 FIFA World Cup final halftime show alongside Madonna, Shakira, and other artists.

== Tours ==
Title	Dates	Associated album(s)	Continent(s)	Shows	Gross	Attendance	Ref.
The Red Bullet Tour	October 17, 2014 – August 29, 2015	2 Cool 4 Skool; O!RUL8,2? Skool Luv Affair; Dark & Wild	Asia; Australia; North America; South America	22	—N/a	80,000	
Wake Up: Open Your Eyes Japan Tour	February 10, 2015 – February 19, 2015	Wake Up	Asia	6	—N/a	25,000	
The Most Beautiful Moment in Life On Stage Tour	November 27, 2015 – August 14, 2016	The Most Beautiful Moment in Life, Pt. 1 and Pt. 2 The Most Beautiful Moment in Life: Young Forever	Asia	22	—N/a	182,500	
The Wings Tour	February 18, 2017 – December 10, 2017	Wings; You Never Walk Alone	Asia; South America; North America; Oceania	40	$6,610,510+ (3 shows)	550,000	
Love Yourself World Tour	August 25, 2018 – October 29, 2019	Love Yourself: Her, Tear and Answer; Map of the Soul: Persona	Asia; North America; Europe; South America	62	$246,512,484	2,019,800	
Map of the Soul Tour	Cancelled	Map of the Soul: Persona; Map of the Soul: 7	Asia; North America; Europe	41	—N/a	—N/a	
Arirang World Tour	April 9, 2026 – March 14, 2027	Arirang	Asia; Australia; Europe; North America; South America	88			

== Concerts ==
Title	Date	City	Country	Venue	Attendance	Ref.
BTS Global Official Fanclub A.R.M.Y 1ST Muster	March 29, 2014	Seoul	South Korea	Olympic Hall	3,000	
BTS 2014 <Show & Prove Concert>	July 14, 2014	West Hollywood	United States	LA Troubadour	250	
2015 BTS Live Trilogy Episode I: BTS Begins	March 28, 2015	Seoul	South Korea	Olympic Hall	6,500	
2015 BTS Live Trilogy Episode I: BTS Begins	March 29, 2015	Seoul	South Korea	Olympic Hall	6,500	
Halloween Party with BTS	October 29, 2015	Seoul	South Korea	V Live	N/A	
BTS 2nd Muster [Zip Code:22920]	January 24, 2016	Seoul	South Korea	Hwajung Gymnasium	9,000	
BTS 3rd Muster [ARMY.ZIP+]	November 12, 2016	Seoul	South Korea	Gocheok Sky Dome	38,000	
BTS 3rd Muster [ARMY.ZIP+]	November 13, 2016	Seoul	South Korea	Gocheok Sky Dome	38,000	
BTS 4th Muster [Happy Ever After]	January 13, 2018	Seoul	South Korea	Gocheok Sky Dome	40,000	
BTS 4th Muster [Happy Ever After]	January 14, 2018	Seoul	South Korea	Gocheok Sky Dome	40,000	
BTS 5th Muster [Magic Shop]	June 15, 2019	Busan	South Korea	Busan Auxiliary Stadium	69,000	
BTS 5th Muster [Magic Shop]	June 16, 2019	Busan	South Korea	Busan Auxiliary Stadium	69,000	
BTS 5th Muster [Magic Shop]	June 22, 2019	Seoul	South Korea	Olympic Gymnastics Arena	69,000	
BTS 5th Muster [Magic Shop]	June 23, 2019	Seoul	South Korea	Olympic Gymnastics Arena	69,000	
Bang Bang Con The Live	June 14, 2020	Incheon	South Korea	VenewLive	756,000	
Map of the Soul ON:E	October 10, 2020	Seoul	South Korea	VenewLive	993,000	
Map of the Soul ON:E	October 11, 2020	Seoul	South Korea	VenewLive	993,000	
BTS 2021 Muster Sowoozoo	June 13, 2021	Seoul	South Korea	Jamsil Auxiliary Stadium / VenewLive	1,330,000	
BTS 2021 Muster Sowoozoo	June 14, 2021 (Note: World Tour version)	Seoul	South Korea	Jamsil Auxiliary Stadium / VenewLive	1,330,000	
BTS Permission to Dance On Stage	October 24, 2021	Seoul	South Korea	Seoul Olympic Stadium / VenewLive	—N/a	
BTS Permission to Dance On Stage	November 27, 2021	Inglewood	United States	SoFi Stadium / YouTube Theater / VenewLive (Note: December 2 show only)	813,000	
BTS Permission to Dance On Stage	November 28, 2021	Inglewood	United States	SoFi Stadium / YouTube Theater / VenewLive	813,000	
BTS Permission to Dance On Stage	December 1, 2021	Inglewood	United States	SoFi Stadium / YouTube Theater / VenewLive	813,000	
BTS Permission to Dance On Stage	December 2, 2021	Inglewood	United States	SoFi Stadium / YouTube Theater / VenewLive	813,000	
BTS Permission to Dance On Stage	March 10, 2022	Seoul	South Korea	Seoul Olympic Stadium / Select global theatres (Note: March 12 show only) / Weverse (Note: March 10 and 13 shows only)	2,465,000	
BTS Permission to Dance On Stage	March 12, 2022	Seoul	South Korea	Seoul Olympic Stadium / Select global theatres / Weverse	2,465,000	
BTS Permission to Dance On Stage	March 13, 2022	Seoul	South Korea	Seoul Olympic Stadium / Select global theatres / Weverse	2,465,000	
BTS Permission to Dance On Stage	April 8, 2022	Las Vegas	United States	Allegiant Stadium / MGM Grand Garden Arena (Note: Live viewing for all four dates) / Weverse (Note: April 16 show only)	624,000	
BTS Permission to Dance On Stage	April 9, 2022	Las Vegas	United States	Allegiant Stadium / MGM Grand Garden Arena / Weverse	624,000	
BTS Permission to Dance On Stage	April 15, 2022	Las Vegas	United States	Allegiant Stadium / MGM Grand Garden Arena / Weverse	624,000	
BTS Permission to Dance On Stage	April 16, 2022	Las Vegas	United States	Allegiant Stadium / MGM Grand Garden Arena / Weverse	624,000	
World Expo 2030 Busan Korea Concert BTS <Yet To Come> in Busan / Live Play	October 15, 2022	Busan	South Korea	Busan Asiad Main Stadium / Busan Port International Passenger Terminal and Haeundae Beach (Note: Live Play venues) / Weverse, Zepeto, Naver NOW (Note: online broadcast)	50,000 / 10,000 & 2,000 / N/A	
BTS The Comeback Live | Arirang	March 21, 2026	Seoul	South Korea	Gwanghwamun, Gwanghwamun Square, Gyeongbokgung Palace / Netflix / Bighit Music / Hybe	N/A	
Spotify x BTS: 'SWIMSIDE'	March 23, 2026	New York City	United States	Pier 17	1,000	
2026 FIFA World Cup final halftime show	July 19, 2026	East Rutherford	United States	MetLife Stadium, East Rutherford	N/A	
2026 iHeartRadio Music Festival	September 18, 2026	Las Vegas	United States	T-Mobile Arena, Las Vegas, Nevada / iHeart Media / Disney+ / Hulu	N/A	

== Fanmeeting tours ==
Title	Date	City	Country	Venue	Attendance	Ref.
Japan Official Fan Meeting Vol.1	May 31, 2014	Tokyo	Japan	Tokyo Dome City Hall	5,000	
2014 BTS' 1st Fan Meeting in Europe & South America <RWeL8?>	July 27, 2014	Berlin	Germany	Huxleys Neue Welt	—N/a	
2014 BTS' 1st Fan Meeting in Europe & South America <RWeL8?>	July 29, 2014	Stockholm	Sweden	Fryshuset (Lilla arenan)	—N/a	
2014 BTS' 1st Fan Meeting in Europe & South America <RWeL8?>	August 1, 2014	São Paulo	Brazil	Via Marquês	—N/a	
Japan Official Fan Meeting Vol.2 –Undercover Mission–	August 13, 2015	Tokyo	Japan	Tokyo International Forum Hall A	18,000	
Japan Official Fan Meeting Vol.2 –Undercover Mission–	August 14, 2015	Tokyo	Japan	Tokyo International Forum Hall A	18,000	
Japan Official Fan Meeting Vol.2 –Undercover Mission–	August 18, 2015	Osaka	Japan	Festival Hall	18,000	
Japan Official Fan Meeting Vol.2 –Undercover Mission–	August 19, 2015	Osaka	Japan	Festival Hall	18,000	
Japan Official Fan Meeting Vol.2 –Undercover Mission–	August 20, 2015	Osaka	Japan	Festival Hall	18,000	
Japan Official Fanmeeting Vol.3 ~Reaching You~	November 9, 2016	Fukuoka	Japan	Marine Messe Fukuoka	70,000	
Japan Official Fanmeeting Vol.3 ~Reaching You~	November 28, 2016	Tokyo	Japan	Yoyogi National Gymnasium	70,000	
Japan Official Fanmeeting Vol.3 ~Reaching You~	November 29, 2016	Tokyo	Japan	Yoyogi National Gymnasium	70,000	
Japan Official Fanmeeting Vol.3 ~Reaching You~	November 30, 2016	Tokyo	Japan	Yoyogi National Gymnasium	70,000	
Japan Official Fanmeeting Vol.3 ~Reaching You~	December 6, 2016	Nagoya	Japan	Nippon Gaishi Hall	70,000	
Japan Official Fanmeeting Vol.3 ~Reaching You~	December 7, 2016	Nagoya	Japan	Nippon Gaishi Hall	70,000	
Japan Official Fanmeeting Vol.3 ~Reaching You~	December 14, 2016	Osaka	Japan	Osaka-jō Hall	70,000	
Japan Official Fanmeeting Vol.3 ~Reaching You~	December 15, 2016	Osaka	Japan	Osaka-jō Hall	70,000	
Japan Official Fanmeeting Vol.4 ~Happy Ever After~	April 18, 2018	Yokohama	Japan	Yokohama Arena	90,000	
Japan Official Fanmeeting Vol.4 ~Happy Ever After~	April 19, 2018	Yokohama	Japan	Yokohama Arena	90,000	
Japan Official Fanmeeting Vol.4 ~Happy Ever After~	April 20, 2018	Yokohama	Japan	Yokohama Arena	90,000	
Japan Official Fanmeeting Vol.4 ~Happy Ever After~	April 21, 2018	Yokohama	Japan	Yokohama Arena	90,000	
Japan Official Fanmeeting Vol.4 ~Happy Ever After~	April 23, 2018	Osaka	Japan	Osaka-jō Hall	90,000	
Japan Official Fanmeeting Vol.4 ~Happy Ever After~	April 24, 2018	Osaka	Japan	Osaka-jō Hall	90,000	
Japan Official Fanmeeting Vol.5 ~Magic Shop~	November 23, 2019	Chiba	Japan	Chiba Marine Stadium	150,000	
Japan Official Fanmeeting Vol.5 ~Magic Shop~	November 24, 2019	Chiba	Japan	Chiba Marine Stadium	150,000	
Japan Official Fanmeeting Vol.5 ~Magic Shop~	December 14, 2019	Osaka	Japan	Kyocera Dome	150,000	
Japan Official Fanmeeting Vol.5 ~Magic Shop~	December 15, 2019	Osaka	Japan	Kyocera Dome	150,000	

== Showcases ==
Showcase	Date	City	Country	Venue	Attendance	Ref.
Single Album '2 Cool 4 Skool' Debut Showcase	June 12, 2013	Seoul	South Korea	Ilchi Art Hall	400	
1st Japan Showcase	December 7, 2013	Tokyo	Japan	Tsutaya O-West	—N/a	
1st Japan Showcase - Next Stage	January 6, 2014	Tokyo	Japan	Zepp Tokyo	6,500	
1st Japan Showcase - Next Stage	January 7, 2014	Osaka	Japan	Namba Hatch	6,500	
2nd Mini Album "Skool Luv Affair' Showcase	February 11, 2014	Seoul	South Korea	Lotte Card Art Center	—N/a	
1st Studio Album 'Dark&Wild' Showcase	August 19, 2014	Seoul	South Korea	Blue Square Samseong Card Hall	1,000	
DNA Comeback Showcase	September 21, 2017	Seoul	South Korea	CJ E&M Center	—N/a	
BTS Comeback Show - Highlight Reel	May 24, 2018	Seoul	South Korea	CJ E&M Center	—N/a	
Map of the Soul : 7 ~ The Journey ~ Online Showcase	July 18, 2020	Gyeonggi-do	South Korea	—N/a	—N/a	
BTS, THE BEST - special online showcase	June 22, 2021	—N/a	South Korea	—N/a	—N/a	

== Joint tours and concerts ==
Event	Date	City	Country	Venue	Ref.
Bridge To Korea Festival	June 14, 2014	Moscow	Russia	All-Russian Exhibition Center	
Bridge To Korea Festival	June 15, 2014	Moscow	Russia	All-Russian Exhibition Center	
KCON	August 10, 2014	Los Angeles	United States	Los Angeles Memorial Sports Arena	
Music Bank World Tour	October 30, 2014	Mexico City	Mexico	Mexico City Arena	
2015 K-Pop Concert Live in Yangon	June 16, 2015	Yangon	Myanmar	Myanmar Event Park	
Highlight 2015 Tour (with Community 54)	September 22, 2015	San Francisco	United States	Nourse Theater	
Highlight 2015 Tour (with Community 54)	September 24, 2015	Houston	United States	House of Blues	
Highlight 2015 Tour (with Community 54)	September 26, 2015	Atlanta	United States	Center Stage	
Highlight 2015 Tour (with Community 54)	September 27, 2015	Toronto	Canada	Phoenix Concert Theatre	
KCON	March 25, 2016	Abu Dhabi	United Arab Emirates	Du Arena	
KCON	June 2, 2016	Paris	France	Paris Accor Hotels Arena	
KCON	June 25, 2016	New York	United States	Prudential Center	
KCON	July 31, 2016	Los Angeles	United States	Staples Center	
KCON	March 17, 2017	Mexico City	Mexico	Mexico City Arena	
Music Bank World Tour	August 4, 2017	Singapore		Suntec Convention Centre	
Seo Taiji 25th Anniversary Concert	September 2, 2017	Seoul	South Korea	Seoul Olympic Stadium	

== Award shows ==
Event	Date	Country	Performed song(s)	Ref.
Melon Music Awards	November 14, 2013	South Korea	"No More Dream", "Attack on Bangtan", "Nice to Meet You" (Baechigi)	
28th Golden Disc Awards	January 16, 2014	South Korea	"No More Dream"	
23rd Seoul Music Awards	January 23, 2014	South Korea	"NO", "No More Dream"	
Mnet Asian Music Awards	December 3, 2014	Hong Kong	"Boy In Luv", "Danger", "RM", "Let's Get It Started" (The Black Eyed Peas)	
29th Golden Disc Awards	January 15, 2015	China	"Intro: Skool Luv Affair", "Boy in Luv", "Danger"	
24th Seoul Music Awards	January 22, 2015	South Korea	"Boy in Luv"	
4th Gaon Chart Music Awards	January 28, 2015	South Korea	"What I Am To You", "Danger"	
Melon Music Awards	November 7, 2015	South Korea	"I Need U"	
Mnet Asian Music Awards	December 2, 2015	Hong Kong	"Run"	
2015 Gala Vietnam Top Hits	January 19, 2016	Vietnam	"Dope","I Need U","Run"	
25th Seoul Music Awards	January 14, 2016	South Korea	"Run", "Dope"	
30th Golden Disc Awards	January 21, 2016	South Korea	"I Need U", "Dope"	
5th Gaon Chart Music Awards	February 17, 2016	South Korea	"I Need U", "Dope"	
Asia Artist Awards	November 16, 2016	South Korea	"Blood Sweat & Tears", "Fire"	
Melon Music Awards	November 19, 2016	South Korea	"Blood Sweat & Tears", "Fire"	
Mnet Asian Music Awards	December 2, 2016	Hong Kong	"Boy Meets Evil", "Blood Sweat & Tears", "Fire"	
31st Golden Disc Awards	January 14, 2017	South Korea	"Without a Heart" (8Eight), "No More Dream", "Boy In Luv", "War of Hormone", "Dope", "I Need U", "Fire"	
26th Seoul Music Awards	January 19, 2017	South Korea	"Boy Meets Evil", "Blood Sweat & Tears", "Fire"	
6th Gaon Chart Music Awards	February 22, 2017	South Korea	"Save Me", "Blood Sweat & Tears"	
45th Annual American Music Awards	November 19, 2017	United States	"DNA"	
Mnet Asian Music Awards	December 1, 2017	Hong Kong	"Not Today", "BTS Cypher Pt. 4", "DNA", "Mic Drop" (Steve Aoki Remix)	
Melon Music Awards	December 2, 2017	South Korea	"DNA", "You Never Walk Alone", "Spring Day"	
32nd Golden Disc Awards	January 10, 2018	South Korea	"Outro:Her", "Spring Day"	
32nd Golden Disc Awards	January 11, 2018	South Korea	"Not Today", "DNA"	
Seoul Music Awards	January 25, 2018	South Korea	"Mic Drop", "DNA"	
Billboard Music Awards	May 20, 2018	United States	"Fake Love"	
Soribada Best K-Music Awards	August 30, 2018	South Korea	"Idol", "Fake Love"	
MBC Plus X Genie Music Awards	November 6, 2018	South Korea	"We Don't Talk Anymore" (with Charlie Puth), "Fake Love", "Save Me", "I'm Fine", "Idol"	
Asia Artist Awards	November 28, 2018	South Korea	"Fake Love", "Idol"	
Melon Music Awards	December 1, 2018	South Korea	"Fake Love", "Airplane Pt. 2", "Idol"	
Mnet Asian Music Awards	December 12, 2018	Japan	"Fake Love", "Anpanman"	
Mnet Asian Music Awards	December 14, 2018	Hong Kong	"Airplane Pt. 2", “O!RUL82?" (LY Remix), "Idol"	
33rd Golden Disc Awards	January 6, 2019	South Korea	"Fake Love", "Idol"	
28th Seoul Music Awards	January 15, 2019	South Korea	"Fake Love", "Idol"	
Billboard Music Awards	May 1, 2019	United States	"Boy with Luv"	
Melon Music Awards	November 30, 2019	South Korea	"Intro: Persona", "Boy in Luv", "Boy with Luv", "Mikrokosmos", "Dionysus"	
Mnet Asian Music Awards	December 4, 2019	Japan	"N.O", "We Are Bulletproof Pt. 2", "Boy with Luv", "Mikrokosmos", "Dionysus"	
34th Golden Disc Awards	January 5, 2020	South Korea	"Boy with Luv", "Intro: Skool Luv Affair", "Dimple", "Mikrokosmos", "Dionysus"	
62nd Annual Grammy Awards	January 26, 2020	United States	"Old Town Road" (Seoul Town Road remix) (with Lil Nas X)	
MTV Video Music Awards	August 30, 2020	United States	"Dynamite"	
Billboard Music Awards	October 14, 2020	United States	"Dynamite"	
American Music Awards	November 22, 2020	United States	"Dynamite", "Life Goes On"	
Melon Music Awards	December 5, 2020	South Korea	"Black Swan", "On", "Life Goes On", "Dynamite"	
Mnet Asian Music Awards	December 6, 2020	South Korea	"Life Goes On", "On", "Dynamite"	
The Fact Music Awards	December 12, 2020	South Korea	"Dynamite", "Life Goes On"	
62nd Japan Record Awards	December 30, 2020	Japan	"Life Goes On", "Dynamite"	
Golden Disc Awards	January 9–10, 2021	South Korea	"Black Swan", "On", "Life Goes On", "Dynamite" (Slow Jam Remix)	
63rd Annual Grammy Awards	March 14, 2021	United States	"Dynamite"	
Billboard Music Awards	May 23, 2021	United States	"Butter"	
The Fact Music Awards	October 2, 2021	South Korea	"Boy with Luv", "Butter", "Permission to Dance"	
American Music Awards	November 21, 2021	United States	"My Universe" (with Coldplay), "Butter"	
64th Annual Grammy Awards	April 3, 2022	United States	"Butter"	
The Fact Music Awards	October 8, 2022	South Korea	"Yet to Come", "For Youth"	
American Music Awards	May 25, 2026	United States	"Hooligan"	

== Television shows and specials ==
Event	Date	Country	Performed song(s)	Ref.
SBS Gayo Daejeon	December 29, 2013	South Korea	"No More Dream"	
MBC Gayo Daejejeon	December 31, 2013	South Korea	"Rise Up/School Anthem" (Sechs Kies), "Warrior's Descendant" (H.O.T.), "No More Dream"	
KBS Song Festival	December 26, 2014	South Korea	"Danger", "Stupid in Love" (Soyou), "Tricky" (Run-DMC), "Happy" (Pharrell Williams)	
MBC Gayo Daejejeon	December 31, 2014	South Korea	"Danger"	
Summer Sonic Festival	August 16, 2015	Japan	"We are Bulletproof Pt.2", "War of Hormone", "Dope", "Hip Hop Phile", "BTS Cypher Pt. 3: Killer", "Attack on Bangtan", (Japanese Ver.)	
KBS Song Festival	December 30, 2015	South Korea	"Yanghwa Bridge" (Zion.T), "Butterfly", "Dope", "Run", "Hypest Hype (Chase & Status)", "We Run The World" (Pdogg)	
MBC Gayo Daejejeon	December 31, 2015	South Korea	"I Need U", "Run", "Perfect Man" (Shinhwa)	
A-Nation Stadium Fes.	August 16, 2016	Japan	"Fire", "Save Me", "I Need U", "No More Dream", "Attack on Bangtan", "Dope"	
MBC Music Show Champion in Manila	September 3, 2016	Philippines	"Fire", "Save Me", "Dope"	
Star Show 360	November 7, 2016	South Korea	"Blood Sweat & Tears", "Fire"	
SBS Gayo Daejeon	December 26, 2016	South Korea	"Blood Sweat & Tears", "Fire"	
KBS Song Festival	December 29, 2016	South Korea	"Idea of Classroom" (Seo Taiji and the Boys), "Lie", "Unknown Song" (Michael Jackson), "A Flying Butterfly" (Yoon Do Hyun Band), "Blood Sweat & Tears", "Fire"	
MBC Gayo Daejejeon	December 31, 2016	South Korea	"Rainism" (Rain), "As I Told You" (Kim Sung-jae), "Blood Sweat & Tears", "Fire"	
BTS Countdown	October 12, 2017	South Korea	"Go Go", "Tomorrow", "Like", "BTS Cypher Pt. 4", "Lost", "Dope", "Mic Drop", "DNA"	
The Ellen DeGeneres Show	November 25, 2017	United States	"Mic Drop"	
Jimmy Kimmel Live!	November 27, 2017	United States	"Mic Drop"	
The Late Late Show with James Corden	November 30, 2017	United States	"DNA"	
Music Station Super Live	December 22, 2017	Japan	"DNA" (Japanese version)	
SBS Gayo Daejeon	December 25, 2017	South Korea	"Mic Drop", "DNA", "Not Today"	
KBS Song Festival	December 29, 2017	South Korea	"Spring Day" (Brit Rock Remix), "Lost", "BTS Cypher Pt. 4", "DNA", "Not Today"	
MBC Gayo Daejejeon	December 31, 2017	South Korea	"Go Go", "Mic Drop"	
Dick Clark's New Year's Rockin' Eve	December 31, 2017	United States	"Mic Drop", "DNA"	
The Ellen DeGeneres Show	May 25, 2018	United States	"Fake Love", "Airplane Pt. 2"	
The Late Late Show with James Corden	June 12, 2018	United States	"Fake Love"	
Lotte Duty Free Family Concert	June 22, 2018	South Korea	"Fake Love", "Anpanman", "Mic Drop", "Airplane Pt. 2", "Spring Day", "Fire"	
America's Got Talent	September 12, 2018	United States	"Idol"	
The Tonight Show Starring Jimmy Fallon	September 25, 2018	United States	"Idol", "I'm Fine"	
Good Morning America	September 26, 2018	United States	"Idol"	
The Graham Norton Show	October 12, 2018	United Kingdom	"Idol"	
SBS Gayo Daejeon	December 25, 2018	South Korea	"No More Dream", "Boy In Luv", "Dope", "Fire", "DNA", "Idol"	
KBS Song Festival	December 28, 2018	South Korea	"Just Dance" (J-Hope), "Euphoria" (Jungkook), "Serendipity" (Jimin), "Love" (RM), "Singularity" (V), "Seesaw"(Suga), "Epiphany" (Jin), "Fake Love"	
MBC Gayo Daejejeon	December 31, 2018	South Korea	"Mic Drop" (Steve Aoki remix), "Idol"	
Saturday Night Live	April 13, 2019	United States	"Boy with Luv", "Mic Drop"	
The Late Show with Stephen Colbert	May 15, 2019	United States	"Boy with Luv", "Make It Right"	
Good Morning America Summer Concert Series	May 15, 2019	United States	"Boy with Luv", "Fire"	
The Voice	May 22, 2019	United States	"Boy with Luv"	
Britain's Got Talent	May 30, 2019	United Kingdom	"Boy with Luv"	
NTV's Music Day	July 6, 2019	Japan	"Boy with Luv", (Japanese Ver.)	
Lotte Duty Free Family Concert	August 11, 2019	South Korea	"Boy with Luv", "Home", "Best Of Me", "Fake Love", "Mic Drop", "Idol"	
FNS Music Festival	December 4, 2019	Japan	"Fake Love" (Japanese Ver.), "Boy With Luv" (Japanese Ver.)	
KIIS-FM Jingle Ball	December 6, 2019	United States	"Mic Drop", "Make It Right", "Boy with Luv"	
SBS Gayo Daejeon	December 25, 2019	South Korea	"Oh Holy Night", "Jingle Bell Rock", "Santa Claus Is Comin' to Town", "Feliz Navidad", "Silent Night" (고요한밤 거룩한밤), "Boy with Luv", "Dionysus", "Mikrokosmos"	
KBS Song Festival	December 27, 2019	South Korea	"Go Go", "Home", "Boy with Luv, "Mikrokosmos", "Dionysus"	
Dick Clark's New Year's Rockin' Eve	December 31, 2019	United States	"Make It Right", "Boy with Luv",	
The Late Late Show with James Corden	January 28, 2020	United States	"Black Swan"	
The Tonight Show Starring Jimmy Fallon	February 24, 2020	United States	"On"	
The Late Late Show with James Corden – HomeFest Special	March 30, 2020	South Korea	Boy With Luv	
Dear Class of 2020 - Youtube Originals	June 7, 2020	South Korea	"Boy with Luv", "Spring Day", "Mikrokosmos"	
TBS CDTV	June 22, 2020	Japan	"Stay Gold"	
TBS CDTV	July 13, 2020	Japan	"Your Eyes Tell"	
NTV Sukkiri	July 14, 2020	Japan	"Stay Gold"	
Buzz Rhythm 02	July 18, 2020	Japan	"Stay Gold"	
NHK SONGS	July 18, 2020	Japan	"Stay Gold", "Black Swan"	
Fuji TV's Love Music	July 27, 2020	Japan	"Your Eyes Tell"	
Waktu Indonesia Belanja Tv Show	July 29, 2020	Indonesia	"Boy with Luv", "On"	
FNS Music Festival Summer	August 26, 2020	Japan	"Stay Gold", "Mic Drop",	
Press Play At Home	September 3, 2020	South Korea	"Dynamite"	
Citi Music Series	September 10, 2020	United States	"Dynamite", "Anpanman"	
NTV's The Music Day	September 12, 2020	Japan	"Dynamite"	
America's Got Talent	September 16, 2020	United States	"Dynamite"	
iHeartRadio Music Festival	September 18, 2020	United States	"Dynamite", "Make It Right", "Spring Day", "Boy with Luv"	
Tiny Desk (Home) Concert	September 21, 2020	South Korea	"Dynamite", "Save Me", "Spring Day"	
Collection:live From the Grammy Museum	September 24, 2020	South Korea	"Dynamite"	
Lotte Duty Free Family Concert	September 27, 2020	South Korea	"Black Swan", "Make It Right", "Boy with Luv"	
The Tonight Show Starring Jimmy Fallon	September 28, 2020	United States	"Dynamite" (with Jimmy Fallon and The Roots), "Idol"	
The Tonight Show Starring Jimmy Fallon	September 29, 2020	United States	"Home"	
The Tonight Show Starring Jimmy Fallon	September 30, 2020	United States	"Black Swan"	
The Tonight Show Starring Jimmy Fallon	October 1, 2020	United States	"Mikrokosmos"	
The Tonight Show Starring Jimmy Fallon	October 2, 2020	United States	"Dynamite"	
The Late Late Show with James Corden	November 23, 2020	United States	"Life Goes On"	
The Late Late Show with James Corden	November 24, 2020	United States	"Dynamite"	
NTV's Best Artist 2020	November 25, 2020	Japan	"Dynamite"	
The Disney Holiday Singalong	November 30, 2020	United States	"Santa Claus Is Comin' to Town"	
FNS Music Festival	December 2, 2020	Japan	"Dynamite"	
NBC's TIME Person of the Year Special	December 10, 2020	United States	"Dynamite"	
KBS Song Festival	December 18, 2020	South Korea	"I Need U", "Dynamite", "Life Goes On"	
CDTV Live! Live! Christmas Special	December 21, 2020	Japan	"Dynamite"	
SBS Gayo Daejeon	December 25, 2020	South Korea	"Black Swan", "Life Goes On", "Dynamite" (Holiday Remix)	
2021 New Year's Eve Live	December 31, 2020	South Korea	"Dynamite", "Best of Me", "Mic Drop", "Make It Right", "Boy with Luv", "Life Goes On"	
MTV Unplugged Presents	February 23, 2021	United States	"Telepathy", "Blue & Grey", "Fix You" (Coldplay cover), "Life Goes On", "Dynamite"	
MusiCares' Music On A Mission	March 12, 2021	United States	"Dynamite"	
2021 Special Talk Show [Let's BTS]	March 29, 2021	South Korea	"Dynamite" (Slow Jam Remix), "Life Goes On"	
Lotte Duty Free Family Concert	May 16, 2021	South Korea	"Life Goes On", "Telepathy", "Dynamite"	
The Late Show with Stephen Colbert	May 25, 2021	United States	"Butter"	
Good Morning America Summer Concert Series	May 28, 2021	United States	"Dynamite" (Tropical Remix), "Butter"	
CDTV Live! Live!	June 14, 2021	Japan	"Film Out"	
NTV Music Blood	June 18, 2021	Japan	"Butter", "Film Out"	
CDTV Live! Live!	June 21, 2021	Japan	"Butter"	
NTV's The Music Day	July 3, 2021	Japan	"Butter"	
Naver NOW Comeback Special: A Butterful Getaway with BTS	July 9, 2021	South Korea	"Butter" (Cooler Remix), "Spring Day", "Permission to Dance"	
The Tonight Show Starring Jimmy Fallon	July 13, 2021	United States	"Permission to Dance"	
FNS Summer Song Festival	July 14, 2021	Japan	"Butter"	
The Tonight Show Starring Jimmy Fallon	July 14, 2021	United States	"Butter"	
TBS' Music Day 2021	July 17, 2021	Japan	"Permission to Dance"	
BBC Radio 1 Live Lounge special: BTS @ Radio 1	July 27, 2021	United Kingdom	"Dynamite", "Permission to Dance", "I'll Be Missing You" (Puff Daddy and Faith Evans feat. 112 cover)	
76th United Nations General Assembly: SDG Moment	September 20, 2021	United States	"Permission to Dance"	
Global Citizen Live 2021	September 25, 2021	South Korea	"Permission to Dance", "Butter"	
The Late Late Show with James Corden	November 23, 2021	United States	"Permission to Dance"	
KIIS-FM Jingle Ball	December 3, 2021	United States	"Dynamite" (Holiday Remix), "Butter"	
The Late Late Show with James Corden	December 9, 2021	United States	"Butter"	
The Tonight Show Starring Jimmy Fallon	March 25, 2026	United States	"Swim"	
The Tonight Show Starring Jimmy Fallon	March 26, 2026	United States	"2.0"	
