= The Red Bullet Tour =

2014–15 concert tour by BTS

- Continental tour by BTS
- Location: Asia
- Associated album: 2 Cool 4 Skool; O!RUL8,2?; Skool Luv Affair; Dark & Wild
- Start date: October 17, 2014
- End date: March 8, 2015 (Note: The first half of the tour ended on March 8, 2015; however a separately named world tour extension, called "2015 BTS Live Trilogy Episode II: The Red Bullet", was eventually added.)
- No. of shows: 10

BTS concert chronology
- 2014 BTS Live Trilogy Episode II: The Red Bullet (2014); BTS 1st Japan Tour 2015 "Wake Up: Open Your Eyes" (2015)

The Red Bullet Tour, also known as 2014 BTS Live Trilogy Episode II: The Red Bullet and 2015 BTS Live Trilogy Episode II: The Red Bullet, was the first concert tour headlined by South Korean boy band BTS to promote their 2 Cool 4 Skool (2013) debut single album, O!RUL8,2? (2013) EP, Skool Luv Affair (2014) EP, and Dark & Wild (2014) studio album. The tour began on October 17, 2014, in South Korea and initially visited six cities in Asia. Its world tour extension began on June 6, 2015, in Malaysia and toured Australia, North America and Latin America before ending in Hong Kong that August. In all, the entire tour attracted 80,000 spectators at 18 cities in 13 countries.

== Background ==
Following the release of their first studio album Dark & Wild August 2014, BTS released a video teaser on YouTube and a poster on September 4, 2014, announcing their first concert tour, titled 2014 BTS Live Trilogy Episode II: The Red Bullet, with October dates for two shows at AX-Korea in South Korea. The two shows sold out within 2 minutes, prompting the addition of a third show in South Korea followed by dates in Japan, the Philippines, Singapore and Thailand.

== Set list ==
The following set list is obtained from the show on December 7, 2014, in Manila, Philippines. It is not intended to represent all dates throughout the tour.

1. N.O
2. We Are Bulletproof Pt 2.
3. We On
4. Hiphop Lover
5. Let Me Know
6. Rain
7. Embarrassed
8. Just One Day
9. Look Here
10. Outro: Propose (Jin, Jimin, V, Jungkook)
11. No More Dream
12. Tomorrow
13. Miss Right
14. I Like It
15. If I Ruled the World
16. Cypher Pt.3 Killer (Rap Monster, SUGA, J-Hope)
17. Cypher Pt.2 Triptych (encore)
18. War of Hormone
19. Danger
20. Boy In Luv

Encore

21. Road/Path
22. Jump
23. Attack On Bangtan
24. Paldogangsan

== Tour dates ==
List of tour dates
Date	City	Country	Venue	Attendance
October 17, 2014	Seoul	South Korea	AX-Korea	5,000
October 18, 2014	Seoul	South Korea	AX-Korea	5,000
October 19, 2014	Seoul	South Korea	AX-Korea	5,000
November 13, 2014	Kobe	Japan	Kobe Kokusai Hall	10,000
November 14, 2014	Kobe	Japan	Kobe Kokusai Hall	10,000
November 16, 2014	Tokyo	Japan	Tokyo International Forum	10,000
December 7, 2014	Pasay	Philippines	Mall of Asia Arena	
December 13, 2014	Singapore		The Star Performing Arts Centre	—
December 20, 2014	Bangkok	Thailand	CWN Hall	—
March 8, 2015	Taipei	Taiwan	New Taipei City Exhibition Hall	—

== World tour extension ==
2015 BTS Live Trilogy Episode II: The Red Bullet
- World tour by BTS
- Official poster for US leg
- Location: Asia; Oceania; North America; South America
- Associated album: 2 Cool 4 Skool; O!RUL8,2?; Skool Luv Affair; Dark & Wild
- Start date: June 6, 2015
- End date: August 29, 2015
- No. of shows: 12

BTS concert chronology
- BTS 1st Japan Tour 2015 "Wake Up: Open Your Eyes" (2015); 2015 BTS Live Trilogy Episode II: The Red Bullet (2015); 2015 BTS LIVE "The Most Beautiful Moment in Life On Stage" (2015)

=== Background ===
On May 7, 2015, BTS announced a full-scale world tour extension, titled 2015 BTS Live Trilogy Episode II: The Red Bullet, starting June 6 at the Mega Star Arena in Malaysia followed by July dates in Australia and the United States.

=== Reception ===
Shows in Dallas, Chicago, Los Angeles, and New York City were all sold out in the matter of minutes. BTS performed for over 12,500 fans for the US leg alone. The two concerts in Melbourne and Sydney were also sold out, despite the fact that the cities were located in a place that traditionally did not experience that level of success when it comes to selling out venues for K-pop acts. In Brazil, similar success happened. The original venue would have a maximum capacity of 2,000 people, however due to high demand the promoters transferred the concert to a venue with more than twice the capacity.

According to Billboard, BTS made their concert memorable with their outstanding performances.

"A staple of K-pop concerts is the meticulously rehearsed choreography and CD-quality vocals prepared for every performance of the night. For their New York City debut, BTS did that, of course, but also showed a more relaxed and freer side of themselves that made the show that much more memorable -- even with an abrupt finish."

— Jeff Benjamin of Billboard

=== Set list ===
The following set list is obtained from the show on July 10, 2015, in Sydney, Australia. It is not intended to represent all dates throughout the tour extension.

1. N.O
2. We Are Bulletproof Pt 2.
3. We On
4. Hiphop Lover
5. Let Me Know
6. Rain
7. Embarrassed
8. Just One Day
9. Look Here
10. Outro: Propose (Jin, Jimin, V, Jungkook)
11. No More Dream
12. Tomorrow
13. Miss Right
14. I Like It
15. If I Ruled The World
16. Jump
17. Cypher Pt.3 Killer (Rap Monster, SUGA, J-Hope)
18. Cypher Pt.2 Triptych (encore)
19. War of Hormone
20. Danger
21. I NEED U
22. Boy In Luv

Encore

23. Path/Road
24. DOPE
25. Boyz With Fun
26. Attack On Bangtan

=== Tour dates ===
List of tour dates
Date	City	Country	Venue	Attendance
June 6, 2015	Kuala Lumpur	Malaysia	Mega Star Arena	3,000
July 10, 2015	Sydney	Australia	Roundhouse	—
July 12, 2015	Melbourne	Australia	Plenary 1	—
July 16, 2015	New York	United States	Best Buy Theater	12,500
July 18, 2015	Grand Prairie	United States	Verizon Theatre at Grand Prairie	12,500
July 24, 2015	Rosemont	United States	Rosemont Theatre	12,500
July 26, 2015	Los Angeles	United States	Club Nokia	12,500
July 29, 2015	Mexico City	Mexico	Pabellon Oeste	4,000
July 31, 2015	São Paulo	Brazil	Espaço das Américas	6,000
August 2, 2015	Santiago	Chile	Movistar Arena	7,000
August 8, 2015	Pak Kret	Thailand	Thunder Dome	5,000
August 29, 2015	Hong Kong	China	AsiaWorld-Arena	4,000
