= I'll Be There (Jin song) =

Single by Jin

from the EP Happy
- Released: October 25, 2024
- Length: 3:01
- Label: Big Hit
- Songwriters: Jo Yoon-kyung; Evan; Ghstloop; Jin; Martin Masarov; Max; Pdogg
- Producers: Evan; Pdogg; Ghstloop

Jin singles chronology
"The Astronaut" (2022)	"I'll Be There" (2024)	"Running Wild" (2024)

Music video
- "I'll Be There" on YouTube

"I'll Be There" is a song by South Korean singer Jin of BTS for his debut extended play, Happy. It was released as the EP's pre-release single on October 25, 2024, through Big Hit Music.

== Charts ==
Chart performance for "I'll Be There"
Chart (2024)	Peak position
Global 200 (Billboard)	25
Hong Kong (Billboard)	24
Indonesia (Billboard)	19
Japan Hot 100 (Billboard)	40
Japan Combined Singles (Oricon)	46
New Zealand Hot Singles (RMNZ)	9
Philippines (Philippines Hot 100)	36
Singapore (RIAS)	10
South Korea (Circle)	63
UK Singles (OCC)	44
UK Indie (OCC)	6
US Bubbling Under Hot 100 (Billboard)	8
US Digital Song Sales (Billboard)	3
US World Digital Song Sales (Billboard)	1

== Release history ==
"I'll Be There" release history
Region	Date	Format	Label	Ref.
Various	October 25, 2024	CD single; digital download; streaming	Big Hit	
