= Happy (Jin EP) =

2024 EP by Jin

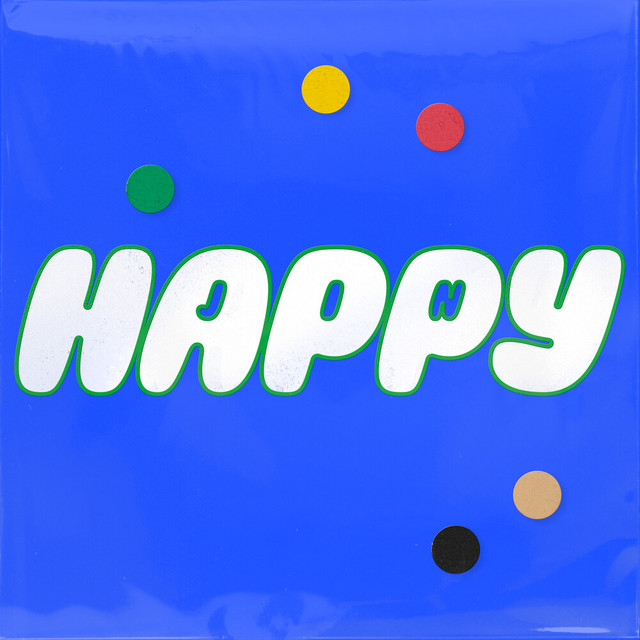
- Digital cover

EP by Jin
- Released: November 15, 2024
- Length: 16:49
- Languages: Korean; English
- Label: Big Hit

Jin chronology
Happy (2024)	Echo (2025)

Singles from Happy
- 1. "I'll Be There" Released: October 25, 2024; 2. "Running Wild" Released: November 15, 2024; 3. "Falling" Released: November 26, 2024

Happy is the debut extended play (EP) by South Korean singer Jin of BTS, released on November 15, 2024, through Big Hit Music.

== Background and release ==
In 2022, Jin debuted as a solo artist with his song "The Astronaut". Shortly after the song's release, Jin enlisted for South Korea's mandatory military service, serving until July 2024. Happy was announced on October 14, with Big Hit Music confirming that the album would contain six tracks, including pre-released single "I'll Be There" and the title track "Running Wild". The album contains collaborations with Gary Barlow of English pop group Take That, Wendy of Red Velvet, and Taka of Japanese rock band One Ok Rock.

== Critical reception ==
According to Rhian Daly of NME, with Happy, Jin "creates a bubble of positivity, filling it up with brightness and levity while acknowledging the shadows and struggles that allow that cheerful spirit to shine harder when it finds you"; she described it as an album that "ingratiates itself with you more and more with each spin," highlighting "Heart on the Window" as a standout track. Jeff Benjamin of Billboard noted that "With Happy, Jin proves his capacity to creatively grow and explore fresh musical landscapes while still staying deeply connected to the roots of his BTS journey. With warmth, optimism and universal messages, Happy has the qualities to not only enchant loyal fans, but entertain entirely new audiences — and does so while conveying his most authentic self." Writing for Teen Vogue, Jiye Kim stated that the work is "about energetic movement of the individual towards a chosen goal and greater intimacy with the other. In recognition of this, the final touch of this album is that it's not only easy to sing along to in the home or car, but in a live setting with him," observing that "Jin's voice traverses from rich and low to soaring highs over the band's rhythmic charge" throughout the record. Neil Z. Yeung of AllMusic called it "a great start by any metric" and "a breezy and feel-good EP that lives up to its title."

== Track listing ==
Happy track listing
No.	Title	Writer(s)	Producer(s)	Length
1.	"Running Wild"	Gary Barlow; Jacob Attwooll; Josh Record; Ryan Carline	Carline; Attwooll; Record	2:31
2.	"I'll Be There"	Jo Yoon-kyung; Evan; Ghstloop; Jin; Martin Masarov; Max; Pdogg	Evan; Pdogg; Ghstloop	3:01
3.	"Another Level"	Pdogg; Matt Thomson; Max Lynedoch Graham; Matt Attard; Jon Bellion; Pete Nappi; Tenroc; Ben Samama; Oscar Bell; Jin; Lee Seu-ran; Zaya (153/Joombas); Hwang Yoo Bin (XYXX); Lee Eun Hwa (153/Joombas); Ellie Suh (153/Joombas); Liljune (153/Joombas); Tru (153/Joombas)	Attard; Pdogg; Arcades	2:42
4.	"Falling" (네게 닿을 때까지)	Pdogg; Taka; Toru; Ghstloop; Meg (Megmetal); Lee Seu-ran; Jo; Jin; Suh; Hwang	Taka; Toru; Pdogg; Ghstloop	2:58
5.	"Heart on the Window" (with Wendy)	Pdogg; Alex Karlsson; Shorelle; Lee Seu-ran; Suh; Jo	Pdogg	2:57
6.	"I Will Come to You" (그리움에)	Jin; Leon Else; Joshua Thompson	Thompson	2:36
Total length:				16:49

Notes

- Various digital editions of the album include either a voice memo or remixes of "Running Wild" as additional tracks.

== Personnel ==
Musicians

- Jin – lead vocals (all tracks), background vocals (track 1)
- Ryan Carline – bass, keyboards, percussion, programming (track 1)
- Gary Barlow – keyboards, percussion, programming (track 1)
- Jacob Attwooll – background vocals (track 1)
- Josh Record – background vocals (track 1)
- Karl Brazil – drums (track 1)
- Ben Mark –guitar (track 1)
- Pdogg – drum programming, synthesizer (tracks 2–5); keyboards (2, 4, 5), guitar (5)
- Who – bass (tracks 2–5)
- Ghstloop – drum programming (tracks 2, 4), harmony vocals (2)
- Max – background vocals, harmony vocals (track 2)
- Young – guitar (tracks 2, 3, 5)
- Evan – guitar, keyboards, harmony vocals, synthesizer (track 2)
- Maiz – harmony vocals (track 2)
- Pxpillon – harmony vocals (track 2)
- James Keys – background vocals (tracks 3–5)
- Matt Attard – drum programming, keyboards, synthesizer (track 3)
- Matt Thomson – drum programming, keyboards, synthesizer (track 3)
- Max Lynedoch Graham – drum programming, keyboards, synthesizer (track 3)
- Megmetal – drum programming (track 4)
- Toru – guitar (track 4)
- Taka – whistle (track 4)
- Shorelle – background vocals (track 5)
- Joshua Thompson – piano (track 6)

Technical

- Chris Gehringer – mastering
- Serban Ghenea – mixing (track 1)
- Mark "Spike" Stent – mixing (track 2)
- James F. Reynolds – mixing (track 3)
- Manny Marroquin – mixing (tracks 4, 5)
- Yang Ga – mixing (track 6)
- Pdogg – engineering, vocal arrangement (all tracks); sound editing (tracks 2–6)
- Ryan Carline – engineering (track 1)
- Ryan Siegel – engineering, vocal arrangement (track 2)
- Young – engineering (tracks 2, 3)
- James Keys – engineering (tracks 3–5)
- Megmetal – engineering (track 4)
- Shorelle – engineering (track 5)
- Ghstloop – sound editing (tracks 2–6)
- Bryce Bordone – mixing assistance (track 1)
- Kieron Beardmore – mixing assistance (track 2)
- Matt Wolach – mixing assistance (track 2)
- James Cunningham – mixing assistance (track 3)
- Chris Galland – mixing assistance (tracks 4, 5)
- Ramiro Fernandez-Seoane – mixing assistance (tracks 4, 5)

== Charts ==
=== Weekly charts ===
Weekly chart performance
Chart (2024)	Peak position
Australian Albums (ARIA)	51
Austrian Albums (Ö3 Austria)	7
Belgian Albums (Ultratop Flanders)	70
Belgian Albums (Ultratop Wallonia)	19
Canadian Albums (Billboard)	43
French Albums (SNEP)	20
German Albums (Offizielle Top 100)	16
Greek Albums (IFPI)	18
Hungarian Albums (MAHASZ)	14
Italian Albums (FIMI)	75
Japanese Albums (Oricon)	2
Japanese Combined Albums (Oricon)	2
Japanese Hot Albums (Billboard Japan)	2
Lithuanian Albums (AGATA)	19
New Zealand Albums (RMNZ)	16
Polish Albums (ZPAV)	5
Portuguese Albums (AFP)	74
Scottish Albums (Official Charts)	13
South Korean Albums (Circle)	3
Swiss Albums (Schweizer Hitparade)	11
UK Albums Sales (OCC)	19
US Billboard 200	4
US World Albums (Billboard)	2

=== Monthly charts ===
Monthly chart performance
Chart (2024)	Peak position
Japanese Albums (Oricon)	3
South Korean Albums (Circle)	5

=== Year-end charts ===
2024 year-end chart performance for Ate
Chart (2024)	Position
Japanese Albums (Oricon)	14
South Korean Albums (Circle)	24

2025 year-end chart performance for Ate
Chart (2025)	Position
US World Albums (Billboard)	15

== Certifications ==
Certifications
Region	Certification	Certified units/sales
Japan (RIAJ)	Platinum	250,000^{^}
South Korea (KMCA)	3× Platinum	750,000^{^}
^{^} Shipments figures based on certification alone.

== Release history ==
Happy release history
Region	Date	Format	Label
Various	November 15, 2024	Digital download; streaming	Big Hit
South Korea	November 15, 2024	CD	Big Hit; YG Plus
