= List of Gaon Album Chart number ones of 2014 =

The Gaon Album Chart is a record chart that ranks the best-selling albums and EPs in South Korea. It is part of the Gaon Music Chart which launched in February 2010. The data for the chart is compiled by the Ministry of Culture, Sports and Tourism and the Korean Music Content Industry Association based on weekly and monthly physical album sales by major distributors such as LOEN Entertainment, KT Music, Sony Music Korea, Warner Music Korea, Universal Music and Mnet Media.

Overall, Exo-K's Overdose (Korean Version) was Gaon's best selling album of 2014, selling 385,047 copies.

== Weekly charts ==
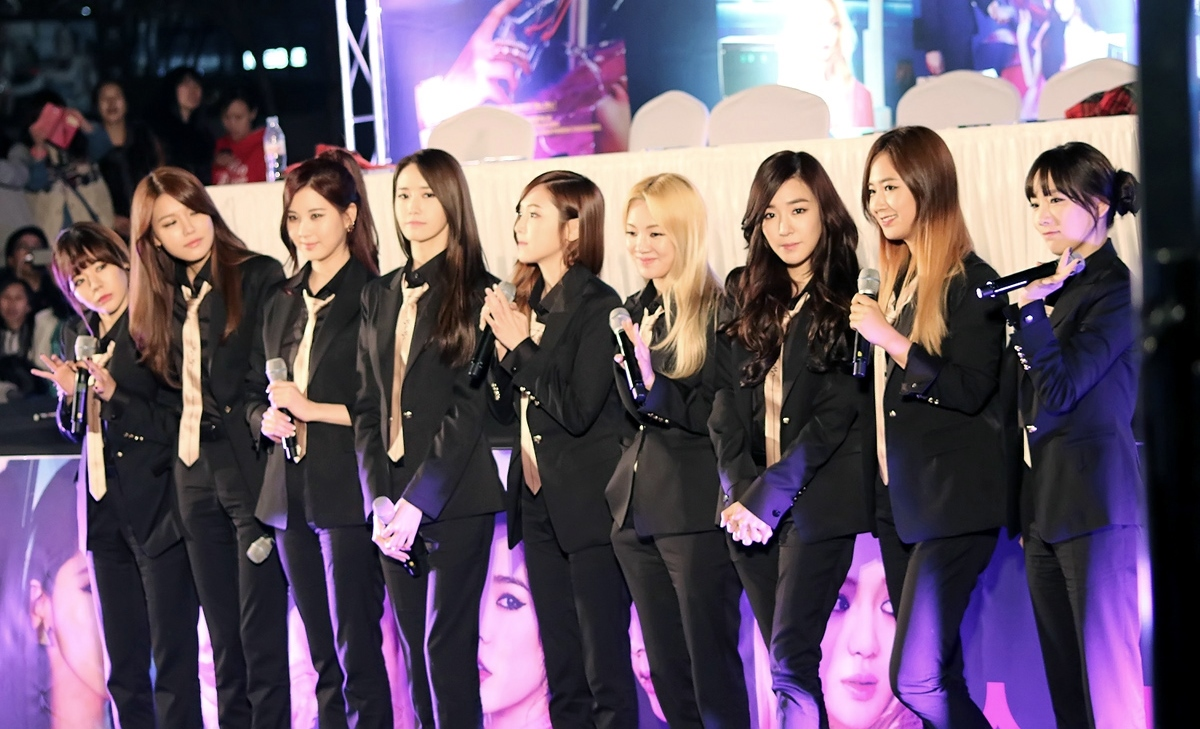
Girls' Generation's Mr.Mr. was South Korea's best selling album by a female artist of 2014. The group's subunit Girls' Generation-TTS topped a weekly album chart with Holler.

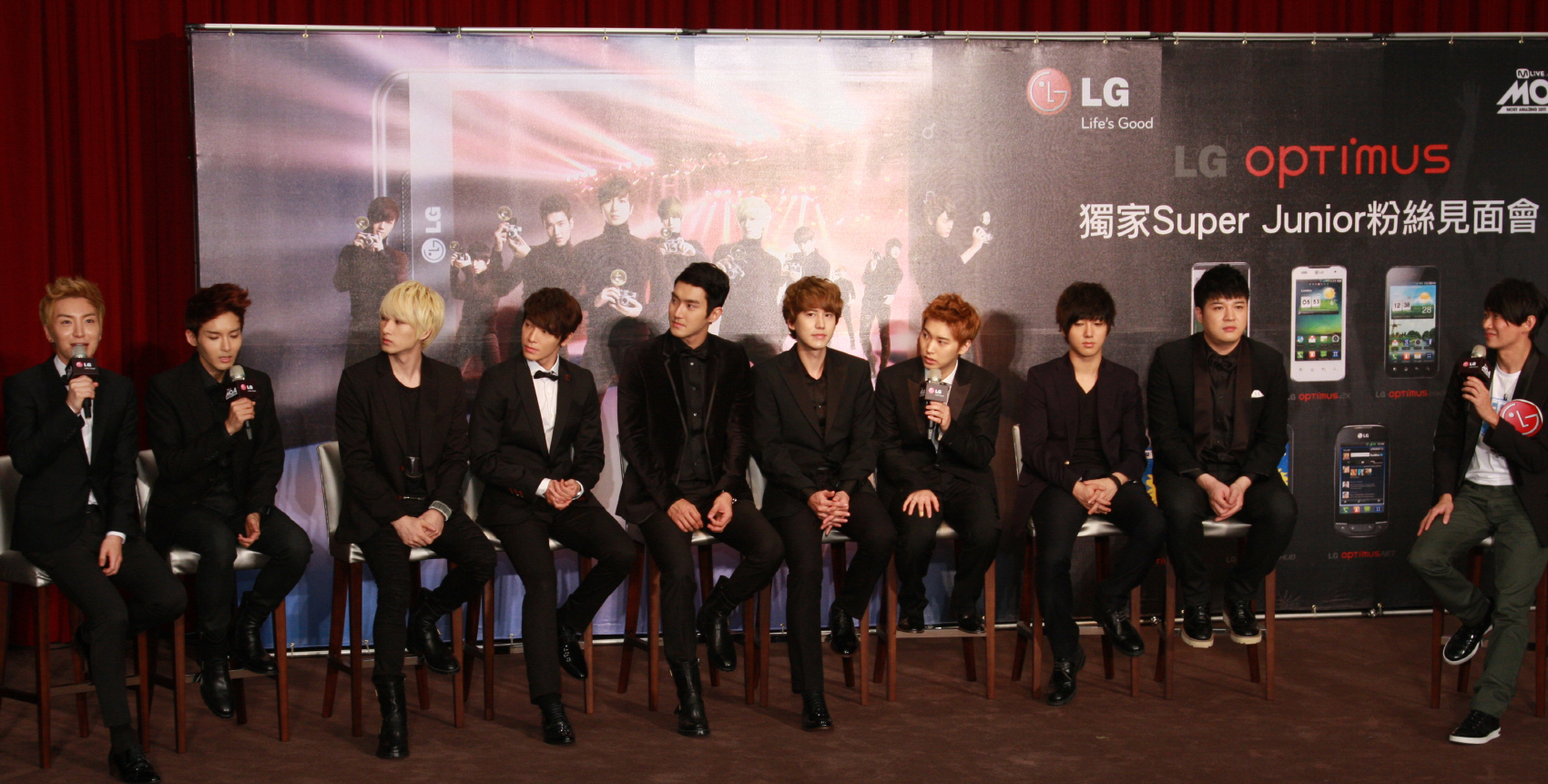
Super Junior scored two number-one albums while its subgroup Super Junior-M also earned a number one.

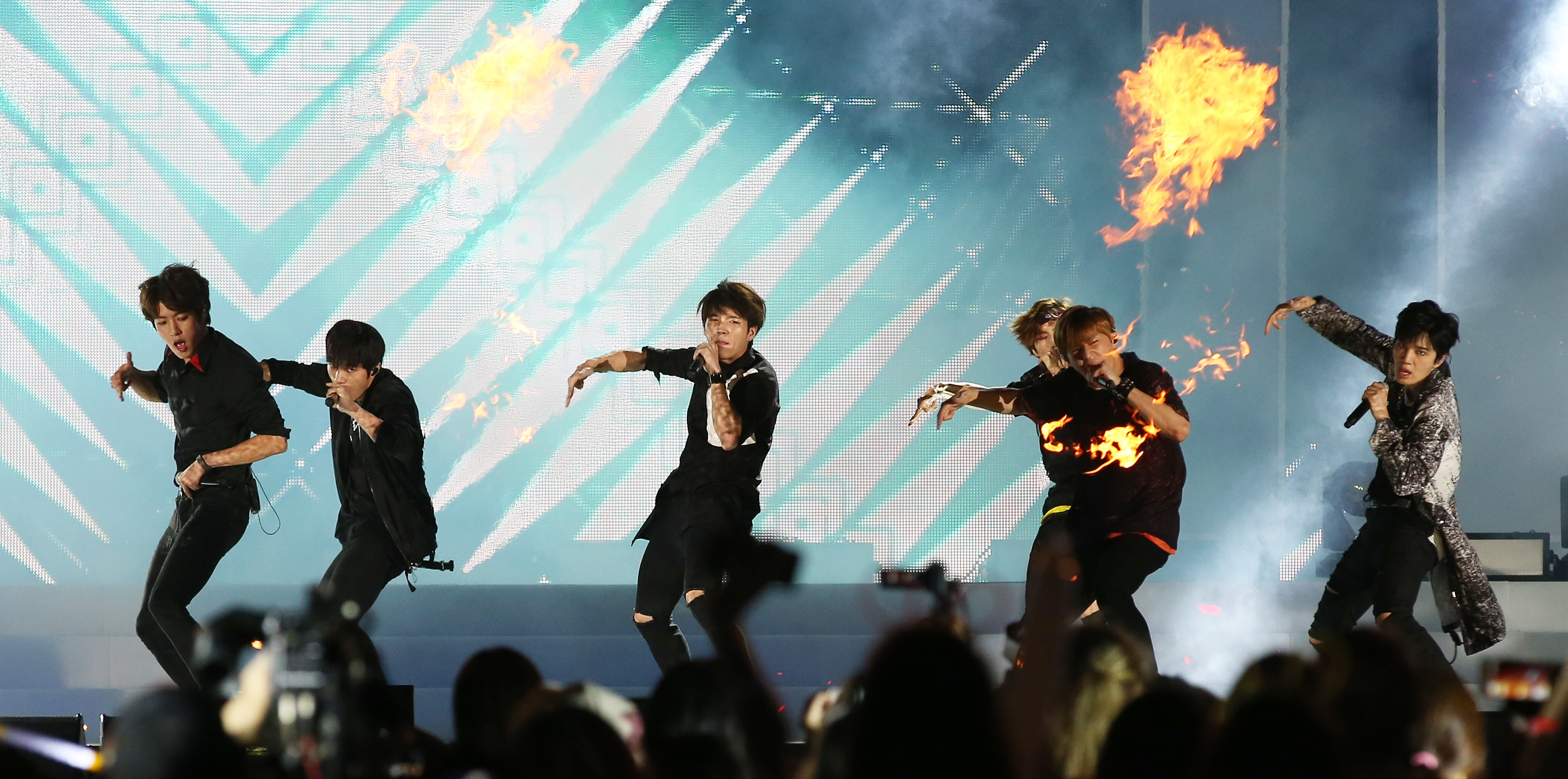
Infinite achieved two number-one albums, while its subgroup Infinite F also scored a number one.

Week	Album	Artist	Ref.
December 28, 2013 (Note: This week was counted as the first week of 2014 by Gaon Music Chart.)	Musical December 2013 with Kim Junsu	Xia	
January 4	Rain Effect	Rain	
January 11	Tense	TVXQ	
January 18	Who Am I	B1A4	
January 25	WWW	Jaejoong	
February 1	Who Am I	B1A4	
February 8	First Sensibility	B.A.P	
February 15	SM the Ballad Vol. 2 – Breathe	SM the Ballad	
February 22	Beep Beep	BtoB	
March 1	Mr.Mr.	Girls' Generation	
March 8	Mr.Mr.	Girls' Generation	
March 15	1st Mini Album	Toheart	
March 22	Can't Stop	CNBlue	
March 29	Broken	MBLAQ	
April 5	Swing	Super Junior-M	
April 12	Play	AKMU	
April 19	Jackpot (Special Edition)	Block B	
April 26	Skool Luv Affair	BTS	
May 3	XOXO Repackage (Korean Version)	Exo	
May 10	Overdose (Korean Version)	Exo-K	
May 17	Skool Luv Affair (Special Addition)	BTS	
May 24	Season 2	Infinite	
May 31	Eternity	VIXX	
June 7	Season 2	Infinite	
June 14	Rise	Taeyang	
June 21	Good Luck	Beast	
June 28	Got Love	Got7	
July 5	Good Luck	Beast	
July 12	Red Light	f(x)	
July 19	Solo Day	B1A4	
July 26	Be Back	Infinite	
August 2	Just Us	JYJ	
August 9	Just Us	JYJ	
August 16	2014 S/S	Winner	
August 23	Ace	Taemin	
August 30	Ace	Taemin	
September 6	Mamacita	Super Junior	
September 13	Mamacita	Super Junior	
September 20	Holler	Girls' Generation-TTS	
September 27	Éxito	Teen Top	
October 4	Move	BtoB	
October 11	Japan Best 'All About'	F.T. Island	
October 18	Error	VIXX	
October 25	Time	Beast	
November 1	This Is Love	Super Junior	
November 8	This Is Love	Super Junior	
November 15	At Gwanghwamun	Kyuhyun	
November 22	Identify	Got7	
November 29	Pink Luv	Apink	
December 6	Azure	Infinite F	
December 13	Good Boy	G-Dragon and Taeyang	
December 20	Error	VIXX	

== Monthly charts ==
Month	Album	Artist	Sales
January	Tense	TVXQ	194,198
February	First Sensibility	B.A.P	91,053
March	Mr.Mr.	Girls' Generation	70,295
April	The Origin	Infinite	29,950
May	Overdose (Korean Version)	Exo-K	390,034
June	Good Luck	Beast	88,800
July	Just Us	JYJ	126,115
August	Ace	Taemin	70,632
September	Mamacita	Super Junior	237,646
October	This Is Love	Super Junior	114,216
November	At Gwanghwamun	Kyuhyun	56,481
December	Exology Chapter 1: The Lost Planet	Exo	78,946
