= Pdogg =

South Korean record producer (born 1983)

Pdogg 피독
- Born: Kang Hyo-won; September 19, 1983 (age 43); South Korea
- Origin: Changwon, South Korea
- Occupations: Record producer; songwriter
- Label: Big Hit

Korean name
- Hangul: 강효원
- RR: Gang Hyowon
- MR: Kang Hyowŏn

Kang Hyo-won (Korean: 강효원; born September 19, 1983), known professionally as Pdogg (Korean: 피독), is a South Korean record producer and songwriter for Big Hit Music. He has produced and composed for artists such as 8Eight, Baek Ji-young, BTS, Jo Kwon, and Lim Jeong-hee, among others.

== Biography and career ==
In 2007, at age 25, Pdogg established a relationship with Big Hit Entertainment's CEO Bang Si-hyuk—Bang managed an online composing community where Pdogg uploaded some of his own musical compositions. The music was well received, and Pdogg's tracks "Come Back" and "Love" were included on co-ed group 8Eight's debut studio album, The First, and Lim Jeong-hee's third studio album, Before I Go, J-Lim, respectively—both albums were released that same year. In 2010, with the help of rapper Sleepy, Pdogg discovered a young RM, around whom the formation of boy group BTS later began, and brought him to Big Hit. He eventually became the group's main producer.

At the Korea Music Copyright Awards held in February 2019, Pdogg was honoured by the Korea Music Copyright Association (KOMCA) and awarded the daesang as the highest-earning songwriter and composer of 2018. He consecutively won the award between 2019 and 2023, having earned the most royalties for songwriting and composition out of all Korean composers and lyricists. In November 2020, due to his major contribution to BTS' musical career, an episode of Immortal Songs: Singing the Legend was dedicated to his songs.

== Discography ==
=== Collaborations ===
==== As featured artist ====
Title	Year	Other artist(s)
"Sai"	2007	8Eight & Ye-eun & Sunye
"Love"	2007	Lim Jeong-hee

== Production discography ==
All music credits are adapted from the KOMCA database.

Year	Artist	Album	Notes
2007	8Eight	The First	with composer Bang Si-hyuk
2007	Lim Jeong-hee	Before I Go J-Lim	with composer Bang Si-hyuk
2011	Lee Hyun	You Are the Best of My Life	
2011	Teen Top	Roman	
2013	BTS	2 Cool 4 Skool	with composer Bang Si-hyuk
2013	BTS	O!RUL8,2?	with composer Bang Si-hyuk
2014	BTS	Skool Luv Affair	
2014	BTS	Skool Luv Affair Special Addition	
2014	BTS	Dark & Wild	
2014	BTS	Wake Up	
2015	BTS	The Most Beautiful Moment in Life, Part 1	
2015	BTS	The Most Beautiful Moment in Life, Part 2	
2016	BTS	The Most Beautiful Moment in Life: Young Forever	
2016	BTS	Youth	
2016	BTS	Wings	
2016	Suga	Agust D	
2017	BTS	You Never Walk Alone	
2017	BTS	Love Yourself 承 Her	
2018	BTS	Face Yourself	
2018	BTS	Love Yourself 轉 Tear	
2018	BTS	Love Yourself 結 Answer	
2018	J-Hope	Hope World	
2019	BTS	Map of the Soul: Persona	
2019	TXT	The Dream Chapter: Star	
2019	TXT	The Dream Chapter: Magic	
2020	BTS	Map of the Soul: 7	
2020	BTS	Map of the Soul: 7 ~The Journey~	
2020	TXT	Minisode1: Blue Hour	
2020	Suga	D-2	
2020	BTS	Be	
2021	TXT	Still Dreaming	
2022	BTS	Proof	
2022	J-Hope	Jack in the Box	
2022	RM	Indigo	
2023	Jimin	Face	
2023	Suga	D-Day	
2023	Enhypen	Orange Blood	
2024	Nayeon	Na	
2024	J-Hope	Hope on the Street Vol. 1	
2024	RM	Right Place, Wrong Person	
2024	Jimin	Muse	
2024	Jin	Happy	
2025	Illit	Almond Chocolate	
2026	BTS	Arirang	

== Awards and nominations ==
Name of the award ceremony, year presented, category, nominee(s) of the award, and the result of the nomination
Award ceremony	Year	Category	Nominee(s)/work(s)	Result	Ref.
Asia Artist Awards	2018	Best Producer Award	Himself	Won	
Gaon Chart Music Awards	2017	Composer of the Year	Himself	Won	
Grammy Awards	2023	Album of the Year	Music of the Spheres (as producer)	Nominated	
Korea Music Copyright Awards	2019	Grand Prize	Himself	Won	
Korea Music Copyright Awards	2020	Grand Prize	Himself	Won	
Korea Music Copyright Awards	2021	Grand Prize	Himself	Won	
Korea Music Copyright Awards	2022	Grand Prize	Himself	Won	
Korea Music Copyright Awards	2023	Grand Prize	Himself	Won	
Mnet Asian Music Awards	2017	Best Producer of the Year	Himself	Won	
Mnet Asian Music Awards	2018	Best Producer of the Year	Himself	Won	
Mnet Asian Music Awards	2019	Best Producer of the Year	Himself	Won	
Mnet Asian Music Awards	2020	Best Producer of the Year	Himself	Won	
