= The Most Beautiful Moment in Life On Stage Tour =

2015–16 concert tour by BTS

2015 BTS Live "The Most Beautiful Moment in Life On Stage"
- Continental tour by BTS
- Associated album: The Most Beautiful Moment in Life, Pt. 1, Pt. 2
- Start date: November 27, 2015
- End date: March 23, 2016 (Note: "The Most Beautiful Moment in Life On Stage" section of the tour ended on March 23, 2016; however a separately named extension, called "The Most Beautiful Moment in Life On Stage: Epilogue" was eventually added.)
- Legs: 1
- No. of shows: 8

BTS concert chronology
- 2015 BTS Live Trilogy Episode II: The Red Bullet (2015); 2015 BTS Live "The Most Beautiful Moment in Life On Stage" (2015); 2016 BTS Live "The Most Beautiful Moment in Life On Stage: Epilogue" (2016)

The Most Beautiful Moment in Life On Stage Tour, also known as the 2015 BTS Live "The Most Beautiful Moment in Life On Stage", was the third concert tour headlined by South Korean boy band BTS to promote their The Most Beautiful Moment in Life series, including their EPs The Most Beautiful Moment Life, Pt.1, Pt. 2 (2015) and the compilation album The Most Beautiful Moment in Life: Young Forever (2016). The tour began on November 27, 2015, in South Korea. An extension to the tour, titled 2016 BTS Live "The Most Beautiful Moment in Life On Stage: Epilogue" began in South Korea on May 7, 2016. In all, the entire tour attracted over 182,500 spectators at 13 cities in 7 countries.

== Background ==
On September 8, 2015, BTS released a 12-minute-long trailer titled "The Most Beautiful Moment in Life On Stage: Prologue" on YouTube followed by a poster released September 14, 2015, announcing the tour with listed dates for three shows held at the SK Olympic Handball Gymnasium in South Korea. An additional two dates at the Yokohama Arena and two dates at the Kobe World Memorial Hall in Japan were later added and sold out, prompting the listing of a third date at the World Memorial Hall for December 28, 2015. During the tour, BTS canceled their December 27 and December 28 concerts in Kobe due to complaints of dizziness by Suga and V during rehearsals that led to medical evaluation at a local hospital. The two concerts were later rescheduled for March 22 and 23, 2016.

== Setlist ==
The following set list is obtained from the show on November 27, 2015, in Seoul, South Korea. It is not intended to represent all dates throughout the tour.

1. "Hold Me Tight"
2. "Let Me Know"
3. "Danger"
4. "No More Dream"
5. "N.O"
6. "Converse High"
7. "24/7=Heaven"
8. "Miss Right"
9. "Moving On"
10. "Run"
11. "Butterfly"
12. "Tomorrow"
13. "Hip Hop Lover"
14. "2nd Grade"
15. "Boyz with Fun"
16. "Dope"
17. "Intro: Skool Luv Affair"
18. "War of Hormone"
19. "Boy in Luv"

Encore

1. "Intro: Never Mind"
2. "Ma City"
3. "I Need U"

== Tour dates ==
List of tour dates
Date	City	Country	Venue	Attendance
November 27, 2015	Seoul	South Korea	SK Olympic Handball Gymnasium	13,500
November 28, 2015	Seoul	South Korea	SK Olympic Handball Gymnasium	13,500
November 29, 2015	Seoul	South Korea	SK Olympic Handball Gymnasium	13,500
December 8, 2015	Yokohama	Japan	Yokohama Arena	25,000
December 9, 2015	Yokohama	Japan	Yokohama Arena	25,000
December 26, 2015	Kobe	Japan	World Memorial Hall	—N/a
March 22, 2016	Kobe	Japan	World Memorial Hall	—N/a
March 23, 2016	Kobe	Japan	World Memorial Hall	—N/a

== Epilogue extension ==
2016 BTS Live "The Most Beautiful Moment in Life On Stage: Epilogue"
- Extended tour by BTS
- Associated album: The Most Beautiful Moment in Life: Young Forever
- Start date: May 7, 2016
- End date: August 14, 2016
- Legs: 1
- No. of shows: 14
- Attendance: 144,000

BTS concert chronology
- 2015 BTS Live "The Most Beautiful Moment in Life On Stage" (2015); 2016 BTS Live "The Most Beautiful Moment in Life On Stage: Epilogue" (2016); 2017 BTS Live Trilogy Episode III: The Wings Tour (2017)

=== Background ===
On March 21, 2016, following the release of their first Korean compilation album The Most Beautiful Moment in Life: Young Forever, BTS released a trailer on YouTube and a poster announcing the Most Beautiful Moment in Life On Stage: Epilogue tour extension along with a career landmark show at the Olympic Gymnastics Arena in South Korea. The tour began on May 7, 2016, and continued through the summer in nine other cities in Taiwan, China, Japan, the Philippines and Thailand, bringing together a total of 144,000 spectators. During the concert held in Beijing on July 23, RM suffered a heat stroke and did not participate for the rest of the performances that night.

=== Setlist ===
The following set list is obtained from the show on May 7, 2016, in Seoul, South Korea. It is not intended to represent all dates throughout the tour.

1. "Run"
2. "Danger"
3. "Autumn Leaves"
4. "Tomorrow"
5. "Butterfly"
6. "Love Is Not Over"
7. "Outro: House of Cards"
8. "Intro: What Am I to You"
9. "Boy in Luv"
10. "Save Me"
11. "Fire"
12. "Hip Hop Lover"
13. "We Are Bulletproof Pt.2"
14. "BTS Cypher Pt.3: Killer"
15. "If I Ruled the World"
16. "Silver Spoon"
17. "Dope"
18. "Ma City"
19. "Boyz with Fun"
20. "Attack on Bangtan"
21. "Intro: 2 Cool 4 Skool"
22. "No More Dream"

Encore

1. "Epilogue: Young Forever"
2. "Whalien 52"
3. "Miss Right"
4. "I Need U"

=== Tour dates ===
List of tour dates
Date	City	Country	Venue	Attendance
May 7, 2016	Seoul	South Korea	Olympic Gymnastics Arena	25,000
May 8, 2016	Seoul	South Korea	Olympic Gymnastics Arena	25,000
June 9, 2016	New Taipei City	Taiwan	Xinzhuang Gymnasium	8,000
June 18, 2016	Macau	China	Studio City Event Center	6,000
July 2, 2016	Nanjing	China	Wutaishan Sports Center	6,000
July 12, 2016	Osaka	Japan	Osaka-jō Hall	44,000
July 13, 2016	Osaka	Japan	Osaka-jō Hall	44,000
July 15, 2016	Nagoya	Japan	Nippon Gaishi Hall	44,000
July 16, 2016	Nagoya	Japan	Nippon Gaishi Hall	44,000
July 23, 2016	Beijing	China	Capital Indoor Stadium	9,000
July 30, 2016	Pasay	Philippines	SM Mall of Asia Arena	20,000
August 6, 2016	Bangkok	Thailand	Indoor Stadium Huamark	20,000
August 13, 2016	Tokyo	Japan	Yoyogi National Gymnasium	26,000
August 14, 2016	Tokyo	Japan	Yoyogi National Gymnasium	26,000
Total				144,000

=== Accolades ===
List of accolades
Year	Organization	Award	Result	Ref.
2017	Kazz Awards	2016 BTS Live "The Most Beautiful Moment in Life On Stage: Epilogue" in Bangkok	Nominated	
