= Dark & Wild =

Studio album by BTS
- Released: August 20, 2014
- Recorded: 2014
- Genres: Hip hop; R&B
- Length: 51:32
- Languages: Korean; English
- Labels: Big Hit; Loen; Pony Canyon
- Producers: Pdogg; Suga; Slow Rabbit; Supreme Boi; "Hitman" Bang; Shawn; Lee Ho-hyoung; SiMo

BTS chronology
Skool Luv Affair (2014)	Dark & Wild (2014)	Wake Up (2014)

Singles from Dark & Wild
- 1. "Danger" Released: August 19, 2014; 2. "War of Hormone (호르몬 전쟁)" Released: October 21, 2014

Dark & Wild (stylized DARK&WILD) is the debut studio album of South Korean boy band BTS. It was released by Big Hit Entertainment on August 20, 2014. The album contains fourteen tracks, with "Danger" as its lead single. The third track on the album, "War of Hormone", was later promoted as a secondary single.

== Background and release ==
On July 30, 2014, Big Hit Entertainment launched a countdown clock on BTS' official website, and on August 5, they uploaded a comeback trailer on YouTube which featured contrasting scenes. One scene from the trailer featured a forest paradise, while another showed black and white abandoned structures accompanied by lyrics from a Rap Monster verse. On August 7, 2014, the company released the first teaser photos and the concept photo for the new album. BTS also released a B-side song titled "Let Me Know" for free streaming, which was composed and produced by Suga. The company later released the album's tracklist on the group's official Facebook and Twitter pages. It confirmed that there were 14 tracks, with "Danger" circled in red, indicating that it was the title song. Big Hit Entertainment later released two music video teasers for the lead single "Danger". BTS also later released an audio preview of their album on the group's SoundCloud page which featured short excerpts from the tracks that made up the album with harder hip-hop tracks, R&B sounds and electronica elements interspersed. On October 21, BTS released 19 concept photos of the follow-up song "War of Hormone" through their official Facebook page and Twitter account. The teaser for the remix of "Danger" was released on November 13, as a result of collaboration with Vietnamese singer Thanh Bùi.

During production of the album, BTS recorded their single "Danger" in a makeshift studio in a garage in Los Angeles.

== Music videos ==
On August 19, 2014, the music video for "Danger" was released on 1theK's YouTube Channel. It featured the group dressed in black performing with sharp choreography in a subway tunnel, and in a warehouse with burning shopping carts.

The music video for "War of Hormone" was published on YouTube on October 21, ahead of BTS' follow-up promotions. The music video showed the boys dressed in retro outfits and dancing at an outdoor set and in a subway station. Zanybros produced the "War of Hormone" music video.

For both "Danger" and "War of Hormone," the band danced to choreography that was created by Son Sungdeuk. One month later, the remixed version of the "Danger" music video, a collaboration with a Vietnamese singer and songwriter Thanh Bùi, was released. The "Danger" music video was produced and directed by Lumpens and GDW.

== Composition ==
The album served as a narrative extension of the "school trilogy" and a transition into their next series. Musically, the album fused the grungy electric guitar sounds of rock within the framework of hip-hop and continued to expand their sound towards R&B. The central theme of the album's lyrics focused on expressing the sentiments of maturing, youthful desires, and impatience for romance.

== Promotions ==
BTS held a press conference and comeback showcase on August 19, 2014, performing "Danger", "War of Hormone", and "Let Me Know". The group later continued with their promotion of the album on various South Korean music programs starting on August 21, while performing the lead single "Danger". The follow-up promotion of the album with "War of Hormone" on October 23 started right after the release of its music video on YouTube, during their concert tour. On October 17, the group held the first half of BTS Live Trilogy Episode II: The Red Bullet concert tour for the promotion of the album at AX-Korea as the first venue and ended on December 20 in Bangkok.

Some listeners responded to the song "War of Hormone" by saying it was misogynist. The band's agency then released an apology about the song, stating that the members felt remorse for anything that could have been interpreted as objectification or misogyny.

== Commercial performance ==
Dark & Wild debuted at number two in South Korea on the Gaon Gaon Weekly Album Chart issue for the third week of August 2014. It went on to sell 51,655 copies by the end of that month and peaked at number three on the Gaon Monthly Chart for August. According to Gaon's year-end album chart for 2014, Dark&Wild was the 14th best-selling album of the year, having sold 100,906 cumulative copies.

The album also entered various Billboard charts in the United States, ranking at numbers 3 and 27 on the World Albums and Top Heatseekers charts respectively. This marked the second time that a BTS release charted on Billboard's album rankings. Both of the album's singles entered the World Digital Songs chart: "Danger" peaked at number 7 on the issue dated September 6, while "War of Hormone" peaked at number 11 on the issue dated November 8. The album went on to spend 11 non-consecutive weeks on the World ranking.

Dark&Wild won a Bonsang in the Album Division at the 29th Golden Disc Awards in January 2015.

== Track listing ==
All song credits are adapted from the Korea Music Copyright Association's database, unless otherwise noted.

No.	Title	Writer(s)	Producer	Length
1.	"Intro: What Am I to You"	Pdogg; RM	Pdogg	2:45
2.	"Danger"	Pdogg; Thanh Bui; "Hitman" Bang; RM; Suga; J-Hope	Pdogg	4:05
3.	"호르몬 전쟁" (Horeumon Jeonjaeng / War of Hormone)	Pdogg; Supreme Boi; RM; Suga; J-Hope	Pdogg	4:26
4.	"힙합성애자" (Hiphapseong-aeja / Hip Hop Lover)	Pdogg; RM; Suga; J-Hope	Pdogg	4:17
5.	"Let Me Know"	Suga; Pdogg; RM; J-Hope	Suga; Pdogg	4:15
6.	"Rain"	Slow Rabbit; RM; Suga; J-Hope	Slow Rabbit	4:25
7.	"BTS Cypher Pt. 3: Killer" (featuring Supreme Boi)	Supreme Boi; RM; Suga; J-Hope	Supreme Boi	4:28
8.	"Interlude:뭐해" (Interlude: Mwohae / Interlude: What Are You Doing)		Slow Rabbit	0:42
9.	"핸드폰 좀 꺼줄래" (Haendeupon jom kkeojullae / Can You Turn Off Your Phone)	Pdogg; RM; Suga; J-Hope	Pdogg	3:54
10.	"이불킥" (I-bul Kik / Blanket Kick)	"Hitman" Bang; Shawn; Slow Rabbit; Pdogg; RM; Suga; J-Hope	"Hitman" Bang; Shawn; Pdogg	4:02
11.	"24/7=Heaven"	Pdogg; Slow Rabbit; RM; Suga; J-Hope	Pdogg	3:46
12.	"여기 봐" (Yeogi bwa / Look Here)	Lee Ho Hyoung; Jinbo; RM; Suga; J-Hope	Lee Ho Hyoung	3:39
13.	"2학년" (I-hangnyeon / 2nd Grade)	Supreme Boi; RM; Suga; J-Hope; Pdogg	Pdogg	3:55
14.	"Outro: 그게 말이 돼?" (Outro: Geuge mari dwae? / Outro: Does that make sense?)	SiMo; Supreme Boi	SiMo; Supreme Boi	2:53
Total length:				51:32

== Charts ==
=== Weekly charts ===
Weekly chart performance
Chart (2014–2022)	Peak position
Belgian Albums (Ultratop Flanders)	170
Belgian Albums (Ultratop Wallonia)	171
South Korean Albums (Gaon)	2
Slovak Albums (ČNS IFPI)	97
UK Independent Albums (Official Charts)	36
US Top Heatseekers	27
US World Albums (Billboard)	3

=== Monthly charts ===
Monthly chart performance
Chart (2014)	Peak position
South Korean Albums (Gaon)	3

=== Year-end charts ===
Year-end chart performance
Chart (2014)	Position
South Korean Albums (Gaon)	14
Chart (2015)	Position
South Korean Albums (Gaon)	68
Chart (2016)	Position
South Korean Albums (Gaon)	74
Chart (2017)	Position
South Korean Albums (Gaon)	82
Chart (2018)	Position
South Korean Albums (Gaon)	67
Chart (2019)	Position
South Korean Albums (Gaon)	73
Chart (2021)	Position
South Korean Albums (Gaon)	87

== Sales ==
Chart	Sales
South Korea (Gaon)	424,658

== Release history ==
Country	Date	Format	Label
South Korea	August 20, 2014	CD; Digital download	Big Hit Entertainment; LOEN Entertainment
Various	August 20, 2014	Digital download	Big Hit Entertainment; LOEN Entertainment
Taiwan	November 21, 2014 (Taiwan edition)	CD; Digital download	Big Hit Entertainment; CJ E&M; Universal Music Group
Taiwan	March 8, 2015 (Taiwan limited edition)	CD; Digital download	Big Hit Entertainment; CJ E&M; Universal Music Group
Japan	March 18, 2015 (Japan edition)	CD	Big Hit Entertainment; Pony Canyon

== See also ==
- List of K-pop songs on the Billboard charts
- List of K-pop albums on the Billboard charts
- Golden Disk Awards
