= Running Wild (Jin song) =

Single by Jin

from the EP Happy
- Language: English
- Released: November 15, 2024
- Length: 2:31
- Label: Big Hit
- Songwriters: Gary Barlow; Jacob Attwooll; Josh Record; Ryan Carline
- Producers: Carline; Attwooll; Record

Jin singles chronology
"I'll Be There" (2024)	"Running Wild" (2024)	"Falling" (2024)

Music video
- "Running Wild" on YouTube

"Running Wild" is a song by South Korean singer Jin of BTS for his debut extended play, Happy. It was released as the EP's lead single on November 15, 2024, through Big Hit Music.

== Track listing ==
- CD single
1. "Running Wild" – 2:31
- CD single – instrumental
1. "Running Wild" – 2:31
2. "Running Wild" (instrumental) – 2:31
- Digital download and streaming – remixes
1. "Running Wild" – 2:31
2. "Running Wild" (instrumental) – 2:31
3. "Running Wild" (extended version) – 3:34
4. "Running Wild" (band version) – 2:43
5. "Running Wild" (ballad remix) – 2:23
6. "Running Wild" (holiday remix) – 2:33
7. "Running Wild" (afropop remix) – 2:29
8. "Running Wild" (UK garage remix) – 2:42

== Charts ==
=== Weekly charts ===
Weekly chart performance
Chart (2024–2025)	Peak position
Bolivia (Billboard)	23
Canada Hot 100 (Billboard)	68
Global 200 (Billboard)	5
Hong Kong (Billboard)	3
Indonesia (ASIRI)	30
Japan Hot 100 (Billboard)	24
Japan Combined Singles (Oricon)	45
Lithuania (AGATA)	27
Lithuania Airplay (TopHit)	88
Malaysia International (RIM)	6
New Zealand Hot Singles (RMNZ)	6
Peru (Billboard)	20
Philippines Hot 100 (Billboard)	9
San Marino Airplay (SMRTV Top 50)	42
Singapore (RIAS)	2
South Korea (Circle)	69
Taiwan (Billboard)	14
UAE (IFPI)	1
UK Singles (OCC)	25
US Billboard Hot 100	53

=== Monthly charts ===
Monthly chart performance
Chart (2024)	Position
South Korea (Circle)	169

== Release history ==
"Running Wild" release history
Region	Date	Format	Version	Label	Ref.
Various	November 15, 2024	Digital download; streaming	Original	Big Hit	
United States	November 15, 2024	CD single	Original	Big Hit	
United States	November 15, 2024	CD single	Original; instrumental	Big Hit	
Various	November 19, 2024	Digital download; streaming	Remixes	Big Hit	
Italy	December 13, 2024	Radio airplay	Original	Universal	
