= 2 Cool 4 Skool =

Single album by BTS
- Released: June 12, 2013
- Recorded: 2013
- Genre: hip-hop
- Length: 27:13
- Languages: Korean; English
- Labels: Big Hit Entertainment; Loen; Pony Canyon
- Producers: Pdogg; "Hitman" Bang; Slow Rabbit; Supreme Boi; Rap Monster; J-hope; Suga

BTS chronology
2 Cool 4 Skool (2013)	O!RUL8,2? (2013)

Singles from 2 Cool 4 Skool
- 1. "No More Dream" Released: June 11, 2013; 2. "We Are Bulletproof pt. 2" Released: July 16, 2013

2 Cool 4 Skool is the debut single album released by South Korean boy band BTS on June 12, 2013, through Big Hit Entertainment and distributed by Loen. The album was supported by the singles "No More Dream" and "We Are Bulletproof Pt.2". Commercially, it peaked at number five on the Gaon Album Chart in South Korea, and at number ten on Billboard's World Albums Chart in the United States. The album has sold over 430,000 copies as of January 2022.

A 3-disc version of the album was released in Japan through Pony Canyon in 2014.

== Background and release ==
Prior to BTS' debut, Big Hit Entertainment ran a blog for the group where the members shared mixtapes, diary entries, video logs, and various other content with their fans. The label announced a temporary closure of the blog on May 20, 2013, in preparation for the group's debut. BTS' official website was launched that same day and featured a countdown timer on the homepage—counting down to May 27 (KST)—with the group's official logo revealed for the first time. On May 26 (May 27 at 8AM KST), a 30-second long debut trailer was posted on the website and uploaded to Big Hit's official YouTube channel as well. The clip featured a hip-hop beat with Scratching and a "well-crafted rap hook" that accompanied typography graphics containing hints about the group's composition, the songs that would be on their first album, and the musical direction BTS would pursue. The timer on the website changed and began counting down to June 3. On June 3, the release date for the album and its as-yet-unnamed lead single, as well as the start date for promotional activities was announced as June 12. Teaser photos of the individual members were published on the group's website beginning that same day and continued sequentially until June 5. Big Hit revealed the tracklist for the album on their official Twitter account. They also released the design and details of the physical album, which included with a photobook and postcard. The first teaser, revealing that "No More Dream" would be their title track. Additional concept photos for the album were released via their official Facebook page the following week.

== Music videos ==
The music video for "No More Dream" was released on June 12, 2013 ahead of BTS debut showcase. "No More Dream" dance version was later released on June 16, 2013 in the middle of the group's promotion on music programs. The music video for "We Are Bulletproof Pt.2" was then released on July 16, 2013 for the group's further follow-up promotions. All the dance was choreographed by Son Sungdeuk while both "No More Dream" and "We Are Bulletproof Pt.2" music videos were directed by Zanybros.

== Composition ==
The lyrics of the album primarily reflected on the misunderstanding and prejudice towards them, criticism of the society that diminishes their dreams, and their anxiety and determination towards their future. During the production of the album, Suga and Rap Monster rewrote the lyrics of "No More Dream" more than 20 times.

== Promotions ==
BTS held a press conference and debut showcase on June 12, 2013, performing "No More Dream" and "We Are Bulletproof Pt.2". The group's debut stage on June 13 on Mnet's M Countdown marked the beginning of promotions for the album on various South Korea music programs. In 2015, BTS held a special concert in support of the album. 2015 BTS Live Trilogy Episode I: BTS Begins was held for two days at Olympic Hall starting from March 28, 2015, with BTS performing songs from the 2 Cool 4 Skool and O!RUL8,2? albums.

== Commercial performance ==
2 Cool 4 Skool sold 760 copies in its release week, and debuted at number 19 on the Week 25 issue of the Gaon Album Chart for the period dated June 9 to 15, 2013. The album went on to sell a cumulative 4,986 copies in the weeks following, and debuted at number 17 on the monthly Album Chart for June. Six weeks later, it peaked at number five on the Week 31 chart issue for the period dated July 21 to 27, during "We Are Bulletproof Pt.2" promotions, and subsequently rose to a new peak on the monthly chart for July at number 10, with a further 13,598 copies sold. The album sold a modest 24,441 copies in total and earned a placement on Gaon's year-end album chart for 2013 at number 65. In April 2020, the album made its debut on the Billboard World Albums Chart—fans purchased the album as part of an in-fandom April Fools' Day joke that anticipated "the 'debut' of a 'new' boy band called BTS coming on April 1"—at number 12, with 1,000 equivalent album units sold during the week ending April 2. According to Billboard, 2 Cool 4 Skool had earned 68,000 units in the United States as of April 11.

The album's lead single "No More Dream" also debuted on the Week 25 issues (for the same period as above) of Gaon's Digital and Download charts at numbers 124 and 84 respectively, with 23,237 sales. In the US, it debuted at number 14 on the Billboard World Digital Song Sales chart issue dated June 29, 2013, and spent three consecutive weeks on the ranking. In 2020, the single also reentered the chart, on the issue dated April 11, at a new peak of number two, with an additional 1,000 copies sold— its best single sales week on the ranking—and became the best-selling K-pop song in the US that week. According to Billboard, "No More Dream" had sold a total of 45,000 copies in the country up to that point. The single re-peaked at number one on the chart issue dated December 30, 2023, 10 years after release.

== Track listing ==
Adapted from the Korea Music Copyright Association database, unless otherwise noted.

No.	Title	Writer(s)	Producer	Length
1.	"Intro: 2 Cool 4 Skool (Note: samples "Touch Steps/Two Beat Turn/Freestyle Routine" by K-tel, from Let's Disco (1978). Its usage is a throwback to "Go" by Epik High, from their album Map of the Human Soul (2003), which also samples the same bit.)" (featuring DJ Friz)		Supreme Boi	1:03
2.	"We Are Bulletproof Pt.2"	Pdogg; "Hitman" Bang; Supreme Boi; Rap Monster; Suga	Pdogg	3:45
3.	"Skit: Circle Room Talk"		Pdogg	2:11
4.	"No More Dream"	Pdogg; "Hitman" Bang; Rap Monster; Suga; J-Hope; Supreme Boi	Pdogg	3:42
5.	"Interlude"		Slow Rabbit	0:52
6.	"좋아요" (Joayo / I Like It / Like)	Slow Rabbit; Rap Monster; Suga; J-Hope	Slow Rabbit	3:51
7.	"Outro: Circle Room Cypher"	Rap Monster; J-Hope; Suga; V; Jimin; Jungkook; Jin; Pdogg	Pdogg	5:21
Total length:				20:45

Physical album
No.	Title	Writer(s)	Producer	Length
8.	"Skit: On the Start Line"	Rap Monster	"hitman" bang	2:33
9.	"길" (Gil / Path)	Rap Monster; J-Hope; Suga; "hitman" bang; Pdogg	Rap Monster; J-Hope; Suga; "hitman" bang; Pdogg	3:48
Total length:				27:06

== Personnel ==
- BTS – vocals
  - Rap Monster – producer, songwriter, chorus
  - Suga – producer, songwriter, recording
  - J-Hope – producer, songwriter
  - Jungkook – chorus
- Pdogg – producer, recording, keyboard, synthesizer, vocal and rap arrangement
- "Hitman" Bang – producer, songwriter, executive producer
- Slow Rabbit – producer, songwriter, recording, keyboard, synthesizer
- Supreme Boi – producer, recording, keyboard, synthesizer, chorus
- DJ Scratch – scratching
- Yang Chang Won – mixing, recording
- James F. Reynolds – mixing
- Nam Young Woo – recording
- Chris Gehringer – mixing
- Choi Hyo Young – mixing

== Charts ==
=== Weekly charts ===
Weekly chart performance for 2 Cool 4 Skool
Chart (2013)	Peak position
Belgian Albums (Ultratop Flanders)	174
South Korean Albums (Gaon)	5
Chart (2020)	Peak position
US World Albums (Billboard)	12

=== Monthly charts ===
Monthly chart performance for 2 Cool 4 Skool
Chart (2013)	Peak position
South Korean Albums (Gaon)	10

=== Year-end charts ===
Year-end chart performance for 2 Cool 4 Skool
Chart (2013)	Position
South Korean Albums (Gaon)	65
Chart (2014)	Position
South Korean Albums (Gaon)	106
Chart (2015)	Position
South Korean Albums (Gaon)	96
Chart (2016)	Position
South Korean Albums (Gaon)	90
Chart (2017)	Position
South Korean Albums (Gaon)	98
Chart (2018)	Position
South Korean Albums (Gaon)	85
Chart (2019)	Position
South Korean Albums (Gaon)	76
Chart (2021)	Position
South Korean Albums (Gaon)	90

== Sales ==
Sales for 2 Cool 4 Skool
Region	Certification	Certified units/sales
South Korea (Gaon)	—	446,265
United States (Billboard)	—	68,000

== Release history ==
Country	Date	Format	Label	Ref
South Korea	June 12, 2013	CD, digital download	Big Hit Entertainment; LOEN Entertainment	
Various	June 12, 2013	Digital download	Big Hit Entertainment; LOEN Entertainment	

== See also ==
- List of K-pop songs on the Billboard charts
- List of K-pop albums on the Billboard charts
- List of K-pop songs on the World Digital Song Sales chart
- New artist awards received by BTS
