= Wake Up (BTS album) =

2014 studio album by BTS

- Regular and digital editions cover

Studio album by BTS
- Released: December 24, 2014
- Genre: Dance-pop; hip hop; R&B
- Length: 49:44
- Language: Japanese; English
- Label: Pony Canyon
- Producer: Pdogg

BTS chronology
Dark & Wild (2014)	Wake Up (2014)	The Most Beautiful Moment in Life, Pt. 1 (2015)

Singles from Wake Up
- 1. "No More Dream (Japanese Ver.)" Released: June 4, 2014; 2. "Boy in Luv (Japanese Ver.)" Released: July 16, 2014; 3. "Danger (Japanese Ver.)" Released: November 19, 2014

Wake Up is the first Japanese and second overall studio album by South Korean boy band BTS. It was released in Japan on December 24, 2014, through Pony Canyon. The 13-track album includes Japanese versions of the band's Korean singles "No More Dream", "Boy in Luv", and "Danger"—all of which were released in the months prior as physical Japanese singles—and two new, original Japanese songs: "The Stars" and "Wake Up". The album became BTS' highest-charting and best-selling album in Japan at the time, following its debut at number three on the Oricon Albums Chart, and sales of over 28,000 copies.

== Editions ==
- Limited Edition Type A (PCCA-4137): The limited edition features, along with the standard track list of the album, a video clip of BTS' first official fan meeting in Japan at the Tokyo Dome City Hall, and a campaign lottery ticket.
- Limited Edition Type B (PCCA-4138): The limited edition features, along with the standard track list of the album, a DVD with their Japanese music videos, and a campaign lottery ticket.
- Regular Edition (PCCA-4139): The regular edition includes the CD only and a random photo card.
- Clear Vinyl (PCJA-00153): Special edition to commemorate the 10th anniversary of BTS' debut in Japan.

== Releases ==
Three songs from the album were released as singles:

The first and debut single, a Japanese version of the song "No More Dream", was released on June 4, 2014. It peaked at number eight in Oricon's weekly chart, selling more than 34,000 copies. Type A, Type B, and a regular edition of the single was released and also included a Japanese version of "Attack on Bangtan" ("進撃の防弾"), while the regular edition included an additional Japanese version of "Like" ("いいね!").

The second single, a Japanese version of the song "Boy In Luv", was released on July 16, 2014. It peaked at number four in Oricon's weekly chart. It has sold for more than 44,000 copies. Type A, Type B, and a regular edition of the single was released and also included a Japanese version of "N.O", while the regular edition included an additional Japanese version of "Just One Day".

The third and final single, a Japanese version of the song "Danger", was released on November 19, 2014. It peaked at number five in Oricon's weekly chart, selling 49,124 copies in its first week. Type A, Type B, and a regular edition of the single was released and also included a Japanese SONPUB remix version of "Attack on Bangtan" ("進撃の防弾"), while the regular edition included an additional Japanese version of "Miss Right".

== Promotion ==
BTS 1st Japan Tour 2015 "Wake Up: Open Your Eyes"
- Japan tour by BTS
- Associated album: Wake Up (BTS album)
- Start date: 10 February 2015
- End date: 19 February 2015
- No. of shows: 6

BTS concert chronology
- 2014 BTS Live Trilogy Episode II: The Red Bullet (2014); BTS 1st Japan Tour 2015 "Wake Up: Open Your Eyes" (2015); 2015 BTS Live Trilogy Episode II: The Red Bullet (2015)

For the promotion of their debut Japanese studio album, BTS embarked on their first Japanese concert tour titled BTS 1st Japan Tour 2015 "Wake Up: Open Your Eyes". They toured Chiba, Osaka, Nagoya, and Fukuoka from February 10 to February 19, 2015, attracting more than 25,000 spectators.

=== Shows ===
Date	City	Prefecture	Venue	Attendance
February 10, 2015	Chiba	Chiba	Makuhari Messe Event Hall	25,000
February 11, 2015	Chiba	Chiba	Makuhari Messe Event Hall	25,000
February 13, 2015	Osaka	Osaka	Festival Hall	25,000
February 14, 2015	Osaka	Osaka	Festival Hall	25,000
February 17, 2015	Nagoya	Aichi	Zepp Nagoya	25,000
February 19, 2015	Fukuoka	Fukuoka	Zepp Fukuoka	25,000

== Commercial performance ==
Wake Up debuted on the daily Oricon Albums Chart, two days prior to its official release on the 24th, at number three with 2,715 copies sold. It peaked at number two the following day with an additional 9,428 copies sold. At the end of its first tracking week, the album debuted at number three—BTS' highest peak in Japan—on the Weekly Albums chart issue dated January 5, 2015, for the period December 22–28 with an accumulated 21,192 copies sold. This also put it at number 19 on the Monthly Albums chart for December. The album spent 13 weeks on the Oricon chart, and went on to sell over 28,000 copies, making it BTS' best-selling album in Japan at the time.

== Track listing ==
Credits adapted from the liner notes of the physical album.

Standard track listing
No.	Title	Writer(s)	Producer(s)	Length
1.	"Intro"	Shingo Suzuki	Shingo Suzuki	1:15
2.	"The Stars"	KM-Markit; Rap Monster; Suga; J-Hope; Pdogg	KM-Markit	4:16
3.	"Jump" (Japanese version)	Suga; Pdogg; Supreme Boi; Rap Monster; J-Hope	Suga; Pdogg; Supreme Boi	3:56
4.	"Danger" (Japanese version)	Pdogg; Thanh Bui; Rap Monster; Suga; J-Hope; KM-Markit	Pdogg	4:05
5.	"Boy in Luv" (Japanese version)	Pdogg; "Hitman" Bang; Rap Monster; Suga; Supreme Boi; KM-Markit	Pdogg	3:50
6.	"Just One Day" (extended Japanese version)	Pdogg; Rap Monster; Suga; J-Hope	Pdogg	5:34
7.	"いいね!" (Ī ne! / I Like It!)	Slow Rabbit; Rap Monster; Suga; J-Hope	Slow Rabbit	3:51
8.	"いいね！Pt.2～あの場所で～" (Ī ne! Pt. 2 ~ Ano basho de ~ / I Like It Pt.2 ~In That Place~)	Slow Rabbit; Rap Monster; Suga; J-Hope	Slow Rabbit; Pdogg	3:55
9.	"No More Dream" (Japanese version)	Pdogg; "Hitman" Bang; Rap Monster; Suga; J-Hope; Supreme Boi	Pdogg	3:42
10.	"進撃の防弾" (Shingeki no bōdan / Attack on Bangtan)	Pdogg; Rap Monster; Suga; J-hope	Pdogg	4:07
11.	"N.O" (Japanese version)	Pdogg; "Hitman" Bang; Rap Monster; Suga; Supreme Boi	Pdogg	3:30
12.	"Wake Up"	Swing-O; Rap Monster; Suga; J-hope; KM-Markit	Swing-O	5:52
13.	"Outro"	Shingo Suzuki; Rap Monster	Shingo Suzuki	1:36
Total length:				49:29

Type A DVD
No.	Title	Length
1.	"Japan Official Fan Meeting Vol.1 at Tokyo Dome City Hall" (2014年5月に行われた日本ファンミーティング時の映像数曲収録予定)	14:32

Type B DVD
No.	Title	Length
1.	"No More Dream" (music video)	4:50
2.	"Boy in Luv" (music video)	4:42
3.	"Danger" (music video)	4:46
4.	"Danger" (dance edit, bonus clip)	4:13
Total length:		18:31

== Release history ==
Country	Date	Format	Label	Ref.
Japan	December 24, 2014	CD; DVD	Pony Canyon	
Japan	December 24, 2014	Digital download; streaming	Pony Canyon	
South Korea	February 26, 2015	Digital download; streaming	Big Hit; LOEN	
Japan	December 25, 2024	Vinyl LP	Pony Canyon	
