= O!RUL8,2? =

EP by BTS
- Released: September 11, 2013
- Recorded: 2013
- Genres: Hip hop; R&B
- Length: 30:36
- Languages: Korean; English
- Labels: Big Hit; Loen; Pony Canyon
- Producers: Pdogg; "Hitman" Bang; Slow Rabbit; Supreme Boi

BTS chronology
2 Cool 4 Skool (2013)	O!RUL8,2? (2013)	Skool Luv Affair (2014)

Singles from O!RUL8,2?
- 1. "N.O" Released: September 11, 2013

O!RUL8,2? (Oh! Are you late, too?) is the first extended play by South Korean boy band BTS. It was released on September 11, 2013 as the second album after 2 Cool 4 Skool. The album consists of ten tracks, with "N.O" (also known as "No Offense") as the lead single. The group later promoted "Attack On Bangtan (진격의 방탄)", another track from the album.

== Background and release ==
On August 27, 2013 Big Hit Entertainment launched a countdown clock on BTS official website and uploaded a comeback trailer on YouTube in preparation for O!RUL8,2? and comeback promotions. It featured a monologue by Rap Monster as different 3D images related to BTS floated in space before shattering into the ground and starts off with a voice-over narration that talks about how one should pursue his or her dream. Three days later, they revealed the O!RUL8,2? track list and concept photo of the album on their official Twitter account and Facebook page. They also released the design and details of the physical album, along with its photobook, photocard and poster. Big Hit Entertainment then released a special trailer for the album's concept. They later released the first teaser, revealing that "N.O" would be the lead single. On September 8, 2013, BTS dropped an audio preview prior to the actual release of the album.

== Music video ==
The music video for the lead track, "N.O" (an acronym for "no offense"), was released on September 10, one day before the release of the album. The music video featured the members dressed in uniforms, and rebelling against their teacher in what appears to be a dystopian classroom. Their dance was choreographed by Son Sungdeuk and the music video was directed by Zanybros.

== Composition ==
Musically, BTS did not fundamentally change their sound as compared with 2 Cool 4 Skool, utilizing fiery rapping along with trap beats, brass, and soulful melodies. Lyrically, the EP expanded on the theme of dreams and happiness, revealing their frustration under the harsh Korean education system and their determination to confront the struggle of proving themselves.

== Promotions ==
BTS made their comeback with "N.O" on September 12, 2013, on Mnet's M Countdown music program. The group went on to promote on KBS's Music Bank, MBC's Music Core, SBS's Inkigayo and Arirang TV's Simply K-Pop. In November 2013, BTS proceeded with follow-up promotion of the album with "Attack on Bangtan" on various South Korea music programs. Much later in 2015, BTS held a special concert in support of the album. 2015 BTS Live Trilogy Episode I: BTS Begins was held for two days at Olympic Hall starting from March 28, 2015, with BTS performing songs from 2 Cool 4 Skool and O!RUL8,2?.

== Commercial performance ==
O!RUL8,2? debuted at number four on the Gaon Weekly Chart in the second week of September 2013. The album also debuted at number 11 on the September Gaon Monthly Chart. It was ranked the 55th best-selling album of South Korea on the Gaon Album Chart in 2013. As of 2019, it has sold over 200,000 copies.

== Track listing ==
All song credits are adapted from the Korea Music Copyright Association's database, unless otherwise noted.

No.	Title	Writer(s)	Producer	Length
1.	"Intro : O! RUL8,2"	Pdogg; RM	Pdogg	1:11
2.	"N.O"	Pdogg; "Hitman" Bang; RM; Suga; Supreme Boi	Pdogg	3:30
3.	"We On"	Pdogg; RM; Suga; J-Hope	Pdogg	3:51
4.	"Skit: R U Happy Now?"		Pdogg	2:28
5.	"If I Ruled the World"	Pdogg; RM; Suga; J-Hope	Pdogg	4:07
6.	"Coffee"	Urban Zakapa; Pdogg; RM; Slow Rabbit; Suga; J-Hope	Pdogg; Slow Rabbit	4:20
7.	"BTS Cypher Pt.1"	Supreme Boi; RM; Suga; J-Hope	Supreme Boi	2:11
8.	"진격의 방탄" (Jingyeogui Bangtan / Attack On Bangtan)	Pdogg; RM; Suga; J-Hope; Supreme Boi	Pdogg	4:07
9.	"팔도강산" (Paldogangsan / Satoori Rap)	Pdogg; RM; Suga; J-Hope	Pdogg	3:25
10.	"Outro: Luv in Skool"	Slow Rabbit; Pdogg	Slow Rabbit; Pdogg	1:26
Total length:				30:36

== Charts ==
=== Weekly charts ===
Weekly chart performance
Chart (2013–2026)	Peak position
Belgian Albums (Ultratop Flanders)	171
Belgian Albums (Ultratop Wallonia)	194
Portuguese Albums (AFP)	182
South Korean Albums (Gaon)	4
Swiss Albums (Schweizer Hitparade)	66
US World Albums (Billboard)	6

=== Monthly charts ===
Monthly chart performance
Chart (2013)	Peak position
South Korean Albums (Gaon)	11

=== Year-end charts ===
Year-end chart performance
Chart (2013)	Position
South Korean Albums (Gaon)	55
Chart (2014)	Position
South Korean Albums (Gaon)	92
Chart (2015)	Position
South Korean Albums (Gaon)	87
Chart (2016)	Position
South Korean Albums (Gaon)	86
Chart (2017)	Position
South Korean Albums (Gaon)	99
Chart (2018)	Position
South Korean Albums (Gaon)	82
Chart (2019)	Position
South Korean Albums (Gaon)	81
Chart (2021)	Position
South Korean Albums (Gaon)	85

== Sales and certifications ==
Chart	Sales
South Korea (Gaon)	319,951

== Release history ==
Country	Date	Format	Label
South Korea	September 11, 2013	CD, Digital download	Big Hit Entertainment; LOEN Entertainment
Various	September 11, 2013	Digital download	Big Hit Entertainment; LOEN Entertainment

== See also ==
- New artist awards received by BTS
