= Skool Luv Affair =

EP by BTS
- Released: February 12, 2014
- Recorded: 2014
- Genres: Hip hop; R&B; dance-pop; pop
- Length: 35:30 (Skool Luv Affair); 43:17 (Skool Luv Affair Special Addition)
- Languages: Korean; English
- Labels: Big Hit; Loen; Pony Canyon
- Producers: Pdogg; Kwon Dae Hee; Cream; Suga; Slow Rabbit; Supreme Boi; OWO; Brother Su

BTS chronology
O!RUL8,2? (2013)	Skool Luv Affair (2014)	Dark & Wild (2014)

Repackaged edition cover
- Skool Luv Affair Special Addition artwork

Singles from Skool Luv Affair
- 1. "Boy in Luv (상남자)" Released: February 12, 2014; 2. "Just One Day (하루만)" Released: April 6, 2014

Professional ratings
Review scores
Source	Rating
AllMusic	3.5/5 stars

Skool Luv Affair is the second extended play by South Korean boy band BTS. The ten-track album was released by Big Hit Entertainment on February 12, 2014, with "Boy in Luv" as its lead single. Two music videos, including a choreography only version, accompanied the single's release. A second single, "Just One Day", was promoted in April. Four different music videos were subsequently released in support of the song.

A limited edition repackage of the album, Skool Luv Affair Special Addition, was released on May 14, 2014. The physical copy of the repackage contained eighteen tracks, including two new songs: "Miss Right" and "I Like It (Slow Jam Remix)", and six instrumentals. After its initial release sold out, the repackage remained out of print for six years. Big Hit made the album available for purchase once again in October 2020, due to popular demand.

== Background and release ==
On January 26, 2014, Big Hit Entertainment released a countdown clock on BTS's official website and uploaded a comeback trailer on February 2 on YouTube in preparations for this album and comeback promotions. It featured a colorful array of animations flashing on the screen, accompanied by RM's rap. Three days later, Big Hit Entertainment released the track list and concept photo for BTS's upcoming album on their official Twitter account and Facebook page. They also released the design and details of the physical album which would be accompanied with its photobook and photocard. They released an album preview a day later, revealing that "Boy in Luv" would be their lead single. Big Hit Entertainment released one track, "Just One Day," on February 6, 2014 for free pre-streaming ahead of BTS's comeback. They released an MV teaser of the song much later on April 2.

=== Promotion ===
BTS held a press conference and comeback showcase on February 11, 2014, and performed "Boy in Luv" and "Jump" for the first time. The band began music show promotions on February 13. "Boy In Luv" received a first place nomination on the February 23 episode of SBS's Inkigayo. They held their first fan meeting, BTS Global Official Fanclub A.R.M.Y 1ST Muster, on March 29, and performed songs from the new album before 3,000 fans.

In April, BTS resumed music show promotions following the release of "Just One Day" on April 9.

== Music videos ==
The music video for "Boy in Luv" was released on February 11, 2014. It features the members as students, acting out various scenes that showed their interest in the female lead character (Go So-hyun). On February 20, BTS released the dance version of "Boy in Luv" in the middle of promoting on music programs.

The music video for "Just One Day (하루만)" was then released on April 6 in preparation for the group's follow-up promotions. The music video showed a lighter contrast from "Boy in Luv"; it featured the members sitting in the light and shadows as well as dancing with chairs on a white background. Various version's of the 'Just One Day' MV were released after the original version, such as the choreography version, the facial expressions version, etc.

The choreography of "Boy In Luv" was created by GRV Crew, David Lim. Both "Boy in Luv" and "Just One Day" music videos were produced and directed by Lumpens and GDW.

== Composition ==
While Skool Luv Affair musically retained much of their hip-hop influences with the incorporation of R&B and hard rock, the album coincided with a thematic shift from dreams and happiness to love, focusing on school-age and youthful love.

== Commercial performance ==
Skool Luv Affair debuted at number three on the Gaon Album Chart in South Korea, for the week ending February 8, and rose to number one two months later during "Just One Day" promotions, on the week 18 issue for the period ending April 26. The album was the 20th best-selling of 2014 on Gaon's year-end chart, with 86,004 copies sold.

In the United States, the album peaked at number three on the Billboard World Albums Chart, marking the first time a BTS album appeared on international charts. The band entered the Billboard World Digital Songs chart for the second time, with three songs from the album making it on the ranking: "Boy In Luv" and "Tomorrow" charted at numbers 5 and 24 respectively on the issue dated March 1, while secondary single "Just One Day" charted at number 25 during its promotional period the following month, on the issue dated April 26.

== Track listing ==
All song credits are adapted from the Korea Music Copyright Association's database, unless otherwise noted.

No.	Title	Writer(s)	Producer(s)	Length
1.	"Intro: Skool Luv Affair"	Pdogg; Slow Rabbit; Rap Monster; Suga; J-Hope	Pdogg	2:58
2.	"상남자" (Sangnamja; lit: Manly man / Boy In Luv)	Pdogg; "Hitman" Bang; Rap Monster; Suga; Supreme Boi	Pdogg	3:50
3.	"Skit: Soulmate"	Pdogg	Pdogg	1:32
4.	"어디에서 왔는지" (Eodieseo wanneunji / Where did you come from?)	Kwon Dae Hee; Cream; Rap Monster; Suga; J-Hope	Kwon Dae Hee; Cream	4:00
5.	"하루만" (Haruman / Just One Day)	Pdogg; Rap Monster; Suga; J-Hope	Pdogg	4:00
6.	"Tomorrow"	Suga; Slow Rabbit; Rap Monster; J-Hope	Suga; Slow Rabbit	4:22
7.	"BTS Cypher Pt. 2: Triptych"	Supreme Boi; Rap Monster; Suga; J-Hope	Supreme Boi	4:48
8.	"등골브레이커 (Note: Samples the 1975 song "Why do you call me?(왜불러)" by singer Song Chang sik.)" (Deunggolbeureikeo / Spine Breaker)	Pdogg; OWO; Rap Monster; Suga; J-Hope; Slow Rabbit; Supreme Boi; Song Chang Sik	Pdogg; OWO	3:59
9.	"Jump"	Suga; Pdogg; Supreme Boi; Rap Monster; J-Hope	Suga; Pdogg; Supreme Boi	3:57
10.	"Outro: Propose"	Slow Rabbit; Pdogg	Slow Rabbit	2:03
Total length:				35:29

Skool Luv Affair Special Addition
No.	Title	Writer(s)	Producer(s)	Length
11.	"Miss Right"	Pdogg; Slow Rabbit; "Hitman" Bang; Rap Monster; Suga; J-Hope	Pdogg	4:01
12.	"좋아요 [Slow Jam Remix]" (Joh-ayo / I Like It)	Brother Su; Pdogg; Slow Rabbit; Rap Monster; Suga; J-Hope	Brother Su; Pdogg	3:52
Total length:				43:22

Skool Luv Affair Special Addition – Physical album
No.	Title	Length
13.	"상남자" (Sangnamja; lit: Manly man / Boy In Luv, Instrumental)	3:50
14.	"어디에서 왔는지" (Eodieseo wanneunji / Where did you come from? Inst.)	4:00
15.	"하루만" (Haruman / Just One Day Inst.)	3:59
16.	"Tomorrow" (Inst.)	4:21
17.	"등골브레이커" (Deunggolbeureikeo / Spine Breaker Inst.)	3:58
18.	"Jump" (Inst.)	3:56
Total length:		1:07:21

== Charts ==
=== Weekly charts ===
Weekly chart performance
Chart (2014–2026)	Peak position
Australian Albums (ARIA)	23
Belgian Albums (Ultratop Flanders)	82
Belgian Albums (Ultratop Wallonia)	187
Croatian International Albums (HDU)	15
German Albums (Offizielle Top 100)	35
Hungarian Albums (MAHASZ)	19
New Zealand Albums (RMNZ)	33
Portuguese Albums (AFP)	158
South Korean Albums (Gaon)	1
Spanish Albums (PROMUSICAE)	38
Swiss Albums (Schweizer Hitparade)	49
UK Independent Albums (OCC)	22
US Billboard 200	12
US Top Rap Albums (Billboard)	7
US World Albums (Billboard)	3

=== Year-end charts ===
Year-end chart positions for Skool Luv Affair
Chart (2014)	Position
South Korea (Gaon)	20
Chart (2015)	Position
South Korea (Gaon)	65
Chart (2016)	Position
South Korea (Gaon)	66
Chart (2017)	Position
South Korea (Gaon)	74
Chart (2018)	Position
South Korea (Gaon)	58
Chart (2019)	Position
Hungarian Albums (MAHASZ)	61
South Korean Albums (Gaon)	62
Chart (2020)	Position
South Korean Albums (Gaon)	98
Chart (2021)	Position
South Korean Albums (Gaon)	88

== Skool Luv Affair Special Addition ==
A limited edition repackage of the album, titled Skool Luv Affair Special Addition, was announced by Big Hit on May 7, 2014. Pre-orders began the same day and the album was released on May 14. This 3-disc version contained an 18-track CD with two new songs, "Miss Right" and "I Like It (Slow Jam Remix)", followed by the original 10-song tracklist and six additional instrumentals found only on the physical album, as well as two DVDs featuring footage from BTS' showcase held in February that year and making of content. The album debuted at number one on the Week 21 issue of the Gaon Album Chart, for the period dated May 11–17, and went on to sell 14,852 cumulative copies, ending 2014 as the 98th best-selling album of the year.

After its initial pressing sold out, the album remained out of print for six years. On September 7, 2020, Big Hit announced that the repackage would be reprinted and re-released on October 13 due to the overwhelming response from the band's fandom in a survey conducted by the label in August through Weverse—data collected indicated that the Special Addition album was the number one piece of out-of-stock merchandise fans wanted made available again. Pre-orders took place from September 8 until the previously announced October release date. The album reentered Gaon's monthly album chart, ranking fourth for October, and sold 670,500 copies by the end of the year, making it the tenth best-selling album of 2020. In Japan, the album debuted at number three on the weekly Oricon Albums Chart issue post-dated October 26, with 37,689 copies sold for the period dated October 12–18. It sold 40,829 copies by the end of October and entered the monthly Albums Chart at number 10. The album ranked 89th on Oricon's annual year-end chart. In the US, the reissue debuted at number 12 on the Billboard 200 chart issue dated October 31 with 28,000 equivalent album units sold. Of this number, 26,000 were pure copies, which landed the album at number four on the Top Album Sales chart. "Boy in Luv", "Just One Day", and "Tomorrow" re-entered the World Digital Songs chart, for the same issue date, and achieved new peaks at numbers three, five, and seven respectively.

== Release history ==
Album	Country	Date	Format	Label
Skool Luv Affair	South Korea	February 12, 2014	CD, digital download	Big Hit Entertainment; LOEN Entertainment
Skool Luv Affair	Various	February 12, 2014	Digital download	Big Hit Entertainment; LOEN Entertainment
Skool Luv Affair Special Addition	South Korea	May 14, 2014	CD, digital download	Big Hit Entertainment; LOEN Entertainment
Skool Luv Affair Special Addition	Various	October 13, 2020	CD	Big Hit Entertainment; LOEN Entertainment

== See also ==
- List of K-pop songs on the Billboard charts
- List of K-pop albums on the Billboard charts
- List of Gaon Album Chart number ones of 2014
