= Youth (BTS album) =

Album by BTS

- Limited edition cover

Studio album by BTS
- Released: September 7, 2016
- Genres: J-pop; pop; dance-pop; hip hop; R&B
- Length: 49:06
- Languages: Japanese; English
- Label: Pony Canyon
- Producer: Pdogg

BTS chronology
The Most Beautiful Moment in Life: Young Forever (2016)	Youth (2016)	Wings (2016)

Singles from Youth
- 1. "For You" Released: June 17, 2015; 2. "I Need U (Japanese Ver.)" Released: December 8, 2015; 3. "Run (Japanese Ver.)" Released: March 15, 2016

Youth is the second Japanese-language and third overall studio album by South Korean boy band BTS, which was released on September 7, 2016, through Pony Canyon. The album features 13 tracks.

== Editions ==
Both versions have the complete track listing and a photocard came with all first edition albums.

- Album + DVD edition (PCCA-4434): This edition comes with a DVD containing "For You", "I Need U (Japanese version)", and "Run (Japanese version)" music videos.
- Regular edition (PCCA-4435): N/A

== Commercial performance ==
Youth sold 44,547 copies on its release day and topped the daily issue of the Oricon Albums Chart for September 6, 2016. It went on to sell 76,483 copies during the tracking period dated September 5–11, and debuted atop the subsequent weekly issue of the chart dated September 19. The album entered the September monthly chart at number four, with 81,763 cumulative sales, and was certified gold by the Recording Industry Association of Japan (RIAJ) shortly afterwards, denoting 100,000 physical copies sold. It was the 48th best-selling album of the year in Japan per Oricon's annual album chart for 2016.

Awards and nominations
Organization	Year	Award	Result	Ref.
Japan Gold Disc Awards	2017	Best 3 Albums in the (Asia)	Won	

== Track listing ==
All lyrics are written by KM-Markit.

No.	Title	Writer(s)	Producer	Length
1.	"Introduction: Youth"	Ryuja; RM; "Hitman" Bang; Pdogg; Suga; V; Jungkook; J-Hope; UTA; Hiro; Brother Su; Devine-Channel	Ryuja	2:16
2.	"Run" (Japanese version)	Pdogg; "Hitman" Bang; RM; Suga; V; Jungkook; J-Hope	Pdogg	3:55
3.	"Fire" (Japanese version)	Pdogg; "Hitman" Bang; RM; Suga; Devine-Channel	Pdogg	3:24
4.	"Dope" (超ヤベー) (Japanese version)	Pdogg; Ear Attack; "Hitman" Bang; RM; Suga; J-Hope	Pdogg	4:05
5.	"Good Day"	Matt Cab; Ryuja; Suga; J-Hope; RM	Matt Cab; Ryuja	4:25
6.	"Save Me" (Japanese version)	Pdogg; Ray Michael; Djan Jr; Ashton Foster; Samantha Harper; RM; Suga; J-Hope	Pdogg	3:19
7.	"フンタン少年団" (Boyz with Fun) (Japanese version)	Suga; Pdogg; "Hitman" Bang; RM; J-Hope; Jin; Jimin; V	Suga; Pdogg	4:06
8.	"ペップセ" (Baepsae) (Japanese version)	Pdogg; Supreme Boi; RM; Slow Rabbit	Pdogg	3:55
9.	"Wishing on a Star"	Matt Cab; Willie Weeks; Daisuke; RM; Suga; J-Hope	Matt Cab; Willie Weeks	4:29
10.	"Butterfly" (Japanese Ver.)	"Hitman" Bang; Slow Rabbit; Pdogg; Brother Su; RM; Suga; J-Hope	Pdogg	4:04
11.	"For You"	UTA; Hiro; RM; Suga; J-Hope; Pdogg	Pdogg	4:39
12.	"I Need U" (Japanese version)	Pdogg; "Hitman" Bang; RM; Suga; J-Hope; Brother Su	Pdogg	3:33
13.	"Epilogue: Young Forever" (Japanese version)	Slow Rabbit; RM; "Hitman" Bang; Suga; J-Hope	RM; Slow Rabbit	2:54
Total length:				49:06

DVD
No.	Title	Length
1.	"For You" (music video)
2.	"For You" (Behind the Scene -Music Video Shooting-)	4:16
3.	"I Need U" ((Japanese version) -Music Video-)	3:56
4.	"I Need U" ((Japanese version) (Behind the Scene) -Music Video Shooting-)	4:05
5.	"Run" ((Japanese version) -Music Video-)	3:50
6.	"Run" ((Japanese version) (Behind the Scene) -Music Video Shooting-)

== Certifications ==
Certifications for Youth
Region	Certification	Certified units/sales
Japan (RIAJ)	Gold	100,000^{^}
^{^} Shipments figures based on certification alone.

== Release history ==
Release history and formats for Youth
Country	Date	Format	Label
Japan	September 7, 2016	CD, digital download	Pony Canyon
