= The Most Beautiful Moment in Life =

The Most Beautiful Moment in Life is a two-part album by BTS:

- The Most Beautiful Moment in Life, Pt. 1, released in 2015
- The Most Beautiful Moment in Life, Pt. 2, released in 2015
