= The Most Beautiful Moment in Life: Young Forever =

- Day version and digital cover

Compilation album by BTS
- Released: May 2, 2016
- Recorded: 2015–16
- Genres: Hip-hop; R&B; dance-pop; pop
- Length: 98:37
- Languages: Korean; English
- Labels: Big Hit; Loen; Pony Canyon
- Producer: RM Slow Rabbit

BTS chronology
The Most Beautiful Moment in Life, Pt. 2 (2015)	The Most Beautiful Moment in Life: Young Forever (2016)	Youth (2016)

Singles from The Most Beautiful Moment in Life: Young Forever
- 1. "Epilogue: Young Forever" Released: April 19, 2016; 2. "Fire" Released: May 2, 2016; 3. "Save Me" Released: May 15, 2016

Korean title
- Hangul: 화양연화 Young Forever
- Hanja: 花樣年華 Young Forever
- RR: Hwayangyeonhwa Young Forever
- MR: Hwayangyŏnhwa Young Forever

The Most Beautiful Moment in Life: Young Forever (Korean: 화양연화 Young Forever) is the first Korean-language compilation album by South Korean boy band BTS. The album was released on May 2, 2016 in two physical configurations, a day version and a night version. The album contains twenty-three tracks, including three new singles ("Epilogue: Young Forever", "Fire" and "Save Me"), and most tracks from The Most Beautiful Moment in Life, Pt. 1 and The Most Beautiful Moment in Life, Pt. 2, as well as several remixes.

== Background and release ==
On March 21, 2016, Big Hit Entertainment announced BTS' upcoming return and a concert scheduled for May. BTS released concert teasers on April 7 on their official Twitter account as "Motion Posters". They later released concept photos on April 21 and 24, indicating that the physical album would be available in two cover designs, Day and Night. Both versions include a photobook, polaroid, mini photocard and poster. The video teaser for the concert was released on April 25. The track list was released on April 27, revealing that it would be a compilation album with a total of twenty-three tracks. They also released the design and details of the physical album. On April 29, Big Hit Entertainment released a preview for BTS' "Fire" music video, featuring the members dancing.

== Music videos ==
The "Epilogue: Young Forever" music video was released on April 19, picturing the members running in a maze full of fences as well as flashbacks to scenes from the "I Need U", "On Stage: Prologue" and "Run" videos. It was produced and directed by GDW. The music video for "Fire," the lead single from the album, was released on May 2. It featured the members dancing and partying in an abandoned place in flames. The video was produced and directed by Lumpens and GDW. Fuse stated that, "The cut feels like an upgraded version of "Dope," a standout single from The Most Beautiful Moment In Life, Part 1. The accompanying music video also sees the guys whipping out their most intense choreography to date". On May 9, BTS released the dance version of the "Fire" video ahead of their promotion on music programs. The dance was choreographed by Keone Madrid. The "Save Me" music video was released on May 15, which was notably filmed in a one-shot take. The dance was choreographed by The Quick Style Crew and the music video was also produced and directed by GDW.

== Promotion ==
On May 1, BTS held a comeback show on V Live, which received over 100 million likes during broadcast on the night of the release. They announced the Epilogue extension for The Most Beautiful Moment in Life On Stage Tour on May 7. Spanning 14 dates and visiting 9 cities, it kicked off on May 7, in Seoul, South Korea, and concluded on August 14, in Tokyo, Japan. BTS decided to promote on music shows only for a week, performing on Mnet, KBS, MBC and SBS as planned to allow for individual activities, performances and overseas schedules, starting with M! Countdown on May 12.

== Commercial performance ==
Tickets for BTS' first solo concert in 2016, BTS LIVE The Most Beautiful Moment in Life On Stage: Epilogue, sold out immediately, causing connection errors on Interpark Ticket's PC and mobile sites due to high traffic. Search keywords related to the concert topped at portal sites, as both fans and the public showed high interest. After the album and the "Fire" music video were released on May 2, "Fire" became the fastest BTS music video to reach one million views at the time in just 6 hours. The video hit 10 million views in 75 hours. The videos for "Fire" and "Save Me" ranked first and second respectively on Most Viewed K-Pop Videos in America, Around the World: May 2016 list revealed by Billboard. BTS also rose to number 15 in the artist category on YouTube Music Global Top 100.

BTS topped Billboard World Digital Songs with lead single "Fire," "Save Me," and "Epilogue: Young Forever" lining up the top three ranks of the chart, which had never been achieved by a K-pop act. "Fire" achieved an 'all-kill' on the South Korean music charts (simultaneous #1's on all charts) and received three number-one trophies on music programs while performing on M! Countdown, Music Bank and Inkigayo.

The Most Beautiful Moment in Life: Young Forever album became BTS' second consecutive release to chart on the Billboard 200, peaking at number 107, the second K-pop act to do so. It debuted at number 2 on Billboard World Albums and number 10 on Billboard Top Heatseekers. The Most Beautiful Moment in Life: Young Forever was reported to have sold over 300,000 copies in pre-sales after less than a week. According to the Hanteo Chart, 100,000 copies of the album were sold within the first three days of release, and 164,868 copies were sold within the first week. The album topped Gaon Weekly Chart for two consecutive weeks. It also topped the Gaon Monthly Chart in May with just over 310,000 albums sold and became the fourth best selling album on the yearly Gaon Album Chart of 2016. BTS received their first daesang, or "grand award", with this album—Album of The Year at the 8th Melon Music Awards in 2016. Big Hit Entertainment also shared that the unofficial combined sales of all albums from The Most Beautiful Moment in Life series would soon reach its million mark as it had already sold a total of 930,000 copies at the time.

== Accolades ==
Awards and nominations
Ceremony	Year	Award	Result	Ref.
Melon Music Awards	2016	Album of the Year	Won	
Gaon Chart Music Awards	2017	Album of the Year – 2nd Quarter	Nominated	

Select critic lists
Publication	Accolade	Rank	Ref.
Billboard	The 25 Greatest K-pop Albums of the 2010s: Staff List	3	

== Track listing ==
Credits come from official album profile.

CD 1
No.	Title	Writer(s)	Producer(s)	Length
1.	"Intro: 화양연화" (Intro: Hwayangyeonhwa / Intro: The Most Beautiful Moment in Life)	Slow Rabbit; Suga	Slow Rabbit; Suga	2:03
2.	"I Need U"	"Hitman" Bang; RM; Suga; J-Hope; Brother Su	Pdogg	3:30
3.	"잡아줘" (Jabajwo / Hold Me Tight)	Slow Rabbit; Pdogg; RM; Suga; J-Hope; 김번창; V	Slow Rabbit	4:34
4.	"고엽" (Goyeop / Autumn Leaves)	Suga; Slow Rabbit; Jungkook; "Hitman" Bang; RM; J-Hope	Suga; Slow Rabbit	4:28
5.	"Butterfly" (Prologue Mix)	"Hitman" Bang; Slow Rabbit; Brother Su	"Hitman" Bang; Slow Rabbit	4:55
6.	"Run"	Pdogg; "Hitman" Bang; RM; Suga; V; Jungkook; J-Hope	Pdogg	3:57
7.	"Ma City"	Pdogg; "Hitman" Bang; RM; Suga; J-Hope	Pdogg	4:18
8.	"뱁새" (Baepsae / Silver Spoon)	Pdogg; Supreme Boi; RM; Slow Rabbit	Pdogg	3:54
9.	"쩔어" (Jjeoreo / Dope)	Pdogg; earattack; "Hitman" Bang; RM; Suga; J-Hope	Pdogg	4:00
10.	"불타오르네 (Fire)" (Bultaoreune / Burning Up)	Pdogg; "Hitman" Bang; RM; Suga; Devine Channel	Pdogg	3:23
11.	"Save Me"	Pdogg; Ray Michael Djan Jr; Ashton Foster; Samantha Harper; RM; Suga; J-Hope	Pdogg	3:16
12.	"Epilogue: Young Forever"	Slow Rabbit; RM; "Hitman" Bang; Suga; J-Hope	RM; Slow Rabbit	2:51
Total length:				45:09

CD 2
No.	Title	Writer(s)	Producer(s)	Length
1.	"Converse High"	Pdogg; Slow Rabbit; RM; Suga; J-Hope	Pdogg; Slow Rabbit	3:29
2.	"이사" (Isa / Moving On)	Pdogg; RM; Suga; J-Hope	Pdogg	4:52
3.	"Whalien 52"	Pdogg; Brother Su; "Hitman" Bang; RM; Suga; J-Hope; Slow Rabbit	Pdogg	4:04
4.	"Butterfly"	"Hitman" Bang; Slow Rabbit; Pdogg; Brother Su; RM; Suga; J-Hope	Pdogg	4:00
5.	"House of Cards" (full-length edition)	Slow Rabbit; Brother Su; "Hitman" Bang	Slow Rabbit	3:46
6.	"Love Is Not Over" (full-length edition)	Jungkook; Slow Rabbit; Pdogg; Jin; RM; Suga; J-Hope	Jungkook; Slow Rabbit	3:42
7.	"I Need U" (Urban Mix)	Pdogg; "Hitman" Bang; RM; Brother Su	보라돌이; Slow Rabbit	3:35
8.	"I Need U" (Remix)	Pdogg; "Hitman" Bang; RM; Brother Su	Shaun	3:42
9.	"Run" (ballad mix)	Pdogg; "Hitman" Bang; RM; Suga; V; Jungkook	Slow Rabbit	4:17
10.	"Run" (alternative mix)	Pdogg; "Hitman" Bang; RM; Suga; V; Jungkook; J-Hope	Pdogg	3:56
11.	"Butterfly" (alternative mix)	"Hitman" Bang; Slow Rabbit; Pdogg; Brother Su; RM; Suga; J-Hope	Pdogg	4:01
Total length:				43:24

== Charts ==
=== Weekly charts ===
Weekly chart performance
Chart (2016–20)	Peak position
Belgian Albums (Ultratop Flanders)	118
Belgian Albums (Ultratop Wallonia)	164
Canadian Albums (Billboard)	99
Dutch Albums (Album Top 100)	189
Hungarian Albums (MAHASZ)	13
Japanese Albums (Oricon)	15
South Korean Albums (Gaon)	1
UK Independent Albums (OCC)	19
US Billboard 200	107
US Independent Albums (Billboard)	42
US World Albums (Billboard)	2

=== Monthly charts ===
Monthly chart performance
Chart (2016)	Peak position
Japanese Albums (Oricon)	17
South Korean Albums (Gaon)	1

=== Year-end charts ===
Year-end chart performance
Chart (2016)	Position
South Korean Albums (Gaon)	4
Chart (2017)	Position
South Korean Albums (Gaon)	98
Chart (2018)	Position
South Korean Albums (Gaon)	85
Chart (2019)	Position
South Korean Albums (Gaon)	43
Chart (2020)	Position
South Korean Albums (Gaon)	64
Chart (2021)	Position
South Korean Albums (Gaon)	58

== Certifications and sales ==
Region	Certification	Certified units/sales
Canada (Music Canada)	Platinum	80,000^{‡}
Denmark (IFPI Danmark)	Gold	10,000^{‡}
Japan	—	13,511
South Korea	—	1,033,652
United Kingdom (BPI)	Gold	100,000^{‡}
United States	—	6,000
^{‡} Sales+streaming figures based on certification alone.

== Release history ==
Country	Date	Format	Label
South Korea	May 2, 2016	CD, digital download	Big Hit Entertainment, Loen Entertainment
Japan	May 8, 2016	CD, digital download	Big Hit Entertainment, Loen Entertainment
Taiwan	June 1, 2016	CD	Universal Music Group

== See also ==
- List of K-pop songs on the Billboard charts
- List of K-pop albums on the Billboard charts
- List of Gaon Album Chart number ones of 2016
