= List of Gaon Album Chart number ones of 2015 =

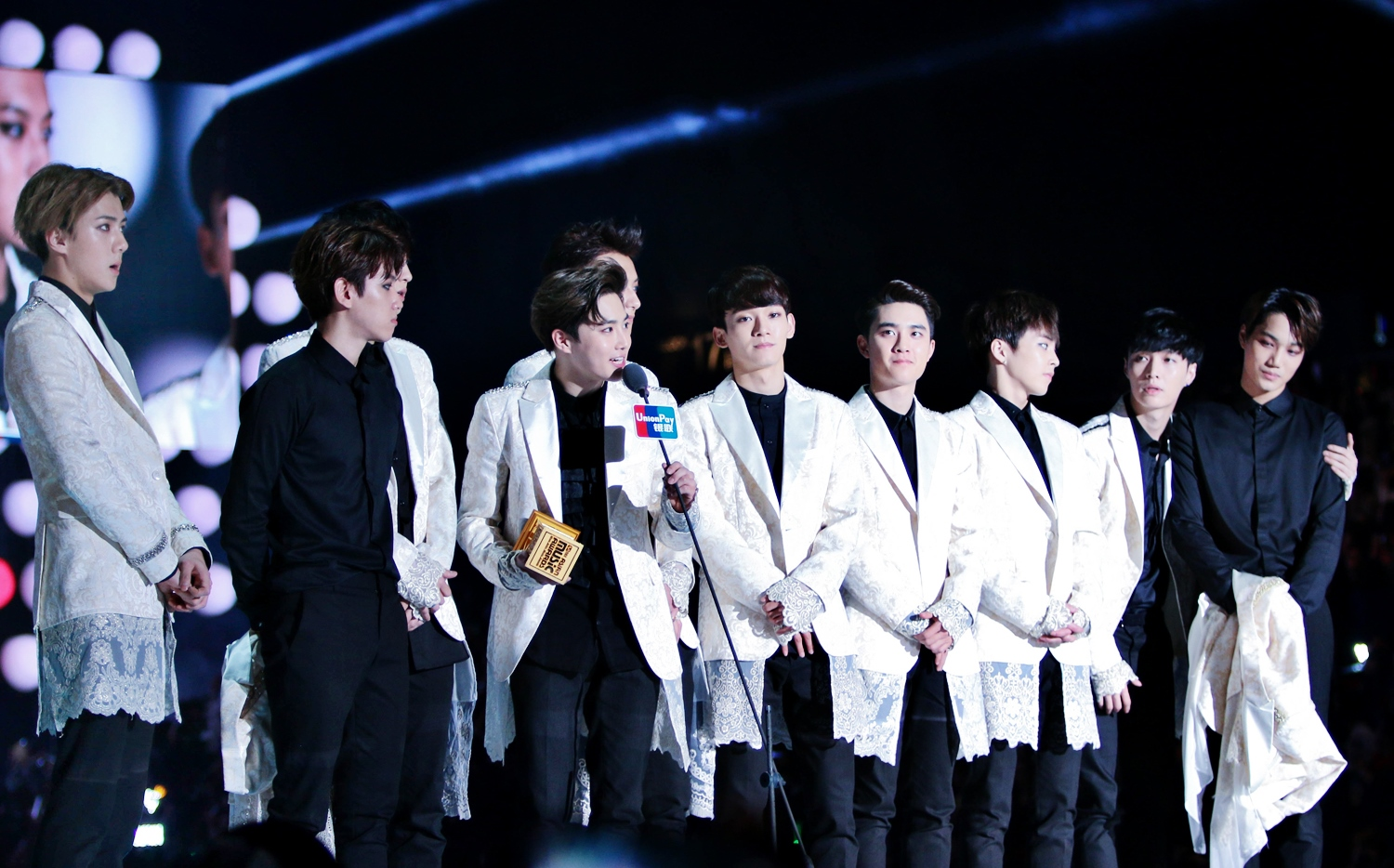
Exo's Exodus (Korean Version) album was Gaon's best selling album of 2015.

The Gaon Album Chart is a record chart that ranks the best-selling albums and EPs in South Korea. It is part of the Gaon Music Chart which launched in February 2010. The data for the chart is compiled by the Ministry of Culture, Sports and Tourism and the Korean Music Content Industry Association based on weekly and monthly physical album sales by major distributors such as LOEN Entertainment, KT Music, Sony Music Korea, Warner Music Korea, Universal Music and Mnet Media.

Overall, Exo's Exodus (Korean Version) album was Gaon's best selling album of 2015, selling 478,856 copies.

== Weekly charts ==
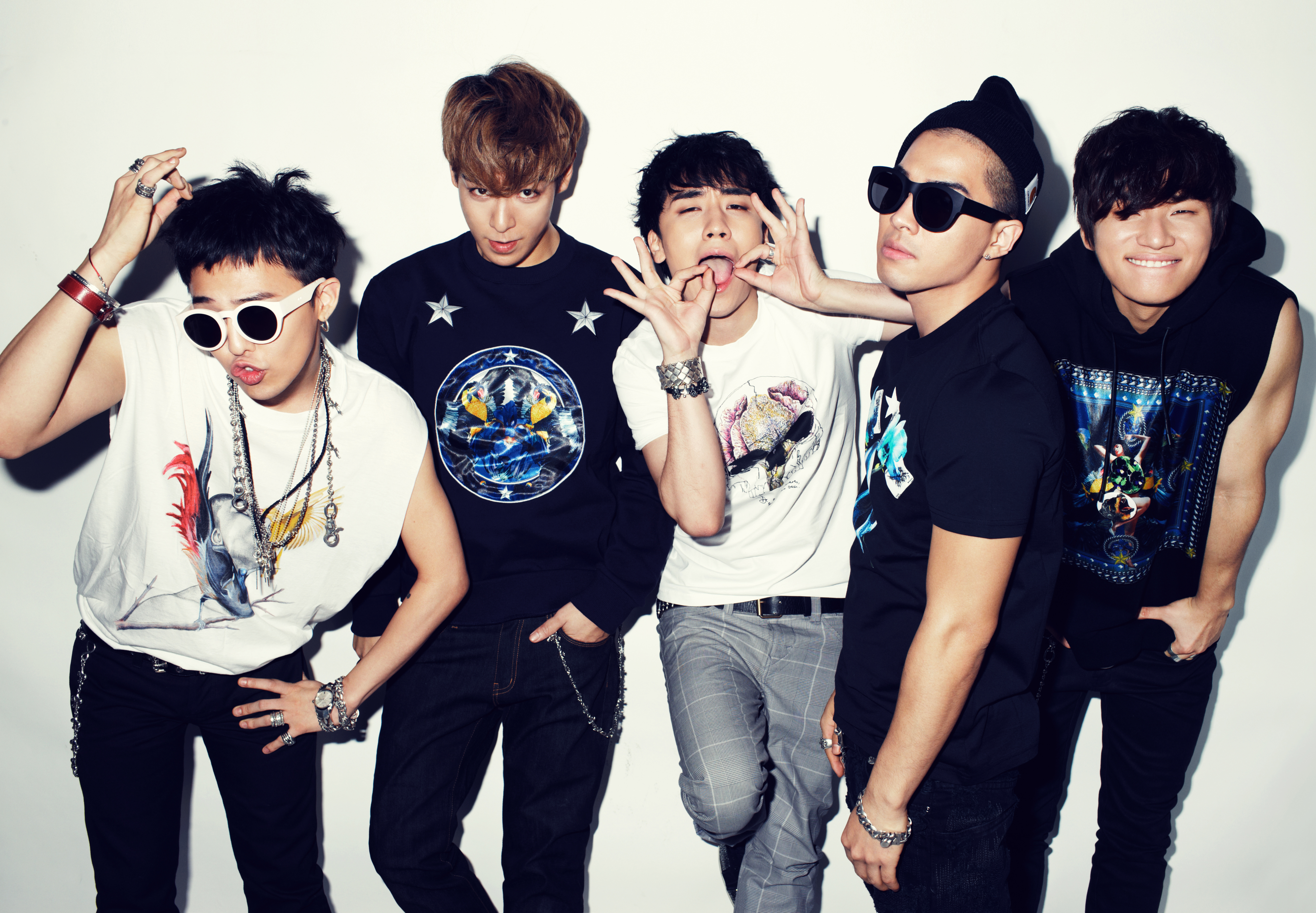

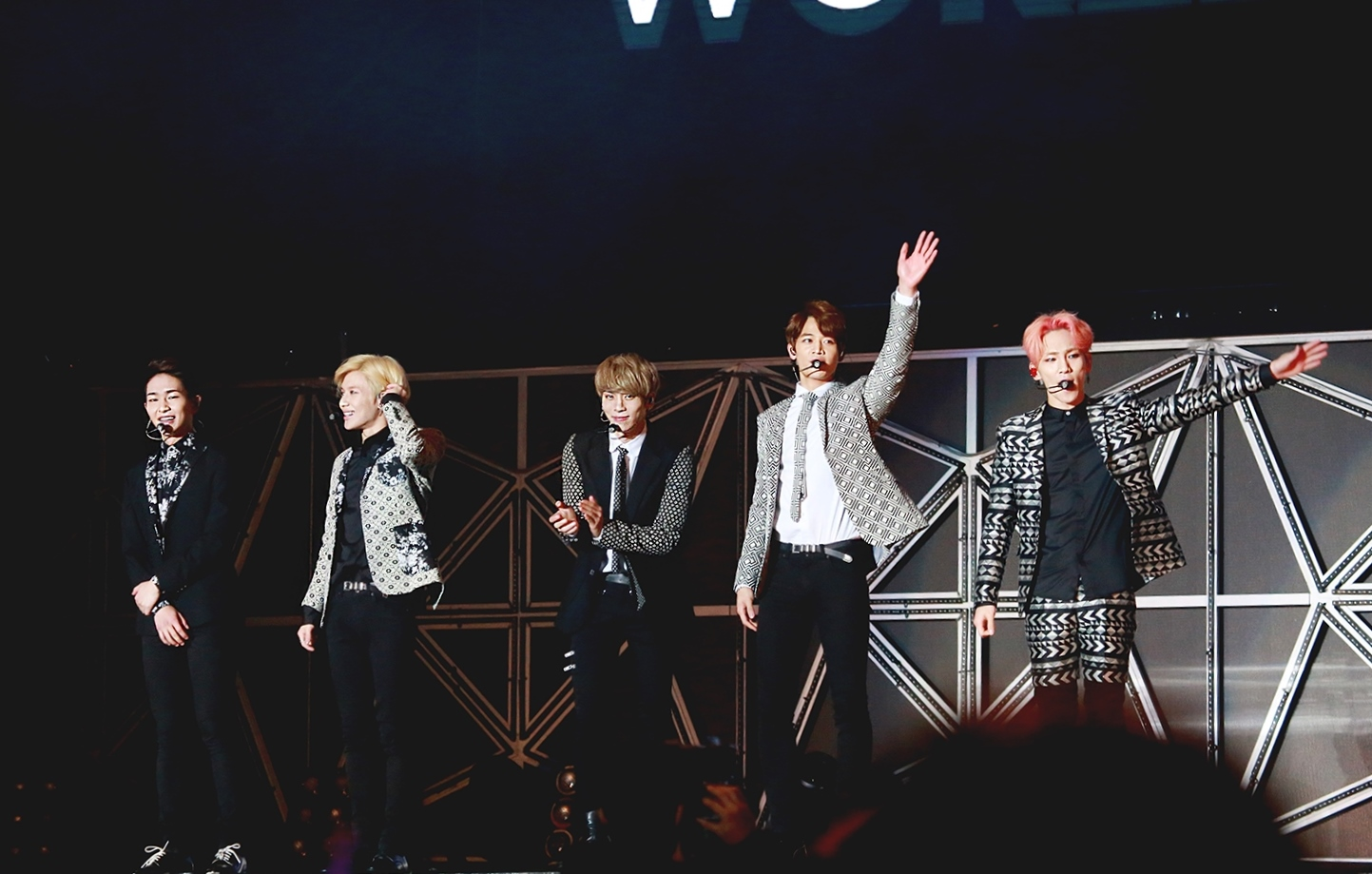
Big Bang (top) and Shinee (bottom) topped the weekly chart three times each.

Week	Album	Artist	Ref.
December 27, 2014 (Note: This week was counted as the first week of 2015 by Gaon Music Chart.)	Exology Chapter 1: The Lost Planet	Exo	
January 3	Deja Vu	Sonamoo	
January 10	The Winter's Tale	BtoB	
January 17	Base	Jonghyun	
January 24	One Fine Day	Jung Yong-hwa	
January 31	Fly Again	Infinite H	
February 7	One Fine Day	Jung Yong-hwa	
February 14	Fly Again	Infinite H	
February 21	oNIELy	Niel	
February 28	Boys' Record	VIXX	
March 7	Flower	Xia	
March 14	The Beat Goes On	Super Junior-D&E	
March 21	Ice Cream Cake	Red Velvet	
March 28	I Will	F.T. Island	
April 4	Exodus (korean ver)	Exo	
April 11	Exodus (korean ver)	Exo	
April 18	Exodus (korean ver)	Exo	
April 25	Exodus (korean ver)	Exo	
May 2	M	Big Bang	
May 9	The Most Beautiful Moment In Life, Part 1	BTS	
May 16	27	Kim Sung-kyu	
May 23	Odd	Shinee	
May 30	Odd	Shinee	
June 6	Love Me Right (Korean Version)	Exo	
June 13	Love Me Right (Korean Version)	Exo	
June 20	No.5	2PM	
June 27	Natural Born Teen Top	Teen Top	
July 4	Complete	BtoB	
July 11	D	Big Bang	
July 18	Reality	Infinite	
July 25	Rise as God	TVXQ	
August 1	Ordinary	Beast	
August 8	Married to the Music	Shinee	
August 15	E	Big Bang	
August 22	Lion Heart	Girls' Generation	
August 29	Lion Heart	Girls' Generation	
September 5	Song Il Kook's Triplets Classic	Various Artist	
September 12	The Red	Red Velvet	
September 19	Magic	Super Junior	
September 26	2gether	CNBLUE	
October 3	Mad	Got7	
October 10	Welcome Back (Half)	iKON	
October 17	Fall, Once Again	Kyuhyun	
October 24	Yesterday	Xia	
October 31	4 Walls	f(x)	
November 7	Winner Of XVII International Chopin Piano Competition	Seong-Jin Cho	
November 14	Chained Up	VIXX	
November 21	Matrix	B.A.P	
November 28	Matrix	B.A.P	
December 5	The Most Beautiful Moment In Life, Part 2	BTS	
December 12	Sing for You (korean ver)	Exo	
December 19	Sing for You (korean ver)	Exo	
December 26	Welcome Back (Full)	iKON	

== Monthly charts ==
Month	Album	Artist	Sales
January	One Fine Day	Jung Yong-hwa	75,886
February	Boys' Record	VIXX	54,997
March	Exodus (Korean Version)	Exo	277,087
April	Exodus (Korean Version)	Exo	175,782
May	Odd	Shinee	165,346
June	Love Me Right (Korean Version)	Exo	268,821
July	Rise as God	TVXQ	148,155
August	Lion Heart	Girls' Generation	131,228
September	Magic	Super Junior	90,504
October	I	Taeyeon	100,923
November	The Most Beautiful Moment In Life, Part 2	BTS	144,640
December	Sing for You (Korean Version)	Exo	318,698
