= Save Me (BTS song) =

Single by BTS

from the album The Most Beautiful Moment In Life: Young Forever and Youth
- Released: May 2, 2016
- Studio: Carrot Express
- Genre: Tropical house; electropop
- Length: 3:16
- Label: Big Hit
- Songwriters: Kang Hyo-won; Ray Michael Djan Jr; Ashton Foster; Samantha Harper; Kim Nam-joon; Min Yoon-gi; Jung Ho-seok
- Producer: Pdogg

BTS singles chronology
"Fire" (2016)	"Save Me" (2016)	"Blood Sweat & Tears" (2016)

Music video
- "Save ME" on YouTube

"Save Me" (stylized as "Save ME") is a song by South Korean boy group BTS from their compilation album The Most Beautiful Moment In Life: Young Forever (2016). The original Korean version was released by Big Hit Entertainment on May 2, 2016, and the Japanese version was released on September 7, 2016, on their album Youth, under Universal Music Japan and Virgin Music-Def Jam Recordings. The song is widely considered as one of the group’s signature songs.

== Music and lyrics ==
"Save Me" is a tropical house and electropop track. NME's Rhian Daly described it as "deceptively bright and bouncy – an aural carnival that masks the pleas for help in the lyrics." The song opens with energetic synth sound that sonically develops towards tropical house sound. The song contains a speedy rhythm and a "frenetic" chorus. Billboard described it as "powerfully subtle". Lyrically, it deals with the theme of salvation. The song was written by Pdogg, Ray Michael Djan Jr, Ashton Foster, Samantha Harper, RM, Suga, and J-Hope with Pdogg serving as the primary producer. Musically, it is in the key of D♭ major and is 140 beats per minute.

== Promotion ==
The music video for "Save Me", released in conjunction with the single was produced and directed by GDW. The music video, which was notably filmed in a one-shot take shows BTS members singing and performing intense choreography against the wind, in the backdrop of low-lying clouds that maximize the atmosphere and convey the emotions of a lyrically sad song. The dance was choreographed by The Quick Style Crew. As of February 2023, the visual has garnered over 700 million views.

BTS decided to promote on music shows only for a week, performing on Mnet, KBS, MBC and SBS as planned to allow for individual activities, performances and overseas schedules, starting with M! Countdown on May 12. The song was promoted at the 2018 MBC Plus X Genie Music Awards performances as well.

== Commercial performance ==
BTS topped Billboard World Digital Songs with "Save Me", the number 1 spot being taken by their other single "Fire". The videos for "Save Me" ranked second on Most Viewed K-Pop Videos in America, Around the World: May 2016 list revealed by Billboard.

== Credits and personnel ==
The Korean credits are adapted from the CD liner notes of The Most Beautiful Moment In Life: Young Forever.

- Pdogg – producer, keyboard, synthesizer
- "Hitman" Bang – producer
- Rap Monster – producer
- Suga – producer
- Devine Channel – producer
- Jungkook – chorus
- Slow Rabbit – vocal and rap arrangement, recording engineer @ Carrot Express
- Sam Klempner – mix engineer

== Charts ==
Chart (2016)	Peak position
Finland Download (Latauslista)	23
Philippines (Philippine Hot 100)	71
South Korea (Gaon)	19
US World Digital Songs (Billboard)	2

== Certifications and sales ==
Certifications and sales for "Save Me"
Region	Certification	Certified units/sales
South Korea	—	228,170
New Zealand (RMNZ)	Gold	15,000^{‡}
United States (RIAA)	Gold	500,000^{‡}
Streaming
Japan (RIAJ)	Gold	50,000,000^{†}
^{‡} Sales+streaming figures based on certification alone.^{†} Streaming-only figures based on certification alone.

== Release history ==
Region	Release date	Format	Version	Label
Various	May 2, 2016	Digital download; streaming	Korean	Big Hit Entertainment
Various	September 7, 2016	Digital download; streaming	Japanese	Big Hit; Universal Japan; Virgin; Def Jam
