= 2016 Melon Music Awards =

2016 South Korean music award ceremony

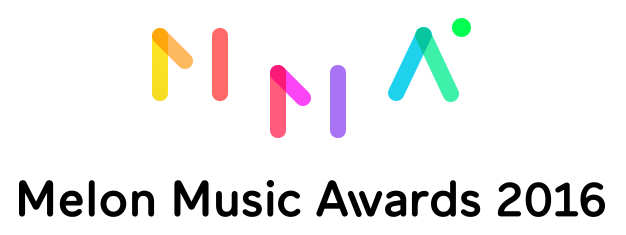
- Date: November 19, 2016
- Location: Gocheok Sky Dome, Seoul, South Korea

Highlights
- Most awards: Exo (5)
- Most nominations: Exo (6)
- Song of the Year: "Cheer Up"
- Album of the Year: The Most Beautiful Moment in Life: Young Forever
- Artist of the Year: Exo
- Website: www.melon.com/mma/index.htm

Television/radio coverage
- Network: JTBC2; JTBC4; 1theK; KakaoTV; Daum; Melon
- Runtime: 240 minutes

The 2016 Melon Music Awards ceremony, organized by Kakao M (a Kakao company) through its online music store Melon, took place on Saturday, November 19, 2016, in Seoul, South Korea. The eighth installment of the event since its offline launch in 2009, it was held at the Gocheok Sky Dome for the first time, which is one of the largest indoor concert venues in South Korea.

Details for the ceremony—including the announcement of its date and venue—were first made available on October 7, 2016. A list of nominations and the awardees for the Top 10 Artists were announced on November 4, with voting for the main awards beginning the same day.

The criteria for the awards varied depending on the category, consisting a mixture of digital sales data, judges evaluation, and online voting. Exo received the most nominations of the night, winning four of the six nominated categories. BTS, GFriend and Twice followed with the second most nominations with five each, while Zico received the second most awards, having won three times. Furthermore, BTS, Exo and Twice received the three daesang prizes of the night.

== Judging criteria ==
Division	Online Voting	Digital Sales	Judge Score
Main awards*	30%	70%	—
Genre Awards**	30%	40%	30%
Popularity Awards***	60%	40%	—
Special Awards****	—	—	100%
*Artist of the Year, Album of the Year, Song of the Year, Top 10 Artists, Best New Artist; **Rap/Hip Hop, R&B/Ballad, Rock, OST, Trot, Pop, Dance, Folk/Blue, Indie, Electronic; ***Netizen Popularity Award, Hot Trend Award; ****Music Video Award, Song Writer Award, MBC Music Star Award, Performing Arts Award, Global Star Award, QQ Asia Artist Award, Hall of Fame Award, Kakao Hot Star Award

== Performers ==
List of performances at 2016 Melon Music Awards
Artist(s)	Song(s)
BewhY	"Dejavu" + "Day Day"
10cm	"What the Spring??"
Seventeen	"Very Nice"
Mamamoo	"You're the Best" + "Decalcomanie"
Blackpink	"Whistle" + "Playing with Fire"
Jung Eun-ji	"Hopefully Sky"
Red Velvet	"Russian Roulette"
I.O.I	"Very Very Very" + "Dream Girls"
iKon	"Holup!" (Bobby solo) + "Sinosijak" + "Dumb & Dumber"
Twice	"Cheer Up" + "TT"
Zico	"I Am You, You Are Me" + "Boys and Girls" + "Yes or No"
GFriend	"Navillera" + "Rough"
BTS	"Blood Sweat & Tears" + "Fire"
Sechs Kies	"Comeback" + "Three Words" + "Couple"
Exo	"Growl" + "Overdose" + "Call Me Baby" + "Monster"

== Winners and nominees ==
=== Main awards ===
Winners and nominees are listed below. Winners are listed first and emphasized in bold.

Top 10 Artists (Bonsang)	Album of the Year (Daesang)
**Exo**; **BTS**; **Zico**; **Twice**; **AKMU**; **GFriend**; **Mamamoo**; **BewhY**; **Red Velvet**; **Taeyeon**	**BTS – The Most Beautiful Moment in Life: Young Forever**; Exo – Ex'Act; Psy – Chiljip Psy-da; AKMU – Spring; Jang Beom-june – Jang Beom June 2 Album
Artist of the Year (Daesang)	Song of the Year (Daesang)
**Exo**; Twice; BTS; GFriend; Zico	**Twice – "Cheer Up"**; Zico – "I Am You, You Are Me"; Urban Zakapa – "I Don't Love You"; GFriend – "Rough"; MC the Max – "No Matter Where"
Best New Artist	Best Dance Award (Male)
**Blackpink**; NCT 127; Bolbbalgan4; I.O.I; WJSN	**Exo** **– "Monster"**; BTS – "Fire"; Winner – "Sentimentaly"; Seventeen – "Pretty U"; Psy ft. CL – "Daddy"
Best Dance Award (Female)	Best Folk/Blues Award
**GFriend – "Rough"**; Twice – "Cheer Up"; Red Velvet – "Russian Roulette"; Mamamoo – "You're The Best"; Wonder Girls – "Why So Lonely"	**10cm – "What The Spring??"**; AKMU – "Re-Bye"; Sam Kim – "No Sense"; Accourve – "Should Our Paths Cross Again"; Hello Gayoung – "Feelings"
Best Rap/Hip Hop Award	Best R&B/Soul Award
**Zico – "Eureka" (feat. Zion.T)**; BewhY – "Day Day"; Park Kyung ft. Eunha – "Inferiority Complex"; Gary ft. Gaeko – "Lonely Night"; San E, Mad Clown – "Sour Grapes"	**Baekhyun & Suzy – "Dream"**; Zico – "I Am You, You Are Me"; Dean – "D (Half Moon)"; Crush ft. Taeyeon – "Don't Forget"; Lee Hi – "Breathe"
Best Indie Award	Best Rock Award
**Bolbbalgan4 – "Galaxy"**; Standing Egg – "Summer Night You & I"; The Black Skirts – "Everything"; Jung Joon Il ft. BewhY – "Plastic"; Kiha & The Faces – "Kieuk"	**Ha Hyun-woo – "Don't Cry"**; Buzz – "Love From The Heart, Pt. 3"; Jang Beom-june – "Fallen In Love (Only With You)"; Nell – "Lost In Perspective"; CNBLUE – "You're So Beautiful"
Best Trot Award	Best OST Award
**Hong Jin-young – "Thumbs Up"**; Yoon Jung-soo, Kim Sook – "You're The Boss"; Jung Yoon-jeong, Seo Byung-soon – "Evocation"; Jo Jung-min – "Superman"; Han Young – "Mirror"	**Yoon Mi-rae – "Always"** (Descendants of the Sun); Davichi – "This Love" (Descendants of the Sun); Ben – "Like A Dream" (Another Miss Oh); Gummy – "You Are My Everything" (Descendants of the Sun); Oh Hyuk – "A Little Girl" (for Reply 1988)
Best Pop Award	Best Ballad Award
**Justin Bieber – "Love Yourself"**; Troye Sivan – "Youth"; Charlie Puth – "One Call Away"; Lukas Graham – "7 Years"; Gnash – "I Hate U, I Love U" (ft. Olivia O'Brien)	**Jung Eun-ji – "Hopefully Sky"**; **Im Chang-jung – "The Love I Committed"**; Kim Na-young - "What If It Was Going"; Park Hyo-shin - "Breath"; Urban Zakapa - "I Don't Love You"; Eddy Kim - "My Lips are warm like Coffee" (Feat. Lee Sung Kyung); M.C The Max - "No Matter Where"; Yoon Mirae - "This Love"; Taeyeon - "Rain"; Han Dong-geun - "Amazing You"
Netizen Popularity Award	Hot Trend Award
**Exo**; BTS; Twice; I.O.I; Mamamoo; Beast; GFriend; Block B; Winner; Wonder Girls	**Zico**; Im Chang-jung; Park Hyo-shin; Ha Hyun-woo; Jang Beom-june

=== Other awards ===
Nominees	Winners
Music Video of the Year	Red Velvet – "Russian Roulette"
Kakao Hot Star	Exo
MBC Music Star Award	Seventeen
Tecent QQ Music Asia Artist	iKon
Hall of Fame	Sechs Kies
Songwriter Award	Hitman Bang

== Stats ==
=== Artists with multiple nominations ===
6 nominations

- Exo

5 nominations

- BTS
- GFriend
- Twice

3 nominations

- AKMU
- Bewhy
- Jang Beom-june
- Mamamoo
- Red Velvet

2 nominations

- I.O.I
- Psy
- Seventeen
- Winner

=== Artists with multiple awards ===
5 awards

- Exo

3 awards

- Zico

2 awards

- BTS
- GFriend
- Red Velvet
- Twice

== Gallery ==
2016 Melon Music Awards gallery
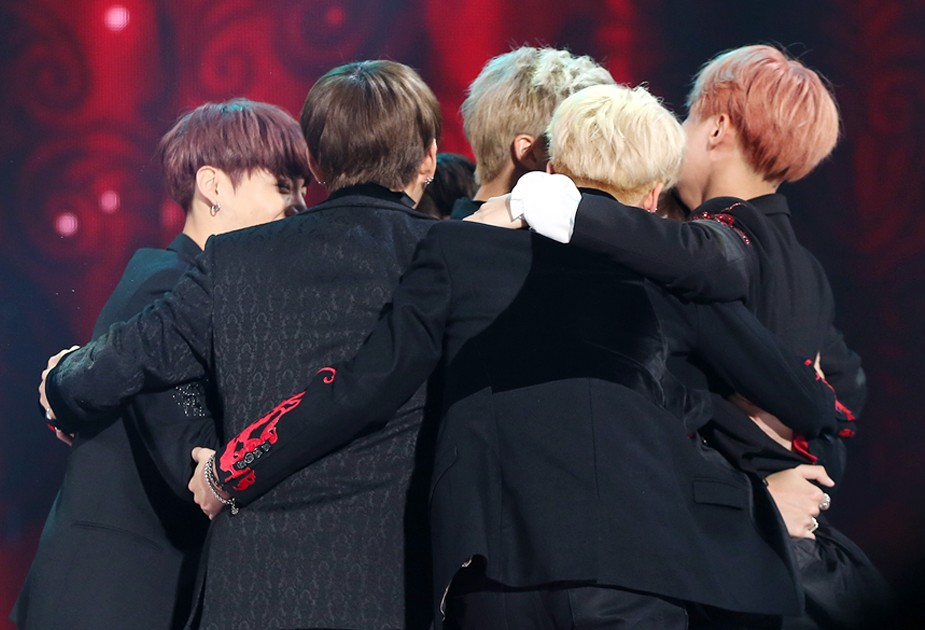
BTS after winning their first daesang

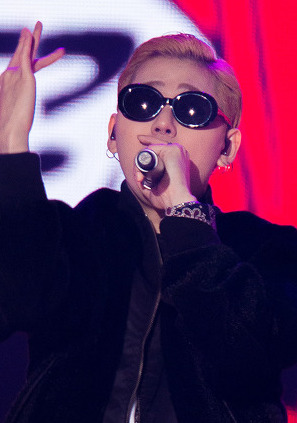
Zico

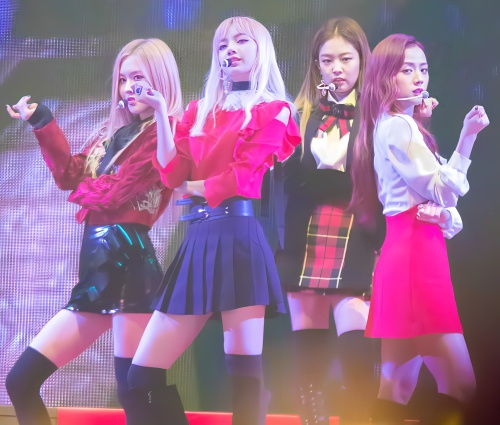
Blackpink performing "Playing with Fire"

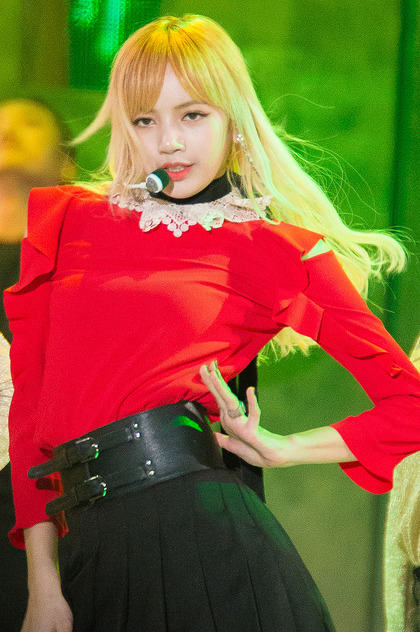
Blackpink's Lisa

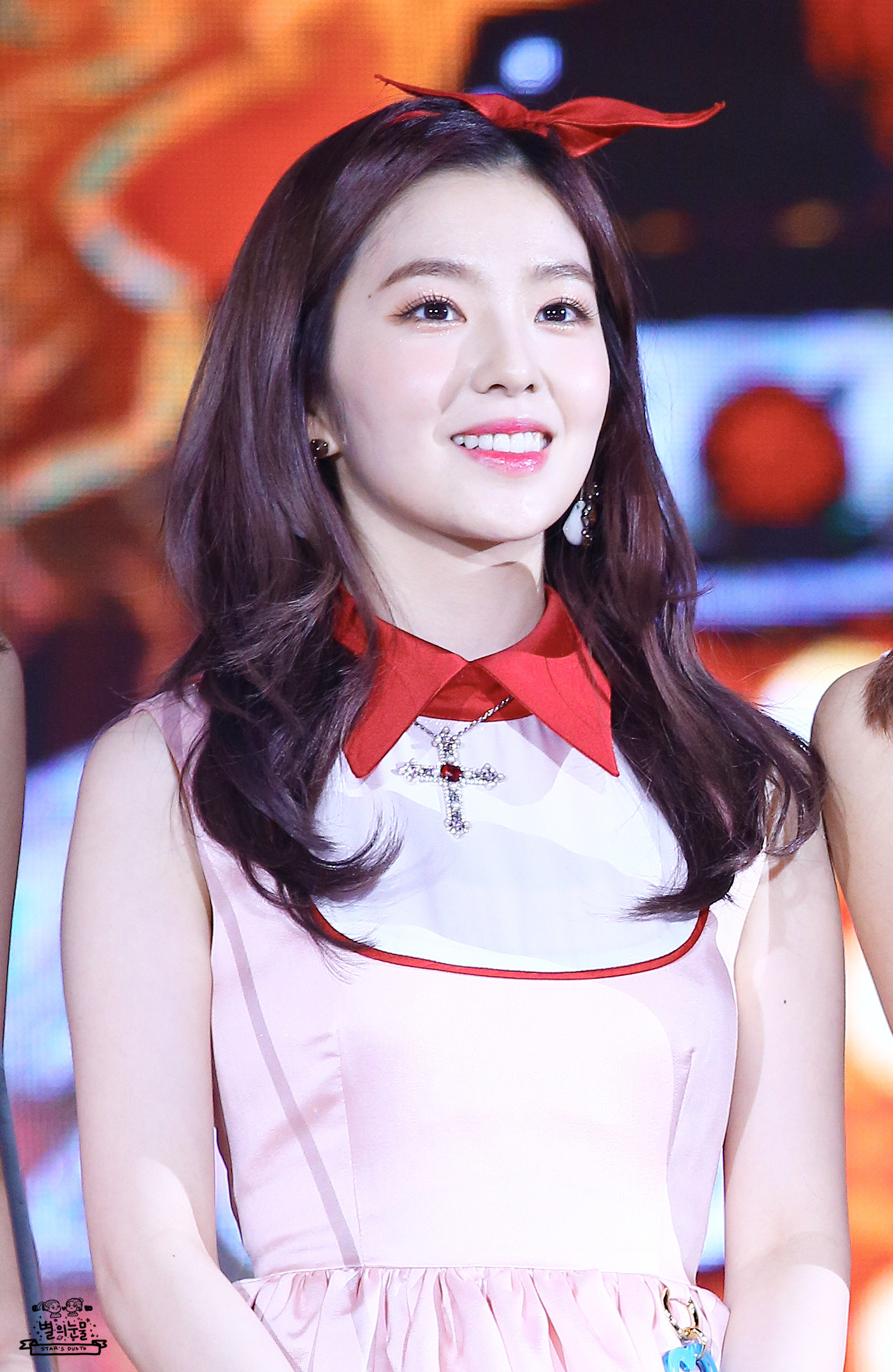
Red Velvet's Irene

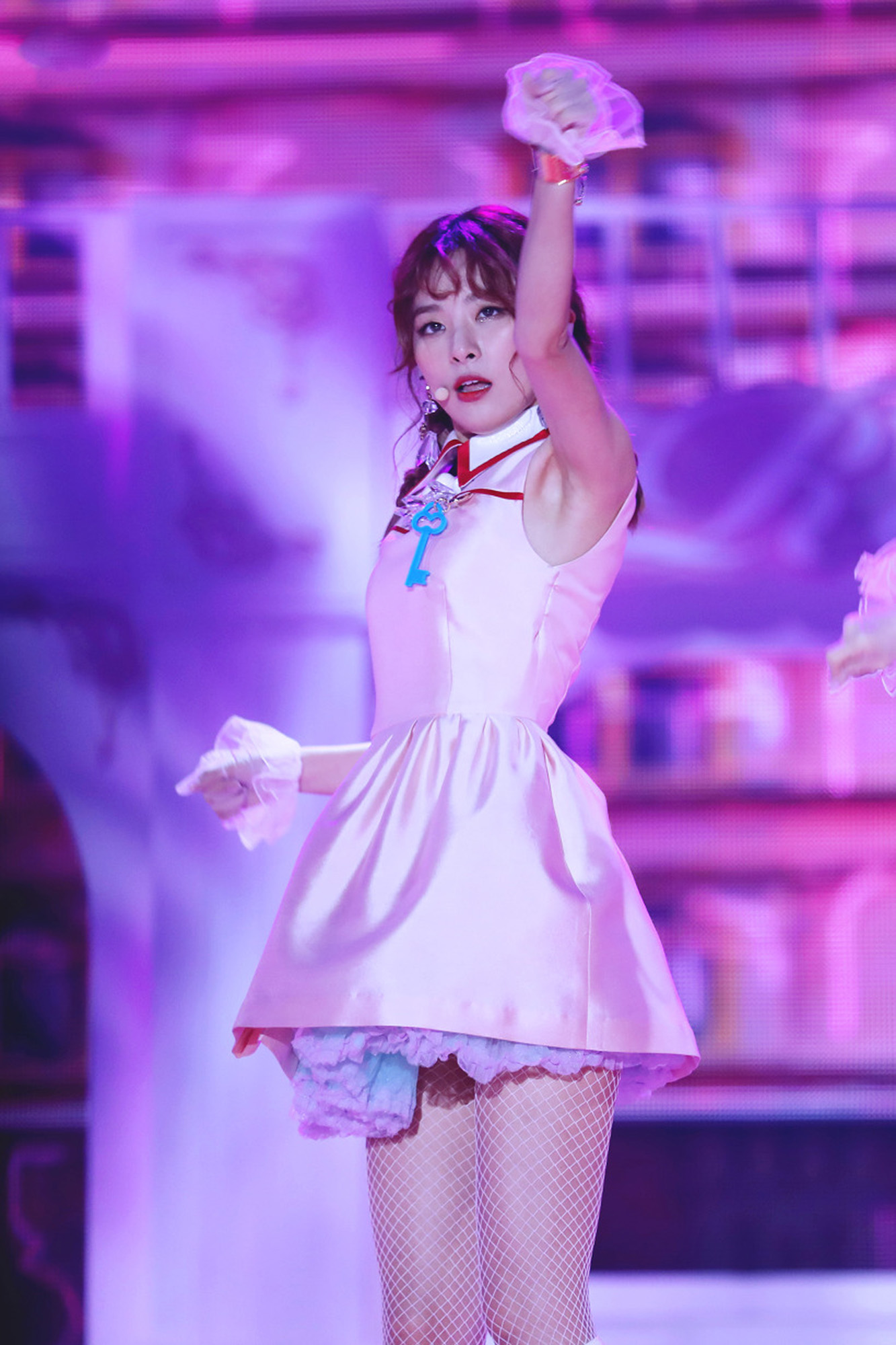
Red Velvet's Seulgi performing "Russian Roulette"

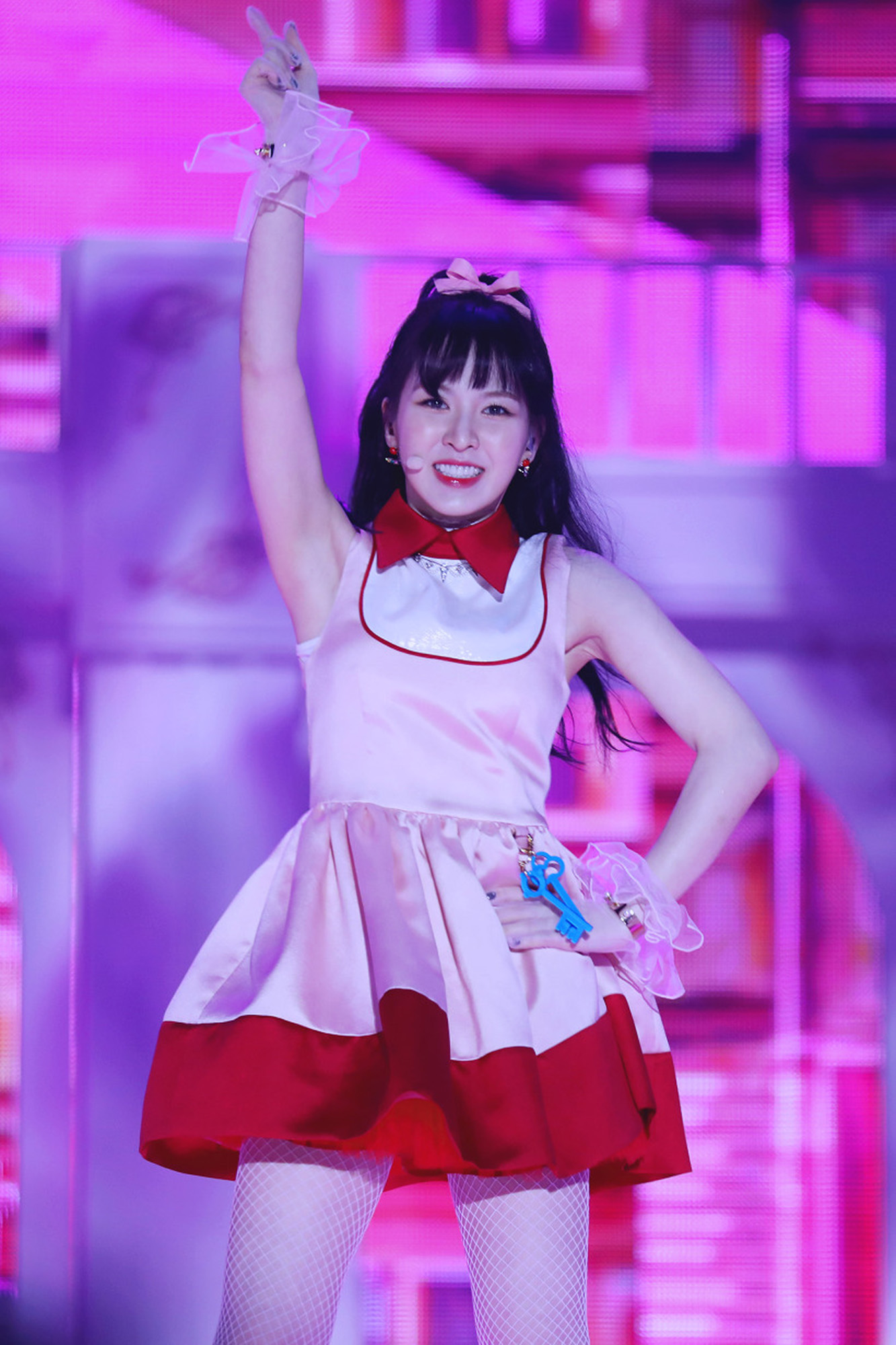
Red Velvet's Wendy

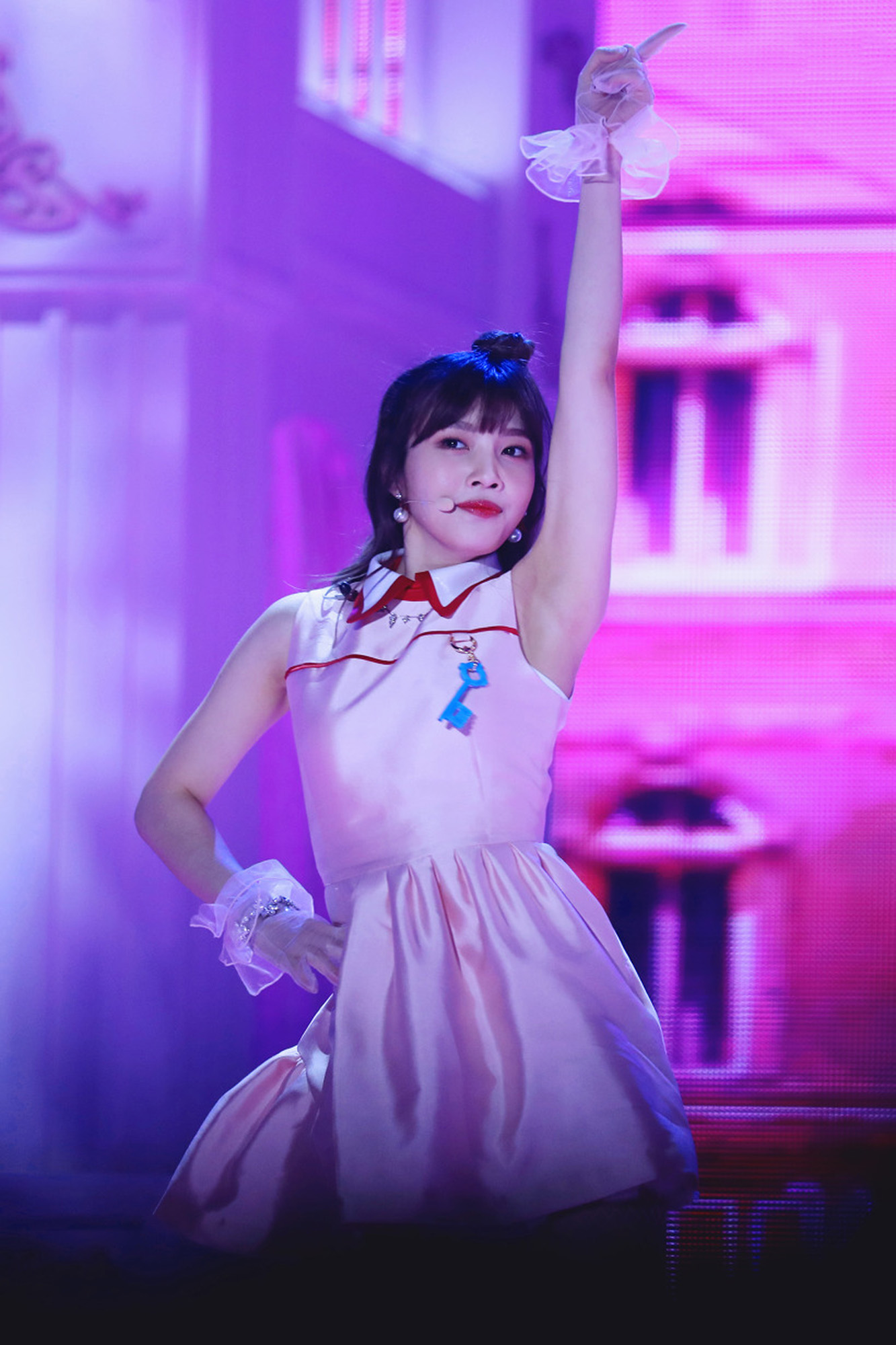
Red Velvet's Joy

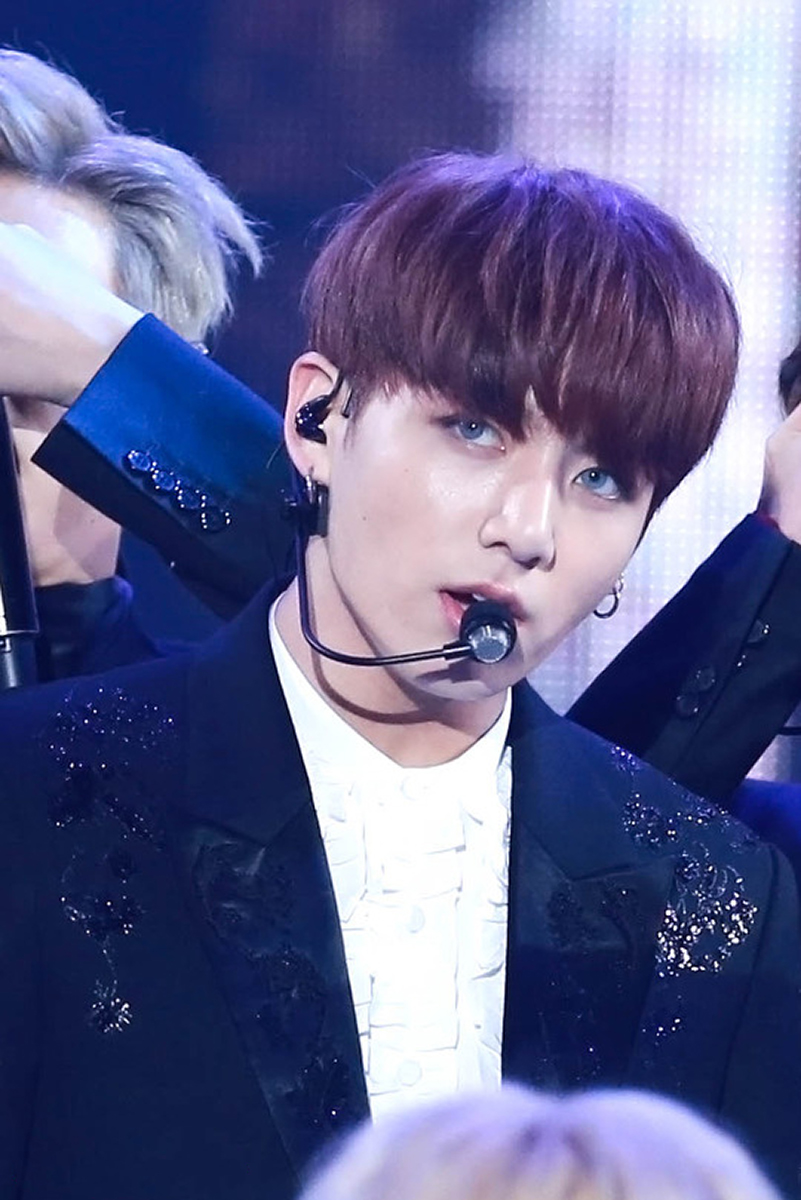
BTS's Jungkook

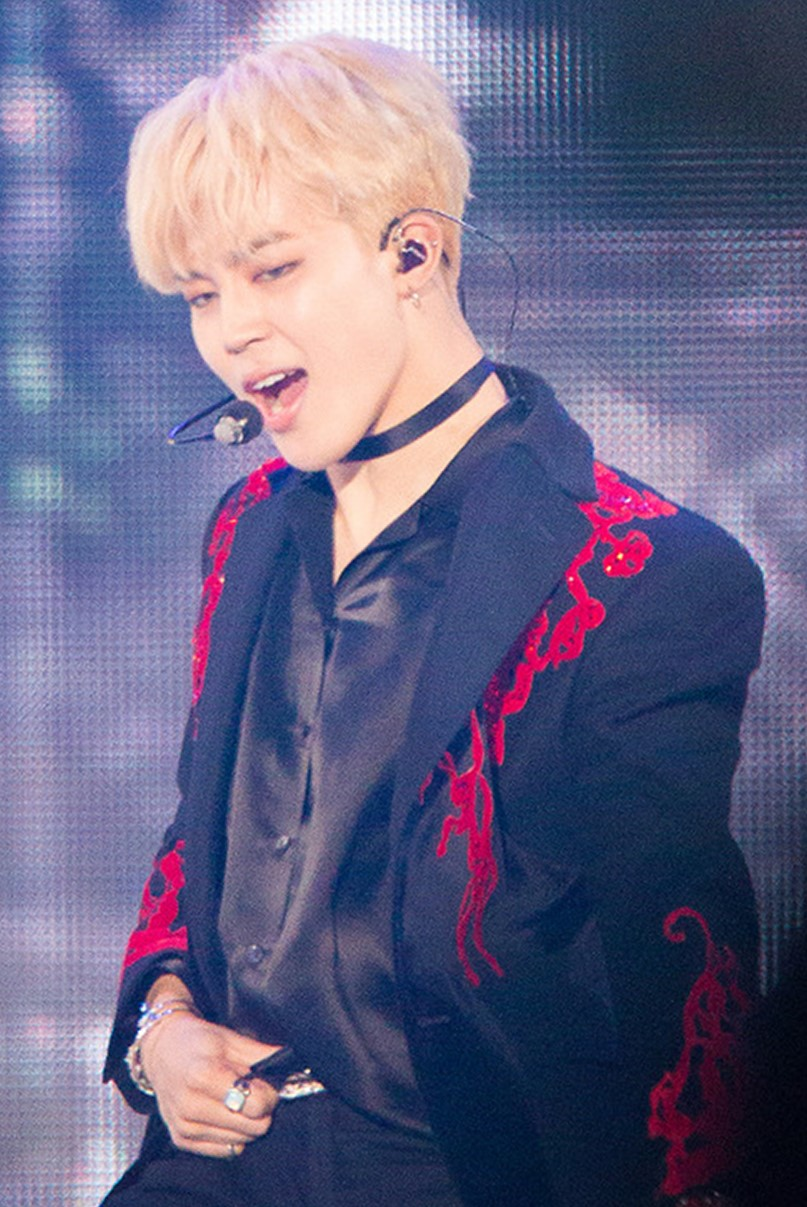
BTs's Jimin

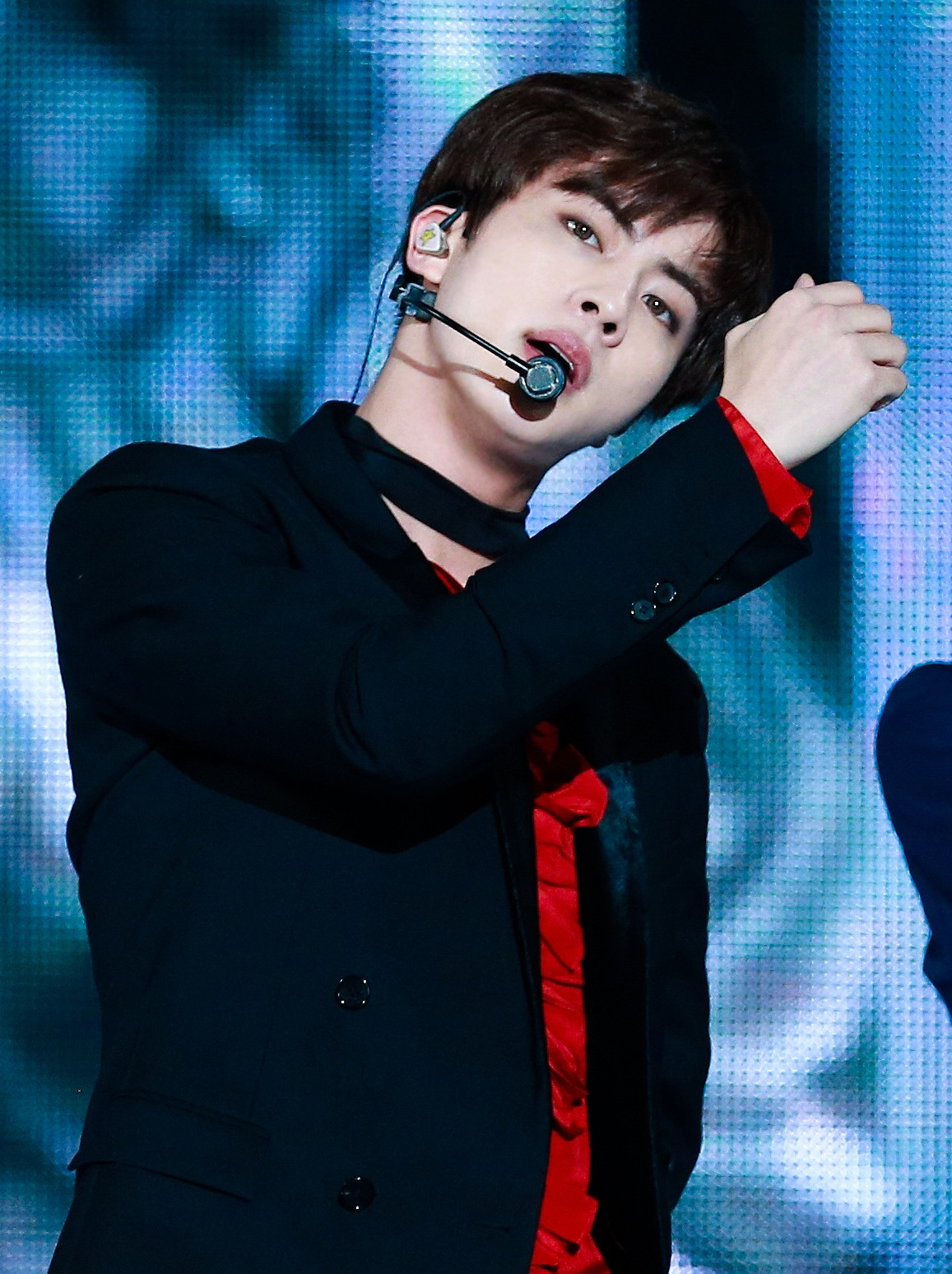
BTS's Jin

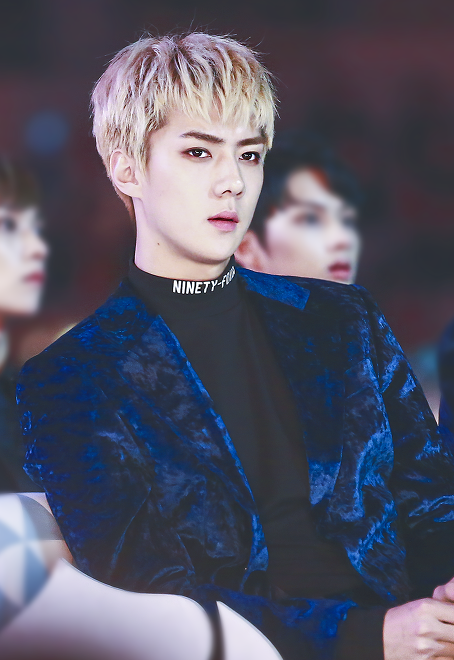
Exo's Sehun

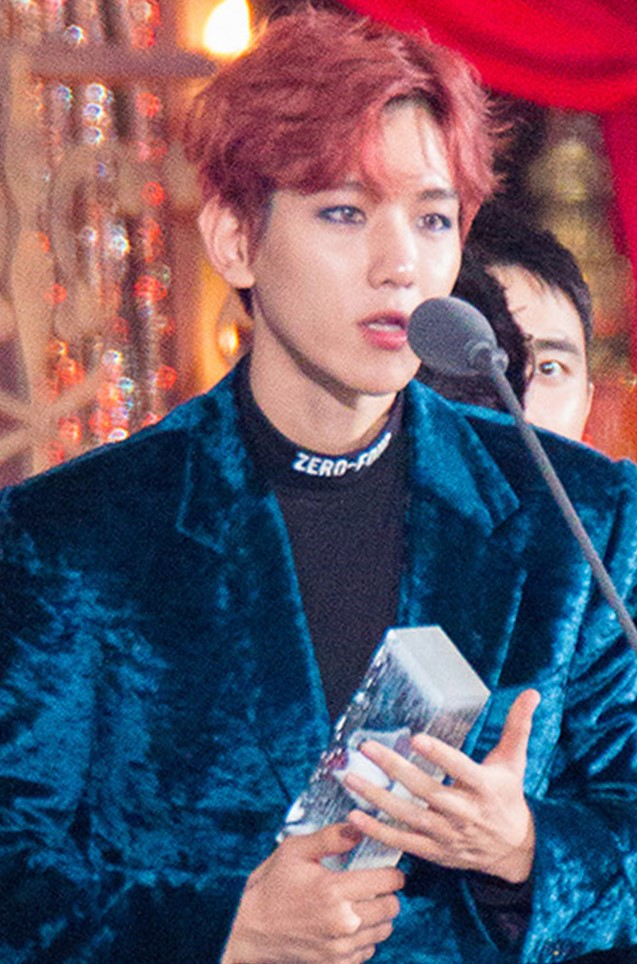
Exo's Baekhyun

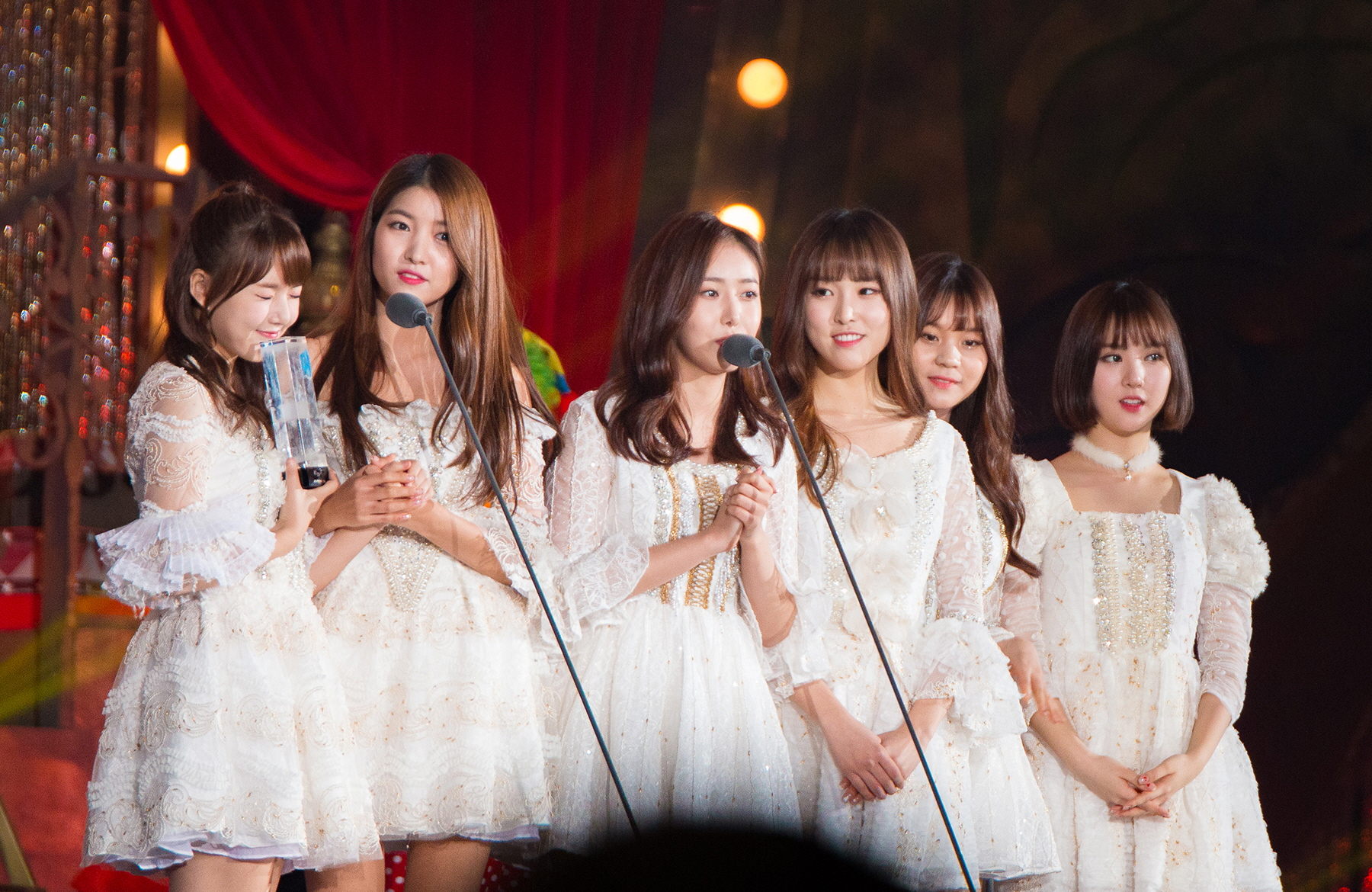
GFriend after winning Best Dance Performance

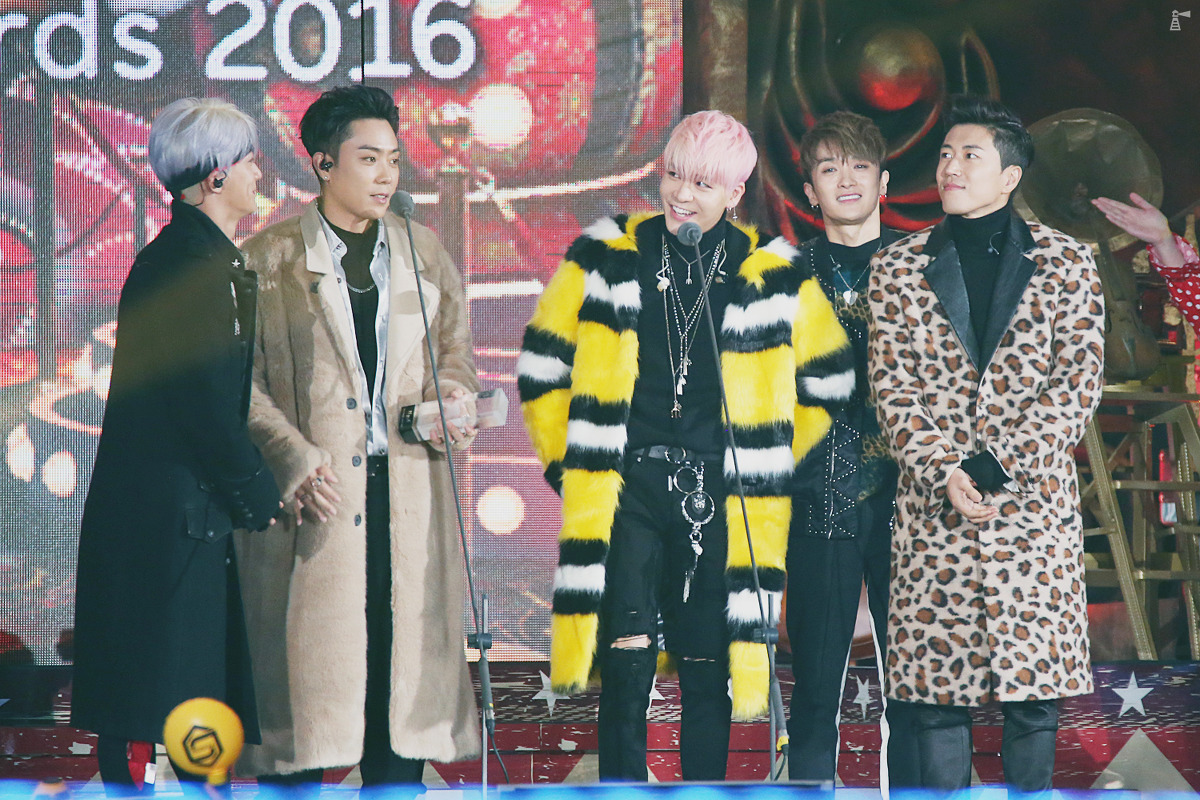
Sechs Kies after winning Hall of Fame

== Anecdote ==
When BTS was announced as one of the Top 10 Artists , An Yu-jin, future member of Iz*One and Ive who was an ordinary audience member at the time, enthusiastically cheered along with the crowd. Six years later, at the 2022 Melon Music Awards, An returned to the stage as the leader of Ive, performing and receiving awards with her group.
