= Fire (BTS song) =

2016 single by BTS

Single by BTS

from the album The Most Beautiful Moment in Life: Young Forever
- Released: May 2, 2016
- Studio: Dogg Bounce
- Genre: Electro house; dubstep
- Length: 3:23
- Label: Big Hit
- Songwriters: Kang Hyo-won; Bang Si-hyuk; Kim Nam-joon; Min Yoon-gi; Jung Ho-seok; Im Gwang-wuk
- Producer: Pdogg

BTS singles chronology
"Epilogue: Young Forever" (2016)	"Fire" (2016)	"Save Me" (2016)

Music video
- "Fire" on YouTube

"Fire" (Korean: 불타오르네; RR: bultaoreune) is a song recorded by South Korean boy group BTS for their first compilation album, The Most Beautiful Moment in Life: Young Forever (2016). The electro house and dubstep song was released by Big Hit on May 2, 2016, in South Korea with the Japanese version being released September 7, 2016, on their full album Youth, under Universal Music Japan and Virgin Music-Def Jam Recordings.

== Music video ==
The music video for "Fire" was released on May 2. The video was produced and directed by Lumpens and GDW. Fuse stated the cut "[felt] like an upgraded version of "Dope"" and showcased "the guys whipping out their most intense choreography to date". On May 9, BTS released the dance version of the "Fire" video ahead of their promotion on music programs. The dance was choreographed by Keone Madrid and Vinh Nguyen. Two copies of the music video were uploaded on YouTube: one by 1theK and the other by Hybe Labels. As of November 2021, the music video uploaded by 1theK has over 710 million views.

== Commercial performance ==
BTS topped the Billboard World Digital Songs chart with the single. The videos for "Save Me" ranked first on the Most Viewed K-Pop Videos in America, Around the World: May 2016 list revealed by Billboard.

== Promotion ==
BTS decided to promote on music shows only for a week, performing on Mnet, KBS, MBC and SBS as planned to allow for individual activities, performances and overseas schedules, starting with M! Countdown on May 12. The song was promoted at SBS Gayo Daejeon in December 2018.

== Credits and personnel ==
The Korean credits are adapted from the CD liner notes of The Most Beautiful Moment in Life: Young Forever.

- Pdogg- producer, keyboard, synthesizer, chorus, vocal and rap arrangement, recording engineer @ Dogg Bounce
- "hitman" bang- producer
- RM- producer
- SUGA- producer
- Devine Channel- producer
- Jungkook- chorus
- Jimin- chorus
- James F. Reynolds- mix engineer

== Accolades ==
Awards and nominations
Year	Organization	Category	Result	Ref.
2016	Melon Music Awards	Best Dance Award – Male	Nominated	
2017	Soompi Awards	Best Choreography	Nominated	

Music program awards
Program	Date	Ref.
M! Countdown	May 12, 2016	
Music Bank	May 13, 2016	
Inkigayo	May 15, 2016	

== Charts ==
=== Weekly ===
Weekly chart performance for "Fire"
Chart (2016–17)	Peak position
Finland Download (Latauslista)	11
Japan (Japan Hot 100)	30
Philippines (Philippine Hot 100)	22
South Korea (Gaon)	7
US World Digital Song Sales (Billboard)	1

=== Year-end ===
Year-end chart performance for "Fire"
Chart (2016)	Position
South Korea (Gaon)	87
US World Digital Songs (Billboard)	7

== Certifications and sales ==
Region	Certification	Certified units/sales
New Zealand (RMNZ)	Gold	15,000^{‡}
South Korea	—	856,373
United States	—	100,000
^{‡} Sales+streaming figures based on certification alone.

== Release history ==
Region	Release date	Format	Version	Label
Various	May 2, 2016	Digital download; streaming	Korean	Big Hit Entertainment
Various	September 7, 2016	Digital download; streaming	Japanese	Pony Canyon
