= I Need U (BTS song) =

2015 single by BTS

- Japanese regular and digital cover

Single by BTS

from the EP The Most Beautiful Moment in Life, Pt. 1
- Language: Korean; Japanese
- B-side: "Dope" / "Attack on Bangtan" (Japanese version)
- Released: April 29, 2015 (South Korea); December 8, 2015 (Japan)
- Studio: Dogg Bounce; Carrot Express
- Genre: Hip hop; R&B; dance
- Length: 3:31
- Label: Big Hit; Pony Canyon
- Songwriters: "Hitman" Bang; RM; Suga; J-Hope; Brother Su
- Producer: Pdogg

BTS Korean singles chronology
"War of Hormone" (2014)	"I Need U" (2015)	"Dope" (2015)

BTS Japanese singles chronology
"Danger" (2014)	"For You / I Need U" (2015)	"Run" (2016)

Music video
- "I Need U" on YouTube "I Need U" (Original version) on YouTube

"I Need U" (stylized in all caps) is a song recorded by South Korean boy band BTS as the lead single from their third extended play, The Most Beautiful Moment in Life, Part 1 (2015). The single was released by Big Hit Entertainment on April 29, 2015, in South Korea. It was the first of BTS' career to garner them a win on a South Korean television music show. Two remix versions of the song were subsequently released on the band's first compilation album The Most Beautiful Moment in Life: Young Forever in 2016. By September 2016, the song had sold over 800,000 digital downloads domestically. In December 2019, its music video became BTS' 14th to surpass 200 million views.

A Japanese version of the song was released digitally and in physical format on December 8, 2015, through Pony Canyon in Japan. The physical single was certified gold by the Recording Industry Association of Japan (RIAJ) that same month for selling over 100,000 copies. The digital single received silver certification in June 2021 for surpassing 30 million streams. In 2019, Billboard ranked "I Need U" as the 80th greatest K-pop song on its list of the 100 Greatest K-pop Songs of the 2010s. BBC named it one of the songs that truly defined the 2010s, referring to it as the starting point where BTS would become worldwide sensations.

== Composition ==
"I Need U" is "an expressive dance track that soars with BTS’ emotive vocals as whistling synths, reverberating hi-hats, and R&B-inspired riffs build upon one another to create a sense of melodic despondency." The song serves as “the start of one’s young adulthood, in which beauty coexists with uncertainty, and focuses on the uncertain future more than the glamour of youth.” The original version of the song is in the key of F minor and 158 beats per minute.

== Background and release ==
The Korean version of the song was not released as a separate single. In Japan, a physical release of the single was announced on November 12, 2015. On December 8, the single was released in Japan through Pony Canyon. The tracklist included two B-side songs that were also Japanese versions of songs from the original Korean EP. Four editions of the single were made available for purchase: a CD-only regular edition that included one of eight collectible photocards (first press albums only); a CD+DVD limited edition that contained album jacket making-of footage; a Loppi/HMV CD+DVD limited edition that included music video making-of footage and an exclusive photo gallery; and a special Pony Canyon BTS SHOP CD-only edition that included one of eight special limited production photocards with a Christmas message on it. Two official remixes of the track were later released on May 2, 2016, on The Most Beautiful Moment in Life: Young Forever compilation album.

== Critical reception ==
"I Need U" was met with positive reviews from critics, several of whom noted BTS' partial auditory shift away from their classically hip-hop oriented singles and exploration of other genres "towards a more diverse, pop sound" as a turning point in the band's career that laid the groundwork for their future rise to international superstardom and propelled their "momentum further than ever before, with both local and international audiences taking note". Writing for Billboard, Tamar Herman felt the track was "less of a song and more of a revolution", calling it a "milestone of sonic development", and praised the tonal shift in the band's musicality towards a more "ambient electronic-pop sound" as a "representation of their stylistic maturing". Tassia Assis of Clash labelled it a "vital BTS track" that "thrives on a wistful atmosphere of electronic synths and emotional hooks" and "take[s] the listener on a journey that is both exhilarating and moving".

NME's Rhian Daly highlighted BTS' ability to pour emotion into everything as one of the band's "greatest strengths", commenting that listeners can hear the "desperation", "ambivalence" and "vulnerability" ripe in the band's voices "as they call out: "I need you, girl / Why do I love alone and say goodbye alone" and "try to cling onto a relationship that has already died". She ranked it as the fifth greatest BTS song released. In a joint review for Vulture, Youngdae Kim and T.K. Park wrote that the "romantic chords in the intro" create a "fierce and tragic atmosphere" when they meet the "desperation-laden refrain" but, "despite the intense trap beat" and the "tense development in the rap and chord progression of the verse", it "leaves the listener with tender softness"—they called it "one of the defining tracks of BTS' career".

== Accolades ==
BTS received the Best Male Dance award for "I Need U" at the 2015 Melon Music Awards. In 2019, Billboard ranked "I Need U" as the 80th greatest K-pop song of the 2010s, writing that it "shot BTS to new heights in South Korea and rewrote the fortunes of today's biggest boy band".

"I Need U" on critic lists
Publication	List	Rank	Ref.
BBC	The songs that truly defined the 2010s	No order	
Idolator	The 25 Best K-Pop Songs of 2015	15	
Metro	K-pop's best 19+ rated videos	No order	
Billboard	The 100 Greatest K-Pop Songs of the 2010s	80	
Rolling Stone	100 Greatest Songs in the History of Korean Pop Music	52	

Music program awards for "I Need U"
Program	Date	Ref.
The Show	May 5, 2015	
The Show	May 12, 2015	
M Countdown	May 7, 2015	
Music Bank	May 8, 2015	
Show Champion	May 13, 2015	

== Commercial performance ==
Immediately after release, "I Need U" became the top trending search term on South-Korean portal sites and ranked number one on various real-time music charts, including Soribada, Genie, and Daum Music. The song also managed to crack the top 10 on Melon, Bugs, and Naver Music's real-time music charts. It debuted at number five on Gaon's Weekly Digital and Weekly Download charts, with 93,790 digital units sold in its first week. The single went on to accumulate over 850,000 digital downloads.

In Japan, the single sold over 43,000 copies on its opening day and debuted at number one on the Oricon Daily Singles Chart. By the end of its first tracking week, it sold an accumulated 95,668 copies for the period dated December 7–13, and entered the weekly chart at number three. In the US, "I Need U" debuted at number 4 on the Billboard World Digital Songs Chart, ranking the highest of the six tracks from its parent EP that entered the chart. As of September 2019, the song has sold 98,000 downloads.

== Music video ==
The music video's release was preceded by a teaser clip uploaded to Big Hit's official YouTube channel on April 23, 2015. The full music video, in which the members of BTS portrayed "discomforted youths...running away from the past", was released on April 29. It was later revealed that the video had been edited to lower its rating from 19+ to 15+ in order to meet the Korea Media Rating Board's rating standards. The uncut 19+ version, titled "I Need U (Original ver.)", was released on May 10. It included almost two minutes of extended scenes containing darker themes and more graphic imagery than the previous video. Both the original and extended versions were produced and directed by Lumpens.

Through the music video, BTS brought their long-standing creative narrative, typically known as the "BU" or "BTS Universe", to the forefront. Speaking to Billboard, Michelle Cho, an assistant professor of East Asian Popular Cultures at the University of Toronto, said: "As an audio-visual experience, "I Need U" inaugurated the Bangtan Universe—the coming-of-age storyline that brilliantly integrates the Most Beautiful Moment in Life [album] trilogy and continues in music videos, "concept videos" (mini-films), and the multiform, open-ended narrative that's been serialized in album liner notes and Twitter and Instagram posts".

A music video for the Japanese version of "I Need U" was also produced; a teaser for the video was posted to BTS' official Japanese YouTube channel on November 21, 2015. Directed by Yoo-jung Ko of Lumpens, the full music video was released on December 1, 2015.

=== Reception ===
"I Need U" reached one million views in 16 hours—the fastest record for any BTS music video at the time. On November 20, 2017, the music video crossed 100 million views, becoming the band's tenth video to do so. It surpassed 200 million views on December 24, 2019—the band's 14th music video to do so, making them the Korean artist with the most music videos exceeding that many views. Additionally, "I Need U (Original ver.)" was the group's 30th to surpass 100 million views—doing so on March 16, 2021—and further extended their record among Korean singers as the act with the most music videos exceeding that many views.

== Promotion and live performances ==
=== Promotion ===
On April 29, 2015, prior to the release of the "I Need U" music video at midnight, BTS broadcast a live comeback preview show on the Naver V Live broadcasting app. This was the first time the group collaborated with Naver for comeback promotions. On April 30, BTS held their first comeback stage performance on Mnet’s M Countdown. Two tracks from the album, "Boyz with Fun" and "Converse High", were deemed unfit for broadcast by KBS due to lyrics containing swear words and brand names, such as Converse, Chanel, and Alexander McQueen. The latter track was also deemed unfit for broadcast by MBC. However, the group went on to successfully promote across multiple channels on various South Korean television music programs, including on KBS, MBC, SBS, and Arirang TV. BTS garnered their first music show win since debut on the May 5 episode of SBS MTV's The Show. The song also took first place on MBC's Show Champion, Mnet's M Countdown, and KBS' Music Bank, with a second win on The Show the following week, for a total of five number one awards. BTS wrapped up promotions for "I Need U" with a final performance held on the May 31 broadcast of SBS Inkigayo.

To commemorate the release of the Japanese single and generate further interest, a special pop-up shop in collaboration with Shibuya Marui was announced on November 18, 2015. The store ran from November 28 to December 20 and sold limited edition "I Need U" themed BTS goods. Hi-touch (high-five) and handshake events carded for 2016 were announced in November and December. They were held in Osaka on January 30, Tokyo on January 31, and Sapporo on February 7.

=== Live performances ===
In addition to comeback promotions on various television music programs in South Korea, BTS performed "I Need U" at several of the largest K-pop concerts and festivals in South Korea, including the 2015 Dream Concert, KBS1's 열린음악회 (Open Concert), Asia Song Festival in Busan, and the 2015 Super Seoul Concert in Sky Dome. A special remixed version of the song was presented for the first and only time at the 2015 Melon Music Awards on November 7. The song was also performed at major overseas events such as the 17th Korea & China Song Festival in Beijing, China, and the 2015 Kpop Concert Live In Yangon Myanmar held to mark the 40th anniversary of Korea-Myanmar diplomatic relations. "I Need U" was subsequently included as a permanent part of every BTS tour setlist since its release. In 2020, BTS performed "I Need U" as part of their three-song set for the 10th annual KBS Song Festival held on December 18. Presented as a special throwback tribute to their first music show number-one, the band dressed in black and white outfits reminiscent of the ones they wore for their performance of the song on Music Bank in May 2015 (when they won their fourth first-place trophy).

== Credits and personnel ==
Credits adapted from "I Need U" regular edition liner notes.

- Pdogg – production, keyboard (Tracks 1–3), synthesizer (Tracks 1, 2), rap arrangement (Tracks 1–3), vocal arrangement (Tracks 1–3), record engineering (@ Dogg Bounce, South Korea)
- "hitman" bang – co-production
- Suga – keyboard (Track 3), synthesizer (Track 3), rap arrangement (Track 3), vocal arrangement (Track 3)
- Jungkook – chorus (Tracks 1–3)
- V – chorus (Track 2)
- Slow Rabbit – audio, vocal arrangement (Track 3), record engineering (@ Carrot Express, South Korea)
- Changwon Yang – music engineering
- Bosung Kim – music engineering
- James F. Reynolds – mix engineering (@ Schmuzik Studios, London, England) (Tracks 1 & 2)
- Bob Horn – mix engineering (@ Echo Bar Studio, North Hollywood, California) (Track 3)
- Alex DeYoung – mastering (@ DeYoung Mastering, Los Angeles, California)
- KM-MARKIT – song writing (Japanese lyrics)

== Track listing ==
Korean version
No.	Title	Writer(s)	Producer(s)	Length
1.	"I Need U"	Pdogg; "Hitman" Bang; Rap Monster; SUGA; J-Hope; Brother Su	Pdogg	3:31

Korean version [Compilation album]
No.	Title	Writer(s)	Producer(s)	Length
1.	"I Need U" (Urban Mix)	Pdogg; "Hitman" Bang; RM; Brother Su	보라돌이; Slow Rabbit	3:35
2.	"I Need U" (Remix)	Pdogg; "Hitman" Bang; RM; Brother Su	SHAUN	3:42

CD single – Japanese version
No.	Title	Writer(s)	Producer(s)	Length
1.	"I Need U" (Japanese Ver.)	Pdogg; Hitman Bang; RM; SUGA; J-hope; Brother Su	Pdogg	3:32
2.	"Dope (-超ヤベー!-)" (Japanese Ver.)	Pdogg; Ear Attaack; Hitman Bang; RM; SUGA; J-hope	Pdogg	4:01
Total length:				7:33

Bonus Track [Regular and Shop editions]
No.	Title	Writer(s)	Producer(s)	Length
3.	"Boyz with Fun (フンタン少年団)" (Japanese Ver.)	SUGA; Pdogg; Hitman Bang; RM; J-hope; Jin; Jimin; V	SUGA; Pdogg	4:05
Total length:				11:38

== Charts ==
=== Weekly charts ===
Weekly chart performance for "I Need U"
Chart (2015)	Peak position
Japan (Japan Hot 100)	4
Japan (Japan Hot 100) Japanese ver.	4
Japan (Oricon) Japanese ver.	3
Philippines (Philippine Hot 100)	19
South Korea (Gaon)	5
US World Digital Song Sales (Billboard)	3

=== Monthly charts ===
Chart (May 2015)	Position
South Korea (Gaon)	12

=== Year-end charts ===
Chart (2015)	Position
Japan (Oricon) Japanese ver.	67
South Korea (Gaon)	90

== Certifications and sales ==
Certifications and sales for "I Need U"
Region	Certification	Certified units/sales
Japan (RIAJ) Japanese ver.	Gold	109,000
New Zealand (RMNZ)	Gold	15,000^{‡}
South Korea	—	830,333
South Korea Urban Mix	—	31,423
South Korea Remix	—	25,720
United States	—	98,000
Streaming
Japan (RIAJ) Japanese ver.	Gold	50,000,000^{†}
^{‡} Sales+streaming figures based on certification alone.^{†} Streaming-only figures based on certification alone.

== Release history ==
Release dates and formats for "I Need U"
Country	Date	Format(s)	Version	Label	Ref.
Various	April 29, 2015	Digital download	Original	Big Hit Entertainment	
Various	December 8, 2015	Digital download	Japanese	Big Hit; Pony Canyon	
Various	May 2, 2016	Digital download	Urban Mix, Remix	Big Hit	
