= Run (BTS song) =

2015 single by BTS

- Japanese version cover

Single by BTS

from the EP The Most Beautiful Moment in Life, Pt. 2
- B-side: "Butterfly" / "Good Day"
- Released: November 30, 2015
- Studio: Dogg Bounce
- Genre: Hip hop; dance-rock
- Label: Big Hit; Pony Canyon
- Songwriters: Pdogg; "Hitman" Bang; Rap Monster; SUGA; V; Jungkook; J-Hope
- Producers: Pdogg; Slow Rabbit

BTS Korean singles chronology
"Dope" (2015)	"Run" (2015)	"Epilogue: Young Forever" (2016)

BTS Japanese singles chronology
"I Need U" (2015)	"Run" (2016)	"Chi, Ase, Namida" (2017)

Music video
- "Run" on YouTube

"Run" is a song recorded by South Korean boy band BTS as the lead single for their fourth extended play, The Most Beautiful Moment in Life, Pt. 2 (2015). The original Korean version was released by Big Hit Entertainment on November 30, 2015, in South Korea. The Japanese single version was released on March 15, 2016, under the Pony Canyon label.

== Composition ==
"Run" has been described as a dance-rock song with lyrics about continuing to get up and run, even if obstacles continue to knock you down. The song is composed in the key of F♯ minor at a tempo of 133 beats per minute.

== Editions ==
The Korean version of the song was not released as a separate single. Two official remixes—a Ballad Remix and Alternative Remix—were included on The Most Beautiful Moment in Life: Young Forever compilation album, which was released on May 2, 2016.

The Japanese version of "Run" was released as an individual single and included two B-side songs: "Butterfly", the Japanese version of the song of the same name from the original Korean EP, and "Good Day", an original Japanese track. Four editions of the single were made available:

- Limited Edition [CD + DVD] (PCCA-4360): This edition included a DVD containing the album jacket photo shoot making-of footage.
- Regular Edition [CD Only] (PCCA-4361): This edition included 1 of 8 collectible photocards available only with first press albums.
- Loppi·HMV Limited Edition [CD + Goods] (BRCA-00072): This edition included a 13-page CD Jacket Desk Calendar with member photos.
- Pony Canyon BTS SHOP Edition [CD Only] (SCCA.00039): This was an Analog LP-sized Jacket edition with a large, full color photo insert.

== Music video and promotion ==
The teaser for the Korean version of the song was released by Big Hit Entertainment on November 25, 2015 (KST), and the music video was released on November 30, 2015. The video depicts the foolhardiness of youth, both within the context of joyful moments of friendship as well as in the midst of suffering and enduring through difficult life situations. It showcases not only the members' musical talents but also their acting abilities, with a narrative that connects to the music video for "I Need U" and the "화양연화 on stage : prologue" video. A music video for the Japanese version was uploaded to YouTube on March 11, 2016. Both versions were directed by Choi YongSeok from Lumpens with Ko Yoojung, Lee Wonju, Ko Hyunji, and Jung Noori serving as assistant directors. The director of photography was Nam Hyunwoo of GDW. Other personnel are Joo Byungik the focus puller, Song Hyunsuk who served as the gaffer, Song Kwangho working the jimmyjib, and Lee Moonyoung who provided art.

The "Run" music video, uploaded on both Big Hit Entertainment and 1theK’s YouTube channels, received nearly 2 million combined views in less than 24 hours, the fastest record achieved by BTS at the time.

BTS promoted the original version of the song on several Korean music programs, including Music Bank, Inkigayo, M Countdown, and Show Champion.

== Accolades ==
On December 7, 2015, the group received a weekly Melon Popularity Award for "Run". Later that month, Billboard ranked "Run" the third best K-pop song of 2015, where they wrote that it "found the perfect balance of their hardcore hip-hop style with sentimental leanings." They further added that "It's a song like this solidifies a group's place in K-pop." "Run" additionally achieved the top spots on the music programs The Show, Show Champion, and Music Bank.

Music program awards
Program	Date	Ref.
The Show	December 8, 2015	
Show Champion	December 9, 2015	
Show Champion	December 16, 2015	
Music Bank	December 11, 2015	
Music Bank	January 8, 2016	

== Track listing ==
Korean Version [Original]
No.	Title	Writer(s)	Producer(s)	Length
1.	"Run"	Pdogg; "Hitman" Bang; Rap Monster; Suga; V; Jungkook; J-Hope	Pdogg	3:57

Korean Version [Compilation album]
No.	Title	Writer(s)	Producer(s)	Length
1.	"Run" (Ballad Mix)	Pdogg; "Hitman" Bang; Rap Monster; Suga; V; Jungkook; J-Hope	Slow Rabbit	4:17
2.	"Run" (Alternative Mix)	Pdogg; "Hitman" Bang; Rap Monster; Suga; V; Jungkook; J-Hope	Pdogg	3:56

CD single – Japanese version
No.	Title	Writer(s)	Producer(s)	Length
1.	"Run" (Japanese Ver.)	Pdogg; Hitman Bang; RM; Suga; V; Jungkook; J-Hope	Pdogg	3:55
2.	"Butterfly" (Japanese Ver.)	Hitman Bang; Slow Rabbit; Pdogg; Brother Su; RM; Suga; J-Hope	Pdogg	4:04
Total length:				7:59

Bonus track [Regular] + [Shop Edition]
No.	Title	Writer(s)	Producer(s)	Length
3.	"Good Day"	Matt Cab; Ryuja; Suga; J-Hope; RM	Matt Cab; Ryuja	4:25
Total length:				12:24

== Personnel ==
Credits are adapted from the liner notes of The Most Beautiful Moment in Life: Young Forever (2016).

- "Hitman" Bang – songwriting
- J-Hope – songwriting
- Jeong Jaepil – guitar
- Jungkook – songwriting, chorus
- Pdogg – songwriting, production, keyboard, synthesizer, vocal & rap arrangement, record engineering @ Dogg Bounce
- Rap Monster – songwriting
- James F. Reynolds – mix engineering
- Slow Rabbit – production (Ballad mix)
- Suga – songwriting
- V – songwriting

== Charts ==
Chart performance for "Run"
Chart (2015)	Peak position
Japan (Oricon)	2
Japan (Japan Hot 100)	2
South Korea (Gaon)	8
US World Digital Songs (Billboard)	3

== Sales and certifications ==
Sales and certifications for "Run"
Region	Certification	Certified units/sales
Canada (Music Canada)	Platinum	80,000^{‡}
Japan (RIAJ) Japanese version	Gold	136,000
New Zealand (RMNZ)	Gold	15,000^{‡}
South Korea Original	—	623,482
South Korea Ballad Mix	—	38,314
South Korea Alternative Mix	—	23,391
United States (RIAA)	Platinum	1,000,000^{‡}
Streaming
Japan (RIAJ)	Platinum	100,000,000^{†}
^{‡} Sales+streaming figures based on certification alone.^{†} Streaming-only figures based on certification alone.

== Release history ==
Region	Release date	Format	Version	Label	Ref.
Various	November 30, 2015	Digital download	Original	Big Hit Entertainment	
Various	March 15, 2016	Digital download	Japanese	Big Hit; Pony Canyon	
Japan	March 15, 2016	CD; digital download	Japanese	Big Hit; Pony Canyon	
Various	May 2, 2016	Digital download	Remix	Big Hit	
