= The Most Beautiful Moment in Life, Pt. 2 =

- Blue version and digital cover

EP by BTS
- Released: November 30, 2015
- Recorded: 2015
- Genres: Hip-hop; R&B; dance-pop; pop
- Length: 34:09
- Languages: Korean; English
- Labels: Big Hit; Loen; Pony Canyon
- Producers: Pdogg; Slow Rabbit; "Hitman" Bang; Suga

BTS chronology
The Most Beautiful Moment in Life, Pt. 1 (2015)	The Most Beautiful Moment in Life, Pt. 2 (2015)	The Most Beautiful Moment in Life: Young Forever (2016)

Singles from The Most Beautiful Moment in Life, Pt. 2
- 1. "Run" Released: November 30, 2015

Korean title
- Hangul: 화양연화 pt.2
- Hanja: 花樣年華 pt.2
- RR: Hwayangyeonhwa pt.2
- MR: Hwayangyŏnhwa pt.2

Professional ratings
Review scores
Source	Rating
AllMusic	3.5/5 stars

The Most Beautiful Moment in Life, Pt. 2 (Korean: 화양연화 pt.2) is the fourth extended play (EP) by South Korean boy band BTS. It was released on November 30, 2015, by Big Hit Entertainment. Available in two versions, the EP comprises nine tracks, with "Run" as the lead single.

== Background and release ==
On September 8, 2015, Big Hit Entertainment released the “화양연화 on stage : prologue” video on Naver V LIVE, announcing their upcoming comeback and concert tour, 2015 BTS LIVE "The Most Beautiful Moment in Life On Stage". The prologue video included previews of the album tracks “Butterfly", “Ma City", and “Outro: House of Cards". In the video, it was indicated that the album release was originally scheduled for October; the release, however, was ultimately delayed to November 30. On November 17, an animated comeback trailer was uploaded on Big Hit Entertainment's YouTube channel, which featured the album track "Intro: Never Mind" performed by Suga, RM, and J-Hope. On November 19 and 20, short clips of each BTS member were uploaded onto their official Instagram account, with clues hinting at an upcoming event related to the album release. Subsequently, on November 20, Big Hit Entertainment announced the 'Butterfly Dream: BTS Open Media Exhibition' event, which was later hosted on December 1–8 in Seoul.

On November 23, BTS released the first set of album concept photos through their official Facebook and Instagram accounts, accompanied with the caption: "Je Ne Regrette Rien", which means "I regret nothing" in French. On November 24, a second set of concept photos was revealed with the caption: "Papillon", which translates to "butterfly." The album would be available in two cover design versions, Blue and Peach. Both versions would include a 98-page photobook, a random photocard, and one limited edition poster. On November 24, special bonus concept photos were released through Naver Music.

On November 25, a music video teaser for the album's lead single, "Run", was released through Big Hit Entertainment's official YouTube channel. On November 26, the album track list, containing nine songs, was shared on the group's official Twitter account, and the album preview was uploaded on YouTube. Additionally, short clips of behind the scenes footage from the "Run" music video was uploaded on the group's Instagram. On November 27, BTS released a track from the album, "Ma City", on their official homepage for free pre-streaming, available for a limited period of 24 hours. At the press conference for their concert held the same day, BTS stated: “Part one explained how youth is tiring and difficult, and it also touched on how we feel like we're always on edge. Part two will have a more adventurous and daring feel to it. That's why our title song is 'RUN'." The EP was released on November 30.

== Promotions ==
BTS held a press conference on November 27 to discuss the release of the new album and the beginning of their concert tour. On the same day, they performed the new songs from the album for the first time at the 2015 BTS LIVE "The Most Beautiful Moment in Life On Stage" concert at the SK Olympic Handball Gymnasium in Seoul. On December 1–8, BTS held the 'Butterfly Dream: BTS Open Media Exhibition', for which they invited six hundred fans to view the exhibits as well as to celebrate the release of the album. BTS began broadcast promotions on Mnet, with their first comeback stage performance held at the 2015 Mnet Asian Music Awards in Hong Kong. The group subsequently appeared on several domestic music programs, including The Show, Music Core, Show Champion, Inkigayo, and Music Bank. Promotions concluded with a final performance of "Run" aired on the January 3 broadcast of Inkigayo. The single was used as the theme for a Puma Korea advertisement after BTS became the spokesmodel for the brand.

== Commercial performance ==
On November 26, it was reported that pre-orders for The Most Beautiful Moment in Life, Part 2 had surpassed 150,000 copies, exceeding the group's previous record with The Most Beautiful Moment in Life, Part 1. The 2015 BTS LIVE "The Most Beautiful Moment in Life On Stage" concerts in Seoul, held from November 27–29, attracted 13,500 attendees overall, with tickets selling out immediately after they went on sale. The December 8 and 9 concert dates for Yokohama Arena in Japan were similarly successful, garnering 25,000 attendees in total.

Within the first week alone, sales for the EP reached nearly 90,000 copies on the Hanteo real-time album sales chart. It subsequently debuted at number one on the Gaon Weekly Album Chart for the period dated November 29–December 5, 2015, while all nine tracks from the extended play entered the corresponding issue of the Gaon Weekly Digital Chart for the same period. The EP topped the Gaon Monthly Album Chart for November, becoming the first BTS album to do so. It went on to become the fifth best-selling album of 2015 in South Korea, recording 274,135 copies sold on the year-end Gaon Album Chart.

In the United States, The Most Beautiful Moment in Life, Part 2 debuted at number 171 on the Billboard 200, with 5,000 copies sold, becoming the band's first release to enter the chart. It also peaked at number one on the Heatseekers Albums and World Albums charts. The EP spent four weeks at number one on the latter, making BTS the first K-pop act to have the same release spend more than one week atop the World ranking—it remained on the chart for 22 weeks. All nine of the EP's tracks simultaneously debuted on the World Digital Songs chart: "Run" at number 3, "Butterfly" at number 4, "Silver Spoon" at number 8, "Ma City" at number 9, "Dead Leaves" at number 10, "Outro: House Of Cards" at number 11, "Whalien 52" at number 14, and "Intro: Never Mind" at number 19, the most entries BTS had ever managed to chart up to that point. "Butterfly" additionally peaked at number 91 on the Billboard Philippines Hot 100.

== Accolades ==
Billboard ranked The Most Beautiful Moment in Life, Part 2 fourth on its list of "The 10 Best K-pop Albums of 2015". The list's contributing writers commented that "Pt. 2 solidifies BTS' place in the K-pop scene as the band not only showcased their emotional take on hip-hop with the single "RUN," but proved they aren't afraid to tackle topics typically avoided by most K-pop acts." The EP's lead single "Run" ranked third on the outlet's corresponding list of "The 20 Best K-pop Songs of 2015". In 2017, "Whalien 52" was included on its critics picks list of "The 40 Best K-Pop Deep Cuts of the Decade So Far", at number seven.

== Track listing ==
Credits adapted from Naver.

No.	Title	Writer(s)	Producer(s)	Length
1.	"Intro: Never Mind"	Slow Rabbit; Suga	Slow Rabbit	2:16
2.	"Run"	Pdogg; "Hitman" Bang; RM; Suga; V; Jung Kook; J-Hope	Pdogg	3:56
3.	"Butterfly"	"Hitman" Bang; Slow Rabbit; Pdogg; Brother Su	Pdogg	3:58
4.	"Whalien 52"	Pdogg; Brother Su; "Hitman" Bang; RM; Suga; J-Hope; Slow Rabbit	Pdogg	4:03
5.	"Ma City"	Pdogg; "Hitman" Bang; RM; Suga; J-Hope	Pdogg	4:16
6.	"뱁새" (Baepsae / Silver Spoon)	Pdogg; Supreme Boi; RM; Slow Rabbit	Pdogg	3:53
7.	"Skit: One Night in a Strange City"		Pdogg; "Hitman" Bang; Slow Rabbit	4:23
8.	"고엽" (Goyeop / Autumn Leaves)	Suga; Slow Rabbit; Jung Kook; "Hitman" Bang; RM; J-Hope; Pdogg	Suga; Slow Rabbit	4:27
9.	"Outro: House of Cards"	Slow Rabbit; Brother Su; "Hitman" Bang	Slow Rabbit	2:57
Total length:				34:09

== Charts ==
=== Weekly charts ===
Weekly chart performance
Chart (2015, 2022)	Peak position
Hungarian Albums (MAHASZ)	37
Japanese Albums (Oricon)	15
South Korean Albums (Gaon)	1
US Billboard 200	171
US Top Heatseekers	1
US Independent Albums (Billboard)	1
US Top Current Album Sales (Billboard)	98
US World Albums (Billboard)	1

=== Monthly charts ===
Monthly chart performance
Chart (2015)	Peak position
South Korean Albums (Gaon)	1

=== Year-end charts ===
Year-end chart positions for The Most Beautiful Moment in Life, Pt.2
Chart (2015)	Position
South Korean Albums (Gaon)	5
Chart (2016)	Position
South Korean Albums (Gaon)	21
US Billboard World Albums	9
Chart (2017)	Position
South Korean Albums (Gaon)	57
Chart (2018)	Position
South Korean Albums (Gaon)	57
Chart (2019)	Position
South Korean Albums (Gaon)	61
Chart (2020)	Position
South Korean Albums (Gaon)	88
Chart (2021)	Position
South Korean Albums (Gaon)	67

== Sales ==
Chart	Sales
South Korea (Gaon)	717,552
United States	5,000
Japan (Oricon)	14,051

== Release history ==
Country	Date	Format	Label
South Korea	November 30, 2015	CD, Digital download	Big Hit Entertainment
Various	November 30, 2015	CD, Digital download	Big Hit Entertainment

== See also ==
- List of K-pop songs on the Billboard charts
- List of K-pop albums on the Billboard charts
- List of Gaon Album Chart number ones of 2015
- List of Gaon Album Chart number ones of 2016
