= The Most Beautiful Moment in Life, Pt. 1 =

- Pink version and digital cover

EP by BTS
- Released: April 29, 2015
- Recorded: 2015
- Genres: Hip hop; R&B; dance-pop; EDM; pop
- Length: 31:27
- Languages: Korean; English
- Labels: Big Hit; Loen; Pony Canyon; Universal Music Taiwan
- Producers: Pdogg; Slow Rabbit; Suga; "hitman" bang; Jungkook

BTS chronology
Wake Up (2014)	The Most Beautiful Moment in Life, Pt. 1 (2015)	The Most Beautiful Moment in Life, Pt. 2 (2015)

Singles from The Most Beautiful Moment in Life, Pt. 1
- 1. "I Need U" Released: April 29, 2015; 2. "Dope" Released: June 24, 2015

Korean title
- Hangul: 화양연화 pt.1
- Hanja: 花樣年華 pt.1
- RR: Hwayangyeonhwa pt.1
- MR: Hwayangyŏnhwa pt.1

The Most Beautiful Moment in Life, Pt. 1 (Korean: 화양연화 pt.1) is the third extended play by South Korean boy band BTS. Released on April 29, 2015, by Big Hit Entertainment, the nine-track album was made available in two versions, with "I Need U" as its lead single and "Dope (It's awesome 쩔어)" as a promoted follow-up single.

== Background and release ==
Shifting their sound and image from solely aggressive, masculine hip hop to more diverse styles, BTS wanted to express the beauty and anxiousness of "youth" and settled on the title of "花樣年華" (Korean: 화양연화; RR: Hwayangyeonhwa), loosely interpreted to define "youth" as "the most beautiful moment in life." On April 6, 2015, BTS announced their comeback date for April 29, and revealed that all members participated in writing songs for the album. On April 17, an animated comeback trailer was uploaded on Big Hit Entertainment's official YouTube channel, which featured the album's intro track performed by Suga. On April 19, Big Hit Entertainment announced the title of the album, and the first set of member concept photos was posted on their official Twitter account. Along with the reveal of the second set of concept photos, it was stated that two different cover design versions of the album would be released, Pink and White. The album would also include a 120-page photobook and a random photo card. Big Hit Entertainment released the first music video teaser for the album's lead single "I Need U" on April 23. On April 26, the album's track list was revealed, and an album preview was uploaded on Big Hit Entertainment's YouTube channel. Two of the album's tracks, "Boyz with Fun" and "Converse High," had previously been previewed at the 2015 BTS Live Trilogy Episode I: BTS Begins concert held in Seoul on March 29.

On June 14, BTS posted concept photos for the follow-up promotion track "Dope (쩔어)" through their official Facebook page, captioned with the opening line of the song: “Welcome, first time with BTS?"

== Promotion ==
Two tracks from the album, "Boyz with Fun" and "Converse High", were deemed unfit for broadcast by KBS due to lyrics containing swears and brand names, such as Converse, Chanel, and Alexander McQueen. The latter track was also deemed unfit for broadcast by MBC. "I Need U" was approved for broadcast and BTS held their first comeback stage performance on M Countdown on April 30. A music video for the song was released that same day. On April 29, prior to the release of the music video at midnight, BTS broadcast a live comeback special, I NEED U, BTS ON AIR, through Naver Starcast. The group went on to successfully promote across multiple channels and various programs, including on KBS, MBC, SBS, and Arirang TV. BTS wrapped up promotions for "I Need U" with a final performance on the May 31 broadcast of Inkigayo.

On June 13, BTS announced plans to hold follow-up music show promotions with the track "Dope (쩔어)". A music video for the song was released on YouTube on June 24. It features each of the members dressed up to represent various occupations, such as a police officer or office worker, while dancing fast-paced choreography. The dance was choreographed by Keone Madrid, and the music video was produced and directed by GDW. BTS held their first performance of the song on the June 25 broadcast of M Countdown, and concluded promotions on July 5 with a final performance on Inkigayo. "Dope" gained considerable attention internationally as it became the subject of numerous reaction videos on YouTube, the most noteworthy being from the Fine Brothers channel, and went on to become BTS' first music video to surpass 100 million views on the platform. This made BTS the first K-pop group outside of the "big three" Korean entertainment agencies—SM, YG, and JYP—to achieve the feat.

== Commercial performance ==
The Most Beautiful Moment in Life, Part 1 debuted at number two on the Gaon Weekly Album Chart in South Korea and rose to number one the following week. It peaked at number two on the Monthly Album Chart in May. In China, BTS ranked number one for two consecutive weeks on the Gaon Weibo Chart, a weekly rank of the top 10 most popular Korean artists based on data gathered from China's most popular social media platform, Weibo. In Japan, the EP debuted at number 24 on the Oricon Weekly Album Chart and number 45 on the Oricon Monthly Album Chart. The EP ended 2015 as the sixth best-selling album of the year in South Korea, with 274,135 copies sold.

In the United States, the album debuted at number two on the Billboard World Albums Chart, peaked at number six on the Heatseekers Chart, and entered the Independent Albums Chart for the first time at number 20, all of which were the highest for any BTS album at the time. Six of the EP's songs debuted on the World Digital Songs chart, with "I Need U" ranking the highest at number four, followed by "Dope" at number 11, "Hold Me Tight" at number 12, "Boyz with Fun" at number 13, "Converse High" at number 15, and "Outro: Love is Not Over" at number 25. "Dope" peaked at number three in July after BTS completed promotions for the single.

== Accolades ==
Awards and nominations
Organization	Year	Award	Result	Ref.
Mnet Asian Music Awards	2015	Album of the Year	Nominated	
25th Seoul Music Awards	2016	Best Album (Bonsang)	Won	
30th Golden Disc Awards	2016	Disc Bonsang	Won	
30th Golden Disc Awards	2016	Disc Daesang	Shortlisted	
Soompi Awards	2016	Album of the Year	Nominated	
Circle Chart Music Awards	2016	Album of the Year – 2nd Quarter	Nominated	

== Track listing ==
Credits adapted from the liner notes of the physical album and from registered songs in KOMCA.

No.	Title	Writer(s)	Producer(s)	Length
1.	"Intro: The Most Beautiful Moment in Life" (Intro: Hwayangyeonhwa / Intro: 화양연화)	Slow Rabbit; Suga	Slow Rabbit; Suga	2:03
2.	"I Need U"	Pdogg; "Hitman" Bang; Rap Monster; Suga; J-Hope; Brother Su	Pdogg	3:31
3.	"Hold Me Tight" (Jabajwo / 잡아줘)	Slow Rabbit; Pdogg; V; Rap Monster; Suga; J-Hope	Slow Rabbit	4:35
4.	"Skit: Expectation!"		Pdogg; "Hitman" Bang	2:27
5.	"Dope" (Jjeoreo / 쩔어)	Pdogg; Gwis Bang Mang; "Hitman" Bang; Rap Monster; Suga; J-Hope	Pdogg	4:00
6.	"Boyz With Fun" (Heungtan sonyeondan / 흥탄소년단)	Suga; Pdogg; "Hitman" Bang; Rap Monster; J-Hope; Jin; Jimin; V	Suga; Pdogg	4:04
7.	"Converse High"	Pdogg; Slow Rabbit; Rap Monster; Suga; J-Hope	Pdogg; Slow Rabbit	3:29
8.	"Moving On" (Isa / 이사)	Pdogg; Rap Monster; Suga; J-Hope	Pdogg	4:52
9.	"Outro: Love Is Not Over"	Jungkook; Slow Rabbit; Pdogg; Jin	Jungkook; Slow Rabbit	2:23
Total length:				31:24

== Charts ==
=== Weekly charts ===
Weekly chart performance
Chart (2015–2026)	Peak position
Belgium Albums (Ultratop Flanders)	172
Belgium Albums (Ultratop Wallonia)	180
Japanese Albums (Oricon)	24
South Korean Albums (Gaon)	1
US Independent Albums (Billboard)	1
US Top Heatseekers (Billboard)	6
US World Albums (Billboard)	2
Japanese edition
Japanese Albums (Oricon)	9

=== Monthly charts ===
Monthly chart performance
Chart (2015)	Peak position
Japanese Albums (Oricon)	45
Chart (2016)	Peak position
South Korean Albums (Gaon)	1

=== Year-end charts ===
Year-end chart performance
Chart (2015)	Position
South Korean Albums (Gaon)	6
Chart (2016)	Position
South Korean Albums (Gaon)	25
Chart (2017)	Position
South Korean Albums (Gaon)	60
Chart (2018)	Position
South Korean Albums (Gaon)	59
Chart (2019)	Position
South Korean Albums (Gaon)	69
Chart (2020)	Position
South Korean Albums (Gaon)	99
Chart (2021)	Position
South Korean Albums (Gaon)	78

== Sales ==
Chart	Sales
South Korea (Gaon)	602,446
Japan (Oricon)	JPN Edition: 5,019+; KOR Edition: 7,042+
United States	2,000+

== Release history ==
Country	Date	Format	Label	Edition
Various	April 29, 2015	CD; Digital download	Big Hit; Loen	Regular
South Korea	April 29, 2015	CD	Big Hit; Loen	Regular
Taiwan	June 2, 2015	CD; DVD	Universal Music Taiwan	Taiwan
Japan	September 16, 2015	CD; DVD	Pony Canyon	Japan

== See also ==
- List of K-pop songs on the Billboard charts
- List of K-pop albums on the Billboard charts
- List of Gaon Album Chart number ones of 2015
- List of Gaon Album Chart number ones of 2016
