= BTS: Yet to Come in Cinemas =

2023 concert film directed by Oh Yoon-dong

- Theatrical release poster
- Hangul: 방탄소년단 옛 투 컴 인 시네마
- RR: Bangtansonyeondan yet tu keom in sinema
- MR: Pangt'ansonyŏndan yet t'u k'ŏm in sinema
- Directed by: Oh Yoon-dong
- Starring: RM; Jin; Suga; J-Hope; Jimin; V; Jungkook
- Music by: BTS
- Production companies: Hybe; CJ 4DPlex; Trafalgar Releasing
- Distributed by: Trafalgar Releasing
- Release date: February 1, 2023
- Running time: 104 minutes
- Country: South Korea
- Language: Korean
- Box office: $53 million

BTS: Yet to Come in Cinemas is a 2023 South Korean concert film directed by Oh Yoon-dong and produced by Hybe, CJ 4DPlex, and Trafalgar Releasing. It was released on February 1, 2023, in select countries, with distribution handled by Trafalgar Releasing. The film takes place during the "BTS: Yet To Come in Busan" concert at the Busan Asiad Main Stadium, in South Korea.

== Synopsis ==
The 104-minute film features South Korean boy band BTS in a special cinematic cut of their "Yet To Come in Busan" concert, re-edited and remixed for movie theaters. The film features hit songs from across the group's career, including "Dynamite", "Butter" and "Idol", plus their first performance of the song "Run BTS" (Korean: 달려라 방탄), from the group's first anthology album Proof.

== Background ==
The "BTS: Yet To Come in Busan" concert that was held on October 15, 2022, was their contribution to promoting Busan's bid for World Expo 2030. The free concert was a huge success and held a lot of sentimental value to fans, given that their mandatory enlistment for the military was announced two days after the concert.

The film was first announced on December 20, 2022, with tickets going on sale on January 10 and 11. The trailer for the film was released on January 16, 2023. The film was officially released on February 1, 2023, in 110 countries.

== Reception ==
=== Box office ===
Following the film release, it was reported that BTS: Yet to Come in Cinemas was the highest-grossing event cinema release worldwide, reaching $53 million, after previously reaching $40 million.
