= BTS: Bon Voyage =

South Korean reality travel series

- Hangul: BTS 본보야지
- RR: BTS Bonboyaji
- MR: BTS Ponboyaji
- Genre: Reality series
- Starring: BTS
- Opening theme: "Fire" (season 1); "Not Today" (season 2); "Idol" (season 3); "Boy with Luv" (season 4)
- Country of origin: South Korea
- Original language: Korean
- No. of seasons: 4
- No. of episodes: 32

Original release
- Network: V Live+ (seasons 1–3); Weverse (season 4)
- Release: July 5, 2016 – present

BTS: Bon Voyage (stylized as BTS Bon Voyage, Korean: BTS 본보야지) is a South Korean reality show that has aired since 2016, starring South Korean boy band BTS. The program follows the members of the group as they visit different countries around the world. For each season, several behind-the-scenes episodes were also uploaded online.

== Episodes ==
=== Series overview ===
Season	Episodes	Location	Originally released	
Season	Episodes	Location	First released	Last released
1	8	Norway, Sweden and Finland	July 5, 2016	August 23, 2016
2	8	United States – Hawaii	June 27, 2017	August 15, 2017
3	8	Malta	September 18, 2018	November 6, 2018
4	8	New Zealand	November 19, 2019	January 7, 2020

=== Season one ===
No. overall	No. in season	Title	Original release date
1	0	"Epi. 00"	June 22, 2016
2	1	"Surprise Party" (Korean: 서프라이즈 파티)	July 5, 2016
3	2	"What happened? (with Taetae's adventures)" (Korean: 생긴 일 (with 태태의 모험))	July 12, 2016
4	3	"A fun and playful tour over mountains and seas" (Korean: 산 넘고 물 건너 좌충우돌 투어)	July 19, 2016
5	4	"BTS's lucky day" (Korean: 방탄의 운수 좋은 날)	July 26, 2016
6	5	"The cheerful BTS's cruise party" (Korean: '제대로’ 흥탄소년단의 선상파티)	August 2, 2016
7	6	"Romanticism in a camper van" (Korean: 캠핑카의 로망)	August 9, 2016
8	7	"The cheeky boys visit Finland" (Korean: 비글들의 핀란드 체험기)	August 16, 2016
9	8	"Christmas in Summer" (Korean: 한 여름의 크리스마스)	August 23, 2016

The first season of BTS Bon Voyage aired on V Live+ from July 5 to August 23, 2016, for a total of eight episodes, during which the group visited three Scandinavian countries—Norway, Sweden, and Finland—to celebrate their three-year career. The destination was chosen by the production team after hearing the singers' opinions.

After packing their bags, six members of BTS head to the airport to catch their flight to Bergen, Norway, while V leaves the following day as he is busy filming Hwarang. Upon landing in Norway, Jimin forgets his suitcase on the airport shuttle, but manages to retrieve it with the help of RM, who explains the situation in English to the transport company. Once the beds have been assigned in the hostel where they are staying, the members organize a party for Jungkook's coming of age.

The following day, BTS go to watch a parade before splitting into two groups and climbing one of the city's mountains. Returning to Bergen by cable car, they are joined by V for dinner. On the third day, they take a boat trip to the Sognefjord and the nearby village of Flåm. With the help of the staff, BTS make V believe that his bag, containing his documents, has been lost. After moving to Stockholm, Sweden, the following morning, the group split up to find the hotel, asking locals for directions, and explored the city until evening. On the fifth day, while his bandmates are touring Gamla Stan, RM goes to the embassy to obtain a travel permit because he has lost his passport, but after a cruise to Helsinki, Finland, he is forced to return to South Korea ahead of schedule.

In Finland, the six remaining members enjoy camping while traveling by camper van to Rovaniemi, and then explored the town by bicycle. After playing in a sauna, they receive letters from their managers and producer Bang Si-hyuk, as well as a video letter from RM in Korea. The group then ends their trip at Santa Claus Village.

=== Season two ===
No. overall	No. in season	Title	Original release date
10	1	"Aloha, Hawaii!" (Korean: 알로하~ 하와이!)	June 27, 2017
11	2	"Henné, turtles, key chains" (Korean: 헤나, 거북이, 열쇠고)	July 4, 2017
12	3	"Shouting BTS in the heart of Hawaii" (Korean: 하와이의 중심에서 BTS를 외치다)	July 11, 2017
13	4	"BTS's first helicopter experience" (Korean: 방탄이들의 생애 첫 헬기 체험)	July 18, 2017
14	5	"Mission! Find the accommodation!" (Korean: 미션! 숙소를 찾아라!)	July 25, 2017
15	6	"The night in Waikiki is more beautiful than your day" (Korean: 와이키키의 밤은 당신의 낮보다 아름답다)	August 1, 2017
16	7	"Enjoy hula" (Korean: Enjoy 훌라댄스)	August 8, 2017
17	8	"If you believe, count one, two, three" (Korean: 믿는다면 하나 둘 셋)	August 15, 2017

The second season aired on V Live+ from June 27 to August 15, 2017, for a total of eight episodes, during which the group visited Hawaii at the end of the American leg of The Wings Tour on a trip themed around the friendship between the members. During their stay in the archipelago, BTS went snorkeling, visited Akaka Falls, and visited Hawaii Volcanoes National Park. Moving from the island of Hawaii to Oahu, they swam with sharks and toured the Jurassic Park theme park on quad bikes. The trip ended on a yacht, where the group members read letters to each other and watched a commemorative video of the main stages of their career.

=== Season three ===
No. overall	No. in season	Title	Original release date
18	0	"Ep. 00"	September 12, 2018
19	1	"Let's go to the Mediterranean Sea!" (Korean: 우리는 지중해로 간다!)	September 18, 2018
20	2	"Hello, Malta!"	September 25, 2018
21	3	"A night in Valletta full of friendship" (Korean: 우정이 넘치는 발레타의 밤)	October 2, 2018
22	4	"7-1=7"	October 9, 2018
23	5	"The Road to Becoming Camping Masters" (Korean: 캠핑 고수로 가는 길)	October 16, 2018
24	6	"Separately and Together" (Korean: 따로, 또 같이)	October 23, 2018
25	7	"I Know What I Am"	October 30, 2018
26	8	"A Very Special Dinner" (Korean: 아주 특별한 저녁 식사)	November 6, 2018

The third season aired on V Live+ from September 18 to November 6, 2018, for a total of eight episodes, during which the group visited Malta. Initially, only six of the BTS members left for the trip, as V had to stay in Korea for a while longer for personal reasons. He joined the others in the fourth episode, and at the same time, Suga had to return home for family reasons.

During the program, the group explored Valletta, took a ferry to Gozo to learn scuba diving, visited Popeye Village and Mdina, and went fishing and camping. Both V and Jungkook also improvised solo performances by busking on the streets.

As in previous editions, at the end of the trip, BTS wrote letters addressed to their future selves, which were opened during a dinner in a suspended restaurant, before ending the evening at the amusement park

The Maltese tourism authority attributed a 237% increase in the number of Korean tourists visiting Malta in the first five months of 2019 due to the third season of the show.

=== Season four ===
No. overall	No. in season	Title	Original release date
27	0	"Ep. 00"	November 13, 2019
28	1	"The Beginning of an Exciting Journey" (Korean: 설레는 여행의 시작)	November 19, 2019
29	2	"What is youth for BTS?" (Korean: 방탄에게 청춘이란?)	November 28, 2019
30	3	"The stars that belong only to you" (Korean: 그대만의 별)	December 3, 2019
31	4	"Winter that came in September" (Korean: 9월에 찾아온 겨울)	December 10, 2019
32	5	"Let’s jump!"	December 17, 2019
33	6	"The story of BTS's friendship" (Korean: BTS의 우정 스토리)	December 24, 2019
34	7	"The happy moments of the seven" (Korean: 일곱 명의 행복한 시간)	December 31, 2019
35	8	"The light of each other" (Korean: 서로가 본 서로의 빛)	January 7, 2020

The fourth season aired on Weverse from November 19, 2019, to January 7, 2020, for a total of eight episodes, during which the group visited New Zealand.

A month before the trip, BTS meets with staff at a restaurant to choose the places to visit and the accommodations to stay in. On the day of departure, due to a problem with his documents, Jin is forced to board a different plane, landing directly at Auckland Airport, while the other members of the group make a stopover in Singapore and then head to Christchurch Airport, where the seven boys reunite. They then rent a camper van and an SUV from a car rental company and head to their first accommodation, a guesthouse on the slopes of a mountain. The next day, they visit the outdoor observatory of the University of Canterbury on Mount John, and during the trip, J-Hope falls victim to a candid camera prank that makes him believe he has been forgotten by the gas station attendant. The morning after stargazing, BTS set off on an excursion to Mount Cook, stopping off at Lake Pukaki.

This is followed by two days of camping, with the group members spending the nights in tents, relaxing during the day at a spa, and bungee jumping from the Nevis Highwire Platform over the Nevis River. They then fly by helicopter to the snow-capped mountains, go horseback riding, and fish for salmon on Lake Taupō. The final stop on the trip is Queenstown: after racing together on the city's toboggan run, BTS split up to spend their free time in different ways. Jin, Suga, and Jungkook go fishing, RM, J-Hope, and Jimin go cycling, and V visits the art gallery, before ending by sharing their impressions of the trip.

== Reception ==
In a 2021 round-up of the band's various reality series over the years, Kayti Burt from Den of Geek said it was "interesting to see the members out and about in the world, having fun together and on a relative break." Ananya Swaroop of August Man says the show "is as engaging as their songs", while Pujya Doss of Pinkvilla says, "Each episode is filled with laughter, challenges, and heartwarming scenes highlighting their friendship," and that the show is "for anyone who wants to see more of their personalities and the strong bond they share."
