= Philanthropy of BTS =

Activities of a Korean band

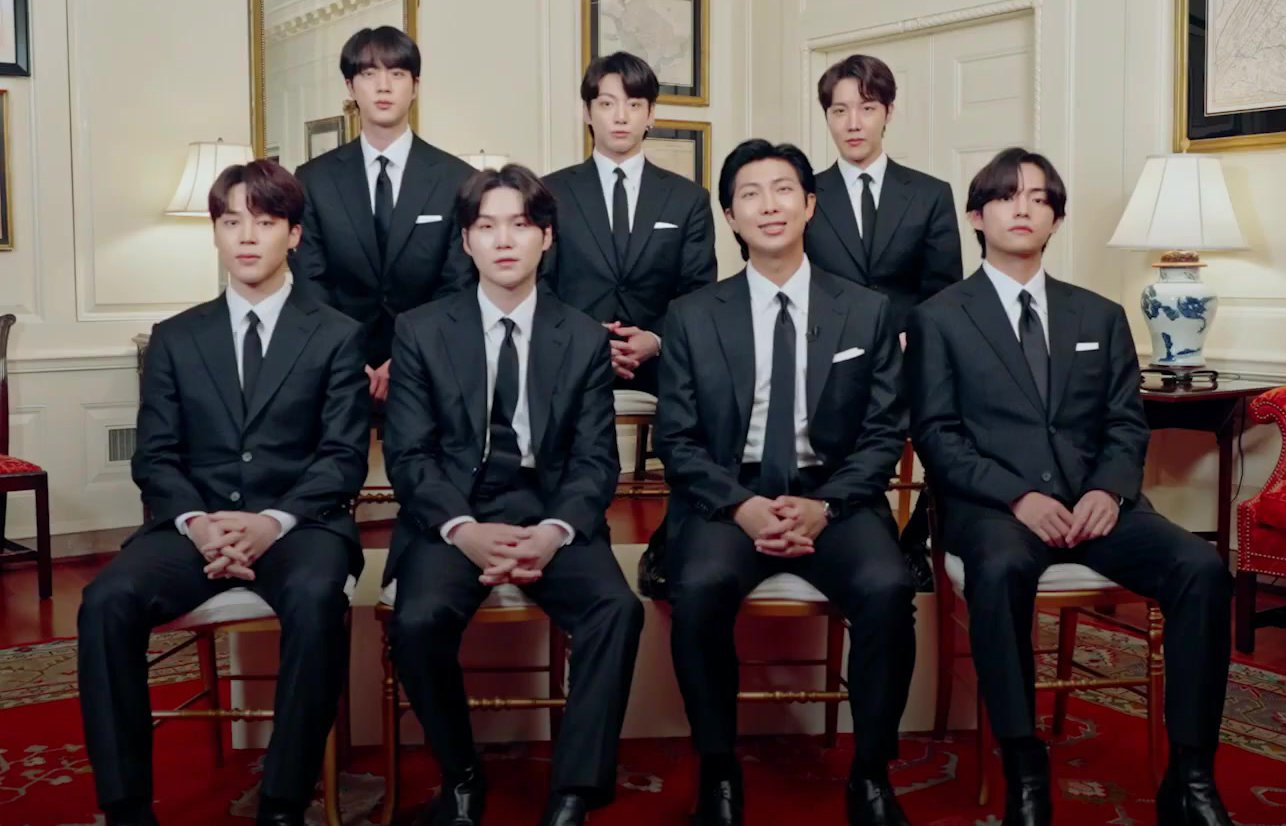
BTS during their visit to the White House for Asian American and Pacific Islander Heritage Month in 2022

South Korean boy band BTS are known for their philanthropic endeavors. Multiple members of the band have been inducted into prestigious donation clubs, such as the UNICEF Honors Club and the Green Noble Club, in acknowledgement of the size and frequency of their donations. They have also received awards for their donations, with one member receiving a Patron of the Arts Award for donations to the arts, and BTS as a whole receiving a UNICEF Inspire Award for their Love Myself campaign. They often donate privately, with their patronage later being made public by the organizations they support and the media. The band's efforts have motivated their fans to also engage in various charitable and humanitarian activities, and on occasion even match their donations.

== History ==
=== 2015–2017: Early activities ===
In 2015, BTS donated seven tons (7,187 kg) of rice to charity at the K-Star Road opening ceremony held in Apgujeong-dong. The rice had been collected from rice wreaths sent by fans worldwide in support of the group's 2015 BTS LIVE "Hwa Yang Yeon Hwa on stage" concert the previous month.

The following year they participated in ALLETS's "Let's Share the Heart" collaboration charity campaign with Naver to raise donations for LISA, a Korean medical charity which promotes organ and blood donation.

In 2017, BTS and Big Hit Entertainment donated KR₩100 million (US$87,915) to the 4/16 Sewol Families for Truth and A Safer Society, an organization connected to the families of the sinking of MV Sewol in 2014. Each member donated ₩10 million and Big Hit donated an additional ₩30 million. The donation was intended to have been made in secret. Later that year, BTS officially launched their Love Myself campaign, an initiative dedicated to funding several social programs to prevent violence against children and teens and to provide support for victims of violence in partnership with the Korean Committee for UNICEF.

=== 2018–present: Other philanthropic ventures ===
In April 2018, BTS participated in Stevie Wonder's "Dream Still Lives" tribute to Martin Luther King Jr. That June, the band donated to the ALS hospital building fund. In September, BTS attended the United Nations 73rd General Assembly for the launch of the youth initiative "Youth 2030: The UN Youth Strategy" and its corresponding UNICEF campaign "Generation Unlimited". According to UNICEF, the goal of the initiative is "to provide quality education and training for young people". BTS were selected to attend due to their impact on youth culture through their music and social messages, previous philanthropic endeavors, and popularity among the 15-to-25-year-old age demographic.

Starbucks Korea partnered with BTS in January 2020, for their "Be the Brightest Stars" campaign that included limited-edition beverages, food, and merchandise exclusive to South Korea. A portion of the profits from the campaign went towards career and educational development programs for disadvantaged youth as part of The Beautiful Foundation's Opportunity Youth Independence Project. Later that month, BTS participated in the Grammy week MusiCares charity auction event hosted by Julien's Auctions. The band autographed and submitted a set of seven microphones—the first-ever authorized items from them to be brought to auction—used between 2017 and 2019 during their Love Yourself World Tour. Initially estimated to raise between $10,000–20,000, the lot sold for $83,200, more than eight times its starting price and the highest of the event. All proceeds were donated to MusiCares, a non-profit organization that focuses on human service issues directly impacting the health and welfare of the music community. In June, BTS and Big Hit donated $1 million towards the Black Lives Matter movement, in the wake of the murder of George Floyd; the band's fans matched the donation within 24 hours. The band later donated $1 million to Live Nation's Crew Nation campaign to support live music personnel during the COVID-19 pandemic.

With the continuation of the pandemic into 2021, BTS participated in another MusiCares fundraising auction held on January 29. The band donated a collection of outfits from their "Dynamite" music video that were projected to raise between $20,000–40,000. The ensembles auctioned for $162,500—over eight times original estimates—as the top-selling item of the event. BTS also donated seven outfits from their "Life Goes On" music video to the Grammy week charity auction hosted by Charitybuzz in March. Valued at $30,000, bidding took place from March 8–23, with proceeds going towards the non-profit Grammy Museum Foundation's music education initiatives. In October, the band contributed the custom Louis Vuitton suits worn for their "Dynamite" performance during the 2021 Grammy Awards, a set of rings worn by J-Hope for the same performance, and a signed Epiphone 56 Les Paul Pro electric guitar to another MusiCares relief auction that was hosted by Julien's on January 30, 2022, as a precursor to the Grammy Awards in April. Estimated to raise between $30,000–50,000, the suits sold for $160,000, while the rings sold for over $24,000 collectively, and the guitar for $64,000.

== Love Myself campaign ==
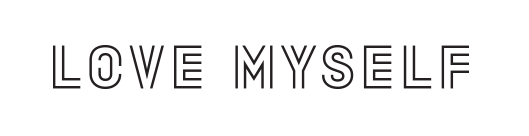
Logo for BTS' Love Myself anti-violence campaign

The Love Myself campaign was launched on November 1, 2017, in partnership with the Korean and Japanese committees for UNICEF. BTS became the first artist in South Korea to raise funds as part of a social fund for global campaigns. The idea was introduced by the band as a sponsorship to #ENDviolence, a global UNICEF campaign aimed at the protection of young people so they can live without the fear of violence, and promotes the hashtag #BTSLoveMyself, which asks fans and supporters to post self-loving photos with the hashtag to different social media platforms. As of October 2021, the campaign has generated 5 million tweets and over 50 million engagements.

BTS introduced donation platforms in collaboration with KakaoTalk in January 2018, as well as official stickers for the campaign. A partnership with the Japan Committee for UNICEF was announced five months later, through a partnership agreement ceremony held in Tokyo. BTS later attended the 73rd session of the United Nations General Assembly in New York on September 24, for the launch ceremony of UNICEF's global partnership, Generation Unlimited, a program "dedicated to increasing opportunities and investments for children and young people aged 10 to 24". On behalf of the band, BTS' leader RM delivered a six-minute speech in English about self-acceptance and the Love Myself campaign.

In March 2021, BTS and Big Hit released a joint video statement with UNICEF and UNICEF Korea, announcing their renewed support of the campaign for two more years. Love Myself was "elevated to a multinational MCA partnership", marking the first time that a Korea-based partnership had been expanded to a "global trilateral partnership with UNICEF headquarters". The band pledged an additional $500,000 per year to UNICEF Korea. BTS also became sponsors of the global #ENDViolence campaign, dedicating a portion of income from their campaign merchandise and the Love Yourself album series sales to it; a further $1 million donation was promised to UNICEF Korea by 2022. On September 22, 2023, Big Hit announced a donation of ₩1 billion (US$746,114.98) to the Korean UNICEF committee in appreciation of BTS and their fanbase, ARMY; the contribution is also part of the Love Myself campaign.

In April 2024, the #OnMyMind initiative, created to help improve and support the mental health of youth around the world, was introduced as the campaign's second chapter.

=== Funding ===
The campaign is funded in the following ways:

- ₩500 million donated by Big Hit and the seven members of BTS
- 3% of all income from physical album sales of the Love Yourself series (Her, Tear, and Answer)
- 100% of all sales of official Love Myself campaign goods
- Part of the income from the sales of official KakaoTalk Give-ticon and LINE stickers for the Love Myself campaign
- Kakao's contribution platform "Together Value with Kakao"
- Naver's online donation platform "Happy Bean"
- Donations received through donation desks installed by UNICEF
- $500,000 per year donated by BTS for two years, beginning 2021

Proceeds are used to support young victims of school violence, domestic violence, and sexual assault around the world, as well as to provide education programs for local communities in aid of violence prevention.

=== Accomplishments ===
The campaign raised an additional ₩106 million within just two months of its launch—by January 17, 2018—taking the global funds total to ₩606 million. In November 2018, UNICEF Korea announced that over ₩1.6 billion ($1.4 million) had been raised. By June 2019, cumulative worldwide funds had surpassed ₩2.4 billion.

By December 2020, the #BTSLoveMyself hashtag had been used across social media over 14 million times, with the campaign's global funds totalling ₩3.2 billion ($2.8 million). This number rose to ₩4.2 billion ($3.67 million) by October 2021. Per an April 2024 campaign update, over $6.6 million has been raised between the band and its fans as of March 2024.

By the campaign's conclusion in 2025, it had raised approximately ₩9.3 billion over eight years.

=== Accolades ===
The Love Myself campaign won a UNICEF Inspire Award in the 'Best Integrated Campaigns and Events' category at the 2020 UNICEF Inspire Awards. Held annually by UNICEF Headquarters, the ceremony honours the "most innovative and inspiring" global UNICEF campaigns of the year across 18 categories. The 'Integrated Campaigns and Events' category awards campaigns that have generated the biggest influence and inspiration in areas including promoting children's rights, fundraising, and public relations. For the 2020 edition, 100 campaigns across 50 countries were considered, with winners selected through a combination of online votes by UNICEF employees worldwide and the evaluation of a judges' panel.

In December 2025, BTS received a Presidential Commendation at the 5th Korea Good Donation Awards for the Love Myself campaign, becoming the first Korean singers to receive the honor.
