= Ateez discography =

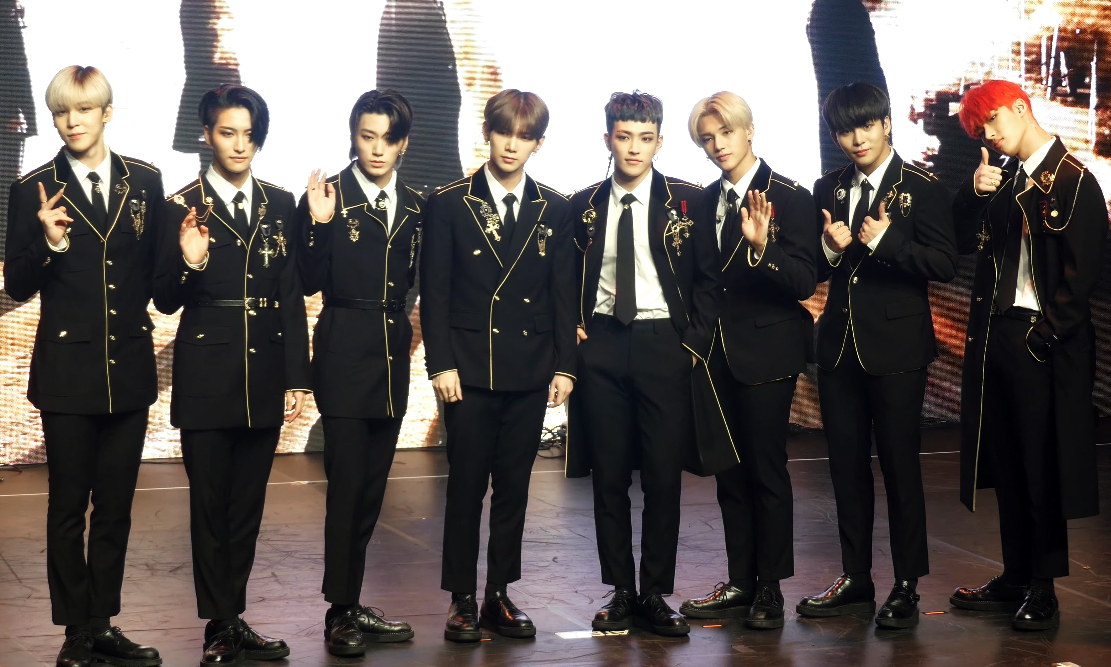
- Studio albums: 5
- EPs: 18
- Singles: 42
- Music videos: 26
- Soundtrack appearances: 2

South Korean boy group Ateez have released five studio albums, eighteen extended plays and forty-two singles. They debuted in October 2018 with Treasure EP.1: All to Zero, the first of the five-part Korean-language Treasure album series. They caught international attention early in their career, which their second EP, Treasure EP.2: Zero to One, landed at number seven on the Billboard's Heatseekers Albums Chart and number five on the World Albums Chart. Studio album Treasure EP.Fin: All to Action became their first to top the South Korea Gaon Album Chart. The group released the first Japanese-language album Treasure EP.Extra: Shift the Map in December 2019.

Ateez later released the Fever EP series in four instalments. Their July 2020 release Zero: Fever Part.1 was the first to be certified platinum by the Korea Music Content Association. The next EPs, Zero: Fever Part.2 and Zero: Fever Part.3, were both certified double platinum in 2021. Zero: Fever Part.3 and Zero: Fever Epilogue charted at number 42 and 73 respectively on the Billboard 200 main chart in the United States. Ateez have sold over eleven million physical albums worldwide. They were the 10th best album selling male artist in South Korea in 2020, and the 8th overall best album seller in the country in 2021.

In 2022, the group started with the release of The World series. The World EP.1: Movement, The World EP.2: Outlaw and The World EP.Fin: Will charted at Nos. 3, 2 and 1 on the Billboard 200 chart, respectively. The World EP.2: Outlaw earned them their first top 10 entry on the UK Official Albums Chart and The World EP.Fin: Will debuted at No.2 on the chart. All three releases sold over 1 million copies.

In 2024, the group released their first album in the Golden Hour series. Golden Hour: Part.1, Part.2, Part.3 and Part.4, all debuted in the top 3 of the Billboard 200. Both Golden Hour: Part.1 and Part.2 reached No. 4 on the UK Official Albums Chart, making them the first K-pop group to achieve four consecutive top 10 albums in the UK. The group achieved their first entries on the Billboard Hot 100, with the singles "Lemon Drop" from Golden Hour: Part.3 and "In Your Fantasy" from its follow-up edition debuting at No. 69 and No. 68, respectively. The EPs Golden Hour: Part.1, Part.2 and Part.4 earned million-seller certifications within their first week of release.

== Albums ==
=== Studio albums ===
==== Korean albums ====
List of Korean studio albums, with selected chart positions, sales and certifications
Title	Details	Peak chart positions										Sales	Certifications
Title	Details	KOR	AUS Dig.	FRA Dig.	GER	HUN	JPN	UK	US	US Heat.	US World	Sales	Certifications
Treasure EP.Fin: All to Action	Released: October 8, 2019; Label: KQ Entertainment; Formats: CD, digital download, streaming	1	32	53	—	15	—	— (Note: Treasure EP.Fin: All to Action did not enter the UK Albums Chart, but it peaked at number 64 on the component UK Album Downloads Chart.)	—	10	7	KOR: 248,581; US: 1,000	
The World EP.Fin: Will	Released: December 1, 2023; Label: KQ Entertainment, RCA, Legacy; Formats: CD, digital download, streaming	1	—	—	11	21	3	2	1	—	1	KOR: 1,798,803; JPN: 87,422 (Phy.); US: 146,000	KMCA: Million; KMCA: Platinum (Mini)
"—" denotes releases that did not chart or were not released in that region.

==== Japanese albums ====
List of Japanese studio albums, with selected chart positions and sales
Title	Details	Peak chart positions		Sales
Title	Details	JPN	US World	Sales
Treasure EP.Extra: Shift the Map	Released: December 4, 2019; Label: Nippon Columbia; Formats: CD, CD+DVD, digital download, streaming; Track listing: 1. "Hearts Awakened, Live Alive" (Expression Revisited); 2. "Hala Hala" (Traditional Treatment mix); 3. "Pirate King" (Overload mix); 4. "Treasure" (Smoothing Harmonies mix); 5. "Utopia" (Japanese version); 6. "Say My Name" (Flavor of Latin with Juwon Park); 7. "Illusion" (Chillin' with Buddy mix); 8. "Wave" (Ollounder's Bold Dynamics mix); 9. "Aurora" (Japanese version); 10. "Twilight" (Classic Buddy mix); 11. "Promise" (Notation from Senor Juwon Park)	9	—	JPN: 13,390 (Phy.)
Into the A to Z	Released: March 24, 2021 (JPN); Label: Nippon Columbia; Formats: CD, CD+DVD, digital download, streaming; Track listing: 1. "Pirate King" (Japanese version); 2. "Say My Name" (Japanese version); 3. "Utopia" (Japanese version); 4. "Aurora" (Japanese version); 5. "Wonderland" (Japanese version); 6. "Answer" (Japanese version); 7. "Better"; 8. "Thanxx" (Japanese version); 9. "Inception" (Japanese version); 10. "Still Here"	6	—	JPN: 11,868 (Phy.)
Ashes to Light	Released: September 17, 2025 (JPN); Label: Universal; Formats: CD, digital download, streaming	1	3	JPN: 115,428 (Phy.)
"—" denotes releases that did not chart or were not released in that region.

== Extended plays ==
=== Korean extended plays ===
List of Korean extended plays, with selected chart positions, sales and certifications
Title	Details	Peak chart positions										Sales	Certifications
Title	Details	KOR	AUS Dig.	BEL (FL)	CAN	HUN	JPN	UK	US	US Heat.	US World	Sales	Certifications
Treasure EP.1: All to Zero	Released: October 24, 2018 (KOR); Label: KQ Entertainment; Formats: CD, digital download, streaming	7	—	153	—	39	—	—	—	—	9	KOR: 108,161; US: 10,000	
Treasure EP.2: Zero to One	Released: January 15, 2019; Label: KQ Entertainment; Formats: CD, digital download, streaming	6	—	—	—	—	—	—	—	7	5	KOR: 128,119; US: 1,000	
Treasure EP.3: One to All	Released: June 10, 2019; Label: KQ Entertainment; Formats: CD, digital download, streaming	2	35	180	—	14	25	—	—	9	8	KOR: 214,081; JPN: 4,370 (Phy.); US: 1,000	
Treasure Epilogue: Action to Answer	Released: January 6, 2020; Label: KQ Entertainment; Formats: CD, digital download, streaming	1	—	144	—	19	31	—	—	18	5	KOR: 208,123; JPN: 1,472 (Phy.); US: 3,000	
Zero: Fever Part.1	Released: July 29, 2020; Label: KQ Entertainment; Formats: CD, digital download, streaming	1	—	41	—	9	9	—	—	—	6	KOR: 430,226; JPN: 10,845 (Phy.)	KMCA: Platinum
Zero: Fever Part.2	Released: March 1, 2021; Label: KQ Entertainment; Formats: CD, digital download, streaming	1	—	113	—	18	10	—	—	9	8	KOR: 533,066; JPN: 11,254 (Phy.)	KMCA: 2× Platinum
Zero: Fever Part.3	Released: September 13, 2021; Label: KQ Entertainment, RCA, Legacy; Formats: CD, digital download, streaming	2	—	47	—	14	9	— (Note: Zero: Fever Part.3 did not enter the UK Albums Chart, but it peaked at number 28 on the component UK Album Downloads Chart.)	42	—N/a (Note: Ineligible after charting on Billboard 200.)	1	KOR: 755,410; JPN: 15,921 (Phy.)	KMCA: 3× Platinum
Zero: Fever Epilogue	Released: December 10, 2021; Label: KQ Entertainment, RCA, Legacy; Formats: CD, digital download, streaming	1	—	35	—	17	9	—	73	—N/a	1	KOR: 458,972; JPN: 18,124 (Phy.)	KMCA: Platinum
The World EP.1: Movement	Released: July 29, 2022; Label: KQ Entertainment, RCA, Legacy; Formats: CD, digital download, streaming	1	15	21	—	19	4	— (Note: The World EP.1: Movement did not enter the UK Albums Chart, but it peaked at number 19 on the component UK Album Downloads Chart.)	3	—N/a	1	KOR: 1,007,996; JPN: 42,057; US: 100,000	KMCA: Million
The World EP.2: Outlaw	Released: June 16, 2023; Label: KQ Entertainment, RCA, Legacy; Formats: CD, digital download, streaming	1	—	3	—	12	1	10	2	—N/a	1	KOR: 1,501,632; JPN: 83,243 (Phy.); US: 101,000	KMCA: Million; KMCA: Platinum (Minirecord)
Golden Hour: Part.1	Released: May 31, 2024; Label: KQ Entertainment, RCA, Legacy; Formats: CD, digital download, streaming	1	—	25	—	35	1	4	2	—N/a	1	KOR: 1,658,284; JPN: 42,665; US: 191,000	KMCA: Million
Golden Hour: Part.2	Released: November 15, 2024; Label: KQ Entertainment, RCA, Legacy; Formats: CD, digital download, streaming	1	—	—	94	—	3	4	1	—N/a	1	KOR: 1,501,351; JPN: 41,453; US: 184,000	KMCA: Million; KMCA: Platinum (Poca)
Golden Hour: Part.3	Released: June 13, 2025; Label: KQ Entertainment, RCA, Legacy; Formats: CD, digital download, streaming	1	—	62	—	—	— (Note: Golden Hour: Part.3 did not enter the Oricon Albums Chart, but it peaked at number 5 on the component Oricon Digital Albums Chart.)	— (Note: Golden Hour: Part.3 did not enter the UK Albums Chart, but it peaked at number 5 on the component UK Album Downloads Chart.)	2	—N/a	1	KOR: 639,849	KMCA: 2× Platinum (Poca)
Golden Hour: Part.3 'In Your Fantasy Edition'	Released: July 11, 2025; Label: KQ Entertainment, RCA, Legacy; Formats: CD, digital download, streaming	5	—	—	—	—	— (Note: Golden Hour: Part.3 'In Your Fantasy Edition' did not enter the Oricon Albums Chart, but it peaked at number 13 on the component Oricon Digital Albums Chart.)	— (Note: Golden Hour: Part.3 'In Your Fantasy Edition' did not enter the UK Albums Chart, but it peaked at number 22 on the component UK Album Downloads Chart.)	—	—N/a	—	KOR: 149,998	
Golden Hour: Part.4	Released: February 6, 2026; Label: KQ Entertainment, RCA, Legacy; Formats: CD, digital download, streaming	1	—	20	—	—	2	— (Note: Golden Hour: Part.4 did not enter the UK Albums Chart, but it peaked at number 11 on the component UK Album Downloads Chart.)	3	—N/a	1	KOR: 1,416,411; JPN: 70,742 (Phy.); US: 195,000	KMCA: 3× Platinum; KMCA: Platinum (Poca)
Golden Hour: Part.5	Released; June 26, 2026; Label: KQ Entertainment, RCA, Legacy; Formats: CD, LP, digital download, streaming	1	—	8	—	—	4	— (Note: Golden Hour: Part.4 did not enter the UK Albums Chart, but it peaked at number 9 on the component UK Album Downloads Chart.)	1	—N/a	1	KOR: 1,414,189; JPN: 38,712; US: 223,000	
Golden Hour: Part.6	Released: November 13, 2026; Label: KQ Entertainment, RCA, Legacy; Formats: CD, digital download, streaming	1	—	13	—	—	—	—	—	—N/a	—	KOR: 1,383,223	
"—" denotes releases that did not chart or were not released in that region.

=== Japanese extended plays ===
List of Japanese extended plays, with selected chart positions and sales
Title	Details	Peak chart positions	Sales
Title	Details	JPN	Sales
Treasure EP.Map to Answer	Released: February 12, 2020; Label: Nippon Columbia; Formats: CD, CD+DVD, digital download, streaming; Track listing: 1. "Declaration"; 2. "Answer" (Japanese version); 3. "Better"; 4. "Wonderland" (Sean Oh's Skrt mix); 5. "Sunrise" (Atmospheric mix by Spacecowboy); 6. "Star 1117" (Buddy's Melodic mix)	3	JPN: 18,988 (Phy.)
Beyond: Zero	Released: May 25, 2022; Label: Nippon Columbia; Formats: CD, CD+DVD, digital download, streaming; Track listing: 1. "Intro [Beyond: Zero]"; 2. "Deja Vu" (Japanese version); 3. "Rocky" (Boxers version); 4. "The King"; 5. "Turbulence" (夜間飛行 야간비행) (Japanese version); 6. "Take Me Home" (Japanese version); 7. "Fireworks (I'm the One)" (Japanese version)	2	JPN: 50,647 (Phy.)
The World EP. Paradigm	Released: November 30, 2022; Label: Nippon Columbia; Formats: CD, CD+DVD, digital download, streaming; Track listing: 1. "Intro: Siren"; 2. "Paradigm"; 3. "Cyberpunk" (Japanese version); 4. "Guerrilla" (Flag version); 5. "New World" (Japanese version); 6. "Outro: Liberty"	1	JPN: 63,778 (Phy.)

== Single albums ==
List of single albums, with selected chart positions and sales
Title	Details	Peak chart positions					Sales	Certifications
Title	Details	KOR	BEL (FL)	JPN	US	US World	Sales	Certifications
Season Songs (with Kim Jong-kook)	Released: August 16, 2021; Label: KQ Entertainment, Turbo JK Company; Formats: USB, digital download, streaming; Track listing: 1. "Be My Lover" (바다 보러 갈래?); 2. "White Love" (여름날의 겨울동화); 3. "The Black Cat Nero" (검은 고양이 네로)	—	—	—	—	—	—N/a	
Spin Off: From the Witness	Released: December 30, 2022; Label: KQ Entertainment, RCA, Legacy; Formats: CD, digital download, streaming	1	23	23	7	1	KOR: 494,649	KMCA: Platinum
"—" denotes releases that did not chart or were not released in that region.

== Singles ==
=== As lead artist ===
List of singles, with selected chart positions, showing year released, sales and album name
Title	Year	Peak chart positions									Sales	Album
Title	Year	KOR	HUN	JPN	JPN Hot	NZ Hot	UK Sales	US	US World	WW	Sales	Album
"Pirate King" (해적왕)	2018	—	—	—	—	—	—	—	—	—	—N/a	Treasure EP.1: All to Zero
"Treasure"	2018	—	—	—	—	—	—	—	—	—	—N/a	Treasure EP.1: All to Zero
"Say My Name"	2019	—	—	—	—	—	—	—	8	—	—N/a	Treasure EP.2: Zero to One
"Illusion"	2019	—	—	—	—	—	—	—	23	—	—N/a	Treasure EP.3: One to All
"Wave"	2019	—	—	—	—	—	—	—	17	—	—N/a	Treasure EP.3: One to All
"Wonderland"	2019	—	—	—	—	—	—	—	6	—	US: 1,000	Treasure EP.Fin: All to Action
"Utopia" (Japanese version)	2019	—	—	—	—	—	—	—	—	—	—N/a	Treasure EP.Extra: Shift the Map
"Answer"	2020	—	—	—	—	—	—	—	6	—	US: 1,000	Treasure Epilogue: Action to Answer and Treasure EP.Map to Answer
"Inception"	2020	—	—	—	—	—	—	—	9	—	—N/a	Zero: Fever Part.1
"Thanxx"	2020	—	—	—	—	—	—	—	18	—	—N/a	Zero: Fever Part.1
"Call Me Anytime" (with Eden, Maddox, and Eden-Ary)	2020	—	—	—	—	—	—	—	—	—	—N/a	Non-album single
"Fireworks (I'm the One)" (불놀이야)	2021	148	32	—	—	—	—	—	6	—	—N/a	Zero: Fever Part.2
"Still Here"	2021	—	—	—	—	—	—	—	24	—	—N/a	Into the A to Z
"Dreamers"	2021	—	—	2	24	—	—	—	16	—	JPN: 38,414 (phy.)	Non-album single
"Be My Lover" (바다 보러 갈래?) (with Kim Jong-kook)	2021	— (Note: "Be My Lover" did not enter the Gaon Digital Chart, but peaked at number 35 on the Gaon Download Chart.)	—	—	—	—	—	—	17	—	—N/a	Season Songs
"Deja Vu"	2021	49	30	—	—	—	—	—	4	—	—N/a	Zero: Fever Part.3
"Eternal Sunshine"	2021	— (Note: "Eternal Sunshine" did not enter the Gaon Digital Chart, but peaked at number 116 on the Gaon Download Chart.)	—	—	—	—	—	—	—	—	—N/a	Zero: Fever Part.3
"Turbulence" (야간비행)	2021	— (Note: "Turbulence" did not enter the Gaon Digital Chart, but peaked at number 134 on the Gaon Download Chart.)	—	—	—	—	—	—	9	—	—N/a	Zero: Fever Epilogue
"The Real" (Heung version) (멋 (흥:興 Ver.))	2021	149	—	—	—	—	—	—	6 (Note: Song data of 'Heung version' was combined with the original version by Billboard. "The Real" re-entered at number 6 on the weekly chart dated December 25, 2021.)	—	—N/a	Zero: Fever Epilogue
"Rocky" (Boxers version)	2022	—	—	—	—	—	—	—	—	—	—N/a	Beyond: Zero
"Guerrilla"	2022	67	8	—	—	39	—	—	5	—	—N/a	The World EP.1: Movement
"Halazia"	2022	155	38	—	—	7	85	—	2	—	—N/a	Spin Off: From the Witness
"Limitless"	2023	—	—	2	6	—	—	—	—	—	JPN: 72,717 (phy.)	Non-album single
"Bouncy (K-Hot Chilli Peppers)"	2023	33	34	—	—	8	68	—	4	—	—N/a	The World EP.2: Outlaw
"Crazy Form" (미친 폼)	2023	33	—	—	—	17	73	—	3	—	—N/a	The World EP.Fin: Will
"Not Okay"	2024	—	—	2	4	—	—	—	—	—	JPN: 216,682 (phy.)	Non-album single
"Work"	2024	57	—	—	—	24	65	—	1	—	—N/a	Golden Hour: Part.1
"Hush-Hush" (with Be:First)	2024	—	—	—	1	—	—	—	9	—	—N/a	2:Be
"Royal" (with Be:First)	2024	—	—	—	22	—	—	—	—	—	—N/a	Non-album singles
"Birthday"	2024	—	—	3	4	—	—	—	—	—	JPN: 122,947 (phy.)	Non-album singles
"Ice on My Teeth"	2024	97	—	—	—	25	12	—	3	—	—N/a	Golden Hour: Part.2
"Lemon Drop"	2025	— (Note: "Lemon Drop" did not enter the Circle Digital Chart, but it peaked at number seven on the component Circle Download Chart.)	—	—	—	22	66	69	1	—	—N/a	Golden Hour: Part.3
"In Your Fantasy"	2025	— (Note: "In Your Fantasy" did not enter the Circle Digital Chart, but it peaked at number 82 on the component Circle Download Chart.)	—	—	—	—	12	68	1	—	—N/a	Golden Hour: Part.3 'In Your Fantasy Edition'
"Ash"	2025	—	—	—	—	—	—	—	—	—	—N/a	Ashes to Light
"From (2018)"	2025	—	—	—	—	—	—	—	9	—	—N/a	Non-album single
"Choose"	2025	—	—	—	—	—	—	—	4	—	—N/a	Golden Hour: Part.4
"Adrenaline"	2026	7	—	—	—	16	40	— (Note: "Adrenaline" did not enter the Billboard Hot 100, but peaked at number 19 on the Bubbling Under Hot 100 chart.)	1	—	—N/a	Golden Hour: Part.4
"Bad"	2026	6	—	2	3	13	—	—	—	142	JPN: 165,744 (phy.)	Golden Hour: Part.5
"Drip"	2026	97	—	—	—	4	51	—	—	190	—N/a	Golden Hour: Part.6
"Up"	2026	—	—	—	—	23	—	—	—	—	—N/a	Golden Hour: Part.6
"—" denotes releases that did not chart or were not released in that region. "*" denotes chart did not exist at that time.

=== Promotional singles ===
List of promotional singles, with selected chart positions, showing year released and album name
Title	Year	Peak chart positions		Album
Title	Year	KOR DL	US World	Album
"Summer Taste" (with Rain, Monsta X, and Brave Girls) (Note: Ateez are credited as one of the artists, but "Summer Taste" features only Hongjoong and Yunho.)	2021	54	—	Non-album singles
"Don't Stop" (Note: "Don't Stop" was released as a promotional single in collaboration with Universe.)	2022	95	6	Non-album singles
"—" denotes releases that did not chart or were not released in that region.

== Other charted songs ==
Title	Year	Peak chart positions				Album
Title	Year	KOR DL	HUN	NZ Hot	US World	Album
"Hala Hala (Hearts Awakened, Live Alive)"	2019	—	—	—	15	Treasure EP.2: Zero to One
"Dancing like Butterfly Wings"	2019	—	21	—	—	Treasure EP.3: One to All
"Horizon" (지평선)	2020	—	—	—	18	Treasure Epilogue: Action to Answer
"Take Me Home"	2021	—	—	—	16	Zero: Fever Part.2
"The Real" (멋)	2021	14	40	—	6	Kingdom Final: Who Is the King?
"The Black Cat Nero" (검은 고양이 네로)	2021	—	—	—	21	Season Songs
"White Love" (여름날의 겨울동화)	2021	—	—	—	25	Season Songs
"We Know"	2023	—	—	—	10	The World EP.Fin: Will
"Silver Light"	2023	—	—	—	8	The World EP.Fin: Will
"It's You" (by Yeosang, San and Wooyoung)	2023	—	—	—	7	The World EP.Fin: Will
"Masterpiece"	2025	—	—	—	9	Golden Hour: Part.3
"Castle"	2025	—	—	—	8	Golden Hour: Part.3
"Skin" (Seonghwa solo)	2025	—	—	—	7	Golden Hour: Part.3 'In Your Fantasy Edition'
"Slide to Me" (Yunho solo)	2025	—	—	—	8	Golden Hour: Part.3 'In Your Fantasy Edition'
"Legacy" (Yeosang solo)	2025	—	—	—	9	Golden Hour: Part.3 'In Your Fantasy Edition'
"Roar" (Mingi solo)	2025	—	—	—	10	Golden Hour: Part.3 'In Your Fantasy Edition'
"Sagittarius" (Wooyoung solo)	2025	—	—	—	6	Golden Hour: Part.3 'In Your Fantasy Edition'
"Ghost"	2026	—	—	—	10	Golden Hour: Part.4
"NASA"	2026	—	—	34	7	Golden Hour: Part.4
"Mamacita"	2026	—	—	38	—	Golden Hour: Part.5
"Anemia"	2026	—	—	36	—	Golden Hour: Part.6
"Hollow Victory"	2026	—	—	40	—	Golden Hour: Part.6
"—" denotes releases that did not chart or were not released in that region.

== Soundtrack appearances ==
Title	Year	Album
"Let's Get Together"	2022	Mimicus OST
"Like That"	2022	Lookism OST
"Me Crazy"	2025	Sealook S2 OST
"Your Journey"	2025	Sealook S2 OST

== Videography ==
=== Music videos ===
Year	Music video	Director(s)	Choreographer(s)	Note	Ref.
2018	"From"	—N/a	Ateez	Pre-debut as KQ Fellaz	—N/a
2018	"Pirate King" (해적왕)	Lee Gi-baek (Tiger Cave)	홍재민 (BBtrippin), Rie Hata, Ateez	Performance Video	
2018	"Treasure"	Lee Gi-baek (Tiger Cave)	홍재민 (BBtrippin), Anze Skrube	Debut Music Video	
2019	"Hala Hala (Hearts Awakened, Live Alive)"	Jason Kim (Flipevil)	홍재민 (BBtrippin)	Performance Video	
2019	"Say My Name"	Jason Kim (Flipevil)	홍재민 (BBtrippin), Anze Skrube, Josh Smith, Johnny Erasme	—N/a	
2019	"Promise"	—N/a	—N/a	Special Music Video by M2	
2019	"Illusion"	Jason Kim (Flipevil)	홍재민 (BBtrippin), Anze Skrube, Johnny Blaze		
2019	"Wave"	Jason Kim (Flipevil)	홍재민 (BBtrippin), Anze Skrube, Johnny Blaze		
2019	"Aurora"	—N/a	홍재민 (BBtrippin)	—N/a	
2019	"Aurora (NY Edition)"	Studio Choom	홍재민 (BBtrippin)	Special New York Edition by M2	—N/a
2019	"Wonderland"	Jason Kim (Flipevil)	홍재민 (BBtrippin), Anze Skrube, Johhny Blaze, Josh Smith	—N/a	
2019	"Utopia"	Junwoo Lee (Salt Film)	홍재민 (BBtrippin)	Debut Japanese Music Video	
2020	"Answer"	Jason Kim (Flipevil)	홍재민 (BBtrippin), Anze Skrube	—N/a	
2020	"Answer (Japanese Version)"	Jason Kim (Flipevil)	홍재민 (BBtrippin), Anze Skrube	Japanese MV	
2020	"Inception"	Seong Wonmo (Digipedi)	홍재민 (BBtrippin)	—N/a	
2020	"Thanxx"	Lee Gi-baek (Tiger Cave)	홍재민 (BBtrippin), Melvin Timtim	—N/a	
2020	"The Black Cat Nero"	Chung Ki Youl (Digipedi)	홍재민 (BBtrippin)	Halloween Performance Video	
2021	"Fireworks (I'm the One)" (불놀이야)	Jason Kim (Flipevil)	BBtrippin, Anze Skrube, Josh Smith	—N/a	
2021	"Dreamers"	Zanybros	—N/a	1st Japan Single	—N/a
2021	"Be My Lover" (바다 보러 갈래?) with (Kim Jong-kook)	Lee Gi-baek (Tiger Cave)	BBtrippin	Collaboration Single	—N/a
2021	"Deja Vu"	Yeom Woojin	BBtrippin, Melvin Timtim	—N/a	
2021	"Eternal Sunshine"	Lee Gi-baek (Tiger Cave)	BBtrippin, Keone Madrid	—N/a	
2021	"Turbulence" (야간비행)	Seong Wonmo, Chung Ki Youl (Digipedi)	BBtrippin, Lyle Beniga	—N/a	
2021	"The Real (흥 : 興 : Heung ver.)" (멋)	Seong Wonmo, Chung Ki Youl (Digipedi)	BBtrippin, Rie Hata	—N/a	
2022	"Don't Stop"	Shin Hee-won (STWT)	—N/a	Universe Music	
2022	"Rocky (Boxers Ver.)"	OJun Kwon (ARFILM)	BBtrippin	2nd Japan EP	
2022	"Guerrilla"	Seong Wonmo, Moon Seokho (Digipedi)	BBtrippin, Sienna Lalau	—N/a	
2022	"Paradigm"	Lee Minju, Lee Hayoung (MOSWANTD)	BBtrippin	3rd Japan EP; Performance ver.	
2022	"Halazia"	Seong Wonmo, Moon Seokho (Digipedi)	BBtrippin	—N/a	
2023	"Limitless"	JIMMY (VIA)	—N/a	2nd Japan Single	
2023	"Bouncy (K-Hot Chilli Peppers)"	Seong Wonmo (Digipedi)	BBtrippin, Reina, 82 Aitty Too	—N/a	
2023	"Crazy Form" (미친 폼)	Yang Soonsik (YSS Studio)	BBtrippin, Reina, 82 Aitty Too	—N/a	
2024	"Matz"	ILLUMIN	—N/a	Sung by Hongjoong, Seonghwa	
2024	"It's You"	Kwon Yongsoo (STUDIO SACCHARIN)	—N/a	Sung by Yeosang, San, Wooyoung	
2024	"Youth"	NDVISUAL	—N/a	Sung by Yunho, Mingi	
2024	"Everything"	96wave	—N/a	Sung by Jongho	
2024	"Not Okay"	Lafic (LIMINAL & TMTBS)	—N/a	3rd Japan Single	
2024	"Work"	Seong Wonmo (Digipedi)	J Blaze, BBtrippin, San	—N/a	
2024	"Birthday"	Lafic (LIMINAL & TMTBS)	BBtrippin	4th Japan Single	
2024	"Ice On My Teeth"	Jeon Jihoon (SL8)	BBtrippin	—N/a	
2025	"Lemon Drop"	Lafic (LIMINAL & TMTBS)	BBtrippin, TEAM I AM	—N/a	
2025	"In Your Fantasy"	Jeon Jihoon (SL8)	BBtrippin, TEAM I AM	—N/a	
2025	"Ash"	Yong-soo Kwon (Studio Saccharin)	BBtrippin	2nd Japanese album	
2025	"To be your light"	Seo Jae-eun	—N/a	Sung by Jongho	
2025	"Sagittarius"	KQ Video Production	Dun (BBtrippin)	Sung by Wooyoung	
2025	"Roar"	Juli YL (Notforxale)	BBtrippin	Sung by Mingi	
2025	"Creep"			Sung by San	
2025	"Legacy"		BBtrippin	Sung by Yeosang	
2025	"Slide to me"		Kaname Takahashi	Sung by Yunho	
2025	"NO1"		BBtrippin	Sung by Hongjoong	
2026	"Skin"	Choonchic	Dun (BBtrippin)	Sung by Seonghwa	
2026	"Adrenaline"	Yongsoo Kim (HighQualityFish)	BBtrippin, San	—N/a	
2026	"Nasa"	Jaehwan Hong, Hyesu Lee (Swisher)	BBtrippin	Performance Video	
2026	"Bad"	Seong Wonmo (Digipedi)	BBtrippin, San, Leejung Lee	—N/a	
2026	"Bad (Japanese Ver.)"	Ximin Oh (Noisyroom)	BBtrippin, San, Leejung Lee	Japanese MV	
2026	"Drip"	Bang Jae-yeob (BANGJAEYEOB FILM)	BBtrippin, Bada Lee	—N/a	
2026	"Up"	Phương Vũ (Antiantiart)	BBtrippin, San, Nick Joseph	—N/a	

=== Other videos ===
Year	Title	Director(s)	Ref.
2020	"Zero : Fever Part.1 'Diary Film'"	Seong Wonmo (Digipedi)	
2022	"The World 'Movement' Official Trailer 1"	Seong Wonmo (Digipedi)	
2022	"The World 'Movement' Official Trailer 2"	Seong Wonmo (Digipedi)	
2022	"Spin Off : From The Witness Prologue"	Seong Wonmo (Digipedi)	—N/a
2023	"'Bouncy (K-Hot Chilli Peppers)' Official MV Opening Sequence"	Seong Wonmo (Digipedi)	—N/a
