= List of awards and nominations received by Ateez =

Ateez awards and nominations
Awards and nominations
Award	Wins	Nominations

Totals (Note: Certain award groups do not simply award one winner. They acknowledge several different recipients, have runners-up, and have third place. Since this is a specific recognition and is different from losing an award, runner-up mentions are considered wins in this award tally. For simplification and to avoid errors, each award in this list has been presumed to have had a prior nomination.)
- Wins: 59
- Nominations: 147

Ateez is a South Korean boy band formed by KQ Entertainment, consists of eight members: Hongjoong, Seonghwa, Yunho, Yeosang, San, Mingi, Wooyoung and Jongho. Their debut extended play (EP) Treasure EP.1: All to Zero was released on October 24, 2018.

== Awards and nominations ==
Name of the award ceremony, year presented, award category, nominee(s) of the award and the result of the nomination
Award ceremony	Year	Category	Nominee(s) / Work(s)	Result	Ref.
American Music Awards	2025	Favorite K-POP Artist	Ateez	Nominated	
American Music Awards	2026	Best Male K-Pop Artist	Ateez	Nominated	
APAN Music Awards	2020	Best Male Group (Global)	Ateez	Nominated	
APAN Music Awards	2020	APAN Top 10 (Bonsang)	Ateez	Nominated	
Asia Artist Awards	2020	Popularity Award – Male Singer	Ateez	Nominated	
Asia Artist Awards	2021	AAA RET Popularity Award – Male Group	Ateez	Nominated	
Asia Artist Awards	2021	U+Idol Live Popularity Award – Male Group	Ateez	Nominated	
Asia Artist Awards	2025	Best Artist (Singer)	Ateez	Won	
Asia Artist Awards	2025	Best K-pop Record	Ateez	Won	
Asia Artist Awards	2025	Stage of the Year (Daesang)	Ateez	Won	
Asia Artist Awards	2026	Popularity Award – Group (Male)	Ateez	Pending	
Asia Model Awards	2020	Popular Star Award – Male (Singer)	Ateez	Won	
Asia Star Entertainer Awards	2026	The Best Conceptual Artist	Ateez	Won	
Asia Star Entertainer Awards	2026	The Platinum (Bonsang)	Ateez	Won	
Asia Star Entertainer Awards	2026	Record of the Year (Daesang)	Ateez	Won	
Blue Dragon Series Awards	2022	Best Male Entertainer	Ateez	Longlisted	
Blue Dragon Series Awards	2022	Best New Male Entertainer	Ateez	Longlisted	
Edaily Culture Awards	2023	Best Concert Award	The Fellowship: Break the Wall	Won	
Edaily Culture Awards	2023	Daesang (Grand Prize)	Ateez	Nominated	
Forbes Korea Awards	2022	The Best Fandom	Ateez	Won	
Gaon Chart Music Awards	2021	Album of the Year – 1st Quarter	Treasure Epilogue: Action to Answer	Nominated	
Gaon Chart Music Awards	2021	Album of the Year – 3rd Quarter	Zero: Fever Part.1	Nominated	
Gaon Chart Music Awards	2021	Mubeat Global Choice Award – Male	Ateez	Nominated	
Gaon Chart Music Awards	2021	World Rookie of the Year	Ateez	Won	
Gaon Chart Music Awards	2022	Mubeat Global Choice Award – Male	Ateez	Nominated	
Genie Music Awards	2019	The Male New Artist	Ateez	Nominated	
Golden Disc Awards	2019	Disc Bonsang	Treasure EP.Fin: All to Action	Nominated	
Golden Disc Awards	2019	Most Popular Artist	Ateez	Nominated	
Golden Disc Awards	2019	Next Generation Award	Ateez	Won	
Golden Disc Awards	2019	Rookie of the Year	Ateez	Nominated	
Golden Disc Awards	2020	Disc Bonsang	Zero: Fever Part.1	Nominated	
Golden Disc Awards	2020	Curaprox Popularity Award	Ateez	Nominated	
Golden Disc Awards	2020	QQ Music Popularity Award	Ateez	Nominated	
Golden Disc Awards	2021	Album Bonsang	Zero: Fever Part.3	Nominated	
Golden Disc Awards	2021	Most Popular Artist Award	Ateez	Nominated	
Golden Disc Awards	2022	Album Bonsang	The World Ep.1: Movement	Nominated	
Golden Disc Awards	2022	TikTok Most Popular Artist Award	Ateez	Nominated	
Golden Disc Awards	2023	Album Bonsang	The World Ep.2: Outlaw	Nominated	
Golden Disc Awards	2023	Popular Artist Award	Ateez	Nominated	
Golden Disc Awards	2024	Album Bonsang	The World EP.Fin: Will	Won	
Golden Disc Awards	2024	Album Daesang	The World EP.Fin: Will	Nominated	
Golden Disc Awards	2024	Most Popular Artist – Male	Ateez	Nominated	
Golden Disc Awards	2025	Best Album (Bonsang)	Golden Hour: Part.2	Won	
Hanteo Music Awards	2021	Artist Award – Male Group	Ateez	Nominated	
Hanteo Music Awards	2021	Initial Chodong Record Award	Ateez	Won	
Hanteo Music Awards	2023	Artist of the Year (Bonsang)	Ateez	Won	
Hanteo Music Awards	2023	Top Global Performer	Ateez	Won	
Hanteo Music Awards	2023	Global Artist – South America	Ateez	Nominated	
Hanteo Music Awards	2023	WhosFandom Award	Ateez	Nominated	
Hanteo Music Awards	2024	Artist of the Year (Bonsang)	Ateez	Nominated	
Hanteo Music Awards	2024	Global Artist – Africa	Ateez	Won	
Hanteo Music Awards	2024	Global Artist – Asia	Ateez	Nominated	
Hanteo Music Awards	2024	Global Artist – Europe	Ateez	Nominated	
Hanteo Music Awards	2024	Global Artist – North America	Ateez	Nominated	
Hanteo Music Awards	2024	Global Artist – Oceania	Ateez	Nominated	
Hanteo Music Awards	2024	Global Artist – South America	Ateez	Nominated	
Hanteo Music Awards	2024	WhosFandom Award – Male	Ateez	Nominated	
Hanteo Music Awards	2025	Best Artist (Daesang)	Ateez	Won	
Hanteo Music Awards	2025	Artist of the Year (Bonsang)	Ateez	Won	
Hanteo Music Awards	2025	World Stage	Ateez	Won	
iHeartRadio Music Awards	2024	K-pop Song of the Year	"Bouncy (K-Hot Chilli Peppers)"	Nominated	
iHeartRadio Music Awards	2024	Best Fan Army	Atiny	Nominated	
iHeartRadio Music Awards	2025	K-pop Artist of the Year	Ateez	Won	
iHeartRadio Music Awards	2025	Favorite K-pop Dance Challenge	"Work"	Nominated	
KBS Entertainment Awards	2025	Digital Content Award (Note: Shared with the whole cast.)	Idol 1N2D	Won	
K-World Dream Awards	2023	K-Global Best World Tour Award	Ateez	Won	
K-World Dream Awards	2023	K-Global Bonsang (Main Prize)	Ateez	Won	
K-World Dream Awards	2026	Best Stage Award	Ateez	Won	
K-World Dream Awards	2026	K-World Dream Artist Award	Ateez	Won	
K-World Dream Awards	2026	K-World Dream Group Popularity Award – Male	Ateez	Won	
K-World Dream Awards	2026	K-World Dream Best Artist Award – Male (Daesang)	Ateez	Won	
Korea Arts and Culture Awards	2025	Korean Wave Idol	Ateez	Won	
Korea Grand Music Awards	2024	Best Song	"Crazy Form"	Won	
Korea Grand Music Awards	2024	Grand Honor's Choice (Daesang)	Ateez	Won	
Korea Grand Music Awards	2024	Best Artist	Ateez	Nominated	
Korea Grand Music Awards	2024	Trend of the Year – K-pop Group	Ateez	Nominated	
Korea Grand Music Awards	2025	Best Artist 10	Ateez	Won	
Korea Grand Music Awards	2025	Grand Artist (Daesang)	Ateez	Won	
Korea Grand Music Awards	2026	Best Stage – Male	Ateez	Won	
Korea Grand Music Awards	2026	Best Music (Bonsang)	Ateez	Won	
Korea Grand Music Awards	2026	Grand Record (Daesang)	Ateez	Won	
MAMA Awards	2019	Artist of the Year	Ateez	Nominated	
MAMA Awards	2019	Best New Male Artist	Ateez	Nominated	
MAMA Awards	2019	Worldwide Icon of the Year	Ateez	Nominated	
MAMA Awards	2019	Worldwide Fans' Choice Top 10	Ateez	Won	
MAMA Awards	2020	Worldwide Icon of the Year	Ateez	Nominated	
MAMA Awards	2020	Worldwide Fans' Choice Top 10	Ateez	Won	
MAMA Awards	2020	Discovery of the Year	Ateez	Won	
MAMA Awards	2020	Best Dance Performance – Male Group	"Inception"	Nominated	
MAMA Awards	2020	Song of the Year	"Inception"	Nominated	
MAMA Awards	2021	Worldwide Fans' Choice Top 10	Ateez	Nominated	
MAMA Awards	2022	Worldwide Fans' Choice Top 10	Ateez	Nominated	
MAMA Awards	2023	Worldwide Fans' Choice Top 10	Ateez	Won	
MAMA Awards	2023	Worldwide Icon of the Year	Ateez	Nominated	
MAMA Awards	2023	Favorite Global Performer – Male Group	Ateez	Won	
MAMA Awards	2024	Album of the Year	The World EP.Fin: Will	Nominated	
MAMA Awards	2024	Worldwide Fans' Choice Top 10	Ateez	Nominated	
MAMA Awards	2026	Best Choreography	"Bad"	Won	
MAMA Awards	2026	Best Dance Performance – Male Group	"Bad"	Nominated	
Melon Music Awards	2024	Global Artist – Male	Ateez	Won	
Melon Music Awards	2026	Best Performance – Male	Ateez	Won	
Melon Music Awards	2026	Hot Trend	Ateez	Won	
MTV Europe Music Awards	2019	Best Korean Act	Ateez	Won	
Mubeat Awards	2019	Best Song	"Wonderland"	Won	
Mubeat Awards	2019	Best Ending Fairy	"Wonderland"	Nominated	
Mubeat Awards	2019	Best Male Rookie Artist	Ateez	Nominated	
Mubeat Awards	2019	Best Performance Group	Ateez	Nominated	
Mubeat Awards	2020	Artist of the Year	Ateez	Nominated	
Mubeat Awards	2020	Song of the Year	"Inception"	Nominated	
Mubeat Awards	2020	Best Performance Group	"Inception"	Nominated	
Mubeat Awards	2021	Artist of the Year	Ateez	Nominated	
Mubeat Awards	2021	Song of the Year	"Deja Vu"	Nominated	
Mubeat Awards	2021	MV of the Year	"Deja Vu"	Nominated	
Mubeat Awards	2021	Best Performance	"Deja Vu"	Nominated	
Seoul Music Awards	2020	K-Wave Award	Ateez	Nominated	
Seoul Music Awards	2020	Popularity Award	Ateez	Nominated	
Seoul Music Awards	2020	Rookie of the Year	Ateez	Nominated	
Seoul Music Awards	2021	Main Award (Bonsang)	Ateez	Won	
Seoul Music Awards	2021	K-Wave Popularity Award	Ateez	Nominated	
Seoul Music Awards	2021	Popularity Award	Ateez	Nominated	
Seoul Music Awards	2021	WhosFandom Award	Ateez	Nominated	
Seoul Music Awards	2022	Main Award (Bonsang)	Ateez	Won	
Seoul Music Awards	2022	K-wave Popularity Award	Ateez	Nominated	
Seoul Music Awards	2022	Popularity Award	Ateez	Nominated	
Seoul Music Awards	2022	U+Idol Live Best Artist Award	Ateez	Nominated	
Seoul Music Awards	2023	Main Award (Bonsang)	Ateez	Nominated	
Seoul Music Awards	2023	Hallyu Special Award	Ateez	Nominated	
Seoul Music Awards	2023	Popularity Award	Ateez	Nominated	
Seoul Music Awards	2024	Main Award (Bonsang)	Ateez	Nominated	
Seoul Music Awards	2024	Hallyu Special Award	Ateez	Nominated	
Seoul Music Awards	2024	Popularity Award	Ateez	Nominated	
Seoul Music Awards	2025	Main Award (Bonsang)	Ateez	Nominated	
Seoul Music Awards	2025	Popularity Award	Ateez	Nominated	
Seoul Music Awards	2025	K-Wave Special Award	Ateez	Nominated	
Seoul Music Awards	2025	K-pop World Choice – Group	Ateez	Nominated	
Seoul Music Awards	2026	Main Award (Bonsang)	Ateez	Won	
Seoul Music Awards	2026	Grand Prize (Daesang)	Ateez	Won	
Soribada Best K-Music Awards	2019	Performance Award	Ateez	Won	
Soribada Best K-Music Awards	2019	Popularity Award – Male	Ateez	Nominated	
Soribada Best K-Music Awards	2020	Popularity Award – Male	Ateez	Nominated	
Soribada Best K-Music Awards	2020	Global Artist Award	Ateez	Nominated	
The Fact Music Awards	2020	Global Hottest Artist	Ateez	Won	
The Fact Music Awards	2020	Popularity Award	Ateez	Nominated	
The Fact Music Awards	2020	Fan N Star Choice Award － Singer	Ateez	Nominated	
The Fact Music Awards	2021	Artist of the Year (Bonsang)	Ateez	Won	
The Fact Music Awards	2021	Popularity Award	Ateez	Nominated	
The Fact Music Awards	2021	Fan N Star Choice Award － Singer	Ateez	Nominated	
The Fact Music Awards	2022	Artist of the Year (Bonsang)	Ateez	Won	
The Fact Music Awards	2022	Best Performer	Ateez	Won	
The Fact Music Awards	2023	Artist of the Year (Bonsang)	Ateez	Won	
The Fact Music Awards	2026	Artist of the Year (Bonsang)	Ateez	Won	
The Fact Music Awards	2026	Icon of the Year (Daesang)	Ateez	Won	

== State and cultural honors ==
Name of the organization, year presented, and the award given
Country	Ceremony	Year	Award	Ref.
South Korea	Korean Popular Culture and Arts Awards (Note: Honors are given at the Korean Popular Culture and Arts Awards, arranged by the Korea Creative Content Agency and hosted by the Ministry of Culture, Sports and Tourism. They are awarded to those who have contributed to the arts and South Korea's pop culture.)	2025	Prime Minister's Commendation	
South Korea	Newsis K-Expo Cultural Awards (Note: Co-sponsored by Korea's Ministry of Culture, Sports and Tourism, Ministry of Trade, Industry, and Energy, Korea Communications Commission, and Korea Creative Content Agency, it awards cultural icons and businesses that promote the sustainability of the Korean Wave and boost the industry's competitiveness.)	2025	Seoul Mayor Award	

== Listicles ==
Name of publisher, year listed, name of listicle, and placement
Publisher	Year	Listicle	Placement	Ref.
Grammy	2021	5 Rising Korean Artists To Know Now	Placed	
