= Treasure Epilogue: Action to Answer =

- Digital cover

EP by Ateez
- Released: January 6, 2020
- Recorded: 2019
- Genre: K-pop; hip hop; EDM
- Length: 15:29
- Language: Korean
- Label: KQ Entertainment

Ateez chronology
Treasure EP.Extra: Shift the Map (2019)	Treasure Epilogue: Action to Answer (2020)	Treasure EP.Map to Answer (2020)

Singles from Treasure Epilogue: Action to Answer
- 1. "Answer" Released: January 6, 2020

Treasure Epilogue: Action to Answer is the fourth extended play (EP) by South Korean boy band Ateez. It was released on January 6, 2020, with "Answer" serving as the lead single. The physical album comes in two versions: A and Z. Musically, it is a hip hop and EDM album.

Commercially, the album debuted atop the Gaon Album Chart, becoming Ateez's second number-one album in South Korea. Ateez promoted the album with a series of live performances on the Golden Disc Awards and various South Korean music shows. The band also announced The Fellowship: Map The Treasure World Tour in support of the album series.

== Release and promotion ==
On December 24, 2019, Ateez teased their comeback in 2020, through a poster teaser containing the words: "Look around you. Did you find your TREASURE? Through the phrase, Can you see the changes?" On December 26, KQ Entertainment announced the release of Ateez's fourth extended play Treasure Epilogue: Action to Answer along with the release date. It serves as a follow-up to their successful "Treasure" album series which began with their debut in 2018. A comeback schedule was released the same day containing dates for the sequential release of teasers for the album. The full album tracklist was released on December 27. The album consists of five tracks including the lead single, "Answer". The same day, a group photo teaser for the album was released. From December 28 to December 31, solo teaser photos for the band members were released, in sets of two. On January 2, the group released a performance poster teaser. On January 3, a performance preview video of the lead single, "Answer" was released. The album was released on January 6 in CD and digital formats. An accompanying music video for the lead single, "Answer" was released in conjunction with the release of the album. The video references to the group's past releases "Say My Name", "Wave", "Illusion", "Hala Hala" and "Pirate King" and depicts the band looking back on their journey, along with a brand new spoiler for an upcoming song, which was revealed three years later as "Sector 1" from their 2022 EP The World EP.1: Movement. The group maintained their "dynamic performance style" while showcasing "powerful choreography".

On January 4, Ateez performed "Answer" for the first time at the 34th Golden Disc Awards. The group promoted the album through a series of live performances on various music shows, starting with Mnet's M! Countdown on January 9. They also performed the songs from their album on KBS's Music Bank, MBC's Show! Music Core, and SBS's Inkigayo. Ateez further announced The Fellowship: Map The Treasure World Tour in support of the album series.

== Composition ==
The album's lead single, "Answer" is a hip hop, trap and EDM song in style of dark Latin pop. The song features "high-notes", "soaring hooks", vocal harmonies, "melodic verses" and heavy raps. It derives from piano and panpiped instrumentation which invokes a blend of Celtic folk and Eurobeat musical styles. The end of the "Answer" music video features the intro of their 2022 song "Sector 1". "Star 1117" is an R&B ballad song with slow piano notes, falsetto inflections and smooth melodies. Featuring an "easy-to-sing-along-to" chorus, the song is dedicated to the group's fans. "Horizon" is a "bombastic" hip hop and EDM song. It was composed and written by HongJoong and was inspired by "Pirate King". "Precious" is a hip hop song that serves extension to the song "Precious (Overture)" from their first studio album Treasure EP.Fin: All to Action (2019). "Outro: Long Journey", spanning for 90-seconds, features string instrumentation which has been compared to Coldplay's "Sunrise" from the album Everyday Life (2019).

== Reception ==
Chris Gillett from South China Morning Post gave the album a positive review, writing: "Ateez sound at home with their synth-led hard hitters, but it’s when they break out of this formula, where they really strike gold." Hong Dam-young from The Korea Herald wrote, "The group has succeeded in carving out its own sonic niche, staying away from the more typical boy-next-door image and leaning toward a more aggressive and swaggering hip-hop style." Reviewing for IZM, Park Soo-jin wrote: "When looking at the title 'Answer' as the center, it is interesting to note that the creation of the members who gave different accents, even with the same lyrics (because they gave different directions), is interesting and distinctive."

The album debuted atop the Gaon Album Chart giving Ateez, their second consecutive number one album in South Korea. Additionally, it topped the Gaon Monthly Chart for the month of January, selling 128,273 copies. It also debuted at number five on the Billboard World Albums Chart.

== Track listing ==
Treasure Epilogue: Action to Answer track listing
No.	Title	Writer(s)	Producer(s)	Length
1.	"Answer"	Eden, Ollounder, Leez, Hongjoong, Mingi	Eden, Ollounder, Leez, Buddy	3:39
2.	"Horizon" (지평선; Jipyeongseon)	Eden, Leez, Hongjoong, Mingi	Eden, Hongjoong, Leez, Buddy	3:11
3.	"Star 1117"	Eden, Leez, Hongjoong, Mingi	Eden, Ollounder, Leez, Buddy	3:42
4.	"Precious"	Eden, Ollounder, Leez, Hongjoong, Mingi	Eden, Ollounder, Leez	3:23
5.	"Outro: Long Journey"	Eden, Ollounder, Leez, Buddy	Eden, Ollounder, Leez, Buddy, 어나일	1:34
Total length:				15:29

== Charts ==
Weekly charts
Chart (2020)	Peak position
Belgian Albums (Ultratop Flanders)	144
Belgian Albums (Ultratop Wallonia)	181
Japanese Albums (Oricon)	31
Hungarian Albums (MAHASZ)	19
Polish Albums (ZPAV)	17
South Korean Albums (Gaon)	1
US Heatseekers Albums (Billboard)	18
US World Albums (Billboard)	5

Year-end charts
Chart (2020)	Position
South Korean Albums (Gaon)	47

== Accolades ==
Awards and nominations
Year	Organization	Award	Work	Result	Ref.
2020	Gaon Chart Music Awards	Album of the Year – 1st Quarter	Treasure Epilogue: Action To Answer	Nominated	

Year-end lists
Critic/Publication	List	Work	Rank	Ref.
Dazed	The 40 Best K-pop Songs of 2020	"Answer"	8	
MTV	The Best K-pop B-sides of 2020	"Horizon"	12	
Paper	The 40 Best K-pop Songs of 2020	"Answer"	13	
Time	Best K-pop Songs of 2020	"Answer"	N/A	
South China Morning Post	The 15 best K-pop albums of 2020	Treasure Epilogue: Action To Answer	13	

== See also ==
- List of 2020 albums
- List of Gaon Album Chart number ones of 2020
- Ateez Merchandise
