= Preciosa =

Preciosa, a Spanish and Portuguese word meaning precious or beautiful, may refer to:

== Arts and entertainment ==
- Preciosa (album), by Selena, 1988
- "Preciosa" (song), by Rafael Hernández Marín, 1937, covered by many artists
- Incidental music for Preciosa, by Carl Maria von Weber
- Preciosa (film), a 1965 film set in Puerto Rico
- Preciosa (TV series), a 1998 Mexican telenovela
- Preciosa, the fictional hawk in Marion Zimmer Bradley's novel Hawkmistress!

== Radio stations ==
- La Preciosa 92.3 FM (KSJO), San Jose, Californias
- La Preciosa 101.5 FM (KIZS), Tulsa Metro Area, Oklahoma
- La Preciosa AM 800 (KBFP) Bakersfield, California

== Other uses ==
- Preciosa (corporation), a Czech crystal glass company
- Preciosa, a barangay of Sara, Iloilo, Philippines

== See also ==
- Precious (disambiguation)
- Preciosa Sangre (disambiguation) ('Precious Blood')
- Preciosa-Platanares Mixed Wildlife Refuge, Costa Rica
