= Precious =

Precious may refer to:

== Music ==
- Precious (group), a British female pop group

=== Albums ===
- Precious (Chanté Moore album), 1992
- Precious (Conrad Sewell album), 2023
- Precious (Cubic U album), 1998
- Precious (Ours album), 2002
- Precious (Precious album), 2000
- Precious (soundtrack), the soundtrack album to the 2009 film
- Precious (Sogumm album), 2021

=== Songs ===
- "Precious" (Depeche Mode song), 2005
- "Precious" (The Jam song), 1982
- "Precious" (Annie Lennox song), 1992
- "Precious" (Pretenders song), 1980
- "Precious" (Vivid song), 2010
- "Precious" (Yuna Ito song), 2006
- "Precious", a song by Ateez on the EP Treasure Epilogue: Action to Answer
- "Precious", a song by Conrad Sewell on the album Precious
- "Precious", a song by Jim Jones on the album Pray IV Reign
- "Precious...", a song by Luna Sea on the album Luna Sea
- "Precious", a song by Minipop on the album A New Hope
- "Precious", a 2010 song by Ace of Base

== Film and television ==
- Precious (film), a 2009 American drama film
- Precious (Passions character), an orangutan in the soap opera Passions
- Precious (Boukenger), fictional artifacts in the Japanese tokusatsu series GoGo Sentai Boukenger
- Cure Precious, one of the Pretty Cures in the Japanese anime series Delicious Party Pretty Cure
- Precious the Pug, on The Nut Job

== Literature ==
- "My precious", a reference to the One Ring in the fantasy books The Hobbit and The Lord of the Rings
- Precious Ramotswe, the main character in The No. 1 Ladies' Detective Agency book series
- Precious, a 2009 novel by Sandra Novack

== People ==
- Precious (given name), a list of people with this name
- Paul Ellering (born 1953), American professional wrestling manager who had the ring name "Precious Paul Ellering"
- Precious (wrestling) (born 1955), Canadian professional wrestling valet

== Other uses ==
- Precious Peaks, three mountains on King George Island in the South Shetland Islands
- Precious, a brand of cheese by Sorrento Lactalis
- Precious metal
