= Precious (given name) =

Precious is a predominantly feminine given name derived from the English word meaning "of great worth." It is also in occasional use for males.

It first appeared in the top 1,000 most popular names for girls in the United States in 1978, when it ranked at 989. It was ranked in the top 500 names given to newborn American girls between 1987 and 2002. It has since fallen in popularity and was last ranked in the top 1,000 names for girls in 2010. In 2011, there were 195 newborn American girls given the name; in 2012 there were 154 American girls given the name. In the United States, the name has been used predominantly by African Americans. According to one study, of 454 girls named Precious in California during the 1990s, 431 of them were African American.

It remained a popular name in the Philippines, where it was the ninth most popular name given to newborn girls in 2011. There were 394 newborn Filipino girls named Precious in 2011.

== Women with the name ==
- Precious Adams (born 1994/1995), American ballet dancer
- Precious Imuwahen Ajoonu (born 1985), Nigerian curriculum design expert and writer
- Precious Bedell (born 1954), American activist
- Precious Brady-Davis (born 1985), American politician
- Precious Bryant (1942–2013), American country blues, gospel and folk guitarist
- Precious Chikwendu (born 1989), Nigerian actress and model
- Precious Dede (born 1980), Nigerian female football goalkeeper
- Precious Doe (1997–2001), pseudonym given to the corpse of an initially unidentified female child
- Precious Gondwe, Motswana lawyer and businesswoman
- Precious Hipolito, Filipino actress, newscaster, and politician
- Precious Mustapha (born 1997), British actress
- Precious Lara Quigaman, Filipino actress and beauty queen
- Precious Wilson (born 1957), Jamaican soul singer

== Men with the name ==
- Precious Achiuwa (born 1999), Nigerian basketball player
- Precious Emuejeraye (born 1983), Singaporean footballer
- Precious Makina (born 1985), Zambian boxer
- Precious McKenzie (born 1936), South African-born weightlifter
- Precious Monye (born 1974), Nigerian footballer
- Precious Nwala, Nigerian bishop
- Precious Sekibo (born 1958), Nigerian doctor and former Federal Minister of Transportation
- Precious Ugwu (born 2006), Dutch footballer

== Fictional characters ==
- Precious Ramotswe, the main character in The No. 1 Ladies' Detective Agency book series
- Claireece "Precious" Jones, the main character in the novel Push by Sappire and the 2009 movie adaptation Precious
- Precious, the name given to a coconut in a wig that Howard Moon makes to preserve his sanity, whilst trapped on a desert island on The Mighty Boosh.
