= Golden Hour: Part.4 =

- Digital cover

EP by Ateez
- Released: February 6, 2026
- Genre: K-pop
- Length: 16:05
- Languages: Korean; English
- Labels: KQ; RCA; Legacy

Ateez chronology
Golden Hour: Part.3 (2025)	Golden Hour: Part.4 (2026)	Golden Hour: Part.5 (2026)

Singles from Golden Hour: Part.4
- 1. "Adrenaline" Released: February 6, 2026

Golden Hour: Part.4 is the thirteenth extended play (EP) by South Korean boy band Ateez. It was released on February 6, 2026, through KQ Entertainment, RCA Records, and Legacy Recordings, and consists of five tracks including the title track "Adrenaline". The EP also serves as the continuation of the Golden Hour series.

== Background and release ==
On January 12, KQ Entertainment released a teaser video on Ateez's social media accounts for their 13th EP Golden Hour: Part.4. It serves as the fourth installment of the Golden Hour series, following the two-part 12th EP: Golden Hour: Part.3 and Golden Hour: Part.3 'In Your Fantasy Edition'. The next day, KQ revealed the promotion map which included a variety of contents leading up to the EP's release date. On January 20, KQ announced "Adrenaline" as the title track and the other four songs of the EP. In addition, both Hongjoong and Mingi contributed in writing the lyrics of all tracks. On January 26, KQ released an album preview video for the EP. The teaser utilized a subway setting and visual motifs of digital noise and "hacking" to introduce the album's narrative themes. The music video trailer for "Adrenaline" was released by January 30 and the two teasers on February 4 and 5, respectively. On February 6, Ateez released the album and the title track's music video.

== Composition ==
Golden Hour : Part.4 consists of five tracks that span multiple genres, with Hongjoong and Mingi contributing lyrics to the entire EP. The title track, "Adrenaline", is an EDM-based song characterized by heavy percussion and engine-like sound effects. The EP's opening song is "Ghost", a track in the Trap R&B genre that utilizes a darker melodic palette. The third track, "NASA," is a hip-hop composition featuring a rhythmic, spoken-delivery melody. "On the Road" is a lyrical track that addresses the group's history and shared experiences since their debut. The final track, "Choose", was first released as a digital single on November 17, 2025. It is a fan-dedicated song featuring a warm acoustic arrangement intended to convey a message of long-term commitment to the group's audience.

== Track listing ==
Golden Hour: Part.4 track listing
No.	Title	Lyrics	Music	Arrangement	Length
1.	"Ghost"	Eden; Maddox; Peperoni; Oliv; Door; Balm; Will Jay; Hongjoong; Mingi	Eden; Maddox; Peperoni; Oliv; Will Jay; Door; Ollounder	Eden; Maddox; Peperoni; Oliv; Will Jay; Door; Ollounder	2:47
2.	"Adrenaline"	Eden; Maddox; Oliv; Peperoni; Hongjoong; Mingi	Eden; Maddox; Oliv; Peperoni; Kikoi; Bl$$d	Eden; Maddox; Oliv; Peperoni; Kikoi; Bl$$d	3:39
3.	"NASA"	Eden; Maddox; Oliv; Peperoni; Door; Alex Karlsson; Hongjoong; Mingi	Eden; Maddox; Oliv; Peperoni; Door; Tankzzo; Levi; Karlsson	Eden; Maddox; Oliv; Peperoni; Tankzzo	3:10
4.	"On the Road"	Eden; Maddox; Peperoni; Oliv; Door; Levi; Kikoi; Hongjoong; Mingi	Eden; Maddox; Peperoni; Oliv; Door; Levi; Kikoi; Sakima	Eden; Maddox; Peperoni; Oliv; Kikoi; Sakima	3:23
5.	"Choose"	Eden; Maddox; Peperoni; Oliv; Tankzzo; Balm; Hongjoong; Mingi	Eden; Maddox; Peperoni; Oliv; Will Vaughan; Tankzzo; Balm	Eden; Maddox; Peperoni; Oliv; Vaughan; Tankzzo; Balm	3:06
Total length:					16:05

== Charts ==
=== Weekly charts ===
Weekly chart performance for Golden Hour: Part.4
Chart (2026)	Peak position
Austrian Albums (Ö3 Austria)	67
Belgian Albums (Ultratop Flanders)	20
Belgian Albums (Ultratop Wallonia)	2
Danish Albums (Hitlisten)	40
Hungarian Physical Albums (MAHASZ)	7
Japanese Albums (Oricon)	2
Japanese Combined Albums (Oricon)	2
Japanese Hot Albums (Billboard Japan)	3
Portuguese Albums (AFP)	104
South Korean Albums (Circle)	1
Swedish Physical Albums (Sverigetopplistan)	4
Swiss Albums (Schweizer Hitparade)	56
UK Album Downloads (Official Charts)	11
US Billboard 200	3
US World Albums (Billboard)	1

=== Monthly charts ===
Monthly chart performance for Golden Hour: Part.4
Chart (2026)	Position
Japanese Albums (Oricon)	6
South Korean Albums (Circle)	3

== Certifications ==
Certifications for Golden Hour: Part.4
Region	Certification	Certified units/sales
South Korea (KMCA)	3× Platinum	750,000^{^}
South Korea (KMCA) Poca	Platinum	250,000^{^}
^{^} Shipments figures based on certification alone.

== Release history ==
Release history for Golden Hour: Part.4
Region	Date	Format	Label
South Korea	February 6, 2026	CD; digital download; streaming	KQ
United States	February 6, 2026	CD; digital download; streaming	RCA; Legacy
Various	February 6, 2026	Digital download; streaming	KQ
