= Zero: Fever Epilogue =

2021 EP by Ateez

- Digital cover

EP by Ateez
- Released: December 10, 2021
- Genre: K-pop
- Length: 33:24
- Language: Korean
- Labels: KQ; RCA; Legacy
- Producers: Eden; Ollounder; Leez; Peperoni; Oliv; Maddox; Buddy

Ateez chronology
Zero: Fever Part.3 (2021)	Zero: Fever Epilogue (2021)	Beyond: Zero (2022)

Singles from Zero: Fever Epilogue
- 1. "Turbulence" Released: December 3, 2021; 2. "The Real (Heung version)" Released: December 10, 2021

Zero: Fever Epilogue (stylized in all caps) is the first repackage extended play (EP) by South Korean boy band Ateez. It was released on December 10, 2021, through KQ Entertainment, RCA Records, and Legacy Recordings. It consists of ten tracks, including the singles "Turbulence" and "The Real (Heung version)". The EP debuted atop South Korea Gaon Album Chart and Billboard's World Albums Chart. The group made their second appearance on the Billboard 200 chart with the EP at number 73. The album was certified platinum by the Korea Music Content Association, selling over 407,000 physical copies in December 2021.

== Release and promotion ==
On November 27, 2021, Ateez posted a teaser picture captioned 'Upon the new world' on their social media accounts for the upcoming album, titled Zero: Fever Epilogue. The music video of "Turbulence" was uploaded on December 3. The EP was released on December 10, alongside the music video of "The Real (Heung version)", re-arranged from "The Real" which was released for the final round of Mnet's competitive show Kingdom: Legendary War. Sidetracks "Wave (Overture)", "Wonderland (Symphony No.9 "From the Wonderland")" and "Answer: Ode to Joy" were all first introduced as performances on Kingdom.

Ateez gave the debut performances of "Turbulence" and "The Real (Heung version)" at the 2021 Mnet Asian Music Awards on December 11, a day after the EP release. The group promoted the songs on several music programs, including The Show, Show Champion, Show! Music Core, and Inkigayo. They also guested on Idol Radio and Kiss the Radio for album promotion.

On December 25, Ateez upload a 'Christmas special clip' of the B-side "The Letter". They joined as the series' first guest on the It's Live Original concert show launching on December 30. They brought live band sessions of "Turbulence" and few other songs, as well as a performance of "The Real (Heung version)" filmed in the Daejanggeum Theme Park.

== Track listing ==
Zero: Fever Epilogue
No.	Title	Lyrics	Music	Arrangement	Length
1.	"Turbulence" (야간비행)	Eden; Ollounder; Leez; Peperoni; Oliv; Hongjoong; Mingi	Eden; Ollounder; Leez; Peperoni; Oliv	Eden; Ollounder; Leez; Peperoni; Oliv	3:19
2.	"Be with You"	Eden; Ollounder; Leez; Maddox; Peperoni; Oliv	Eden; Ollounder; Leez; Maddox; Peperoni; Oliv	Eden; Ollounder; Leez; Maddox; Peperoni; Oliv	3:42
3.	"The Letter"	Eden; Ollounder; Leez; Peperoni; Oliv; Hongjoong; Mingi	Eden; Ollounder; Leez; Peperoni; Oliv	Eden; Ollounder; Leez; Peperoni; Oliv	3:51
4.	"Still Here" (Korean version)	Eden; Ollounder; Leez; HLB; Hongjoong; Mingi	Eden; Ollounder; Leez	Ollounder	3:16
5.	"Better" (Korean version)	Eden; Ollounder; Leez; Buddy; Hongjoong; Mingi	Eden; Ollounder; Leez; Buddy	Eden; Ollounder; Leez; Buddy	3:35
6.	"The Real" (Heung version; 멋 (흥:興 Ver.))	Eden; Ollounder; Leez; Peperoni; Oliv; Hongjoong; Mingi	Eden; Ollounder; Leez; Peperoni; Oliv	Eden; Ollounder; Leez; Peperoni; Oliv	3:31
7.	"Wave" (Overture)	Eden; Leez; Buddy; Hongjoong; Mingi	Eden; Leez; Buddy	Eden; Leez	1:43
8.	"Wonderland" (Symphony No.9 "From the Wonderland")	Eden; Leez; Buddy; Ollounder; Hongjoong; Mingi	Eden; Leez; Buddy; Ollounder	Eden; Leez; Buddy; Ollounder	4:18
9.	"Answer: Ode to Joy" (featuring La Poem)	Eden; Ollounder; Leez; Hongjoong; Mingi	Eden; Ollounder; Leez; Buddy	Eden; Ollounder; Leez; Buddy	4:27
10.	"Outro: Over the Horizon"	Eden; Ollounder; Leez; Maddox; Peperoni; Oliv	Eden; Ollounder; Leez; Maddox; Peperoni; Oliv	Eden; Ollounder; Leez; Maddox; Peperoni; Oliv	1:42
Total length:					33:24

== Charts ==
=== Weekly charts ===
Weekly chart performance for Zero: Fever Epilogue
Chart (2021)	Peak position
Belgian Albums (Ultratop Flanders)	35
Belgian Albums (Ultratop Wallonia)	65
Croatian International Albums (HDU)	19
Finnish Albums (Suomen virallinen lista)	12
French Physical Albums (SNEP)	74
Hungarian Albums (MAHASZ)	17
Japanese Albums (Oricon)	9
Japanese Hot Albums (Billboard Japan)	14
South Korean Albums (Gaon)	1
Swedish Physical Albums (Sverigetopplistan)	14
US Billboard 200	73
US Top Album Sales (Billboard)	11
US World Albums (Billboard)	1

=== Monthly charts ===
Monthly chart performance for Zero: Fever Epilogue
Chart (2021)	Peak position
Japanese Albums (Oricon)	19
South Korean Albums (Gaon)	2

=== Year-end charts ===
Year-end chart performance for Zero: Fever Epilogue
Chart (2021)	Position
South Korean Albums (Gaon)	32

== Accolades ==
Year-end Lists
Critic/Publication	List	Work	Rank	Ref.
Genius Korea	15 Best K-Pop Performances of 2021	"Wonderland (Symphony No.9 "From the Wonderland")"	1	

== Certifications ==
Certifications for Zero: Fever Epilogue
Region	Certification	Certified units/sales
South Korea (KMCA)	Platinum	250,000^{^}
^{^} Shipments figures based on certification alone.
