= Hongjoong =

South Korean rapper and singer (born 1998)

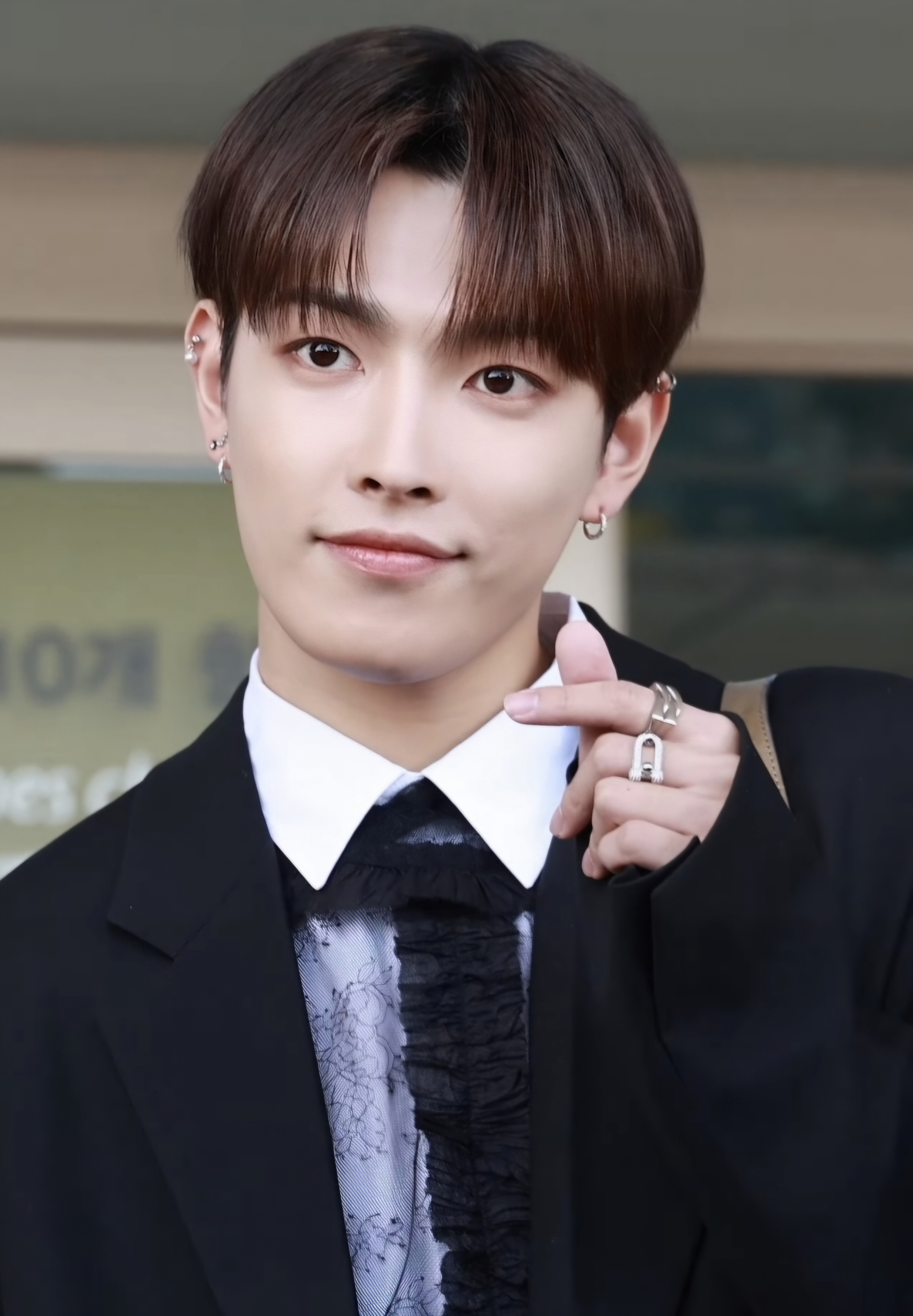
- Hongjoong in June 2024
- Born: Kim Hong-joong; November 7, 1998 (age 28); Anyang, Gyeonggi, South Korea
- Education: Dongan High School; Global Cyber University
- Occupations: Rapper; singer; songwriter; composer
- Musical career
- Genre: K-pop
- Instrument: Vocals
- Years active: 2018–present
- Label: KQ
- Member of: Ateez

Korean name
- Hangul: 김홍중
- RR: Gim Hongjung
- MR: Kim Hongjung

Signature
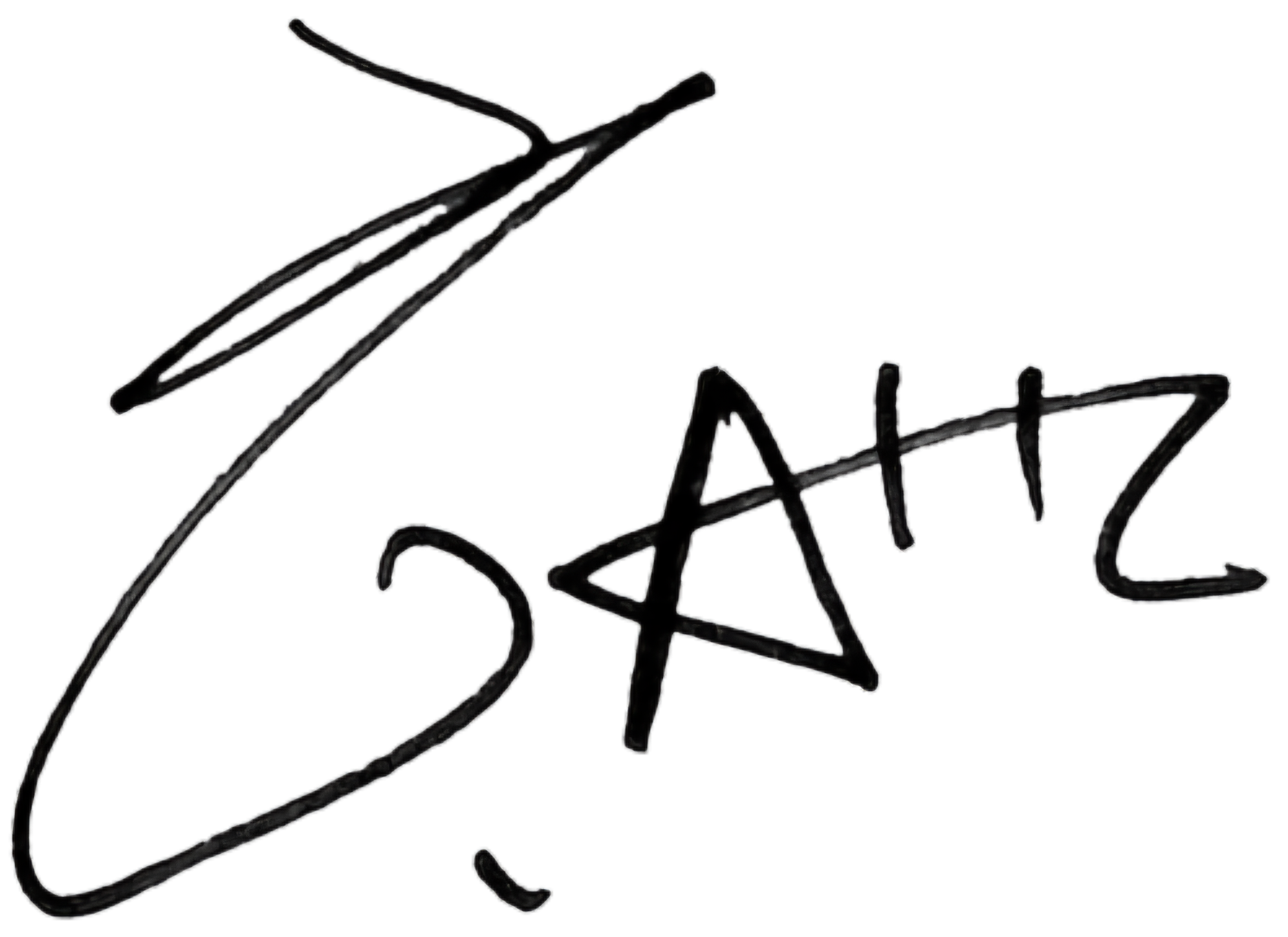

Kim Hong-joong (Korean: 김홍중; born November 7, 1998), mononymously known as Hongjoong, is a South Korean rapper, singer, producer, and songwriter. He debuted as the leader of the South Korean boy band Ateez in 2018. As of November 2026, he has 195 songs credited under his name on the KOMCA.

== Early life ==
Kim Hongjoong was born November 7, 1998, in Anyang, Gyeonggi-do, South Korea. He attended Dongan High School before enrolling at the Global Cyber University. He wrote his first song when he was 16 years old.

== Career ==
=== 2016–2017: Pre-debut ===
Hongjoong sent a letter and a mixtape to his label, KQ Entertainment, expressing interest in becoming an in-house composer. He initially became the first trainee of the company because of his admiration for Block B, a group managed under the same label.

In 2017, Hongjoong was one of the trainees who passed the audition for the JTBC survival reality show Mix Nine. He placed number seven on the "Just Dance" showcase but was eliminated in the tenth episode, with a final ranking of 42.

He was introduced as a member of the pre-debut group "KQ Fellaz" along with seven others, all of whom are now part of the boy group Ateez. During the pre-debut reality show KQ Fellaz American Training, the group released a song composed and produced by Hongjoong titled "From".

=== 2018–present: Debut, solo activities, debut as music director and DJ ===
On October 24, 2018, Hongjoong officially debuted as the leader of KQ Entertainment's first boy group, Ateez with the debut EP Treasure EP.1: All to Zero.

From December 2019 to February 2025, Hongjoong released 8 songs by artists that he covered and interpreted in his own style (adding his own lyrics and arranging) under the project name "BY. HONGJOONG". The covered songs included "Space Oddity" by David Bowie, "Purple Rain" by Prince, "Black or White" by Michael Jackson, "모처럼" by Yoon Jong-shin, "Numb" by Linkin Park, "Lemon Tree" by Fools Garden, "Wonderwall" by Oasis, "Beat it" by Michael Jackson.

Hongjoong and fellow Ateez member Yunho were selected as the new DJs for MBC's Idol Radio Season 3, which aired from September 8, 2022, to December 27, 2023. On June 20, 2023, Hongjoong appeared in the music talk show Lee Mujin Service where he delivered live vocal performances. On November 8, he released the song "A Walker".

On March 11, 2024, singer Chungha released her digital single "Eenie Meenie" featuring Hongjoong, who participated in writing and composing the song. On June 1, Hongjoong appeared in the music talk show I.M on the Beat where he showcased both vocal and rap skills. On August 23, Hongjoong released the song "Why Do You Love" along with a music video.

Hongjoong and fellow Ateez member Jongho took part in KBS2' busking variety show Moving Voices in Germany, which aired from November 2024 to January 2025.

On January 15, 2025, Odetari released his digital single "SMB" featuring Hongjoong, who participated in writing the song. It became Hongjoong's first international collab and second in total. On July 11, 2025, Hongjoong released a solo song "NO1" as part of the Ateez album Golden Hour: Part.3 'In Your Fantasy Edition'. On July 25, 2025, Bradley Simpson released a new version of the song "Almost" featuring Hongjoong.

In May 2026, Hongjoong participated as the main music director for the film Hallucination, which starred his older brother, Kim Bum-joong, in one of the lead roles. On May 29, 2026, Anderson .Paak released the soundtrack album for the movie K-Pops! featuring Hongjoong in the song "PITC (Party In the Corner)". In June 2026, Hongjoong was announced as a part of the line up for EDC Korea under the stage name NO1, marking his first solo festival and debut as DJ. On September 18, 2026, Hongjoong released the collaboration single "Enough" with Bazzi. Hongjoong participated in the entire song creation process: lyrics, composing, arranging and recording.

== Artistry and public image ==
Hongjoong is appreciated as a skilled rapper and producer, his contribution to Chungha’s "Eenie Meenie" was considered one of the top rap verses of 2024 in K-pop. The song "Selfish Waltz" produced by Hongjoong was named a "b-side many K-pop groups would be excited to offer as a title track" according to Consequence magazine. "Selfish Waltz" was also included in "The 50 best K-pop tracks of 2024" by Dazed magazine. Clash magazine named Hongjoong's solo "NO1" as one of the biggest kpop statements of 2025.

Hongjoong has appeared periodically on the Korean Business Research Institute’s male celebrity brand reputation rankings, which measure online searches and engagement. He also has ranked in the combined male and female idol brand reputation lists.

== Other ventures ==
=== Ambassadorship ===
On March 26, 2026, Hongjoong was appointed as the global ambassador for the World Vision 'Global 6K for Water' campaign.

=== Endorsements ===
On July 23, 2025, Hongjoong and fellow member Seonghwa were announced as the new models for the eyewear brand 'The Silent Soul'.

=== Fashion ===
Hongjoong reformed clothes, experimented with various fashion styles throughout his career, often incorporating elements that challenge traditional gender norms. He has stated that on stage, he fuses music with fashion, creating a character for each performance that embodies both elegance and power. He has mentioned wanting to study fashion and start his own fashion line.

Hongjoong had solo-photoshoots for fashion magazines: in 2023 for WWD, in 2024 for Stylecaster, in 2024 1st solo cover and photoshoot for Zipper Japan, in 2025 photoshoot for Elle Korea, solo covers and photoshoot for Singles magazine Japan, in 2026 solo covers and photoshoot for Men's Folio Singapore, photoshoot for Billboard, solo covers and photoshoot for WWD Korea.

On March 4, 2023, Hongjoong made his fashion debut at Balmain Homme 2023 Fall/Winter presentation at Paris Fashion Week. On September 5, Hongjoong was named as a Balmain ambassador and was dubbed the "Balmain Prince" by the fashion brand. On September 27, Hongjoong made his debut appearance as a member of the "Balmain army" by attending Balmain spring-summer 2024 women's collection show and the presentation of the Men's collection on September 29.

On June 21, 2024, Hongjoong attended the Comme des Garçons Homme Plus show in Paris. On September 25, Hongjoong attended the Balmain Spring-Summer 2025 show and on September 28, he attended the Vivienne Westwood Paris Womenswear Spring-Summer 2025 show.

On January 22, 2025, Hongjoong attended the Paul Smith fall 2025 menswear show and on January 26, he attended the Jacquemus fall 2025 show in Paris. On June 29, 2025, Hongjoong attended the Jacquemus show in Versailles, where 2026 Spring-Summer collection "Le Paysan" was presented.

On November 7, 2025, Hongjoong dropped his first fashion collection named Petit Coussin. It featured 24 looks inspired by his childhood and his mother’s children's clothing shop of the same name. The showcase marked the very first time a K-pop idol designed and presented a full fashion collection. On November 12, Hongjoong attended Qeelin Fine Jewelry Exhibition at Seoul Miracle Garden.

On November 13, 2026, Hongjoong's wardrobe and personal items were presented at the pop-up event 'OPEN THE CLOSET' in Seoul to commemorate the 50th anniversary of GORE-TEX products.

=== Philanthropy ===
Since his debut, Hongjoong has actively contributed to the "Polished Man" campaign by consistently painting his pinky fingernail. This led to fans creating fundraising pages on the Polished Man's website, resulting in the collection of hundreds of dollars in 2019 and early 2020. Later in 2020, the group Ateez were announced as the ambassadors for the campaign. As of July 2021, the funds amassed through this collaboration with Polished Man have surpassed $30,000.

In November 2022, Hongjoong donated ₩10 million (US$7,461.15) to World Vision Korea under the name "Atiny", the group's fan base. According to the NGO, the contribution is designated to provide support for the Dreaming Children project.

In November 2023, it was reported that he donated ₩50 million (US$37,305.75) to the Korea Childhood Leukemia Foundation. This donation aims to support children diagnosed with cancer and other incurable diseases. The sum was raised from the proceeds of "Walker A" (Note: A photo exhibition held on his birthday) ticket sales and his added monetary contribution to the cause.

In May 2024, Hongjoong donated ₩50 million (US$37,305.75) to the NGO 'World Vision' in honor of the Children's Day celebrated in Korea. This contribution aims to support youth who take care of family members with illnesses or disabilities. In March 2024, he donated another ₩50 million (US$37,305.75) to the World Vision Global Drinking Water Project, intended to provide communities worldwide with access to clean water, sanitation and more. On May 20, he was appointed to the 'Bob Pierce Honor Club', an accolade designated for major donors who have contributed over ₩100 million to the NGO and have displayed empathy towards various global issues.

In November 2024, Hongjoong and official fan club ATINY, who participated in the '2024 Global 6K for Water Running' (G6K Running) campaign donated ₩60 million (US$44,766.9) to the NGO World Vision'. About 3,400 fans from Korea and abroad participated in the 'virtual running' (running at a time and place of their choice) held on November 1–7, to celebrate Hongjoong's birthday. The event was planned with the aim of empathizing with the difficulties of African children and raising awareness of the severity of water and sanitation issues by walking or running 6 km, the average distance that African children walk every day to get water.

On April 14, 2025, Hongjoong was announced as the brand model of World Vision's 'Global 6K Marathon' Campaign. In May, Hongjoong donated ₩25 million (US$18,652.87) to the NGO 'World Vision' for the domestic dream support project 'Dream Wings Club' in honor of the Children's Day celebrated in Korea. In November, Hongjoong successfully completed the virtual Global 6K Marathon, donating 60 million won ₩60 million (US$44,766.9) to the NGO 'World Vision'.

In November 2026, Hongjoong has raised ₩100 million (US$74,611.5) in donations for children in need of clean water together with fans around the world, 5724 people from both Korea and abroad participated in 'Global 6K Virtual Run' campaign.

== Discography ==
=== As music director ===
Year	Film	Songs	Ref.
2026	Hallucination	"Bleeding Light", "Nothing Left"	

=== As lead artist ===
Title	Year	Sales	Album	Ref.
"Enough" (with Bazzi)	2026	–	Non-album single	

=== As featured artist ===
Title	Year	Peak chart position		Album
Title	Year	KOR	US World	Album
"Eenie Meenie" (Chungha featuring Hongjoong)	2024	104	6	EENIE MEENIE
"SMB" (Odetari featuring Hongjoong)	2025	—	—	Non-album single
"Almost" (Bradley Simpson featuring Hongjoong)	2025	—	—	The Panic Years
"PITC (Party In the Corner)" (Anderson .Paak featuring Hongjoong and Jay Park)	2026	—	—	"K-POPS! (Music from and inspired by K-POPS! Motion Picture)"
"—" denotes releases that did not chart or were not released in that region.

=== Soundtrack appearances ===
Title	Year	Album
"Me Crazy" (with Seonghwa, Yunho, and Wooyoung)	2026	Sealook S2 OST
"Your Journey" (with Seonghwa, Yunho, and Wooyoung)	2026	Sealook S2 OST

=== Unofficial releases ===
Title	Year	Album	Ref.
"Draw & Draw"	2021	Non-album singles	
"A Walker"	2023	Non-album singles	
"Why Do You Love"	2024	Non-album singles	

== Filmography ==
=== Television shows ===
Year	Title	Role	Notes	Ref.
2017–2018	Mix Nine	Contestant	Ranked 42nd overall (Male category)	
2024–2025	Moving Voices	Cast	In Germany	

=== Radio shows ===
Year	Title	Role	Notes	Ref.
2020	Idol Radio	Special DJ	Ep 464; with Mingi	
2020	Idol Radio	Special DJ	Ep 467; with Mingi	
2020	Idol Radio	Special DJ	Ep 470; with Jongho	
2020	Idol Radio	Special DJ	Ep 471; with Yunho	
2020	Idol Radio	Special DJ	Ep 539; with San	
2022	Idol Radio	Special DJ	Ep 106; with San	
2022–2023	Idol Radio	Host	Season 3; with Yunho	

=== Host ===
Year	Title	Notes	Ref.
2020	Show! Music Core	Special host, Episode 665	
2022	The Show	Special host, Episode 305	
2023	Idol Radio Live in Seoul	with Yunho	

== Awards and nominations ==
Name of the award ceremony, year presented, award category, nominee(s) of the award, and the result of the nomination
Award ceremony	Year	Category	Nominee(s)/work(s)	Result	Ref.
Asia Artist Awards	2025	AAA Best Choice	Hongjoong	Won	

== Composition credits ==
All song credits are adapted from the Korea Music Copyright Association's database unless stated otherwise.

Year	Artist	Song	Album	Lyrics	Music
2018	Ateez	"Pirate King" (해적왕)	Treasure EP.1: All to Zero	Yes	No
2018	Ateez	"Treasure"	Treasure EP.1: All to Zero	Yes	No
2018	Ateez	"Twilight"	Treasure EP.1: All to Zero	Yes	No
2018	Ateez	"Stay"	Treasure EP.1: All to Zero	Yes	No
2018	Ateez	"My Way"	Treasure EP.1: All to Zero	Yes	No
2019	Ateez	"HALA HALA (Hearts Awakened, Live Alive)"	Treasure EP.2: Zero to One	Yes	No
2019	Ateez	"Say My Name"	Treasure EP.2: Zero to One	Yes	No
2019	Ateez	"Desire"	Treasure EP.2: Zero to One	Yes	No
2019	Ateez	"Light"	Treasure EP.2: Zero to One	Yes	No
2019	Ateez	"Promise"	Treasure EP.2: Zero to One	Yes	No
2019	Ateez	"From"	Treasure EP.2: Zero to One	Yes	Yes
2019	Eden	"3 Things (feat. Maddox)"	Exhalant	Yes	No
2019	Ateez	"Utopia"	Treasure EP.3: One to All	Yes	No
2019	Ateez	"Illusion"	Treasure EP.3: One to All	Yes	No
2019	Ateez	"Wave"	Treasure EP.3: One to All	Yes	No
2019	Ateez	"Aurora"	Treasure EP.3: One to All	Yes	Yes
2019	Ateez	"Dancing Like Butterfly Wings"	Treasure EP.3: One to All	Yes	No
2019	Ateez	"Wonderland"	Treasure EP.Fin: All to Action	Yes	No
2019	Ateez	"Dazzling Light"	Treasure EP.Fin: All to Action	Yes	No
2019	Ateez	"Mist" (안개)	Treasure EP.Fin: All to Action	Yes	No
2019	Ateez	"Precious (Overture)"	Treasure EP.Fin: All to Action	Yes	No
2019	Ateez	"Win"	Treasure EP.Fin: All to Action	Yes	No
2019	Ateez	"If Without You"	Treasure EP.Fin: All to Action	Yes	No
2019	Ateez	"Thank U" (친구)	Treasure EP.Fin: All to Action	Yes	No
2019	Ateez	"Sunrise"	Treasure EP.Fin: All to Action	Yes	Yes
2019	Ateez	"With U" (걸어가고 있어)	Treasure EP.Fin: All to Action	Yes	No
2019	Ateez	"HALA HALA (Traditional Treatment Mix)"	Treasure EP.Extra: Shift the Map	Yes	No
2019	Ateez	"Pirate King (Overload Mix)"	Treasure EP.Extra: Shift the Map	Yes	No
2019	Ateez	"Treasure (Smoothing Harmonies Mix)"	Treasure EP.Extra: Shift the Map	Yes	No
2019	Ateez	"Utopia (Japanese ver.)"	Treasure EP.Extra: Shift the Map	Yes	No
2019	Ateez	"Say My Name (Flavor of Latin with Juwon Park)"	Treasure EP.Extra: Shift the Map	Yes	No
2019	Ateez	"Illusion (Chillin' with BUDDY Mix)"	Treasure EP.Extra: Shift the Map	Yes	No
2019	Ateez	"Wave (Ollounder's Bold Dynamics Mix)"	Treasure EP.Extra: Shift the Map	Yes	No
2019	Ateez	"Aurora (Japanese ver.)"	Treasure EP.Extra: Shift the Map	Yes	Yes
2019	Ateez	"Twilight (Classic BUDDY Mix)"	Treasure EP.Extra: Shift the Map	Yes	No
2019	Ateez	"Promise (Notation from Senor Juwon Park)"	Treasure EP.Extra: Shift the Map	Yes	No
2020	Ateez				No
2020	Ateez	"Answer"	Treasure Epilogue: Action to Answer	Yes	No
2020	Ateez	"Horizon" (지평선)	Treasure Epilogue: Action to Answer	Yes	Yes
2020	Ateez	"Star 1117"	Treasure Epilogue: Action to Answer	Yes	No
2020	Ateez	"Precious"	Treasure Epilogue: Action to Answer	Yes	No
2020	Ateez	"Answer (Japanese ver.)"	Treasure EP. Map to Answer	Yes	No
2020	Ateez	"Better"	Treasure EP. Map to Answer	Yes	No
2020	Ateez	"Wonderland (Sean Oh's Skrt Remix)	Treasure EP. Map to Answer	Yes	No
2020	Ateez	"Sunrise (Atmospheric Mix by Spacecowboy)"	Treasure EP. Map to Answer	Yes	Yes
2020	Ateez	"Star 1117 (Buddy's Melody Mix)"	Treasure EP. Map to Answer	Yes	No
2020	Ateez	"Fever"	Zero: Fever Part.1	Yes	No
2020	Ateez	"Thanxx"	Zero: Fever Part.1	Yes	No
2020	Ateez	"To The Beat" (춤을 춰)	Zero: Fever Part.1	Yes	No
2020	Ateez	"Inception"	Zero: Fever Part.1	Yes	No
2020	Ateez	"Good Lil Boy"	Zero: Fever Part.1	Yes	Yes
2021	Ateez	"Fireworks (불놀이야 (I'm The One))"	Zero: Fever Part.2	Yes	No
2021	Ateez	"The Leaders" (선도부)	Zero: Fever Part.2	Yes	No
2021	Ateez	"Time Of Love"	Zero: Fever Part.2	Yes	No
2021	Ateez	"Take Me Home"	Zero: Fever Part.2	Yes	No
2021	Ateez	"Celebrate"	Zero: Fever Part.2	Yes	Yes
2021	Ateez	"Take Me Home (English ver.)"	Zero: Fever Part.2	Yes	No
2021	Ateez	"I'm The One (Heart-Topping ver.)"	Zero: Fever Part.2	Yes	No
2021	Mayfly (Note: Hongjoong, Minhyuk of BTOB and 3Racha)	"Playing with Colours"	-	Yes	Yes
2021	Ateez	"The Real"	Kingdom 'Final: Who Is The King?'	Yes	No
2021	Rain, Monsta X, Brave Girls, & Ateez	"Summer Taste"	Taste of Korea	Yes	No
2021	Kim Jong-kook & Ateez	"Be My Lover"	Season Songs	Yes	Yes
2021	Ateez	"White Love"	Season Songs	Yes	No
2021	Ateez	"Eternal Sunshine"	Zero: Fever Part.3	Yes	No
2021	Ateez	"Feeling Like I Do"	Zero: Fever Part.3	Yes	No
2021	Ateez	"Deja Vu"	Zero: Fever Part.3	Yes	No
2021	Ateez	"Rocky"	Zero: Fever Part.3	Yes	Yes
2021	Ateez	"All About You"	Zero: Fever Part.3	Yes	Yes
2021	Ateez	"Not Too Late"	Zero: Fever Part.3	Yes	No
2021	Ateez	"Turbulence" (야간비행)	Zero: Fever Epilogue	Yes	No
2021	Ateez	"The Letter"	Zero: Fever Epilogue	Yes	No
2021	Ateez	"Still Here (Korean Ver.)"	Zero: Fever Epilogue	Yes	No
2021	Ateez	"Better (Korean Ver.)"	Zero: Fever Epilogue	Yes	No
2021	Ateez	"The Real (흥 : 興 Ver.)"	Zero: Fever Epilogue	Yes	No
2021	Ateez	"Wave (Overture)"	Zero: Fever Epilogue	Yes	No
2021	Ateez	"Wonderland (Symphony No.9 "From The Wonderland")"	Zero: Fever Epilogue	Yes	No
2021	Ateez	"Answer (Ode to Joy)"	Zero: Fever Epilogue	Yes	No
2022	Ateez	"Don't Stop"		Yes	No
2022	Ateez	"Deja Vu (Japanese Ver.)"	Beyond: Zero	Yes	No
2022	Ateez	"Rocky (Boxers ver.)"	Beyond: Zero	Yes	Yes
2022	Ateez	"The King"	Beyond: Zero	Yes	No
2022	Ateez	"Turbulence (夜間飛行) (Japanese Ver.)"	Beyond: Zero	Yes	No
2022	Ateez	"Take Me Home (Japanese Ver.)"	Beyond: Zero	Yes	No
2022	Ateez	"Fireworks (I'm The One) (Japanese Ver.)"	Beyond: Zero	Yes	No
2022	Ateez	"Sector 1"	The World EP.1: Movement	Yes	No
2022	Ateez	"Cyberpunk"	The World EP.1: Movement	Yes	No
2022	Ateez	"Guerrilla"	The World EP.1: Movement	Yes	No
2022	Ateez	"The Ring"	The World EP.1: Movement	Yes	No
2022	Ateez	"WDIG (Where Do I Go)"	The World EP.1: Movement	Yes	No
2022	Ateez	"New World"	The World EP.1: Movement	Yes	No
2022	Ateez	"Poppia KCON 2022 LA Signature Song"	-	Yes	No
2022	Hongjoong and Yunho	"Signal Song"	(Note: Idol Radio 3 opening song)	Yes	Yes
2022	Ateez	"Let's Get Together"	Mimicus OST	Yes	No
2022	Ateez	"Paradigm"	The World EP.Paradigm	Yes	No
2022	Ateez	"Cyberpunk (Japanese Ver.)"	The World EP.Paradigm	Yes	No
2022	Ateez	"Guerrilla (Flag Ver.)"	The World EP.Paradigm	Yes	No
2022	Ateez	"New World (Japanese Ver.)"	The World EP.Paradigm	Yes	No
2022	Ateez	"Like That"	Lookism OST	Yes	No
2022	Ateez	"Halazia"	Spin Off: From the Witness	Yes	No
2022	Ateez	"Win (June One of Glen Check Remix)"	Spin Off: From the Witness	Yes	No
2022	Ateez	"I'm The One (Eden-ary Remix)"	Spin Off: From the Witness	Yes	No
2022	Ateez	"Take Me Home (IDIOTAPE Remix)"	Spin Off: From the Witness	Yes	No
2023	Ateez	"Limitless"	Limitless	Yes	No
2023	Ateez	"Diamond"	Limitless	Yes	No
2023	Xikers	"The Tricky's Secret"	House of Tricky: Doorbell Ringing	Yes	Yes
2023	Xikers	"Doorbell Ringing"	House of Tricky: Doorbell Ringing	Yes	Yes
2023	Xikers	"Tricky House" (도깨비집)	House of Tricky: Doorbell Ringing	Yes	Yes
2023	Xikers	"Dynamic (清亮 (청량))"	House of Tricky: Doorbell Ringing	No	Yes
2023	Xikers	"Rockstar"	House of Tricky: Doorbell Ringing	Yes	Yes
2023	Xikers	"Xikey"	House of Tricky: Doorbell Ringing	Yes	Yes
2023	Xikers	"Oh My Gosh"	House of Tricky: Doorbell Ringing	Yes	Yes
2023	Ateez	"This World"	The World EP.2: Outlaw	Yes	No
2023	Ateez	"Dune"	The World EP.2: Outlaw	Yes	No
2023	Ateez	"Bouncy (K-Hot Chilli Peppers)"	The World EP.2: Outlaw	Yes	No
2023	Ateez	"Django"	The World EP.2: Outlaw	Yes	No
2023	Ateez	"Wake Up" (최면)	The World EP.2: Outlaw	Yes	No
2023	Ateez	"Outlaw"	The World EP.2: Outlaw	Yes	No
2023	Xikers	"Skater"	House of Tricky: How To Play	Yes	Yes
2023	Xikers	"Home Boy"	House of Tricky: How To Play	Yes	Yes
2023	Xikers	"Do or Die"	House of Tricky: How To Play	Yes	Yes
2023	Xikers	"Koong"	House of Tricky: How To Play	Yes	Yes
2023	Xikers	"Run"	House of Tricky: How To Play	Yes	Yes
2023	Xikers	"Sunny Side"	House of Tricky: How To Play	Yes	Yes
2023	Hongjoong	"A Walker"	-	Yes	Yes
2023	Ateez	"We Know"	The World EP.Fin: Will	Yes	No
2023	Ateez	"Emergency"	The World EP.Fin: Will	Yes	No
2023	Ateez	"Crazy Form" (미친 폼)	The World EP.Fin: Will	Yes	No
2023	Ateez	"Arriba"	The World EP.Fin: Will	Yes	No
2023	Ateez	"Silver Light"	The World EP.Fin: Will	Yes	No
2023	Ateez	"Dreamy Day" (꿈날)	The World EP.Fin: Will	Yes	Yes
2023	Ateez	"MATZ"	The World EP.Fin: Will	Yes	Yes
2023	Ateez	"Deja Vu (Film Ver.)" (Vinyl (X ver.) only)	The World EP.Fin: Will	Yes	No
2023	Ateez	"Eternal Sunshine (Outdoor Ver.)" (Vinyl (X ver.) only)	The World EP.Fin: Will	Yes	No
2024	Ateez	"Not Okay"	Not Okay	Yes	No
2024	Ateez	"Days"	Not Okay	Yes	No
2024	Xikers	"We Don't Stop"	House of Tricky: Trial And Error	Yes	No
2024	Xikers	"Red Sun"	House of Tricky: Trial And Error	Yes	No
2024	Xikers	"Every Flavor Jelly" (온갖 맛이 나는 젤리)	House of Tricky: Trial And Error	Yes	No
2024	Chung Ha	"Eenie Meenie"	Eenie Meenie	Yes	Yes
2024	Ateez	"Blind"	Golden Hour: Part.1	Yes	No
2024	Ateez	"Work"	Golden Hour: Part.1	Yes	No
2024	Ateez	"Empty Box"	Golden Hour: Part.1	Yes	No
2024	Ateez	"Shaboom"	Golden Hour: Part.1	Yes	No
2024	Ateez	"Siren"	Golden Hour: Part.1	Yes	No
2024	Ateez	"Work Pt.2"		Yes	No
2024	Ateez	"Work Pt.3"		Yes	No
2024	Ateez	"Work Pt.4"		Yes	No
2024	Hongjoong	"Why Do You Love"	-	Yes	Yes
2024	Be:First and Ateez	"Hush-Hush"		Yes	No
2024	Ateez	"Birthday"	Birthday	Yes	No
2024	Ateez	"Royal"	Birthday	Yes	No
2024	Ateez	"Forevermore	Birthday	Yes	No
2024	Ateez	"Arriba (Light ver.)"	Golden Hour Part.1 'Work To Live ver.'	Yes	No
2024	Ateez	"Guerrilla (Flag ver.)"	Golden Hour Part.1 'Work To Live ver.'	Yes	No
2024	Ateez	"Silver Light (Light ver.)"	Golden Hour Part.1 'Work To Live ver.'	Yes	No
2024	Ateez	"Utopia (Finale ver.)"	Golden Hour Part.1 'Work To Live ver.'	Yes	No
2024	Ateez	"The Real (Light ver.)"	Golden Hour Part.1 'Work To Live ver.'	Yes	No
2024	Ateez	"Bulnoriya (I m the One)(Light ver.)"	Golden Hour Part.1 'Work To Live ver.'	Yes	No
2024	Ateez	"Turbulence (Orchestra ver.)"	Golden Hour Part.1 'Work To Live ver.'	Yes	No
2024	Yunho	"Be Alright"	-	Yes	Yes
2024	Ateez	"Deep Dive"	Golden Hour: Part.2	Yes	No
2024	Ateez	"Ice on My Teeth"	Golden Hour: Part.2	Yes	No
2024	Ateez	"Man on Fire"	Golden Hour: Part.2	Yes	No
2024	Ateez	"Enough"	Golden Hour: Part.2	Yes	No
2024	Ateez	"Selfish Waltz"	Golden Hour: Part.2	Yes	Yes
2024	San	"Snowflake"	-	Yes	Yes
2025
2025	Odetari and Hongjoong	"SMB"		Yes	No
2025	Hongjoong	"The Glory"	Petit Coussin	Yes	Yes
2025	Hongjoong	"The Edge of Tomorrow"	Petit Coussin	Yes	Yes
2025	Hongjoong	"Playground 1998"	Petit Coussin	Yes	Yes
2025	Hongjoong	"Petit Coussin"	Petit Coussin	Yes	Yes
2025	Hongjoong	"Echoes"	Petit Coussin	Yes	Yes
2025	Bradley Simpson and Hongjoong	"Almost"		Yes	Yes
2025	Ateez	"Lemon Drop"	Golden Hour: Part.3	Yes	No
2025	Ateez	"Masterpiece"	Golden Hour: Part.3	Yes	No
2025	Ateez	"Now This House Ain't a Home"	Golden Hour: Part.3	Yes	No
2025	Ateez	"Castle"	Golden Hour: Part.3	Yes	No
2025	Ateez	"In Your Fantasy"	Golden Hour: Part.3	Yes	No
2025	Ateez	"In Your Fantasy" (Korean version)	Golden Hour: Part.3	Yes	No
2025	Ateez	"NO1" (Hongjoong solo)	Golden Hour: Part.3	Yes	Yes
2025	Ateez	"Skin" (Seonghwa solo)	Golden Hour: Part.3	Yes	Yes
2025	Ateez	"Slide to Me" (Yunho solo)	Golden Hour: Part.3	Yes	Yes
2025	Ateez	"Legacy" (Yeosang solo)	Golden Hour: Part.3	Yes	Yes
2025	Ateez	"Creep" (San solo)	Golden Hour: Part.3	Yes	Yes
2025	Ateez	"Sagittarius" (Wooyoung solo)	Golden Hour: Part.3	Yes	Yes
2025	Ateez	"Ash"	Ashes to Light	Yes	No
2025	Ateez	"12 Midnight"	Ashes to Light	Yes	No
2025	Ateez	"Tippy Toes"	Ashes to Light	Yes	No
2025	Ateez	"Face"	Ashes to Light	Yes	No
2025	Ateez	"Crescendo"	Ashes to Light	Yes	No
2025	Ateez	"Waiting for You"	Last Summer OST	Yes	No
2026	Ateez	"Adrenaline"	Golden Hour: Part.4	Yes	No
2026	Ateez	"NASA"	Golden Hour: Part.4	Yes	No
2026	Ateez	"On The Road"	Golden Hour: Part.4	Yes	No
2026	Ateez	"Choose"	Golden Hour: Part.4	Yes	No
2026	Ateez	"Ghost"	Golden Hour: Part.4	Yes	No
2026	Ateez	"Adrenaline (NO1 ver.)"		Yes	Yes
2026	Ateez	"Bad"	Golden Hour: Part.5	Yes	No
2026	Ateez	"Mamacita"	Golden Hour: Part.5	Yes	No
2026	Ateez	"Toxin"	Golden Hour: Part.5	Yes	No
2026	Ateez	"Fallin"	Golden Hour: Part.5	Yes	No
2026	Hongjoong and Bazzi	"ENOuGH"		Yes	Yes
2026	Ateez	"Up"	Golden Hour: Part.6	Yes	No
2026	Ateez	"Drip"	Golden Hour: Part.6	Yes	No
2026	Ateez	"Anemia"	Golden Hour: Part.6	Yes	No
2026	Ateez	"Hollow victory"	Golden Hour: Part.6	Yes	No
2026	Ateez	"Faith"	Golden Hour: Part.6	Yes	No
