= Treasure EP.3: One to All =

- Digital cover

EP by Ateez
- Released: June 10, 2019
- Recorded: 2019
- Genre: K-pop
- Length: 18:04
- Language: Korean
- Label: KQ Entertainment

Ateez chronology
Treasure EP.2: Zero to One (2019)	Treasure EP.3: One to All (2019)	Treasure EP.Fin: All to Action (2019)

Singles from Treasure EP.3: One to All
- 1. "Illusion" / "Wave" Released: June 10, 2019; 2. "Aurora" Released: July 8, 2019

Treasure EP.3: One to All is the third extended play by South Korean boy band Ateez. It was released on June 10, 2019. It debuted at number two on the Gaon Album Chart, as well as the top 10 of the US Billboard World Albums and Top Heatseekers charts. On May 27, two performance videos were released for the tracks "Illusion" and "Wave". A fan vote was held to decide which song would be chosen as the EP's single. It was later revealed on the album's release date that both songs would serve as singles.

== Track listing ==
No.	Title	Writer(s)	Producer(s)	Length
1.	"Utopia"	Eden, Leez, Buddy, Hongjoong, Mingi	Eden, Leez, Buddy	3:59
2.	"Illusion"	Eden, Leez, Buddy, Hongjoong, Mingi	Eden, Leez, Buddy	3:30
3.	"Crescent"		Eden, Buddy, Leez, Ollounder	0:46
4.	"Wave"	Eden, Leez, Buddy, Hongjoong, Mingi	Eden, Leez, Buddy	3:23
5.	"Aurora"	Eden, Hongjoong, Ollounder, Leez, Buddy, Mingi	Eden, Hongjoong, Ollounder, Leez, Buddy	3:24
6.	"Dancing Like Butterfly Wings"	Eden, Ollounder, Leez, Hongjoong, Mingi	Eden, Ollounder, Leez	3:02
Total length:				18:04

== Charts ==
Weekly charts
Chart (2019–20)	Peak position
Australian Digital Albums (ARIA)	35
Hungarian Albums (MAHASZ)	14
Japanese Albums (Oricon)	25
Polish Albums (ZPAV)	49
South Korean Albums (Gaon)	2
US Heatseekers Albums (Billboard)	9
US World Albums (Billboard)	8

Year-end charts
Chart (2019)	Position
South Korean Albums (Gaon)	39

== Accolades ==
Year-end lists
Critic/Publication	List	Song	Rank	Ref.
BuzzFeed	Best K-Pop Music Videos of 2019	"Wave"	26	
BuzzFeed	37 of the Best K-Pop Songs of 2019, According to Fans	"Illusion"	12	
MTV	The Best K-Pop B-Sides of 2019	"Utopia"	13	
Sound Digest	Top 16 K-Pop Songs of 2019	"Wave"	6	

Music Program Awards
Song	Program	Date
"Wave"	M Countdown (Mnet)	June 20, 2019
"Wave"	The Show (SBS MTV)	June 25, 2019
