= Zero: Fever Part.2 =

Zero: Fever Part. 2
- Digital cover

EP by Ateez
- Released: March 1, 2021
- Genre: K-pop
- Length: 24:07
- Language: Korean; English
- Label: KQ Entertainment

Ateez chronology
Zero: Fever Part.1 (2020)	Zero: Fever Part. 2 (2021)	Into the A to Z (2021)

Singles from Zero: Fever Part 2
- 1. "Fireworks (I'm the One)" Released: March 1, 2021

Zero: Fever Part.2 is the sixth extended play (EP) by South Korean boy group Ateez. It was released on March 1, 2021, with the track "Fireworks (I'm the One)" serving as lead single. The physical album comes in three versions: A, Diary, and Z, and received over 350,000 pre-orders, exceeding their previous release, Zero: Fever Part.1, by over 100,000 orders. The album is composed of seven tracks, and incorporates different genres such as hip hop, EDM, funk, R&B and soul.

Commercially, the album debuted at number one on South Korea's Gaon Album Chart, and number eight on Billboard World Albums Chart. The album's lead single, "Fireworks (I'm the One)", is Ateez's first song to chart on the Gaon Digital Chart, peaking at number 148. Zero: Fever Part.2 was certified double platinum on July 8, 2021 by Gaon Music Chart, for sales of over 500,000 physical copies.

== Release and promotion ==
A 'handwritten lyric video' of sidetrack "Celebrate" was premiered on November 17, 2020, as a 2nd anniversary celebration of Ateez's fandom, Atiny. The video was later listed private. On February 5, 2021, a teaser picture was posted on official social media accounts, and a new album titled Zero: Fever Part.2 was confirmed two days later.

The album was released worldwide in forms of digital download, streaming and CD on March 1, 2021, alongside a music video for lead single "Fireworks (I'm the One)". The group promoted the album on multiple South Korean music programs, including M! Countdown, Music Bank, Show! Music Core, Inkigayo, The Show, and Show Champion, with performances of the title song and also "Celebrate". They won a music show award with "Fireworks (I'm the One)" on March 9's The Show. A special 'Holdings version' music video of "Time of Love" from their variety show Salary Lupin Ateez was uploaded on March 11, and a special video of "Celebrate" was released by Ateez on March 14. Member Mingi was absent from music video filming and promotion activities due to his hiatus. However, he has taken part in audio recording of the tracks on the album.

== Track listing ==
Zero: Fever Part.2 track listing
No.	Title	Lyrics	Music	Arrangement	Length
1.	"Fireworks (I'm the One)" (불놀이야; Bulnoriya)	Eden, Ollounder, Leez, Hongjoong, Mingi	Eden, Ollounder, Leez, Buddy	Eden, Ollounder, Leez, Buddy	3:29
2.	"The Leaders" (선도부; Seondobu)	Eden, HLB, Ollounder, Hongjoong, Mingi	Eden, HLB, Ollounder, Peperoni, Oliv	Eden, Ollounder, Peperoni, Oliv	3:12
3.	"Time of Love"	Eden, Ollounder, Leez, Peperoni, Oliv, Hongjoong, Mingi	Eden, Ollounder, Leez, Peperoni, Oliv	Eden, Ollounder, Leez, Peperoni, Oliv	2:56
4.	"Take Me Home"	Eden, Leez, Ollounder, Hongjoong, Mingi	Eden, Leez, Eom Taewon, Ollounder	Eden, Leez, Eom Taewon	3:41
5.	"Celebrate"	Eden, Hongjoong, Ollounder, Leez, Peperoni, Oliv, Song Mingi	Eden, Hongjoong, Ollounder, Leez, Peperoni, Oliv	Eden, Hongjoong, Ollounder, Leez, Peperoni, Oliv	3:16
6.	"Take Me Home" (English version)	Eden, Leez, Ollounder, Hongjoong, Mingi	Eden, Leez, Eom Taewon, Ollounder	Eden, Leez, Eom Taewon	3:41
7.	"I'm the One" (Heat-Topping version)	Eden, Leez, Ollounder, Hongjoong, Mingi	Eden, Leez, Ollounder, Buddy	Peperoni, Oliv	3:52
Total length:					24:07

== Charts ==
=== Weekly charts ===
Weekly chart performance for Zero: Fever Part.2
Chart (2021)	Peak position
Belgian Albums (Ultratop Flanders)	113
Belgian Albums (Ultratop Wallonia)	100
Finnish Albums (Suomen virallinen lista)	9
Hungarian Albums (MAHASZ)	18
Japanese Albums (Oricon)	10
Polish Albums (ZPAV)	36
South Korean Albums (Gaon)	1
US Heatseekers Albums (Billboard)	9
US Indie Store Album Sales (Billboard)	12
US World Albums (Billboard)	8

=== Monthly charts ===
Monthly chart performance for Zero: Fever Part.2
Chart (2021)	Peak position
Japanese Albums (Oricon)	35
South Korean Albums (Gaon)	4

=== Year-end charts ===
Year-end chart performance for Zero: Fever Part.2
Chart (2021)	Position
South Korean Albums (Gaon)	26

== Accolades ==
Year-end listicles
Critic/Publication	List	Work	Rank	Ref.
Genius Korea	20 Best B-Sides of 2021 by Genius Korea	"Take Me Home"	1	
Rolling Stone India	21 Best Korean Music Videos of 2021	“Fireworks (I’m the One)”	17	

Music program awards
Song	Program	Date	Ref.
"Fireworks (I'm the One)"	The Show (SBS MTV)	March 9, 2021	

== Certifications ==
Certifications for Zero: Fever Part.2
Region	Certification	Certified units/sales
South Korea (KMCA)	2× Platinum	500,000^{^}
^{^} Shipments figures based on certification alone.
