= Zero: Fever Part.3 =

- Digital cover

EP by Ateez
- Released: September 13, 2021
- Recorded: 2021
- Genre: K-pop
- Length: 19:42
- Language: Korean
- Label: KQ Entertainment; RCA; Legacy

Ateez chronology
Season Songs (2021)	Zero: Fever Part.3 (2021)	Zero: Fever Epilogue (2021)

Singles from Zero: Fever Part 3
- 1. "Deja Vu" Released: September 13, 2021; 2. "Eternal Sunshine" Released: October 4, 2021

Zero: Fever Part.3 is the seventh extended play (EP) by South Korean boy group Ateez. It was released on September 13, 2021, with "Deja Vu" and "Eternal Sunshine" serving as lead singles. The physical album comes in three versions: A, Diary, and Z. The EP is composed of six tracks.

Commercially, Zero: Fever Part.3 received over 810,000 pre-orders, which was more than the double of their previous release, Zero: Fever Part.2. The EP debuted at number one on Billboard's World Albums Chart and the group reached a new peak on Billboard's World Digital Songs Chart with "Deja Vu" at number four. It also marked Ateez's first appearance on the Billboard 200, with the EP debuting at number 42. Ateez also topped the Billboard Emerging Artists chart after the album release. The album was certified double platinum with over 737,000 physical sales in South Korea in 2021.

== Release and promotion ==
On September 13, Zero: Fever Part.3 was officially released worldwide. The lead single, "Deja Vu", was voted on by fans in competition with track "Eternal Sunshine". On the same day, a media showcase was held and an online fan showcase was live-streamed on Universe. Ateez began their music program promotion with live performances of lead single “Deja Vu” and sidetrack “Not Too Late” starting from M! Countdown on September 16. They continued on with performances on Music Bank, Show! Music Core, Inkigayo, The Show and Show Champion. On September 22, they received their sixth music show win on Show Champion with "Deja Vu". Ateez also made other television appearances to promote the album, performing “Deja Vu” and “Not Too Late” on MBC M's Weekly Idol and KBS' You Hee-yeol's Sketchbook. They guested on radio shows including KBS Cool FM's Kiss the Radio and Volume Up.

On October 4, the music video of the other title song “Eternal Sunshine” was uploaded. Ateez began another round of promotion on music programs with the single starting from October 7’s M! Countdown. On October 31, a Halloween version performance video of “Deja Vu” was released, in tradition of their annual Halloween performance since 2018.

== Track listing ==
Zero: Fever Part.3 track listing
No.	Title	Lyrics	Music	Arrangement	Length
1.	"Eternal Sunshine"	Eden, Ollounder, Leez, Hongjoong, Mingi	Eden, Ollounder, Leez, Peperoni, Oliv	Eden, Ollounder, Leez, Peperoni, Oliv	3:29
2.	"Feeling Like I Do"	Eden, Ollounder, Leez, Hongjoong, Mingi	Eden, Ollounder, Leez, Peperoni, Oliv	Eden, Ollounder, Leez, Peperoni, Oliv	3:17
3.	"Deja Vu"	Eden, Ollounder, Leez, Peperoni, Oliv, Hongjoong, Mingi	Eden, Ollounder, Leez, Peperoni, Oliv	Eden, Ollounder, Leez, Peperoni, Oliv	3:16
4.	"Rocky"	Eden, Leez, Ollounder, Hongjoong, Mingi	Eden, Leez, Hongjoong, Ollounder, Peperoni, Oliv	Eden, Leez, Hongjoong, Ollounder, Peperoni, Oliv	3:08
5.	"All About You"	Eden, Hongjoong, Ollounder, Buddy, Maddox, Mingi	Eden, Hongjoong, Ollounder, Buddy, Maddox	Eden, Hongjoong, Ollounder, Buddy	2:56
6.	"Not Too Late" (밤하늘)	Eden, Leez, Ollounder, Hongjoong, Mingi	Eden, Leez, Ollounder, Peperoni, Oliv	Eden, Leez, Ollounder, Peperoni, Oliv	3:34
Total length:					19:42

== Charts ==
=== Weekly charts ===
Weekly chart performance for Zero: Fever Part.3
Chart (2021)	Peak position
Belgian Albums (Ultratop Flanders)	47
Belgian Albums (Ultratop Wallonia)	103
Croatian International Albums (HDU)	18
Finnish Albums (Suomen virallinen lista)	12
Hungarian Albums (MAHASZ)	14
Japanese Albums (Oricon)	9
Japanese Hot Albums (Billboard Japan)	45
Polish Albums (ZPAV)	34
South Korean Albums (Gaon)	2
UK Album Downloads (OCC)	28
US Billboard 200	42
US Top Album Sales (Billboard)	6
US World Albums (Billboard)	1

=== Monthly charts ===
Monthly chart performance for Zero: Fever Part.3
Chart (2021)	Peak position
Japanese Albums (Oricon)	27
South Korean Albums (Gaon)	2

=== Year-end charts ===
Year-end chart performance for Zero: Fever Part.3
Chart (2021)	Position
South Korean Albums (Gaon)	18

== Accolades ==
Awards and nominations
Year	Organization	Award	Work	Result	Ref.
2022	Golden Disc Awards	Album Bonsang	Zero: Fever Part.3	Nominated	

Year-end lists
Critic/Publication	List	Work	Rank	Ref.
Billboard	25 Best K-Pop Songs of 2021: Critics’ Picks	"Deja Vu"	17	
Tidal	Best of K-Pop 2021	"Deja Vu"	—N/a	

Music program awards
Song	Program	Date	Ref.
"Deja Vu"	Show Champion (MBC M)	September 22, 2021	

== Certifications ==
Certifications for Zero: Fever Part 3
Region	Certification	Certified units/sales
South Korea (KMCA)	3× Platinum	750,000^{^}
^{^} Shipments figures based on certification alone.
