= The World EP.1: Movement =

2022 EP by Ateez

- Digital cover

EP by Ateez
- Released: July 29, 2022
- Genre: K-pop
- Length: 22:20
- Language: Korean
- Labels: KQ; RCA; Legacy
- Producers: Eden; Ollounder; Leez; Peperoni; Oliv; Maddox; Buddy; Dwayne; Neko

Ateez chronology
| Beyond: Zero (2022) | The World EP.1: Movement (2022) | The World EP. Paradigm (2022) |

Singles from The World EP.1: Movement
- 1. "Guerrilla" Released: July 29, 2022

The World EP.1: Movement is the eighth extended play (EP) by South Korean boy band Ateez. It was released on July 29, 2022, through KQ Entertainment, RCA Records, and Legacy Recordings. It consists of seven tracks, including the single "Guerrilla".

== Release and promotion ==
On April 23, fans noticed several posters both in Hongdae, Seoul and outside the venue of Ateez's concert in Madrid, Spain. The posters featured a QR code leading to an unlisted video teasing something unknown in July 2022.

On June 28, fans who attended the recording of Ateez's special performance on The Show were sent an audio file named "Propaganda" from "Ateez" through AirDrop and Bluetooth. The group also posted a QR code leading to the same audio on their social media accounts before immediately deleting it on the same day. On July 1, the group released a second teaser, along with a video titled "Wake Up, The World", confirming a new album named The World EP.1: Movement would be released on July 29. A third teaser was released on July 2 alongside the phrase "Lies Control Rules", followed by a fourth on July 3 titled "Are you seeing this? Eyes in the sky". On July 4, Ateez released the album's promotion map.

On July 28, Ateez held a showcase for the upcoming album, and performed the lead single "Guerrilla" and sidetrack "Sector 1" for the first time. The World EP.1: Movement was officially released worldwide on July 29.

== Commercial performance ==
On July 24, 2022, pre-orders for The World EP.1: Movement surpassed 1.1 million copies, surpassing Ateez's previous career high of 810,000 pre-orders for Zero: Fever Part.3. Album sales of The World EP.1: Movement on the first week was over 930,000 physical copies, and the EP topped South Korea's Circle Album Chart for two consecutive weeks. The album charted at number 3 on Billboard 200 in the United States, which was the first top 10 on the main chart for Ateez. It also landed on number 2 on both Billboard's Top Album Sales and Top Current Album Sales Chart. It was certified million by the Korea Music Content Association in September.

== Track listing ==
The World EP.1: Movement track listing
| No. | Title | Lyrics | Music | Arrangement | Length |
|---|---|---|---|---|---|
| 1. | "Propaganda" | Eden; Ollounder; Leez; Peperoni; Oliv; Dwayne; Neko | Eden; Ollounder; Leez; Peperoni; Oliv | Eden; Ollounder; Leez; Peperoni; Oliv | 1:17 |
| 2. | "Sector 1" | Eden; Ollounder; Leez; Maddox; Peperoni; Oliv; Hongjoong; Mingi | Eden; Ollounder; Leez; Maddox; Peperoni; Oliv | Eden; Ollounder; Leez; Maddox; Peperoni; Oliv | 3:03 |
| 3. | "Cyberpunk" | Eden; Ollounder; Leez; Peperoni; Oliv; Hongjoong; Min-gi | Eden; Ollounder; Leez; Peperoni; Oliv | Eden; Ollounder; Leez; Peperoni; Oliv | 3:44 |
| 4. | "Guerrilla" | Eden; Ollounder; Leez; HLB; Hongjoong; Min-gi | Eden; Ollounder; Leez | Ollounder | 3:27 |
| 5. | "The Ring" | Eden; Ollounder; Leez; Buddy; Hongjoong; Mingi | Eden; Ollounder; Leez; Buddy | Eden; Ollounder; Leez; Buddy | 4:00 |
| 6. | "WDIG (Where Do I Go)" | Eden; Ollounder; Leez; Peperoni; Oliv; Hongjoong; Mingi; Dwayne; Neko | Eden; Ollounder; Leez; Peperoni; Oliv | Eden; Ollounder; Leez; Peperoni; Oliv | 3:13 |
| 7. | "New World" | Eden; Leez; Buddy; Hongjoong; Mingi; Dwayne; Neko | Eden; Leez; Buddy | Eden; Leez | 3:36 |
| Total length: | | | | | 22:20 |

== Charts ==
=== Weekly charts ===
Chart performance for The World EP.1: Movement
| Chart (2022) | Peak position |
|---|---|
| Australian Digital Albums (ARIA) | 15 |
| Australian Hitseekers Albums (ARIA) | 15 |
| Belgian Albums (Ultratop Flanders) | 21 |
| Belgian Albums (Ultratop Wallonia) | 41 |
| Croatian International Albums (HDU) | 10 |
| Finnish Albums (Suomen virallinen lista) | 6 |
| Hungarian Albums (MAHASZ) | 19 |
| Japanese Albums (Oricon) | 4 |
| Japanese Hot Albums (Billboard Japan) | 64 |
| Polish Albums (ZPAV) | 9 |
| South Korean Albums (Circle) | 1 |
| Swedish Physical Albums (Sverigetopplistan) | 5 |
| Swiss Albums (Schweizer Hitparade) | 87 |
| UK Album Downloads (Official Charts) | 19 |
| US Billboard 200 | 3 |
| US World Albums (Billboard) | 1 |

=== Monthly charts ===
Monthly chart performance for The World EP.1: Movement
| Chart (2022) | Peak position |
|---|---|
| Japanese Albums (Oricon) | 17 |
| South Korean Albums (Circle) | 4 |

=== Year-end charts ===
Year-end chart performance for The World EP.1: Movement
| Chart (2022) | Position |
|---|---|
| Japanese Albums (Oricon) | 96 |
| South Korean Albums (Circle) | 19 |
| US Top Album Sales (Billboard) | 94 |

== Accolades ==
Year-end lists
| Critic/Publication | List | Work | Rank | Ref. |
|---|---|---|---|---|
| Billboard | The 25 Best K-pop Albums of 2022 | The World EP.1: Movement | 9 | |
| Dazed | The Best K-pop Tracks of 2022 | "Guerrilla" | 3 | |
| NME | The 25 Best K-pop Songs of 2022 | "Cyberpunk" | 9 | |
| NME | The 25 Best K-pop Songs of 2022 | "Guerrilla" | 25 | |
| Paper | The Best K-pop B-sides of 2022 | "Cyberpunk" | 3 | |
| Rolling Stone India | The 10 Best Korean Music Videos of 2022 | "Guerrilla" | 3 | |

Music program awards
| Song | Program | Date | Ref. |
|---|---|---|---|
| "Guerrilla" | Music Bank (KBS) | August 5, 2022 | |
| "Guerrilla" | Music Bank (KBS) | August 12, 2022 | |
| "Guerrilla" | The Show (SBS M) | August 2, 2022 | |
| "Guerrilla" | The Show (SBS M) | August 9, 2022 | |
| "Guerrilla" | Show Champion (MBC M) | August 3, 2022 | |
| "Guerrilla" | Show Champion (MBC M) | August 10, 2022 | |

== Certifications and sales ==
Certifications and sales for The World EP.1: Movement
| Region | Certification | Certified units/sales |
|---|---|---|
| South Korea (KMCA) | Million | 1,002,031 |
