= Precious Imuwahen Ajoonu =

- Born: Nigeria
- Citizenship: Nigerian
- Occupations: Entrepreneur, Tech professional
- Known for: Contributions to entrepreneurship and technology initiatives

Precious Imuwahen Ajoonu (born Imuwahen Eronmwon Ogbomo 15 January 1985) is a Nigerian curriculum design expert and writer. She is the pioneer Director General of John Odigie-Oyegun Public Service Academy (JOOPSA) – an Edo State government institution for training of civil servants.

== Education and career ==
Precious Ajoonu attended Federal Government Girls College, Benin City finishing in 2000. She earned a bachelor's degree in economics from Madonna University, Okija and a master's degree in management, Innovation and Change from University of Aberdeen.

Ajoonu started her career after the mandatory one-year National Youth Service Corps in 2010 at her family's company - Transall Nigeria Limited and worked there until 2020 when she left to join Jobberman. At Jobberman she served as the head, Youth Engagement and Learning. During her tenure, she designed the Jobberman Soft Skills Training Curriculum. In 2021, she served as transformation director, Governor's Strategy team which plans Edo State executive council's programs. In 2023, Governor Godwin Obaseki appointed Ajoonu as the first director general of John Odigie-Oyegun Public Service Academy (JOOPSA) to train and retrain civil servants of the state. During her term, Ajoonu influenced enactment of the JOOPSA Act and formed strategic partnership with state governments in the South-South region - Bayelsa, Rivers, Akwa-Ibom, Cross River, Edo, and Delta known as BRACED Commission under the ‘Benin Declaration’ to train public and civil servants in the region. As of 2024, JOOPSA has trained over 20,000 public and civil servants in the South-South region.

In 2024, Ajoonu published her debut book, The Hero Inside: A Holistic Approach to Life Skills and Values-based Education.
