= Treasure EP.2: Zero to One =

- Digital cover

EP by Ateez
- Released: January 15, 2019
- Recorded: 2018
- Genre: K-pop
- Length: 17:51
- Language: Korean
- Label: KQ Entertainment

Ateez chronology
Treasure EP.1: All to Zero (2018)	Treasure EP.2: Zero to One (2019)	Treasure EP.3: One to All (2019)

Singles from Treasure EP.2: Zero to One
- 1. "Say My Name" Released: January 15, 2019; 2. "Hala Hala (Hearts Awakened, Live Alive)" Released: February 7, 2019

Treasure EP.2: Zero to One is the second extended play by South Korean boy band Ateez. It was released on January 15, 2019, with "Say My Name" serving as the album's lead single. It debuted and peaked at number six on the Gaon Album Chart.

== Track listing ==
No.	Title	Writer(s)	Producer(s)	Length
1.	"Hala Hala (Hearts Awakened, Live Alive)"	Eden, Buddy, Leez, HLB, Hongjoong, Mingi	Eden, Buddy, Leez	3:22
2.	"Say My Name"	Eden, Buddy, Leez, HLB, Hongjoong, Mingi	Eden, Buddy, Leez	3:42
3.	"Desire"	Eden, Buddy, Leez, HLB, Hongjoong, Mingi	Eden, Buddy, Leez	3:54
4.	"Light"	Eden, Buddy, Leez, HLB, Hongjoong, Mingi	Eden, Buddy, Leez	3:38
5.	"Promise"	Eden, Buddy, Leez, HLB, Hongjoong, Mingi	Eden, Buddy, Leez, Aroze	3:15
6.	"From" (CD only)	KQ Fellaz 1	Eden, Hongjoong, Leez	3:10
Total length:				21:10

== Charts ==
Weekly charts
Chart (2019)	Peak position
South Korean Albums (Gaon)	6
US Heatseekers Albums (Billboard)	7
US World Albums (Billboard)	5

Year-end charts
Chart (2019)	Position
South Korean Albums (Gaon)	77

== Accolades ==
Year-end lists
Critic/Publication	List	Song	Rank	Ref.
Billboard	The 25 Best K-pop Songs of 2019	"Say My Name"	13	
BuzzFeed	30 Songs That Helped Define K-Pop in 2019	"Say My Name"	4	
Refinery29	The Best K-Pop Songs of 2019	"Say My Name"	6	
Rolling Stone India	10 Best K-Pop Music Videos of 2019	"Say My Name"	—	
