= Precious Bedell =

American woman

Precious Bedell Murray (born 1954) is an American woman who was imprisoned for twenty years for murdering her two-year-old daughter, Lashonda Bedell. She has since worked as an activist to improve the lives of incarcerated people.

== Murder ==
=== Event ===
Lashonda Bedell was beaten in the restroom of a restaurant Nov. 7, 1979. She died four days later at a hospital. A doctor pronounced that her skull had been fractured in eight places.

=== Trial ===
Murray was convicted of second degree murder on October 31. The charge was later reduced to manslaughter after her defense attorney argued her conviction should be set aside due to legal errors. A judge allowed her to plead guilty to manslaughter and then be released based on her time already served. She was released in November 1999.

=== Incarceration ===
Murray was held at the Bedford Hills Correctional Facility in New York. During her imprisonment, Murray earned her GED, Bachelors and master's degrees.

== Activism ==
=== Awards ===
- 2016 Staff Community Service Award from the University of Rochester
- 2018 Warren J. Ferguson Scholarship from UMass Medical School

=== Career ===
Murray works as the Human subjects research coordinator in the Department of Psychiatry for the University of Rochester's Women's Initiative Supporting Health Transitions Clinic. Murray founded the Turning Points Resource Center, a nonprofit that supports the families of those incarcerated. She has been a guest speaker at the University of Rochester in their political science department. Murray is pursuing her doctorate degree at the University of Rochester.

=== Volunteer work ===
Murray volunteered on the "Ban the Box" campaign to prevent employer discrimination against those who have been formerly incarcerated. She also volunteers with the Monroe County Reentry Task Force, the Safer Monroe Re-Entry Team, Pillars of Hope, the Rochester Area Interfaith Hospitality Network, the African American Health Coalition of the Finger Lakes Health Systems Agency, and Facing Race Embracing Equality, and is on the planning committee of Big Brothers Big Sisters.

=== Publications ===
Murray publishes under the name Precious Bedell with academic groups about the importance of first-person language when discussing incarcerated individuals in academic publications.
