= Zero: Fever Part.1 =

- Digital cover

EP by Ateez
- Released: July 29, 2020
- Recorded: 2020
- Genre: K-pop
- Length: 22:21
- Language: Korean; English
- Label: KQ Entertainment

Ateez chronology
| Treasure EP.Map to Answer (2020) | Zero: Fever Part.1 (2020) | Zero: Fever Part.2 (2021) |

Singles from Zero: Fever Part 1
- 1. "Inception" Released: July 29, 2020; 2. "Thanxx" Released: August 24, 2020

Zero: Fever Part.1 is the fifth extended play (EP) by South Korean boy group Ateez. It was released on July 29, 2020, with "Inception" and "Thanxx" serving as lead singles. The physical album comes in three versions: Thanxx, Inception, and Diary. The album is composed of seven tracks, and incorporates different genres such as dance-pop, trap, hip hop, D&B, reggae, pop rock, and synth-pop.

Commercially, the album debuted atop the Gaon Album Chart, becoming Ateez's third number-one release in South Korea. It also charted on the US Billboard World Albums chart at number 6, with tracks "Inception" and "Thanxx" peaking at numbers 9 and 18, respectively, on the digital songs chart. Ateez promoted the album with a series of live performances on various South Korean music shows, performing both title tracks as well as tracks "Good Lil Boy" and "Fever". Music videos were also released for both "Inception" and "Thanxx," released on July 29 and August 24, respectively. The music videos are the two fastest Ateez music videos to reach 10,000,000 views on YouTube, each achieving the feat in less than 24 hours.

== Track listing ==
Zero: Fever Part.1 track listing
| No. | Title | Writer(s) | Producer(s) | Length |
|---|---|---|---|---|
| 1. | "Dear Diary: 2016.07.29" | Eden, James.S | Eden, Leez, Ollounder, Buddy | 2:33 |
| 2. | "Fever" | Eden, Leez, Ollounder, Buddy, Hongjoong, Mingi | Eden, Leez, Ollounder, Buddy | 3:24 |
| 3. | "Thanxx" | Eden, Ollounder, Leez, Buddy, Hongjoong, Mingi | Eden, Ollounder, Leez, Buddy | 3:01 |
| 4. | "To the Beat" | Eden, Buddy, Leez, Peperoni, Oliv, Hongjoong, Mingi | Eden, Buddy, Leez, Peperoni, Oliv | 3:02 |
| 5. | "Inception" | Eden, Leez, Ollounder, Buddy, Hongjoong, Mingi | Eden, Ollounder, Buddy, Leez | 3:31 |
| 6. | "Good Lil Boy" | Eden, Hongjoong, Leez, Ollounder, Mingi | Eden, Hongjoong, Leez, Ollounder | 3:26 |
| 7. | "One Day at a Time" | Eden, Sophia Pae, Isaac Han, Buddy, Leez, Peperoni, Oliv | Eden, Buddy, Leez, Peperoni, Oliv | 3:24 |
| Total length: | | | | 22:21 |

== Charts ==
Weekly charts
| Chart (2020–2025) | Peak position |
|---|---|
| Belgian Albums (Ultratop Flanders) | 41 |
| Belgian Albums (Ultratop Wallonia) | 92 |
| Croatia International Albums (HDU) | 26 |
| Hungarian Albums (MAHASZ) | 9 |
| Japanese Albums (Oricon) | 9 |
| Polish Albums (ZPAV) | 4 |
| South Korean Albums (Gaon) | 1 |
| US World Albums (Billboard) | 6 |

Year-end charts
| Chart (2020) | Position |
|---|---|
| South Korean Albums (Gaon) | 25 |

== Accolades ==
Awards and nominations
| Year | Organization | Award | Work | Result | Ref. |
|---|---|---|---|---|---|
| 2020 | Golden Disc Awards | Disc Bonsang | Zero: Fever Part.1 | Nominated | |
| 2020 | Gaon Chart Music Awards | Album of the Year – 3rd Quarter | Zero: Fever Part.1 | Nominated | |
| 2020 | Mnet Asian Music Awards | Song of the Year | "Inception" | Nominated | |
| 2020 | Mnet Asian Music Awards | Best Dance Performance – Male Group | "Inception" | Nominated | |

Year-end lists
| Critic/Publication | List | Work | Rank | Ref. |
|---|---|---|---|---|
| BuzzFeed | 35 Songs That Helped Define K-Pop In 2020 | "Inception" | 14 | |
| Teen Vogue | The Best K-Pop Moments of 2020 | Zero: Fever Part.1 'Diary Film' | Placed | |

Music program awards
| Song | Program | Date | Ref. |
|---|---|---|---|
| "Inception" | The Show (SBS MTV) | August 4, 2020 | |
| "Inception" | Show Champion (MBC M) | August 5, 2020 | |

== Certifications ==
Certifications for Zero: Fever Part.1
| Region | Certification | Certified units/sales |
|---|---|---|
| South Korea (KMCA) | Platinum | 250,000^{^} |
^{^} Shipments figures based on certification alone.

== See also ==
- List of 2020 albums
- List of Gaon Album Chart number ones of 2020
