= Treasure EP.1: All to Zero =

- Digital cover

EP by Ateez
- Released: October 24, 2018
- Recorded: 2018
- Genre: K-pop
- Length: 19:23
- Language: Korean
- Label: KQ Entertainment

Ateez chronology
Treasure EP.1: All to Zero (2018)	Treasure EP.2: Zero to One (2019)

Singles from Treasure EP.1: All to Zero
- 1. "Pirate King" Released: October 24, 2018; 2. "Treasure" Released: October 24, 2018

Treasure EP.1: All to Zero is the debut extended play by South Korean boy band Ateez. It was released on October 24, 2018, with "Pirate King" and "Treasure" serving as the album's singles. It reached number seven on the Gaon Album Chart and sold 57,777 copies in South Korea.

== Track listing ==
No.	Title	Writer(s)	Producer(s)	Length
1.	"Intro: Long Journey"	Eden, Buddy, Leez, Maddox	Eden, Buddy, Leez, Ahn Su-wan	1:36
2.	"Pirate King" (해적왕; Haejeog-wang)	Eden, Buddy, Leez, HLB, Hongjoong, Mingi	Eden, Buddy, Leez	3:15
3.	"Treasure"	Eden, Buddy, Leez, HLB, Hongjoong, Mingi	Eden, Buddy, Leez	3:40
4.	"Twilight"	Eden, Buddy, Leez, HLB, Hongjoong, Mingi	Eden, Buddy, Leez	3:44
5.	"Stay"	Eden, Buddy, Leez, HLB, Hongjoong, Mingi	Eden, Buddy, Leez	3:19
6.	"My Way"	Eden, Buddy, Leez, HLB, Hongjoong, Mingi	Eden, Buddy, Leez	3:48
Total length:				19:23

== Charts ==
Chart performance for Treasure EP.1: All to Zero
Chart (2018–2021)	Peak position
Belgian Albums (Ultratop Flanders)	153
Belgian Albums (Ultratop Wallonia)	175
Hungarian Albums (MAHASZ)	39
South Korean Albums (Gaon)	7
US World Albums (Billboard)	12
