= Treasure EP.Fin: All to Action =

- Digital cover

Studio album by Ateez
- Released: October 8, 2019
- Genre: K-pop
- Length: 30:45
- Language: Korean
- Label: KQ Entertainment
- Producer: Eden

Ateez chronology
Treasure EP.3: One to All (2019)	Treasure EP.Fin: All to Action (2019)	Treasure EP.Extra: Shift the Map (2019)

Singles from Treasure EP.Fin: All to Action
- 1. "Wonderland" Released: October 8, 2019

Treasure EP.Fin: All to Action is the first studio album by South Korean boy band Ateez. It was released through KQ Entertainment on October 8, 2019, alongside the single "Wonderland" and its music video. It also serves as the final part of the Treasure series. The album debuted atop the Gaon Album Chart. The single "Wonderland" was certified Gold in Brazil (Pro-Música Brasil) for selling over 20,000 units.

== Background and writing ==
The album was produced by Eden, who has produced much of the band's material. He also co-wrote most of the tracks with Buddy, Leez and Ollounder, the latter two of whom contributed to Treasure EP.3: One to All. Band members and rappers Hongjoong and Mingi co-wrote "Wonderland", with Hongjoong also partaking in the composition of "Sunrise". The song "Thank U" was also written by Hongjoong to express his gratitude towards fellow member Seonghwa.

== Track listing ==
No.	Title	Writer(s)	Producer(s)	Length
1.	"End of the Beginning"	Eden, Buddy, Leez, Hongjoong, Mingi	Eden, Leez, Buddy	0:29
2.	"Wonderland"	Eden, Leez, Buddy, Ollounder, Hongjoong, Mingi	Eden, Leez, Buddy, Ollounder	3:19
3.	"Dazzling Light"	Eden, Leez, Buddy, Ollounder, Hongjoong, Mingi	Eden, Leez, Buddy, Ollounder	3:09
4.	"Mist" (안개; Angae)	Eden, Leez, Buddy, Hongjoong, Mingi	Eden, Buddy, Leez	3:19
5.	"Precious (Overture)"	Eden, Ollounder, Hongjoong, Mingi	Eden, Ollounder	1:42
6.	"Win"	Eden, Leez, Buddy, Ollounder, Hongjoong, Mingi	Eden, Leez, Buddy, Ollounder	3:22
7.	"If Without You"	Eden, Leez, Buddy, Hongjoong, Mingi	Eden, Leez, Buddy	3:20
8.	"Thank U" (친구; Chingu [lit. "Friend"])	Eden, Leez, Ollounder, Hongjoong, Mingi	Eden, Leez, Ollounder	3:21
9.	"Sunrise"	Eden, Hongjoong, Leez, Buddy, Mingi	Eden, Hongjoong, Buddy, Leez	3:18
10.	"With U" (걸어가고 있어; Georeogago isseo [lit. "I'm Walking"])	Eden, Leez, Hongjoong, Mingi	Eden, Leez	3:34
11.	"Beginning of the End"		Eden, Leez, Buddy, Ollounder, Ahn Su-wan	1:52
Total length:				30:45

== Charts ==
Weekly charts
Chart (2019–2020)	Peak position
Australian Digital Albums (ARIA)	32
French Download Albums (SNEP)	53
Hungarian Albums (MAHASZ)	15
Polish Albums (ZPAV)	20
South Korean Albums (Gaon)	1
US Heatseekers Albums (Billboard)	10
US World Albums (Billboard)	7

Year-end charts
Chart (2019)	Position
South Korean Albums (Gaon)	35

== Accolades ==
Year-end lists
Critic/Publication	List	Rank	Ref.
PopCrush	Best Pop Albums of 2019	—N/a	

Awards and nominations
Year	Organization	Award	Work	Result	Ref.
2019	Golden Disc Awards	Disc Bonsang	Treasure EP.Fin: All to Action	Nominated	
