= Eden (Korean musician) =

South Korean musician (born 1988)

- Born: Kim Yong-hwan; July 12, 1988 (age 37); Yeonsu, South Korea
- Occupations: Singer-songwriter; record producer
- Years active: 2010–present
- Spouse: Unknown (m. 2023)
- Musical career
- Genres: Classical music; urban; K-pop
- Instruments: Vocals; piano; guitar
- Label: KQ Entertainment
- Member of: Eden-ary

Korean name
- Hangul: 김용환
- RR: Gim Yonghwan
- MR: Kim Yonghwan
- Website: KQ ENTERTAINMENT

Kim Yong-hwan (Korean: 김용환; born July 12, 1988), known professionally by his stage name Eden (이든; stylized in all caps), is a South Korean singer-songwriter and record producer. Under KQ Entertainment, he made his solo debut in 2017. He is most well known as the leader of Eden-ary, the production team for Ateez and Xikers.

His stage name references the Biblical garden because he has always wanted to make music in the most natural and basic way.

== Career ==
Eden played the piano from a young age, being inspired by musicians such as Frédéric Chopin and Sergei Rachmaninoff to pursue a career in music. He'd already mastered composing Classical music. He decided to become a singer and composer, and he moved to Seoul from his hometown Yeonsu for learning Popular music. He taught himself how to compose and produce it.

In 2010, a file of his music that he'd sent to his friend ended up in the hands of Source Music. He started as a composer in 2010, participating in SS501's Kim Hyung-jun' album My Girl. He joined a production team Eden Beatz with musician J.Rise, and released their album in 2012.

He joined the military and completed his service in 2013, and then left Source Music.

KQ Entertainment happened to reach out to him, and began to work with him. He lived in a studio at the company for the next two years and went on to be co-producers with Hyun-sik of BtoB and Woodz.

He made his own solo debut at the age of 29 with the single album Urban Hymns on February 17, 2017.

He is currently the primary producer for boy bands in his label, including Ateez, who made their debut on October 24, 2018, and Xikers, who made their debut on March 30, 2023.

== Record products ==
The following contents are based on official website.

=== Artists ===
Year	Group
2018–present	ATEEZ
2023–present	xikers

=== Songs ===
==== BtoB ====
2015	여기 있을게
2016	기도 I'll Be Your Man
2017	말만해
2017	그리워하다 Missing You
2018	너 없인 안 된다
2018	아름답고도 아프구나

==== Other artists ====
2011	Kim Hyung-jun	Heaven
2015	GFriend	Neverland
2016	Luizy feat. Hyun-sik of BtoB	Baby Ride
2016	Luizy	요즘 뭐 해 How Have You Been
2016	Chancellor	Venus
2017	LUCY feat. Kisum	B-DAY
2017	Seul-ong feat. Beenzino	너야
2018	Yuju feat. Suran	LOVE RAIN
2018	Wanna One	묻고 싶다 One Love
2018	Produce 48	Rumor
2020	Younha feat. RM	WINTER FLOWER（雪中梅）

== Discography ==
The following contents are based on official website.

=== Single albums ===
2017年	URBAN HYMNS	1. 그 땔 살아 I'm still feat. Kwon Jin-ah; 2. Stand Up feat. Babylon
2019年	Heaven	1. Heaven feat. Heize

=== EPs ===
2018年	RYU：川	1. 93; 2. Because You're Pretty; 3. Good Night feat. Jukjae）; 4. Dance feat. Woodz; 5. Little Bird
2019年	EXHALANT	1. 너무 사랑해서 사랑할 수 없어 Suffering for Love; 2. Killing Me Slowly; 3. 3Things feat. Maddox; 4. I'm Yours

=== Monthly Series ===
2018～2019年	STARDUST	1. Lazy Love EDEN×Younha; 2. MADNESS HLB×MRSHLL）; 3. attention EDEN×Jung-in）; 4. Drive Babylon×WOODZ）; 5. Lamp Maddox）; 6. FIREWORKS EDEN×LUCY）; 7. 미련 Shin Ji-soo; 8. Happy New Year My Lover EDEN; 9. DON'T MAKE ME WAIT LEEZ×BIBI SOM; 10. ROSE（EDEN×Alice of Hello Venus; 11. AGAIN EDEN×Sophiya; 12. Painful EDEN×Blah

2020～2021年	STARDUST 2	1. SOON EDEN×Samuel Seo; 2. THE SUN DINDIN; 3. FALL IN LUST EDEN×Jiselle; 4. Why Don't We EDEN×XQ; 5. Luv'ae (Love You Babe) EDEN×Horim; 6. Paranoid EDEN×LEEZ; 7. Call Me Anytime EDEN×ATEEZ×Maddox×Eden-ary; 8. TELL ME BYE EDEN×Moah; 9. DIVE EDEN×HLB; 10. Hold Me EDEN; 11. 날 떠나 EDEN×Youngjun of Brown Eyed Soul; 12. Dancing in the Moonlight EDEN

=== Eden Beatz ===
2012年	Eden Beatz	1. Running feat. Joo Hee of 8eight 2. 푹 숙이고 feat. Fly; 3. Don't Worry; 4. Running Inst.; 5. 푹 숙이고 Inst.
2013年	For Your All Kinds Of Night	1. Venus feat. Mikey of Duble Sidekick
2015年	For Your All Kinds Of Night Part 2	1. 플레이그라운드 feat. Hyun-sik of BTOB

=== OST ===
2018年	tvN	식샤를 합시다3 비긴즈	궁금해

=== etc. ===
2018年	Hidden Track No.V	1. Shall I Stay EDEN; 2. I'm Your Puppy Summer Soul

== See also ==
- Ateez
- Xikers
