= Billboard K-Pop Artist 100 =

K-pop artist ranking by Billboard

The Billboard K-Pop Artist 100 is a ranking of 100 K-pop artists compiled by Billboard and Billboard Korea. Introduced in 2024, the inaugural edition ranked artists based on activity on the Billboard 200, Billboard Hot 100 and Billboard Boxscore for charts dated January 7 through December 30, 2023. The 2025 edition covered artists' achievements from October 2024 through September 2025 and expanded the methodology to include the Billboard Global 200, global touring data, and streaming and song-sales activity in South Korea, alongside the Billboard 200 and Hot 100.

== History and methodology ==
In January 2024, Billboard announced the establishment of Billboard Korea in partnership with Global Entertainment Media Group.

=== 2024 ===
The inaugural K-Pop Artist 100 was published on February 27, 2024, during the rollout of Billboard Korea. Billboard described it as its inaugural K-Pop Artist 100 list, while contemporary coverage reported that it was compiled by the chart teams of Billboard and Billboard Korea.

Rankings were based on activity on the Billboard 200 albums chart, Billboard Hot 100 songs chart and Billboard Boxscore touring data for charts dated January 7 through December 30, 2023. Group members were generally listed together, except where notable solo activity resulted in an artist being ranked separately. Billboard Korea officially launched on August 27, 2024, at the Billboard K Power 100 event in Seoul; Billboard later described the K-Pop Artist 100 as a ranking project based on Billboard 200, Hot 100 and Boxscore activity.

=== 2025 ===
The K-Pop Artist 100 returned on December 23, 2025. Billboard Korea compiled the second edition in partnership with Billboard, based on each artist's achievements from October 2024 through September 2025.

The methodology incorporated the U.S.-based Billboard Hot 100 and Billboard 200, the internationally focused Billboard Global 200, global Billboard Boxscore touring data, and streaming and song-sales activity in South Korea. Luminate supplied the streaming and sales data used for the ranking, excluding Billboard Boxscore. Group members were sometimes listed together, except where notable solo or unit activity separated individual artists. Member order generally followed official agency listings, with members on hiatus for military service placed toward the bottom.

== Rankings ==
=== 2024 ===
2024 Billboard K-Pop Artist 100
Rank	Artist	Associated group
1	Jungkook	BTS
2	Bang Chan	Stray Kids
3	Lee Know	Stray Kids
4	Changbin	Stray Kids
5	Hyunjin	Stray Kids
6	Han	Stray Kids
7	Felix	Stray Kids
8	Seungmin	Stray Kids
9	I.N	Stray Kids
10	Fifty Fifty	—N/a
11	Minji	NewJeans
12	Hanni	NewJeans
13	Danielle	NewJeans
14	Haerin	NewJeans
15	Hyein	NewJeans
16	Yeonjun	Tomorrow X Together
17	Soobin	Tomorrow X Together
18	Beomgyu	Tomorrow X Together
19	Taehyun	Tomorrow X Together
20	HueningKai	Tomorrow X Together
21	Jimin	BTS
22	S.Coups	Seventeen
23	Wonwoo	Seventeen
24	Mingyu	Seventeen
25	Vernon	Seventeen
26	Woozi	Seventeen
27	Jeonghan	Seventeen
28	Joshua	Seventeen
29	DK	Seventeen
30	Seungkwan	Seventeen
31	Hoshi	Seventeen
32	Jun	Seventeen
33	The8	Seventeen
34	Dino	Seventeen
35	Hongjoong	Ateez
36	Seonghwa	Ateez
37	Yunho	Ateez
38	Yeosang	Ateez
39	San	Ateez
40	Mingi	Ateez
41	Wooyoung	Ateez
42	Jongho	Ateez
43	Heeseung	Enhypen
44	Jay	Enhypen
45	Jake	Enhypen
46	Sunghoon	Enhypen
47	Sunoo	Enhypen
48	Jungwon	Enhypen
49	Ni-ki	Enhypen
50	Jihyo	Twice
51	Nayeon	Twice
52	Jeongyeon	Twice
53	Momo	Twice
54	Sana	Twice
55	Mina	Twice
56	Dahyun	Twice
57	Chaeyoung	Twice
58	Tzuyu	Twice
59	Agust D	BTS
60	V	BTS
61	RM	BTS
62	J-Hope	BTS
63	Jin	BTS
64	Jennie	Blackpink
65	Rosé	Blackpink
66	Lisa	Blackpink
67	Jisoo	Blackpink
68	Kim Chaewon	Le Sserafim
69	Sakura	Le Sserafim
70	Huh Yunjin	Le Sserafim
71	Kazuha	Le Sserafim
72	Hong Eunchae	Le Sserafim
73	Karina	Aespa
74	Giselle	Aespa
75	Winter	Aespa
76	Ningning	Aespa
77	Taeil	NCT 127
78	Johnny	NCT 127
79	Taeyong	NCT 127
80	Yuta	NCT 127
81	Doyoung	NCT 127
82	Jaehyun	NCT 127
83	Jungwoo	NCT 127
84	Mark	NCT 127 / NCT Dream
85	Haechan	NCT 127 / NCT Dream
86	Renjun	NCT Dream
87	Jeno	NCT Dream
88	Chenle	NCT Dream
89	Jaemin	NCT Dream
90	Jisung	NCT Dream
91	Miyeon	I-dle
92	Minnie	I-dle
93	Soyeon	I-dle
94	Yuqi	I-dle
95	Shuhua	I-dle
96	Yeji	Itzy
97	Lia	Itzy
98	Ryujin	Itzy
99	Chaeryeong	Itzy
100	Yuna	Itzy

=== 2025 ===
For the second edition, Billboard Korea stated that the "No. 1 spot" went to Seventeen and its thirteen members, citing their consistent performance in the U.S., global and South Korean markets.

2025 Billboard K-Pop Artist 100
Rank	Artist	Associated group
1	S.Coups	Seventeen
2	Joshua	Seventeen
3	Jun	Seventeen
4	Hoshi	Seventeen
5	Woozi	Seventeen
6	Mingyu	Seventeen
7	DK	Seventeen
8	The8	Seventeen
9	Seungkwan	Seventeen
10	Vernon	Seventeen
11	Dino	Seventeen
12	Jeonghan	Seventeen
13	Wonwoo	Seventeen
14	Rosé	Blackpink
15	Yeonjun	Tomorrow X Together
16	Soobin	Tomorrow X Together
17	Beomgyu	Tomorrow X Together
18	Taehyun	Tomorrow X Together
19	HueningKai	Tomorrow X Together
20	Jin	BTS
21	Nayeon	Twice
22	Chaeyoung	Twice
23	Jeongyeon	Twice
24	Jihyo	Twice
25	Tzuyu	Twice
26	Momo	Twice
27	Sana	Twice
28	Mina	Twice
29	Dahyun	Twice
30	Bang Chan	Stray Kids
31	Lee Know	Stray Kids
32	Changbin	Stray Kids
33	Hyunjin	Stray Kids
34	Han	Stray Kids
35	Felix	Stray Kids
36	Seungmin	Stray Kids
37	I.N	Stray Kids
38	Jennie	Blackpink
39	Jungwon	Enhypen
40	Heeseung	Enhypen
41	Jay	Enhypen
42	Jake	Enhypen
43	Sunghoon	Enhypen
44	Sunoo	Enhypen
45	Ni-ki	Enhypen
46	Jimin	BTS
47	Hongjoong	Ateez
48	Seonghwa	Ateez
49	Yunho	Ateez
50	Yeosang	Ateez
51	San	Ateez
52	Mingi	Ateez
53	Jung Wooyoung	Ateez
54	Jongho	Ateez
55	HUNTR/X	—N/a
56	Karina	Aespa
57	Winter	Aespa
58	Giselle	Aespa
59	Ningning	Aespa
60	Kim Chaewon	Le Sserafim
61	Sakura	Le Sserafim
62	Huh Yunjin	Le Sserafim
63	Kazuha	Le Sserafim
64	Hong Eunchae	Le Sserafim
65	Jungkook	BTS
66	An Yu-jin	Ive
67	Gaeul	Ive
68	Rei	Ive
69	Wooyoung	Ive
70	Liz	Ive
71	Leeseo	Ive
72	IU	—N/a
73	Saja Boys	—N/a
74	Mark	NCT 127 / NCT Dream
75	Haechan	NCT 127 / NCT Dream
76	Renjun	NCT Dream
77	Jeno	NCT Dream
78	Jaemin	NCT Dream
79	Chenle	NCT Dream
80	Jisung	NCT Dream
81	NewJeans	—N/a
82	J-Hope	BTS
83	Yunah	Illit
84	Minju	Illit
85	Moka	Illit
86	Wonhee	Illit
87	Iroha	Illit
88	Lisa	Blackpink
89	V	BTS
90	Miyeon	I-dle
91	Minnie	I-dle
92	Soyeon	I-dle
93	Yuqi	I-dle
94	Shuhua	I-dle
95	BoyNextDoor	—N/a
96	Katseye	—N/a
97	P1Harmony	—N/a
98	G-Dragon	BigBang
99	RM	BTS
100	Day6	—N/a

== See also ==
- Billboard charts
- List of K-pop on the Billboard charts
- List of K-pop on the Billboard year-end charts
- Timeline of K-pop at Billboard
- Billboard Korea Hot 100
