= KPopped =

2025 music reality competition TV series

- Genre: Music competition
- Directed by: Yeonkyu Lee
- Presented by: Soojeong Son
- Starring: Psy; Megan Thee Stallion
- Countries of origin: Australia; South Korea; United States
- Original languages: English; Korean
- No. of seasons: 1
- No. of episodes: 8

Production
- Executive producers: Miky Lee; Harry H.K. Shin; Jake Hong; Lionel Richie; Bruce Eskowitz; Megan Thee Stallion; Chris Culvenor; Paul Franklin; Wes Dening; David Tibballs; Moira Ross; Greg Foster
- Cinematography: Hyung Ho Han; Kichul Kim; Ben Fogarty; Andrew Zeiderman; Jangsoo Jung; Chanhong Kim
- Running time: 32 minutes
- Production companies: CJ ENM; Eureka Productions; RichLion Productions

Original release
- Network: Apple TV+
- Release: August 29, 2025

KPopped (stylized in all caps) is a music reality competition television series that premiered on Apple TV+ on August 29, 2025. Produced by CJ ENM and Eureka Productions, the series pairs Western recording artists with K-pop idols to reimagine the artists' most popular songs in a K-pop style. Each episode culminates in head-to-head song battles judged by a live audience in Seoul. The show stars Psy and Megan Thee Stallion and is hosted by Soojeong Son. Stallion additionally serves as an executive producer alongside Lionel Richie and Miky Lee.

== Format ==
Established K-pop groups are divided into two subunits, each paired with a Western solo artist to reinterpret one of the guest's songs. In cases where acts like Boyz II Men are featured, the show skips having two guest artists, and each group performs twice—once with each subunit. Artists have 48 hours to rehearse before performing live for a studio audience, who then vote for the winning performance.

The series also features brief cultural exchanges, such as the members of Billlie introducing Megan Thee Stallion to spicy Buldak Ramen and Ateez joining Kylie Minogue to learn the traditional Buchaechum dance.

== Production ==
Apple TV+ announced the series on February 5, 2025. It premiered on August 29, 2025. The soundtrack was released in two installments by Sony Music Masterworks: the first volume, containing seven songs from the series, arrived on September 5, 2025, followed by the complete album on September 19, 2025.

== Reception ==
Hannah J Davies of The Guardian gave the series three out of five stars, describing it as "harmless but largely vibeless" and "a fairly blatant attempt to cash in on the ubiquity of K-pop." She also noted that it lacked the tension and unpredictability typically associated with music competition shows.

== Episodes ==
Note: Winners are listed in bold.

No. overall	No. in season	Title	Original release date
81	1	Megan Thee Stallion. Patti LaBelle. Billlie.	August 29, 2025
**Megan Thee Stallion** with **Moon Sua**, **Sheon** and **Siyoon** of Billlie: "Savage" Patti LaBelle with Suhyeon, Haram, Tsuki and Haruna of Billlie: "Lady Marmalade" Special performance: "Flipping a Coin" performed by Billlie, Megan Thee Stallion and Patti LaBelle
82	2	Spice Girls (Emma & Mel B). Itzy.	August 29, 2025
**Spice Girls** with **Lia** and **Yuna** of Itzy: "Say You'll Be There" Spice Girls with Ryujin, Yeji and Chaeryeong of Itzy: "Wannabe" Special performance: "Gold" performed by Itzy and Spice Girls
83	3	Vanilla Ice. Taylor Dayne. Kep1er.	August 29, 2025
**Vanilla Ice** with **Dayeon** and **Hikaru** of Kep1er: "Ice Ice Baby" Taylor Dayne with Chaehyun, Youngeun, Yujin, Huening Bahiyyih and Xiaoting of Kep1er: "Tell It to My Heart" Special performance: "Wa Da Da" performed by Kep1er, Vanilla Ice and Taylor Dayne
84	4	Eve. Kesha. JO1.	August 29, 2025
Eve with Takumi Kawanishi, Sho Yonashiro, Sky, Keigo Sato, Shion Tsurubo and Ruki Shiroiwa of JO1: "Let Me Blow Ya Mind" **Kesha** with **Junki Kono**, **Ren Kawashiri**, **Mamehara Issei**, **Shosei Ohira** and **Syoya Kimata** of JO1: "Joyride" Special performance: "Love Seeker" performed by JO1, Eve and Kesha
85	5	Kylie Minogue. J Balvin. Ateez.	August 29, 2025
Kylie Minogue with Jongho, Yunho, Wooyoung and Seonghwa of Ateez: "Can't Get You Out of My Head" **J Balvin** with **Yeosang**, **San**, **Hongjoong** and **Mingi** of Ateez: "Mi Gente" Special performance: "Bouncy (K-Hot Chilli Peppers)" performed by Ateez, Kylie Minogue and J Balvin
86	6	Boy George. TLC. STAYC.	August 29, 2025
Boy George with Sieun, Yoon and Sumin of STAYC: "Karma Chameleon" **TLC** with **Seeun**, **Isa** and **J** of STAYC: "Waterfalls" Special performance: "Run2U" performed by STAYC, TLC and Boy George
87	7	Ava Max. Jess Glynne. Kiss of Life.	August 29, 2025
**Ava Max** with **Belle** and **Natty** of Kiss of Life: "Kings & Queens" Jess Glynne with Haneul and Julie of Kiss of Life: "Hold My Hand" Special performance: "Get Loud" performed by Kiss of Life, Ava Max and Jess Glynne
88	8	Boyz II Men. Blackswan.	August 29, 2025
**Boyz II Men** with **Fatou**, **Gabi** and **Sriya** of Blackswan: "Motownphilly" Boyz II Men with NVee of Blackswan: "End of the Road" Special performance: "Roll Up" performed by Blackswan and Boyz II Men
