= 2022 Chuseok Idol Star Championships =

- Also known as: 2022 Idol Star Athletics Championships Chuseok Special
- Genre: Sports; Variety show
- Written by: Yoon Si-yoon; Yang Ye-jin; Um Yoon-jung; Kim So-hee; Hong Sung-hye; Lee Jung-hye; Baek Kyung-won
- Directed by: Oh Mi-kyung
- Presented by: Jun Hyun-moo; Lee Hong-gi; Dahyun
- Country of origin: South Korea
- Original language: Korean
- No. of episodes: 3

Production
- Executive producer: Jung Yoon-jung
- Production locations: Goyang Gymnasium; Jungangro 1601, Ilsanseo-gu, Goyang, Gyeonggi-do
- Running time: 145 minutes

Original release
- Network: MBC
- Release: September 9 – September 12, 2022

The 2022 Idol Star Athletics Championships Chuseok Special (Korean: 2022 추석특집 아이돌스타 육상 선수권 대회) was held at Goyang Gymnasium in Goyang, South Korea on July 30 and August 1, 2022, and was broadcast on MBC on September 9, 11, and 12, 2022 for three episodes.

== Synopsis ==
The show is revived after two years of hiatus caused by COVID-19 pandemic. In this year's chuseok Idol Star Athletics Championships, MZ generation K-pop idols compete in five sport events: archery, athletics, futsal, e-sport, which were already held in previous years, and a newly introduced dancesport.

The teams are divided into white and blue teams. Each win from each sports competition earns a team point.

== Cast ==
=== Presenters ===
Jun Hyun-moo, F.T. Island's Lee Hong-gi and Twice's Dahyun were the main hosts of the show. Dancer Aiki from Street Woman Fighter fame was named as special MC for dancesport segment.

=== Participants ===
==== Male ====
Group

- NCT
- Stray Kids
- The Boyz
- ATEEZ
- CIX
- AB6IX
- Epex
- Oneus
- Verivery
- DKZ
- WEi
- Xdinary Heroes
- MCND
- Drippin
- Tempest
- TNX
- P1Harmony
- N.Flying
- The KingDom
- TAN
- TO1
- DKB
- Younite
- ATBO

Soloist

- Woodz (Cho Seung-youn)
- Ha Sung-woon
- Kim Jae-hwan
- Jeong Se-woon
- Kim Woo-seok
- Lee Jin-hyuk

==== Female ====
Group

- Ive
- Itzy
- STAYC
- Nmixx
- Everglow
- Kep1er
- Brave Girls
- Weeekly
- Bvndit
- Lightsum
- Billlie
- Purple Kiss
- Alice
- Class:y
- Rocket Punch
- Cherry Bullet
- Tri.be
- Ichillin'
- H1-Key
- Lapillus

Soloist

- Kwon Eun-bi
- Choi Ye-na
- Jo Yu-ri
- Hynn (Park Hye-won)

== Results ==
=== Men ===
Archery

Event	Gold	Silver	Bronze
Men's team	NCT; Jungwoo, Shotaro, Sungchan	ATEEZ; Yeosang, Yunho, Jongho	Not awarded

Dancesport

Event	Gold	Silver	Bronze
Men	Intak (P1Harmony)	Kim Dong-han (WEi)	Not awarded

Athletics

Event	Gold	Silver	Bronze
60 m	Wooyoung (ATEEZ)	Not awarded	Not awarded
4 × 100 m	ATEEZ; Wooyoung, Hongjoong, Jongho, Seonghwa	Not awarded	Not awarded

Futsal

Event	Gold
Winning team	Kim Jae-hwan (C), Ha Sung-woon, Taehoon (TAN), D1 (DKB), Louis (KINGDOM), Minjae (MCND), Dongyun (DRIPPIN), Kyoungyoon (DKZ)
MVP	Kim Jae-hwan

=== Women ===
Archery

Event	Gold	Silver	Bronze
Women's team	Brave Girls; Minyoung, Eunji, Yuna	Solo Union; Hynn, Jo Yu-ri, Choi Ye-na	Not awarded

Dancesport

Event	Gold	Silver	Bronze
Women	Xiaoting (Kep1er)	Tsuki (Billlie)	Not awarded

Athletics

Event	Gold	Silver	Bronze
60 m	May (Cherry Bullet)	Not awarded	Na Goeun (Purple Kiss)
4 × 100 m	Weeekly; Zoa, Park So-eun, Lee Soo-jin, Monday	Not awarded	Not awarded

=== Mixed ===
E-sports

Event	Gold
PUBG Solo	LEW (TEMPEST)
PUBG Duo	MCND (BIC and Huijun)
PUBG Squad	YOUNITE

== Ratings ==
Episode #	Original broadcast date	AGB Nielsen Ratings
Episode #	Original broadcast date	Nationwide
1	September 9, 2022	2.8%
2	September 11, 2022	1.2%
3	September 12, 2022	3.9%
