= Yeosang =

South Korean singer (born 1999)

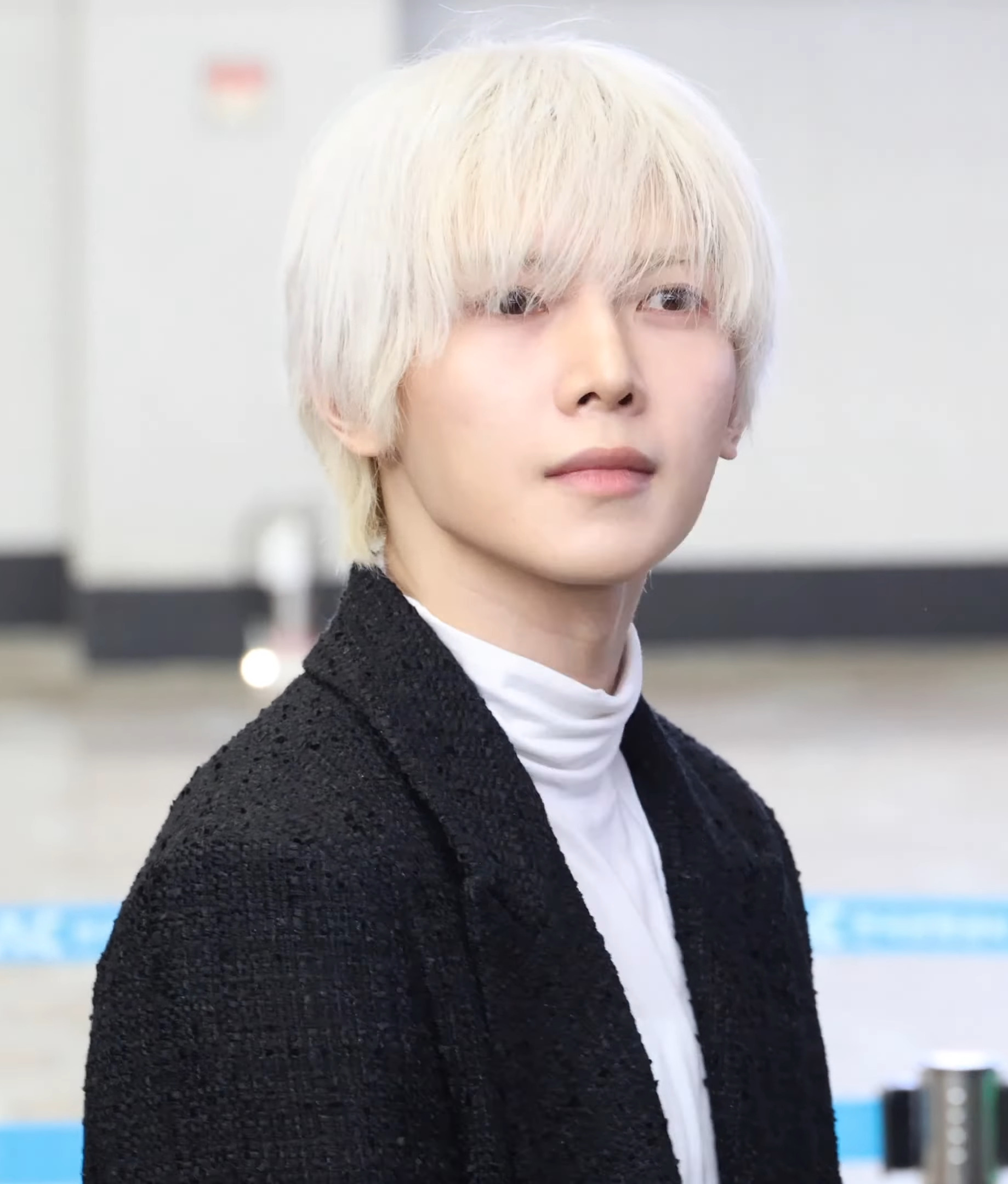
- Yeosang in 2025
- Born: Kang Yeo-sang; June 15, 1999 (age 27); Pohang, South Korea
- Education: Incheon POSCO High School
- Occupations: Singer; dancer
- Years active: 2018–present
- Musical career
- Genre: K-pop
- Instrument: Vocals
- Label: KQ
- Member of: Ateez

Korean name
- Hangul: 강여상
- RR: Gang Yeosang
- MR: Kang Yŏsang

Kang Yeo-sang (Korean: 강여상; born June 15, 1999), known mononymously as Yeosang, is a South Korean singer and dancer. He debuted as a member of the South Korean boy band Ateez in October 2018, formed by KQ Entertainment. Outside of his group activities, he served as a host of the music program The Show from 2021 to 2024, and released the solo track "Legacy" in 2025.

== Early life ==
Kang was born on June 15, 1999, in Pohang, South Korea. Shortly after his birth, his family moved to Gwangju, where he spent his early childhood. He later lived in Incheon, including the Songdo area. As a child, he visited the Gwangju Biennale with his cousins. He attended Incheon POSCO High School. He became a trainee at Big Hit Entertainment during his first year of high school, where he met future bandmate Jung Wooyoung. He later joined KQ Entertainment.

== Career ==
=== 2018–present: Debut with Ateez ===
Kang debuted as a member of Ateez on October 24, 2018, with the release of the group's first extended play, Treasure EP.1: All to Zero.

=== 2021–2024: The Show ===
In February 2021, Kang was announced as a new co-host of SBS MTV's music program The Show, alongside Kim Yo-han of WEi and Jihan of Weeekly. He hosted until December 2021, when he departed alongside his co-hosts. He returned for a second season beginning in January 2022, and was renewed for a third consecutive year in March 2023. In March 2024, after approximately three years as a fixed host, Kang departed The Show. He made a one-time return as a special host in June 2024, appearing alongside bandmate Wooyoung.

=== 2023–present: Solo activities and songwriting ===
Kang has received writing credits for "From" (2019) and "It's You" (2023), a unit track with San and Wooyoung on the EP The World EP.Fin: Will. In 2025, he released "Legacy", a solo track he wrote for the deluxe edition of Ateez's EP Golden Hour: Part.3; it debuted at number nine on the Billboard World Digital Song Sales chart. In February 2025, he was the subject of an episode of the BS-TBS documentary series Ateez 8 FACE, which focused on his childhood and path to debut. In November 2025, he appeared as a solo guest on the BS-TBS food program Ramen wo Taberu. In November 2024, he performed the ceremonial opening toss before a Bucheon Hana Bank women's professional basketball game, and in May 2026, he threw the ceremonial first pitch before an LG Twins baseball game at Jamsil Baseball Stadium.

== Other ventures ==
=== Fashion ===
In August 2023, Kang appeared on the cover of Cosmopolitan Korea as part of a group feature. In April 2025, he participated in his first solo magazine photoshoot and interview for Esquire Korea.

== Discography ==
For Yeosang's work with Ateez, see Ateez discography.

=== Unofficial releases ===
List of unofficial releases, showing year released and album name
| Title | Year | Peak chart position | Album |
|---|---|---|---|
| "Legacy" | 2025 | 9 (Note: Peak position on the Billboard World Digital Song Sales chart.) | Golden Hour: Part.3 'In Your Fantasy Edition' |

== Filmography ==
=== Television shows ===
List of television appearances, showing year, title, role, and notes
| Year | Title | Role | Notes | Ref. |
|---|---|---|---|---|
| 2025 | Ateez 8 FACE ~YEOSANG~ | Himself | Documentary episode | |
| 2025 | Ramen wo Taberu | Himself | Guest appearance | |

=== Host ===
List of hosting appearances, showing year, title, and notes
| Year | Title | Notes | Ref. |
|---|---|---|---|
| 2021 | The Show | Co-host | |
| 2022 – March 2024 | The Show | Co-host; renewed for multiple seasons | |
| June 2024 | The Show | Special host | |

== Composition credits ==
All song credits are adapted from the Korea Music Copyright Association's database unless stated otherwise.

List of songs credited to Kang, showing year, artist, song, album, and credit type
| Year | Artist | Song | Album | Lyrics | Music |
|---|---|---|---|---|---|
| 2019 | Ateez | "From" | Non-album single | Yes | No |
| 2023 | San, Wooyoung and Yeosang | "It's You" | The World EP.Fin: Will | Yes | No |
| 2025 | Yeosang | "Legacy" | Golden Hour: Part.3 'In Your Fantasy Edition' | Yes | No |
