= Haerin =

South Korean singer (born 2006)

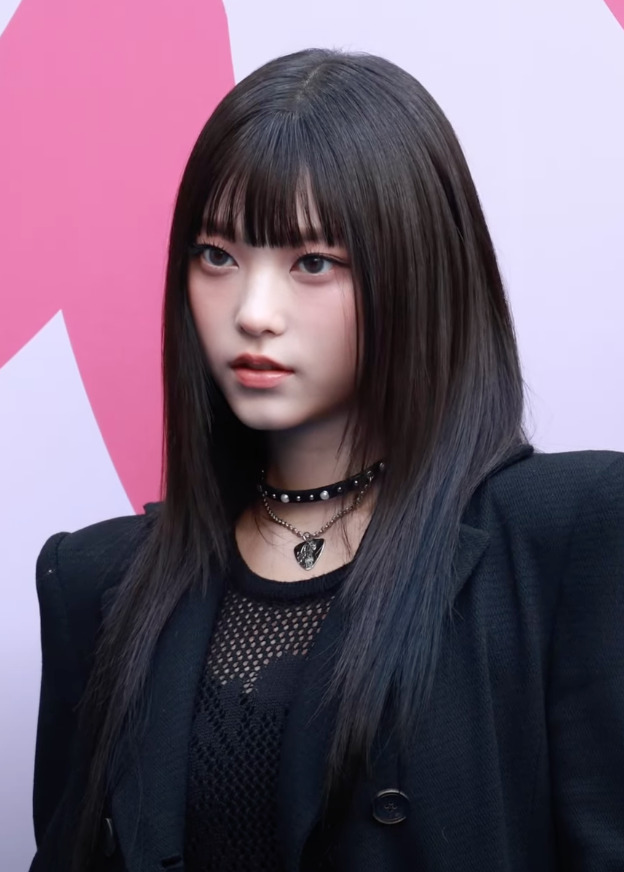
- Haerin in 2024
- Born: Kang Hae-rin; May 15, 2006 (age 20); Seoul, South Korea
- Occupation: Singer
- Musical career
- Genre: K-pop
- Instrument: Vocals
- Years active: 2022–present
- Label: ADOR
- Member of: NewJeans

Korean name
- Hangul: 강해린
- RR: Gang Haerin
- MR: Kang Haerin

Kang Hae-rin (Korean: 강해린; born May 15, 2006), known mononymously as Haerin, is a South Korean singer. She is best known as a member of the South Korean girl group NewJeans, which debuted on July 22, 2022, under the record label ADOR.

== Early life and education ==
Kang Hae-rin was born on May 15, 2006, in Seoul, South Korea. Her family consists of her parents and a younger sister, born three years apart. She initially attended Seoul Boramae Elementary School before transferring to Kwiin Elementary School. She attended Pyeongchon Middle School before dropping out, although she later passed the middle school and high school qualification exams to obtain a GED equivalent certificate. She was a trainee at another agency before officially joining Source Music in early 2020.

== Career ==
=== 2022–present: Debut with NewJeans and solo activities ===
On July 1, 2022, ADOR teased the launch of their first girl group, NewJeans, by posting three animated featuring the numbers "22", "7", and "22" on their social media accounts, fueling speculation that content would be released on July 22. Haerin debuted alongside the group with the surprise-released music video for their debut single "Attention" on July 22, 2022, without any prior promotion or information regarding the group's members. On July 21, 2023, NewJeans released their second extended play, Get Up, in which Haerin was credited for the first time as a lyricist for her contribution to the song "New Jeans".

On June 2, 2024, Haerin debuted as a special MC for SBS' K-Wave Concert Inkigayo held at the Inspire Arena in Incheon, South Korea, alongside Yunho and Han Yu-jin of boy groups Ateez and Zerobaseone, respectively.

== Public image ==
Following her debut, Haerin quickly went viral in South Korea and abroad for her distinctive facial features, reminiscent of a cat, which have become a defining characteristic of her persona. The Times of India noted that "as NewJeans breaks barriers and re-defines standards, Haerin stands at the forefront, a beacon of talent and style".

== Other ventures ==
=== Endorsements ===
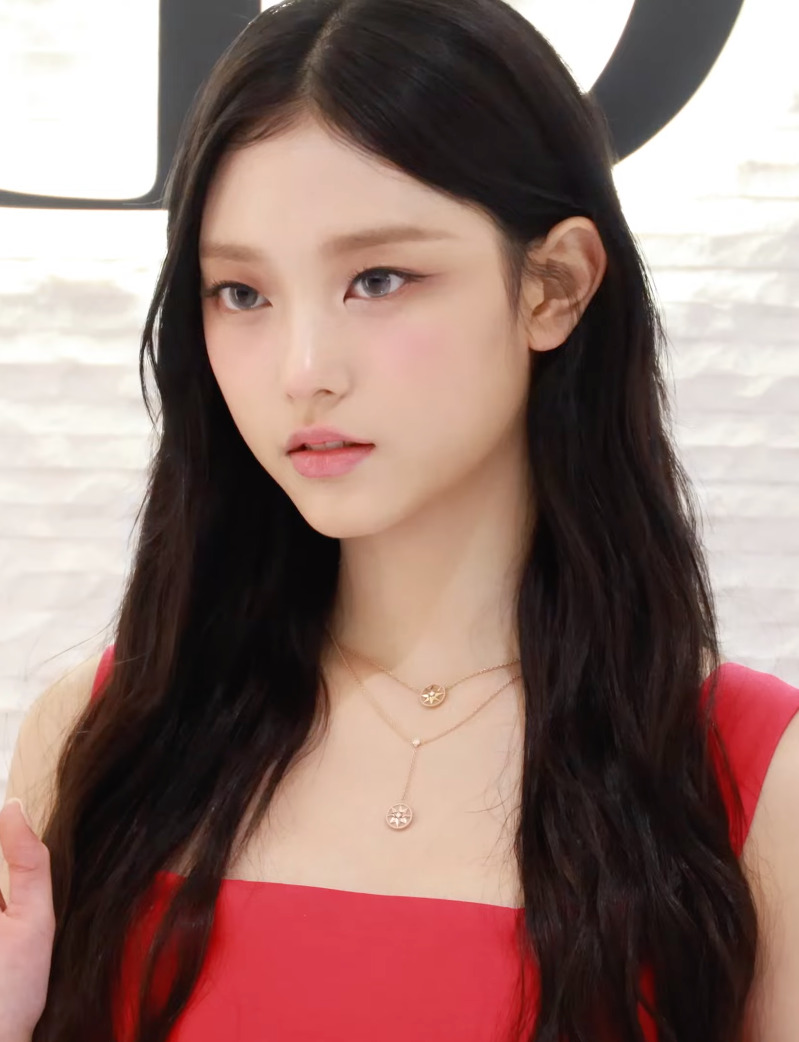
Haerin for Dior at the Pangyo Hyundai Department Store, December 2023

On April 26, 2023, Haerin was appointed by Dior as a global ambassador in jewellery and house ambassador in beauty and fashion. She is the first K-pop artist to be simultaneously named ambassador for all three categories.

She has attended several events for Dior, including the brand's women's boutique event held at the Hyundai Department Store in Pangyo, Paris Fashion Week, and the brand's Fall Fashion Show, held at the Brooklyn Museum, on April 16, 2024.

In May 2024, she starred in Dior's Denim Oblique Jacquard campaign, developed by its creative director Maria Grazia Chiuri. Haerin has also graced the covers of several fashion magazines, including Vogue Hong Kong, W Korea, and Harper's Bazaar Korea.

== Discography ==
=== Songwriting credits ===
All song credits are adapted from the Korea Music Copyright Association's database unless stated otherwise.

List of songs, showing year of release, artist's name and album name
Year	Artist	Song	Album	Lyricist	
Year	Artist	Song	Album	Credited	With
2023	NewJeans	"New Jeans"	Get Up	Yes	Gigi, Erika de Casier, Fine Glindvad Jensen, Park Jin-su & Frank Scoca

== Filmography ==
=== Hosting ===
Year	Title	Notes	Ref.
2024	K-Wave Concert Inkigayo	with Yunho of Ateez and Han Yu-jin of Zerobaseone	
