= Seonghwa =

South Korean singer and actor (born 1998)

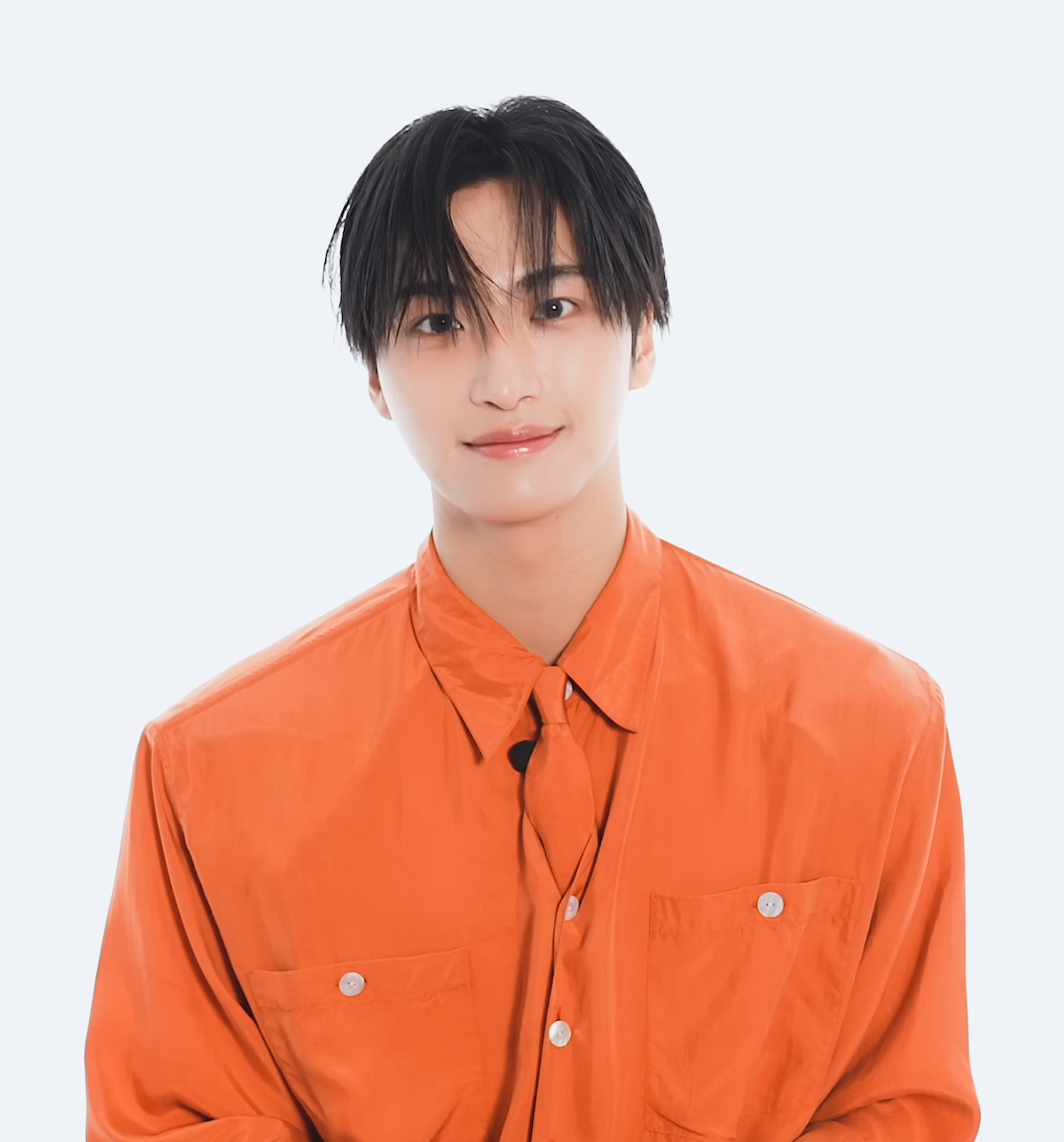
- Seonghwa in 2026
- Born: Park Seong-hwa; April 3, 1998 (age 28); Jinju, South Korea
- Occupations: Singer; model; actor
- Musical career
- Genres: K-pop
- Instrument: Vocals
- Years active: 2018–present
- Label: KQ
- Member of: Ateez

Korean name
- Hangul: 박성화
- RR: Bak Seonghwa
- MR: Pak Sŏnghwa

Signature
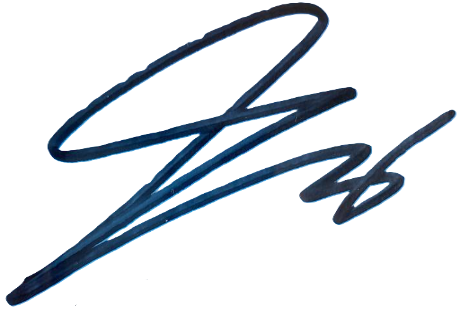

Park Seong-hwa (Korean: 박성화; born April 3, 1998), known mononymously as Seonghwa, is a South Korean singer, model, and actor. He is best known as a member of the boy group Ateez, formed by KQ Entertainment in 2018. He made his acting debut in the 2021 KBS drama Imitation with bandmates Yunho, San, and Jongho.

== Early life ==
Park Seong-hwa was born on April 3, 1998, in Jinju, South Gyeongsang Province, South Korea.

== Career ==
=== 2017–2019: Pre-debut and debut with Ateez ===
In 2017, Seonghwa was introduced as one of the trainees from KQ Fellaz, a pre-debut team formed by KQ Entertainment. Seonghwa made his debut as a member of Ateez on October 24, 2018, with the extended play Treasure EP.1: All to Zero.

=== 2020–present: Acting debut, modeling and other solo activities ===
In 2020, Seonghwa was cast, alongside fellow Ateez members Yunho, San and Jongho, in the KBS web drama Imitation, based on a webtoon of the same name about the lives of K-pop idols; Seonghwa played Nam Se-young, a member of the fictional group Sparkling, when the series aired in 2021.

On March 6, 2025, Seonghwa made his runway modeling debut at Isabel Marant's Fall/Winter 2025 womenswear show during Paris Fashion Week, becoming the first K-pop idol to walk in a show for the brand. In a second interview with The Hollywood Reporter following the show, Seonghwa said fashion was a means of self-expression for him and that "anyone, regardless of age or gender, should be able to wear the clothes that they want". On June 20, 2025, he walked the runway for Songzio's Spring/Summer 2026 show.

On January 21, 2026, Seonghwa was a runway model for the Songzio Fall/Winter 2026 show in Paris. In April 2026, in an interview with Marie Claire Korea, Seonghwa discussed his growth as a versatile vocalist, reflecting on how embracing a flexible vocal tone allowed him to adapt to various parts and develop into a "hexagon vocal" (all-rounder). On June 24, 2026, he walked the runway for Songzio's Spring/Summer 2027 show.

== Other ventures ==
=== Ambassadorship ===
In December 2025, Seonghwa was appointed a public relations ambassador for his native Jinju, South Korea.

=== Endorsements ===
On July 23, 2025, Seonghwa and fellow member Hongjoong were announced as the new models for the eyewear brand 'The Silent Soul'.

=== Fashion ===
In September 2024, Seonghwa attended Isabel Marant's Spring/Summer 2025 show during Paris Fashion Week, marking his fashion week debut; he discussed the experience in an email interview with The Hollywood Reporter, in which he reflected on attending as an individual rather than with the full group and on his choice to wear a look from the brand's womenswear line.

In February 2025, Isabel Marant named Seonghwa the face of its Spring 2025 menswear campaign alongside Kate Moss, making him the brand's first Korean and first K-pop ambassador; in an interview with WWD, Seonghwa said he had been drawn to the "bold and strong identity" the brand conveyed through its clothes and described feeling that designer Isabel Marant and artistic director Kim Bekker had "embraced me for who I am" during the Paris shoot.

In July 2025, the Korean fashion house Songzio named Seonghwa its first-ever global ambassador, fronting the brand's Autumn/Winter 2025 "Piccadilly" campaign. Songzio's creative director said the brand was "honored" to have Seonghwa as its first global ambassador, describing him as an artist "who appreciate[s] craftsmanship, architectural design, and cultural synthesis". He was also a part of Songzio's Spring/Summer 2026 campaign, "Polyptych," and their Fall/Winter 2026 campaign, "Crushed. Cast. Constructed."

== Artistry ==
Seonghwa shared that he draws performance inspiration from media such as the drama Alchemy of Souls, the franchise Star Wars, and singer DPR Ian, while also using poetry and journal writing as a means of connecting with fans and self-reflection.

== Public image ==
Seonghwa's fashion and appearances at fashion events have received coverage in Korean and international media, including his appearance at Isabel Marant's show, where he wore heeled boots.[14] In 2025, he was appointed a global ambassador for Isabel Marant and later became a global ambassador for the Korean fashion label Songzio.

== Discography ==
=== Soundtrack appearances ===
Title	Year	Album
"Diamond" as Se-young of Sparkling	2021	Imitation OST
"Your Sign" as Se-young of Sparkling	2021	Imitation OST
"Me Crazy" (with Hongjoong, Yunho, and Wooyoung)	2025	Sealook S2 OST
"Your Journey" (with Hongjoong, Yunho, and Wooyoung)	2025	Sealook S2 OST

== Filmography ==
=== Television series ===
Year	Title	Role	Ref.
2021	Imitation	Nam Se-young	

== Composition credits ==
All song credits are adapted from the Korea Music Copyright Association's database unless stated otherwise.

Year	Artist	Song	Album	Lyrics	Music
2018	Ateez	"From"	Non-album single	Yes	No
2023	Seonghwa and Hongjoong	"Matz"	The World EP.Fin: Will	Yes	No
2025	Seonghwa	"Skin"	Golden Hour: Part.3 'In Your Fantasy Edition'	Yes	No
