= Jung Wooyoung =

South Korean singer (born 1999)

Wooyoung
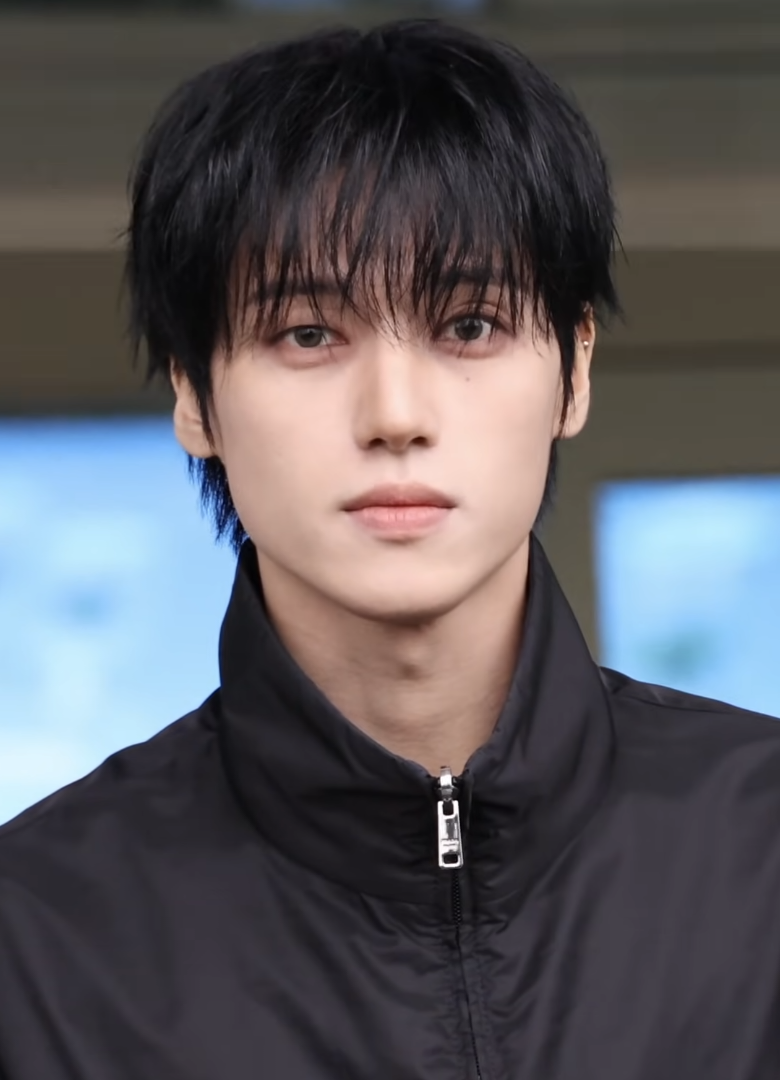
- Wooyoung in February 2026
- Born: Jung Woo-young; November 26, 1999 (age 26); Goyang, South Korea
- Education: Hanlim Multi Art School; Global Cyber University
- Occupations: Singer; dancer
- Musical career
- Genre: K-pop
- Instrument: Vocals
- Years active: 2018–present
- Label: KQ
- Member of: Ateez

Korean name
- Hangul: 정우영
- Hanja: 鄭友英
- RR: Jeong Uyeong
- MR: Chŏng Uyŏng

Signature
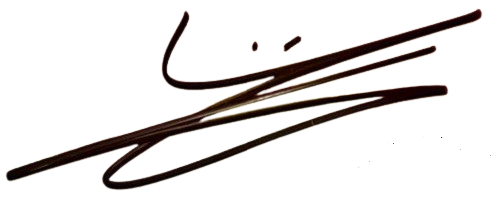

Jung Woo-young (Korean: 정우영; born November 26, 1999), known mononymously as Wooyoung, is a South Korean singer and dancer. He debuted as one of the vocalists for the South Korean boy band Ateez in 2018.

== Early life ==
Jung Woo-young was born November 26, 1999, in Goyang, South Korea. He attended Hanlim Multi Art School before enrolling at the Global Cyber University.

== Career ==
=== 2014–2017: Pre-debut ===
Wooyoung began training under BigHit Entertainment around 2014, where he met future bandmate Yeosang. Prior to 2017, Yeosang left BigHit and joined KQ Entertainment. Wooyoung later followed, citing their friendship as a key reason for his decision to leave BigHit and train under KQ instead.

In October 2017, Wooyoung represented KQ Entertainment in the JTBC survival reality program Mix Nine. He was one of four KQ trainees to pass the audition round and was ranked 57th during the "Just Dance" showcase. He was eliminated in the seventh episode, ultimately placing 132nd in the overall rankings. Following Mix Nine, Wooyoung was introduced as a member of KQ Fellaz, a pre-debut trainee group formed by KQ Entertainment.

=== 2018–present: Debut with Ateez and other solo activities ===
Wooyoung officially debuted with the boy group Ateez on October 24, 2018, with the release of their first extended play, Treasure EP.1: All to Zero.

In June, 2021, Wooyoung was selected as the 'Artist of the Month' by M2 and performed the song "Bad" by Christopher. The show selected artists specializing in dance every month and covered their performances and interviews.

On January 3, 2023, Wooyoung appeared in the first episode of Watcha's Fill in the Blank documentary which explored the "real" side of K-pop artists based on a hypothetical psychological theory that the lives of modern people can be explained with nine objects.

On May 25, 2024, Wooyoung threw the first pitch for the Lotte Giants in a game against the Samsung Lions in Busan.

On February 21, 2025, Wooyoung released the song "Sagittarius" with a music video. The song was later added to the Golden Hour: Part.3 'In Your Fantasy Edition' tracklist released on July 11, 2025. On June 10, singer Gallant released the song "Underpressure!" featuring Wooyoung. The song was performed at the Seoul Jazz Festival prior to its release.

On March 9, 2026, Wooyoung threw the first pitch for the South Korean team ahead of their World Baseball Classic game against Australia at the Tokyo Dome in Japan. On July 15, 2026, Wooyoung and fellow Ateez member San launched their joint YouTube channel named 9트쫑(9teujjong). On August 30, 2026, Wooyoung threw the ceremonial first pitch for the Lotte Giants in a game against the LG Twins at the Sajik Baseball Stadium in Busan.

== Personal life ==
On May 8, 2023, KQ Entertainment announced that Wooyoung will be going on a temporary hiatus due to an ankle injury.

On June 14, 2024, it was announced that Wooyoung will not be attending the Mawazine festival in Morocco due to cholinergic urticaria.

== Other ventures ==
=== Fashion ===
On September 25, 2024, Wooyoung attended the Courrèges SS25 show in Paris. On March 5, 2025, he attended the Courrèges FW25 Show during Paris Fashion Week. On September 30, 2025, he attended the Courrèges SS26 show as the only male Korean celebrity invited.

On February 26, 2026, Wooyoung attended the Prada FW26 womenswear show during Milan Fashion Week. In May, Wooyoung partnered with the fashion brand Studio Tomboy and Vogue Korea for a campaign which was then used for promotions in their flagship stores. It was reported that the sales of the men's products rose by 73% after the campaign. On August 27, Wooyoung was selected as Studio Tomboy's first global ambassador. It was reported that sales of key products from Studio Tomboy's men's line such as T-shirts and shirts worn by Wooyoung, increased by over 320% compared to last year.

=== Philanthropy ===
On June 17, 2025, it was revealed that Wooyoung had donated a signed cap for the MK Sports 15th anniversary charity auction.

== Impact and influence ==
In October 2022, Wooyoung drew national media attention after publicly addressing a choreography controversy involving Mnet's Street Man Fighter. Wooyoung made the street-dance "biting" gesture used to signal plagiarism during their performance at the 2022 Daegu Powerful K-pop Concert while dancing to "Say My Name". This was right after dancer Vata was accused of copying the signature "driving" sequence from the song without credit. He repeated the gesture across multiple subsequent stage performances, further emphasizing the point. The clips went viral, prompting the original choreographers to speak out and sparking broader media discussions on intellectual property rights for dancers and choreographers.

== Discography ==
=== As featured artist ===
Title	Year	Peak chart position		Album
Title	Year	KOR	US World	Album
"Underpressure!" (Gallant featuring Wooyoung)	2025	—	—	Non-album single

=== Soundtrack appearances ===
Title	Year	Album
"Me Crazy" (with Hongjoong, Yunho, and Seonghwa)	2025	Sealook S2 OST
"Your Journey" (with Hongjoong, Yunho, and Seonghwa)	2025	Sealook S2 OST

=== Unofficial releases ===
Title	Year	Album	Notes	Ref.
"Sagittarius"	2025	Non-album single	Added to Golden Hour: Part.3 'In Your Fantasy Edition'	

== Filmography ==
=== Television shows ===
Year	Title	Role	Notes	Ref.
2017–2018	Mix Nine	Contestant	Ranked 132nd overall (Male category)	

=== Web shows ===
Year	Title	Role	Notes	Ref.
2023	Fill in the Blank	Cast	Ep 1; Documentary on Watcha	
2026	9트쫑	Host	YouTube channel with San	

=== Radio shows ===
Year	Title	Role	Notes	Ref.
2020	Idol Radio	Special DJ	with San	

=== Host ===
Year	Title	Notes	Ref.
2024	The Show	Special host, Ep 355	

== Composition credits ==
All song credits are adapted from the Korea Music Copyright Association's database unless stated otherwise.

Year	Artist	Song	Album	Lyrics	Music
2018	Ateez	"From"	Non-album single	Yes	No
2023	San, Wooyoung and Yeosang	"It's You"	The World EP.Fin: Will	Yes	No
2025	Wooyoung	"Sagittarius"	Golden Hour: Part.3 'In Your Fantasy Edition'	Yes	No
