= Jeong Yun-ho =

South Korean singer and actor (born 1999)

Yunho
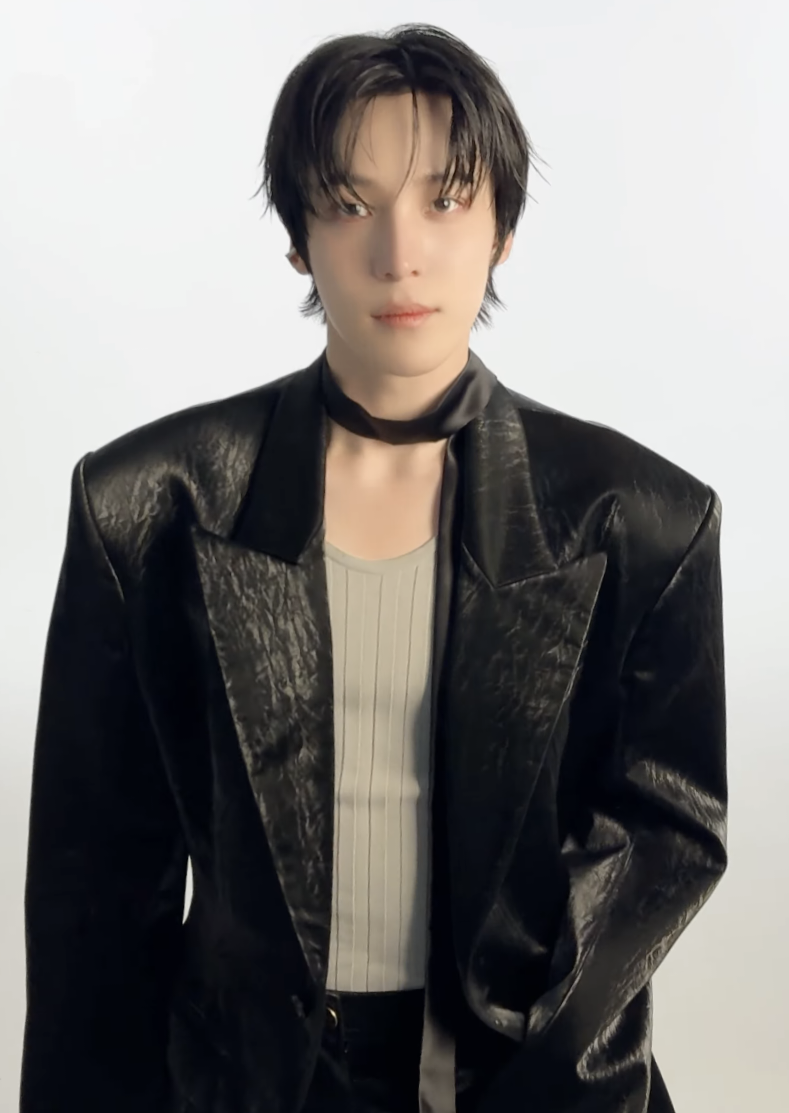
- Yunho in June 2025
- Born: Jeong Yun-ho; March 23, 1999 (age 27); Gwangju, South Korea
- Education: School of Performing Arts Seoul; Global Cyber University
- Occupations: Singer; dancer; actor
- Musical career
- Genre: K-pop
- Instrument: Vocals
- Years active: 2018–present
- Label: KQ
- Member of: Ateez

Korean name
- Hangul: 정윤호
- RR: Jeong Yunho
- MR: Chŏng Yunho

Signature
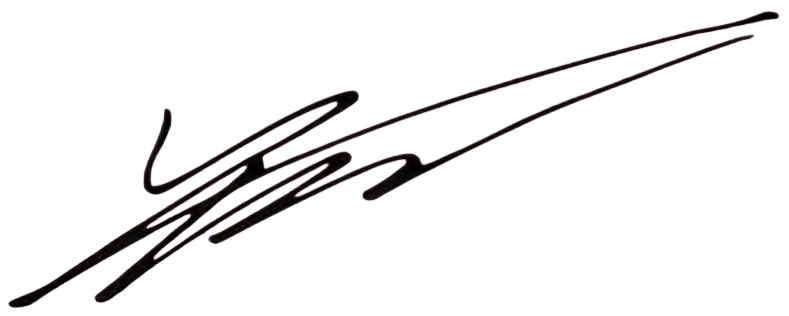

Jeong Yun-ho (Korean: 정윤호; born March 23, 1999), known mononymously as Yunho, is a South Korean singer, dancer and actor. He debuted as one of the dancers and vocalists for the South Korean boy band Ateez in 2018. He also made his acting debut in the 2021 KBS drama Imitation.

== Early life ==
Jeong Yun-ho was born March 23, 1999, in Gwangju, South Korea. He developed an interest in singing and performing at a young age and studied at local music and dance academies in Gwangju. Yunho moved to Seoul to attend the School of Performing Arts Seoul (SOPA), where he studied in the applied music department before enrolling at the Global Cyber University.

== Career ==
=== 2017–2019: Pre-debut and debut with Ateez ===
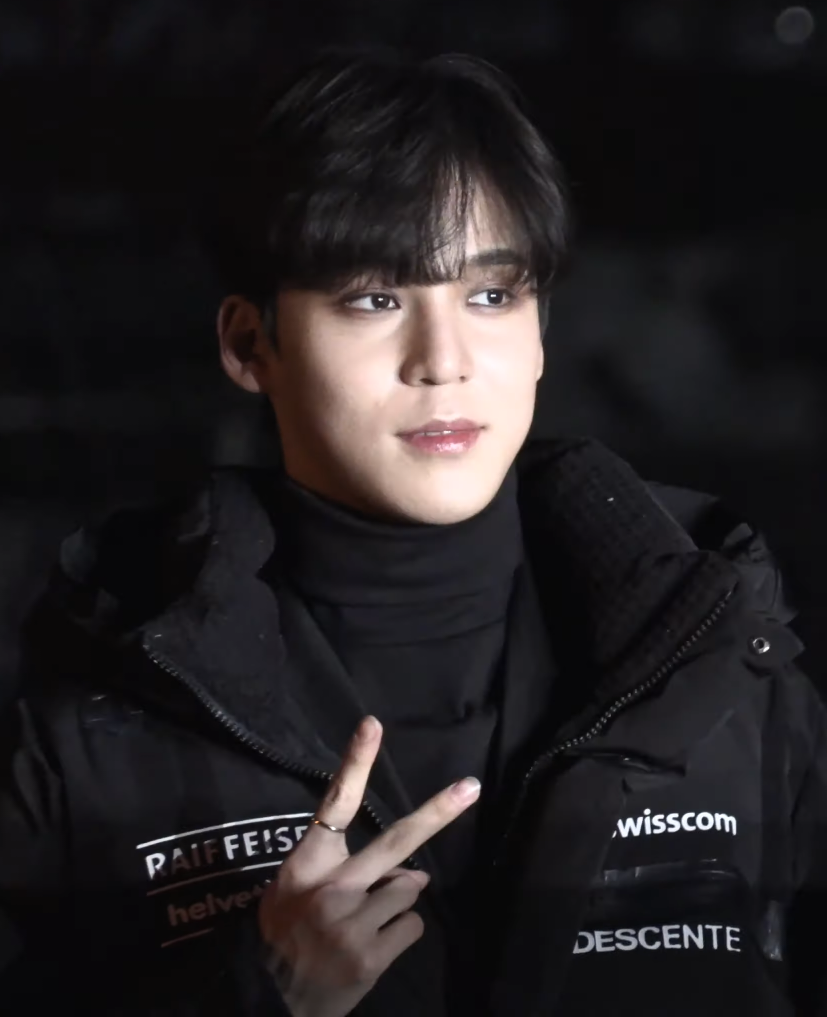
Yunho in 2019

Prior to his official debut, Yunho trained as part of KQ Fellaz, a pre-debut team formed by KQ Entertainment. He debuted with Ateez on October 24, 2018, when the group released their first EP, Treasure EP.1: All to Zero.

=== 2020–present: Acting debut, Idol Radio and OSTs ===
On October 16, 2020, Yunho was announced as part of the cast of the KBS drama Imitation, marking his acting debut. He portrayed the second lead Lee Yu-jin, center of the boy group Sparkling. The series aired from May 7, to July 23, 2021. He also took part in the OSTs "Diamond" as a member of the fictional group Sparkling and "Like When We First Met" with actress Jung Ji-so, in their acting roles as Yu-jin and Maha respectively.

On September 8, 2022, Yunho, alongside fellow Ateez member Hongjoong, was announced as the new DJs for the third season of MBC's radio program, Idol Radio. Their final episode as DJs aired on December 27, 2023, marking their departure from the show.

On May 25, 2024, Yunho threw the first pitch for the Kia Tigers in a match against the Doosan Bears in Gwangju. On August 1, Yunho appeared in the music video for the song "Kung Kung Dda" by Seo Eve. On October 3, Yunho released the song "Be Alright" with a lyric video.

On June 7, 2025, Yunho was once again invited by the Kia Tigers to throw the first pitch in a game against the Hanhwa Eagles. On July 5, Yunho released the soundtrack "On My Way to You" for the KBS2 drama For Eagle Brothers. On July 25, it was revealed that Yunho was cast in 전자두뇌 정과장, a short drama released to commemorate the 20th anniversary of Infinite Challenge. It was released on the Kanta Japan app on August 8, 2025. On July 28, CJ ENM unveiled the first teaser poster for the music film Back!Stage, confirming Yunho's lead role. The film was released at CGV theaters in Korea on August 18, 2025.

== Other ventures ==
=== Fashion ===
On September 7, 2024, Yunho attended the Kwak Hyun Joo 25S/S Collection show during the Seoul Fashion Week. On July 7, 2025, he attended the opening of new Seoul boutique by the Italian luxury house Ferragamo.

On February 24, 2026, Yunho attended the Diesel Fall Winter show during the Milan Fashion Week.

== Discography ==
=== Soundtrack appearances ===
Title	Year	Album
"Diamond" as Yu-jin of Sparkling	2021	Imitation OST
"Like When We First Met" with Jung Ji-so (as Yu-jin & Maha)	2021	Imitation OST
"On My Way to You"	2025	For Eagle Brothers OST
"Spotlight"	2025	Back!Stage film OST
"Me Crazy" (with Hongjoong, Seonghwa, and Wooyoung)	2025	Sealook S2 OST
"Your Journey" (with Hongjoong, Seonghwa, and Wooyoung)	2025	Sealook S2 OST

=== Unofficial releases ===
Title	Year	Album	Ref.
"Be Alright"	2024	Non-album single	

== Filmography ==
=== Film ===
Year	Title	Role	Notes	Ref.
2025	Back!Stage	Choi Gi-seok		

=== Television series ===
Year	Title	Role	Notes	Ref.
2021	Imitation	Lee Yu-jin		

=== Web series ===
Year	Title	Role	Notes	Ref.
2025	Electronic Brain Manager Jeong (전자두뇌 정과장)	Kim Min-hyuk	Released on Kanta Japan for Infinite Challenge 20th Anniversary	

=== Radio shows ===
Year	Title	Role	Notes	Ref.
2020	Idol Radio	Special DJ	Ep 471; with Hongjoong	
2022–2023	Idol Radio	Host	Season 3; with Hongjoong	

=== Host ===
Year	Title	Notes	Ref.
2021	The Show	Special host; Ep 277	
2021	2021 SBS Super Concert in Daegu	with Jeon Somi and YooA	
2022	The Show	Special host; Ep 306	
2023	KCON Japan 2023	Special host	
2023	Show! Music Core	Special host; Ep 815	
2023	Inkigayo Live in Tokyo	Special host	
2024	K-Wave Concert Inkigayo	Special host	
2024	Inkigayo Live in Tokyo	with Doyoung and Yunah	
2024	Music Bank	Special host; Ep 1230	

=== Music video appearances ===
Year	Song title	Artist	Ref.
2024	"Kung Kung Dda"	Seo Eve	

== Awards and nominations ==
Name of the award ceremony, year presented, award category, nominee(s) of the award, and the result of the nomination
Award ceremony	Year	Category	Nominee(s)/work(s)	Result	Ref.
Asia Artist Awards	2025	AAA New Wave (Actor)	Yunho	Won	
Seoul International Drama Awards	2022	Outstanding K-Pop Idol Actor	Imitation	Nominated	

== Composition credits ==
All song credits are adapted from the Korea Music Copyright Association's database unless stated otherwise.

Year	Artist	Song	Album	Lyrics	Music
2018	Ateez	"From"	Non-album single	Yes	No
2023	Yunho and Mingi	"Youth"	The World EP.Fin: Will	Yes	No
2024	Yunho	"Be Alright"	Non-album single	Yes	Yes
2025	Yunho	"Slide to me"	Golden Hour : Part.3 'In Your Fantasy Edition'	Yes	No
