= Jongho =

South Korean singer and actor (born 2000)

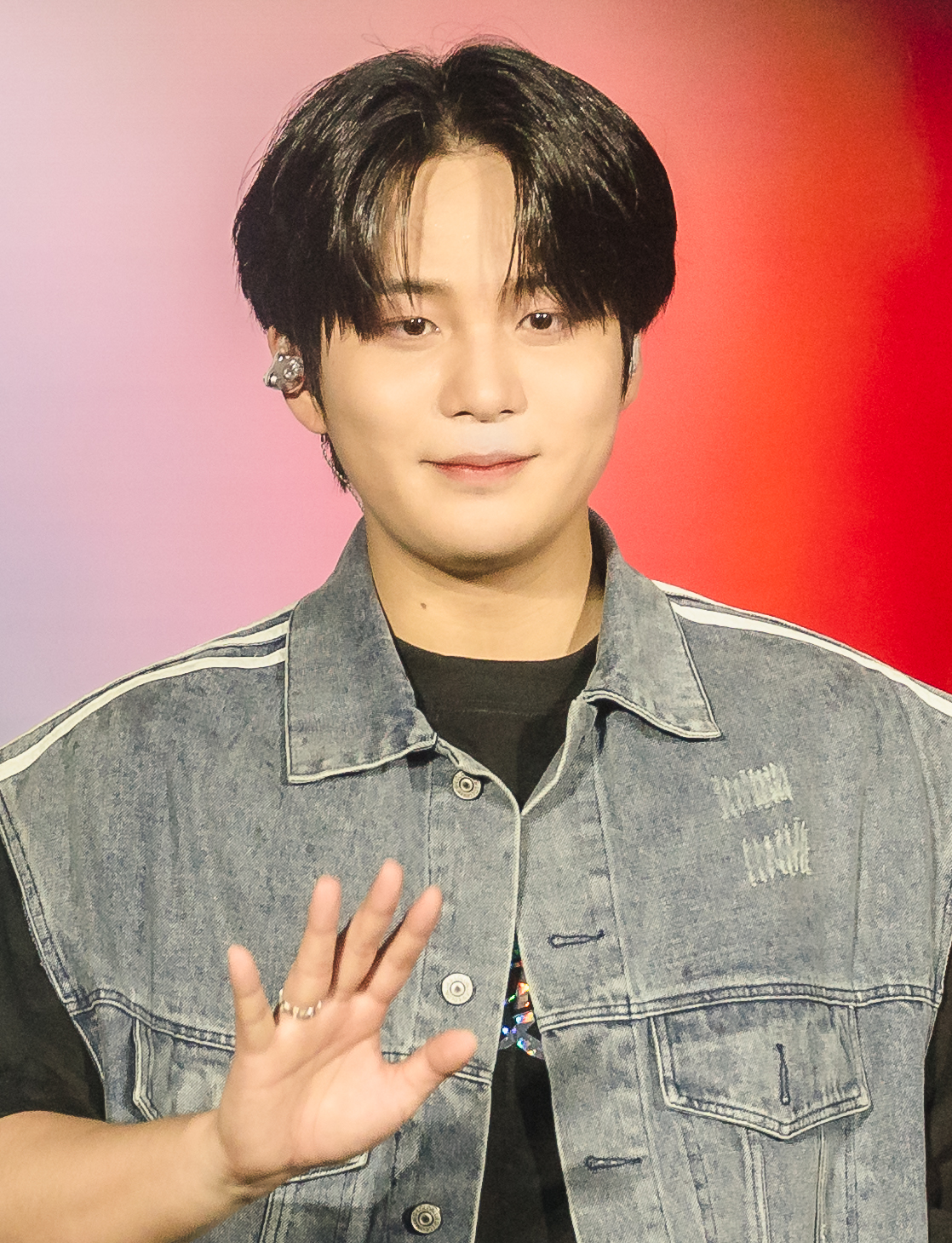
- Jongho in August 2024
- Born: Choi Jong-ho; October 12, 2000 (age 26); Seoul, South Korea
- Occupations: Singer; actor
- Musical career
- Genres: K-pop; R&B
- Instrument: Vocals
- Years active: 2018–present
- Label: KQ
- Member of: Ateez

Korean name
- Hangul: 최종호
- RR: Choe Jongho
- MR: Ch'oe Chongho

Signature
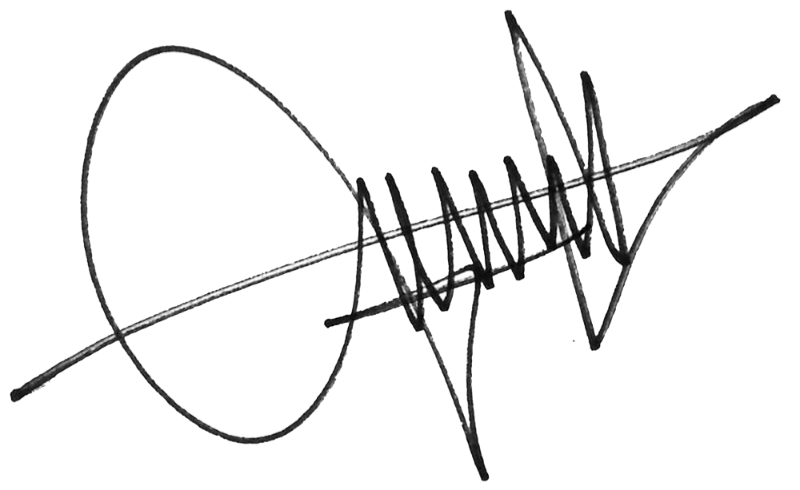

Choi Jong-ho (Korean: 최종호; born October 12, 2000), known mononymously as Jongho, is a South Korean singer and actor. He debuted as the main vocalist of the boy group Ateez in 2018. Jongho made his acting debut in the 2021 KBS drama Imitation. He also contributed to multiple original soundtracks of the drama as a member of Shax, a fictional idol group in the series.

== Early life ==
Choi Jongho was born on October 12, 2000, in Nowon District, Seoul, South Korea. Jongho graduated from Noil Middle School and Surak High School. He is currently enrolled in Global Cyber University in the Department of Broadcasting and Entertainment.

== Career ==
=== 2017: Pre-debut ===
In 2017, Jongho was introduced as one of the trainees from KQ Entertainment on the JTBC survival reality show Mix Nine. He was eliminated in the tenth episode with a final ranking of 43.

He was then introduced as a member of the pre-debut group "KQ Fellaz" alongside seven others, all of whom are now part of the boy group Ateez.

=== 2018–present: Debut with Ateez, solo activities and acting debut ===
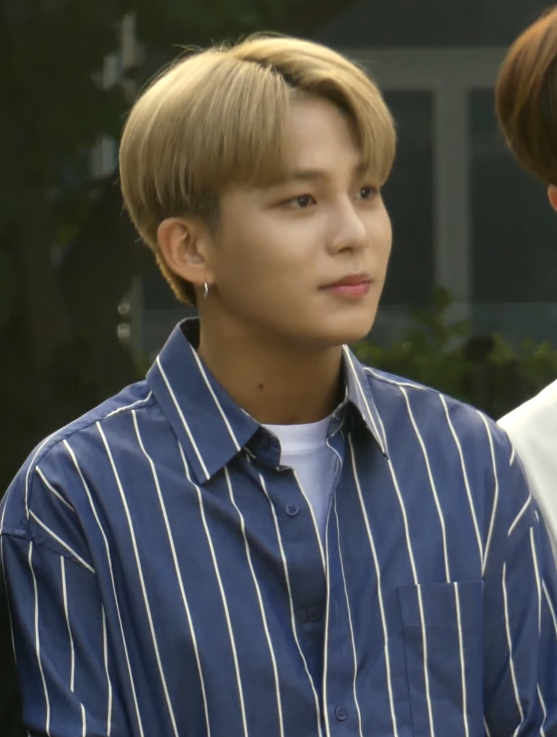
Jongho in 2019

On October 24, 2018, Jongho officially debuted as the main vocalist of KQ Entertainment's first boy group Ateez with the debut EP Treasure EP.1: All to Zero. Under the group's name, Jongho has performed two solo songs, "Everything", which he co-wrote as a part of Ateez fourth studio album The World EP.Fin: Will, and "To be your light" from the album Golden Hour: Part.3 'In Your Fantasy Edition'.

From May 2020 to May 2022, Jongho released covers of Korean drama original soundtracks under the project name "JJongST" (Korean: 쫑ST). The music videos accompanying the covers feature Jongho visiting and singing at the location where the respective dramas are shot. Other than JJongST, Jongho also released other covers including "Wild Flower" by Park Hyo-shin, "Ditto" by NewJeans with Maddox, "Dear Name" by IU with Ateez's San, and "Tell Me That You Love Me" by James Smith.

In 2021, Jongho debuted as an actor in the KBS2 drama Imitation with the role Yoon Hyuk, the youngest member of a fictional group Shax. In August 2022, Jongho participated in the contest to crown 184th Generation Mask King in the show King of Mask Singer with the stage name "Steamed Cypresses". In September 2022, Jongho released the soundtrack "A Fairy Tale of Youth" for the reality show Young Actors' Retreat. In the same year, he released the soundtrack titled "Gravity" for the drama Reborn Rich.

In February 2023, Jongho released the soundtrack for the historical drama Our Blooming Youth titled "Wind". In May 2023, Jongho took part in Immortal Songs: Singing the Legend and performed the song "So You" by Yarn. In June, he returned to the show with the song "Things to do Tomorrow" by Sung Si-kyung. In May 2024, Jongho released the soundtrack "A Day" for the drama Lovely Runner.

From November 2024 to January 2025, Jongho appeared on KBS2 Moving Voices in Munich, Germany alongside Hongjoong, Bae Suzy, Henry Lau, Sunwoo Jung-a, and Sohyang. On December 14, 2024, Jongho collaborated with STAYC's Sieun for a duet performance of "When It Snows" by Lee Mu-jin for the 2024 Music Bank Global Festival in Japan. On April 7, 2025, Kwon Soon-kwan of the South Korean indie band No Reply released the digital single "Our Memories" (Korean: 우리의 기억) featuring Jongho.

In August 2025, Jongho released the soundtrack "Just like the First Time" (Korean: 처음 그대로) for the drama The Nice Guy. Outside of his music career, Jongho is an avid baseball enthusiast, often expressing his support for the Doosan Bears. On August 27, 2025, Jongho was invited to throw the ceremonial first pitch at a Doosan Bears game. In October 2025, Jongho appeared in KBS2 The Seasons to perform "Good Day" by IU and "Because you're my woman" by Lee Seung-gi. In December 2025, Jongho released the music video for his solo song "To Be Your Light".

== Personal life ==
On August 26, 2023, KQ entertainment announced that Jongho would suspend his activities to undergo surgery and rehabilitation for his meniscus rupture. On October 12, 2023, it was announced that Jongho would be returning from his hiatus and joining the rest of Ateez for M Countdown in France.

== Discography ==
=== As featured artist ===
Title	Year	Album
"우리의 기억 (Our Memories)" (Kwon Soon-kwan featuring Jongho)	2025	Non-album single

=== Soundtrack appearances ===
Title	Year	Peak chart positions	Album
Title	Year	KOR	Album
"Malo" (as Hyuk of Shax)	2021	—	Imitation OST
"Amen" (as Hyuk of Shax)	2021	—	Imitation OST
"Trouble Maker" (as Hyuk of Shax)	2021	—	Imitation OST
"A Fairy Tale of Youth"	2022	—	Young Actors' Retreat OST
"Gravity"	2022	— (Note: "Gravity" did not enter the Circle Digital Chart, but debuted at number 98 on the component Download Chart.)	Reborn Rich OST
"Wind"	2023	—	Our Blooming Youth OST
"A Day"	2024	133	Lovely Runner OST
"Just like the First Time"	2025	—	The Nice Guy OST

== Filmography ==
=== Television series ===
Year	Title	Role	Notes	Ref.
2021	Imitation	Yoon Hyuk		

=== Television shows ===
Year	Title	Role	Notes	Ref.
2017–2018	Mix Nine	Contestant	Ranked 43rd overall (Male category)	
2022	King of Mask Singer	Contestant	Episode 369; Participated as "Steamed Cypresses"	
2023	Immortal Songs: Singing the Legend	Contestant	Episode 606	
2024	Immortal Songs: Singing the Legend	Contestant	Episode 662	
2024–2025	Moving Voices	Cast	Episode 6-10; In Germany	
2026	The Listen	Cast	Season 6	

=== Radio shows ===
Year	Title	Role	Notes	Ref.
2020	Idol Radio	Special DJ	Ep 470; with Hongjoong	

== Composition credits ==
All song credits are adapted from the Korea Music Copyright Association's database unless stated otherwise.

Year	Artist	Song	Album	Lyrics	Music
2018	Ateez	"From"	Non-album single	Yes	No
2023	Jongho	"Everything"	The World EP.Fin: Will	Yes	No
2025	Jongho	"To be your light"	Golden Hour: Part.3 'In Your Fantasy Edition'	Yes	No

== Accolades ==
=== Awards and nominations ===
Name of the award ceremony, year presented, award category, nominee(s) of the award, and the result of the nomination
Award ceremony	Year	Category	Nominee(s)/work(s)	Result	Ref.
APAN Star Awards	2023	Best Original Soundtrack	"Wind"	Nominated	
APAN Star Awards	2025	Best Original Soundtrack	"Just like the First Time"	Nominated	
Korea Grand Music Awards	2024	Best O.S.T	"A Day"	Nominated	
Newsis K-Expo	2025	OST Division	"A Day"	Nominated	
Seoul Music Awards	2025	OST Award	"A Day"	Nominated	

=== Listicles ===
Name of publisher, year listed, name of listicle, and placement
Publisher	Year	Listicle	Placement	Ref.
Forbes Korea	2024	The Best OST Singer	1	
Billboard	2025	Billboard K-Pop Artist 100	54	
