= Ateez =

South Korean boy band

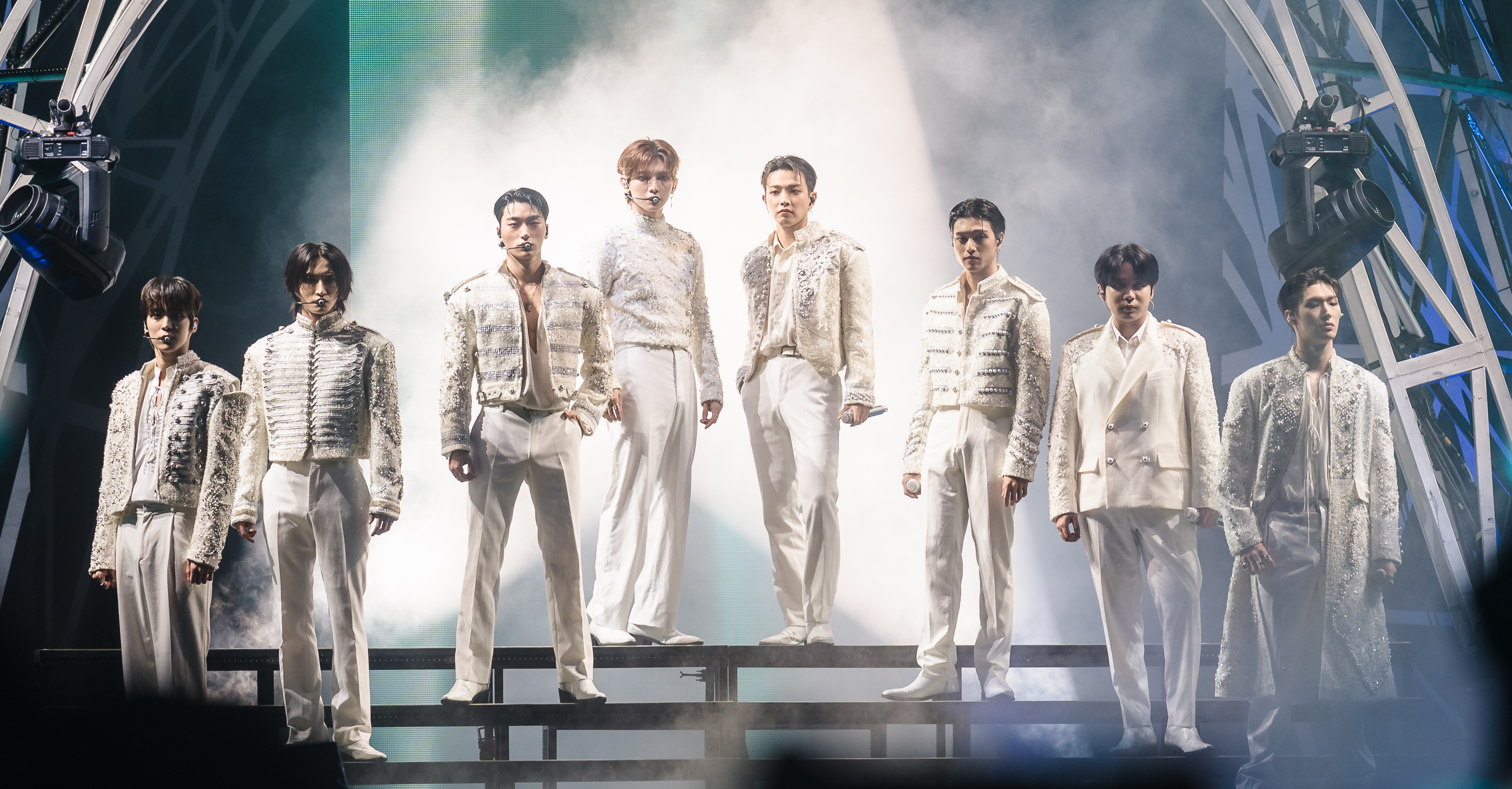
- Ateez in 2024; L–R: Yunho, Seonghwa, San, Yeosang, Hongjoong, Wooyoung, Jongho, and Mingi

Background information
- Origin: Seoul, South Korea
- Genres: K-pop; hip hop; trap; EDM
- Years active: 2018–present
- Labels: KQ; Legacy; RCA; Nippon Columbia; Universal Sigma
- Members: Hongjoong; Seonghwa; Yunho; Yeosang; San; Mingi; Wooyoung; Jongho
- Website: kqent.com/producer/1594

Ateez (Korean: 에이티즈; RR: Eitijeu; stylised in all caps) is a South Korean boy band formed by KQ Entertainment. The group consists of eight members: Hongjoong, Seonghwa, Yunho, Yeosang, San, Mingi, Wooyoung and Jongho. They debuted on October 24, 2018, with the extended play (EP) Treasure EP.1: All to Zero.

As of June 2026, Ateez have released fourteen EPs, two studio albums, twenty-eight singles, two single albums, one deluxe and repackaged album in the Korean language, as well as two single albums, three EPs and three studio albums in the Japanese language. Many of their albums each topped the South Korean Circle Album Chart, with Zero: Fever Part.1 becoming the group's first to be certified platinum and The World EP.1: Movement becoming their first to be certified million in the country. The group achieved their first No.1 on the Billboard 200 with their second studio album The World EP.Fin: Will and has secured multiple No.1's on the Billboard Top Albums Sales Chart. They are also the first South Korean musical act to have three different releases chart in the top 10 of the UK Official Albums Chart within a single year. As of July 2026, they are the group with the most top 10s on the Billboard 200 in the 2020s.

Often referred to as "Global Performance Idols" by Korean media and dubbed "Next Generation Leaders" by the Korean Ministry of Culture, Sports, and Tourism in 2020, Ateez have sold over eleven million physical albums worldwide. Their accolades include Prime Minister's Commendation at the 2025 Korean Popular Culture and Arts Awards and multiple bonsang (main prize) awards. They have also won nine daesang (grand prize) awards across various ceremonies. The group has also served as official global ambassadors for Korean culture and tourism. In 2024, Ateez became the first K-pop boy group to perform at Coachella and also the first K-pop group to headline the Mawazine music festival in Morocco.

== History ==
=== 2016–2018: Formation, pre-debut activities, and Treasure EP.1 ===
Plans for a new KQ Entertainment boy band began after a staff member discovered a letter and sample mixtape from Kim Hongjoong, who would eventually become Ateez's leader, expressing interest in becoming a trainee at the company. Hongjoong became the company's first official trainee and would remain the only one until Yunho joined six months later. Over the next year, members Mingi, San, Seonghwa, Yeosang, Jongho, and Wooyoung joined KQ Entertainment as trainees. Many had previous training experience at other companies: Mingi at Maroo Entertainment, Jongho at TOP Media, and Yeosang and Wooyoung at Big Hit Entertainment. They were known as "KQ Fellaz" prior to debuting.

In late 2017, Hongjoong, Mingi, Wooyoung, and Jongho competed on the survival reality show Mix Nine, placing 42nd, 63rd, 72nd, and 43rd out of all male contestants, respectively. On May 18, 2018, KQ Entertainment released the YouTube video "KQ Fellaz Performance Video I", which featured all eight Ateez members together for the first time, dancing to the song "Pick It Up" by rapper Famous Dex. Shortly after, the group premiered their pre-debut web series, KQ Fellaz American Training, showcasing the eight members in Los Angeles, California, training at The Millennium Dance Complex. During this period, a ninth trainee, Lee Jun-young, was promoted as a member of KQ Fellaz but ultimately not added to the final line-up. For the finale of the web series, KQ Fellaz released the music video of "From", a song composed and produced by Hongjoong.

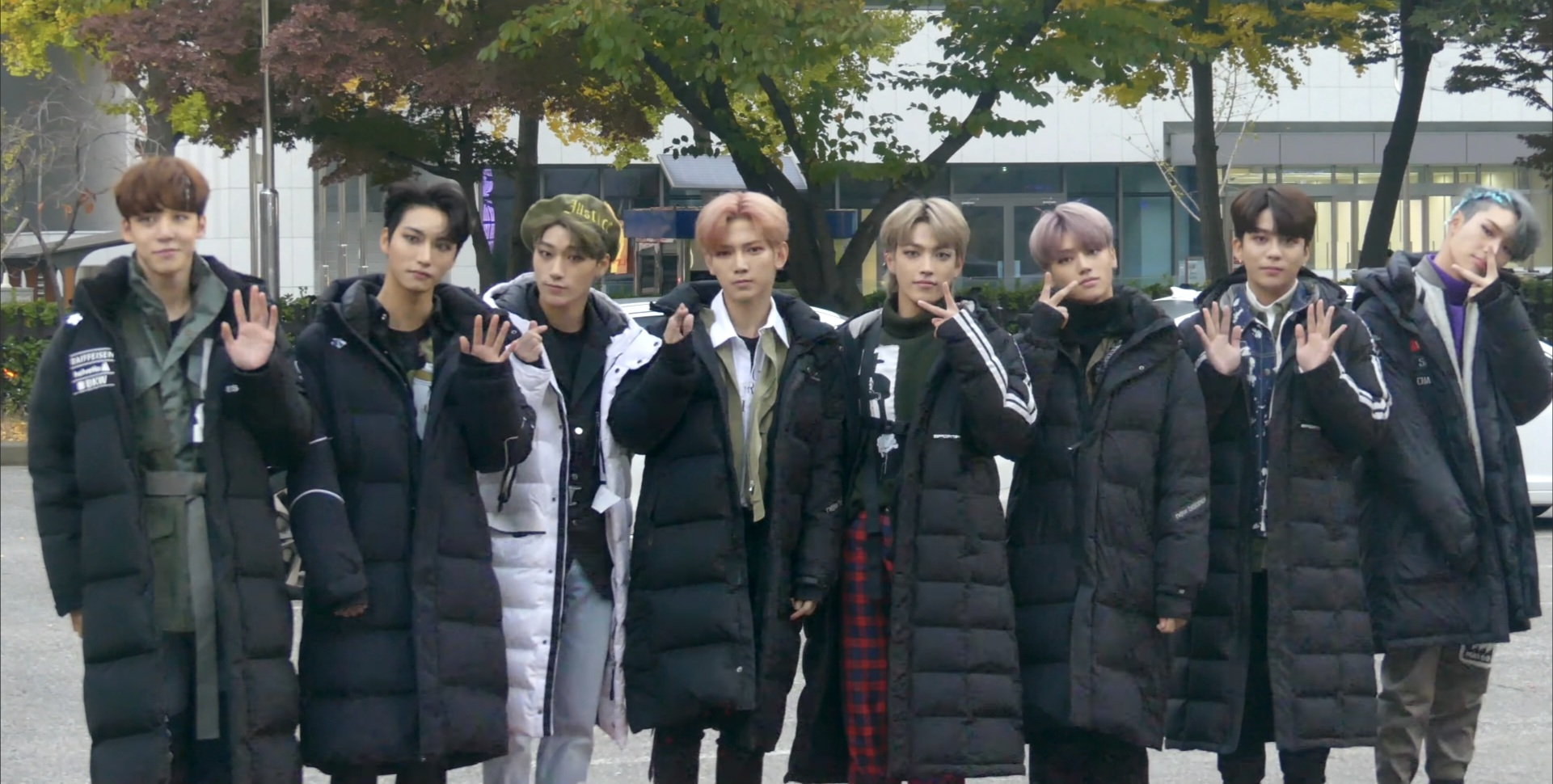
Ateez during "Pirate King" promotions in November 2018

KQ Entertainment announced a debut reality show with a set of three teasers. The second teaser, released on July 3, 2018, revealed the official name for the group: Ateez. The name, short for "A TEEnager Z", symbolises the group's goal to represent everything about teenagers, from A to Z. The show, Code Name Is Ateez, premiered on Mnet on July 20.

On October 24, 2018, Ateez released their debut EP, Treasure EP.1: All to Zero, alongside music videos for the two lead singles "Pirate King" (Korean: 해적왕; RR: Haejeogwang) and "Treasure". Their debut showcase was held on the same day. The album peaked at number seven on the weekly Gaon Albums Chart, selling 23,644 copies in 2018.

=== 2019: Breakthrough, first tour, and first studio album ===
On January 3, 2019, Ateez announced their first comeback EP, Treasure EP.2: Zero to One, with a teaser photo on their social media accounts. The EP was released on January 15, alongside a music video for the lead single "Say My Name". A music video for the track "Hala Hala (Hearts Awakened, Live Alive)" from the EP was released on February 7.

On January 24, Ateez announced their first tour, The Expedition Tour, with March dates in five American cities: New York City, Chicago, Dallas, Atlanta, and Los Angeles. The tour was then extended through April with the addition of European shows in London, Lisbon, Paris, Berlin, Amsterdam, Milan, Budapest, Stockholm, Warsaw, and Moscow. All American and European shows reportedly sold out. On May 17, Ateez performed at their first joint K-pop concert, KCON 2019 Japan, in Chiba, Japan. In early June, The Expedition Tour was extended again to visit Australian cities Melbourne and Sydney in August.

Ateez released their third EP, Treasure EP.3: One to All, on June 10. The lead single, "Wave", was selected via fan vote, winning in the competition over "Illusion". Music videos for both songs were released on the same day. On June 20, Ateez won their first music program award on M Countdown for "Wave", winning a second time on The Show five days later. On July 8, music video for the track "Aurora" was released. Ateez performed at KCON events in New York City and Los Angeles in July and August, respectively, and received the Soribada Award for Best Performance on August 20.

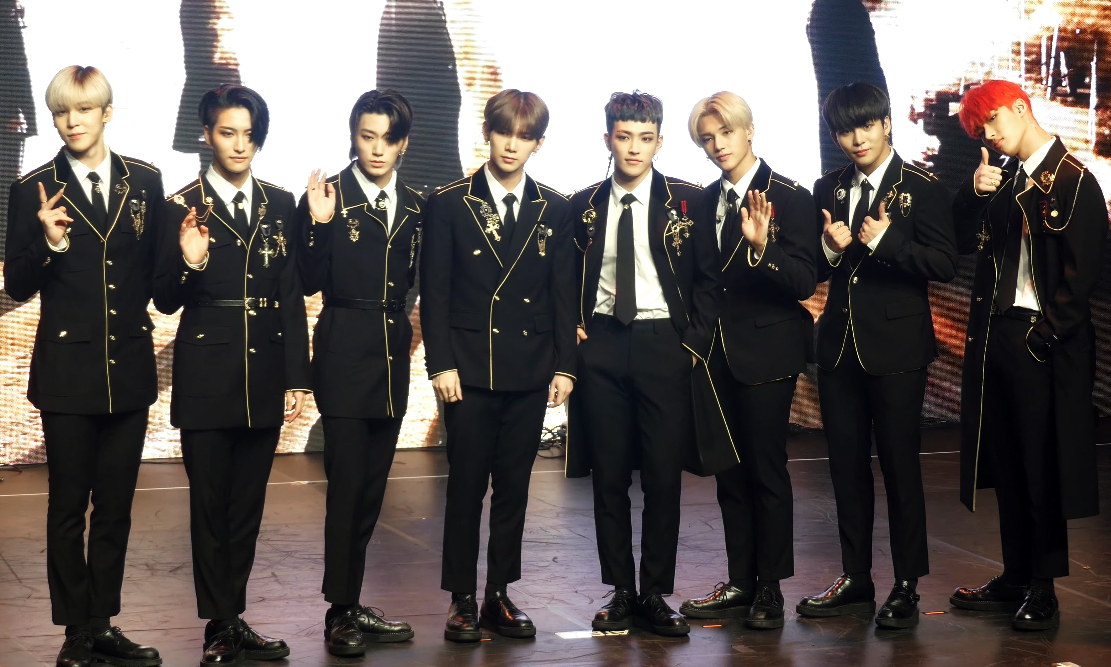
Ateez at the Treasure EP.Fin: All to Action showcase in 2019

On September 18, Ateez announced their third comeback with Treasure EP.Fin: All to Action, their first studio album. It was released on October 8 with a music video for lead single "Wonderland". The album sold 165,479 physical copies in South Korea in 2019 and became the first Ateez album to reach number one on the weekly Gaon Albums Chart. On November 3, Ateez won the Best Korean Act award at the 2019 MTV Europe Music Awards.

On November 10, they released their first Japanese-language music video for the song "Utopia", originally a track on Treasure EP.3. On December 4, their debut Japanese album Treasure EP. Extra: Shift the Map was released, and they won the Worldwide Fans' Choice Award at the Mnet Asian Music Awards in Nagoya, Japan on the same day.

=== 2020: Conclusion of Treasure series and start of Fever series ===
On January 6, 2020, Ateez released their fourth EP, Treasure Epilogue: Action to Answer, as the conclusion to their Treasure series, alongside a music video for lead single "Answer". The EP sold 179,796 physical copies in South Korea in 2020. On February 12, Ateez released their first Japanese EP Treasure EP.Map to Answer, with the Japanese version of "Answer" as the lead single.

The group's second world tour, The Fellowship: Map the Treasure, was scheduled to begin in Seoul in February before reaching seven European cities in March and two Japanese cities and five American cities in April. The Seoul tour dates were held as planned on February 8 and 9. However, due to concerns over the COVID-19 pandemic, the remaining tour dates were indefinitely postponed. Several tour dates had already been sold out; the shows in Amsterdam, Madrid, and Moscow were reportedly since January. All dates in United States were also sold out, including some arenas with capacities of over 18,000 people.

Due to COVID-19 restrictions, Ateez hosted a free, virtual concert called "Crescent Party" on the V Live app, with over 1.4 million viewers tuning into the live event on May 30. On June 26, they performed both the opening and closing stages at KCON:TACT 2020 and held their first virtual meet-and-greet with fans.

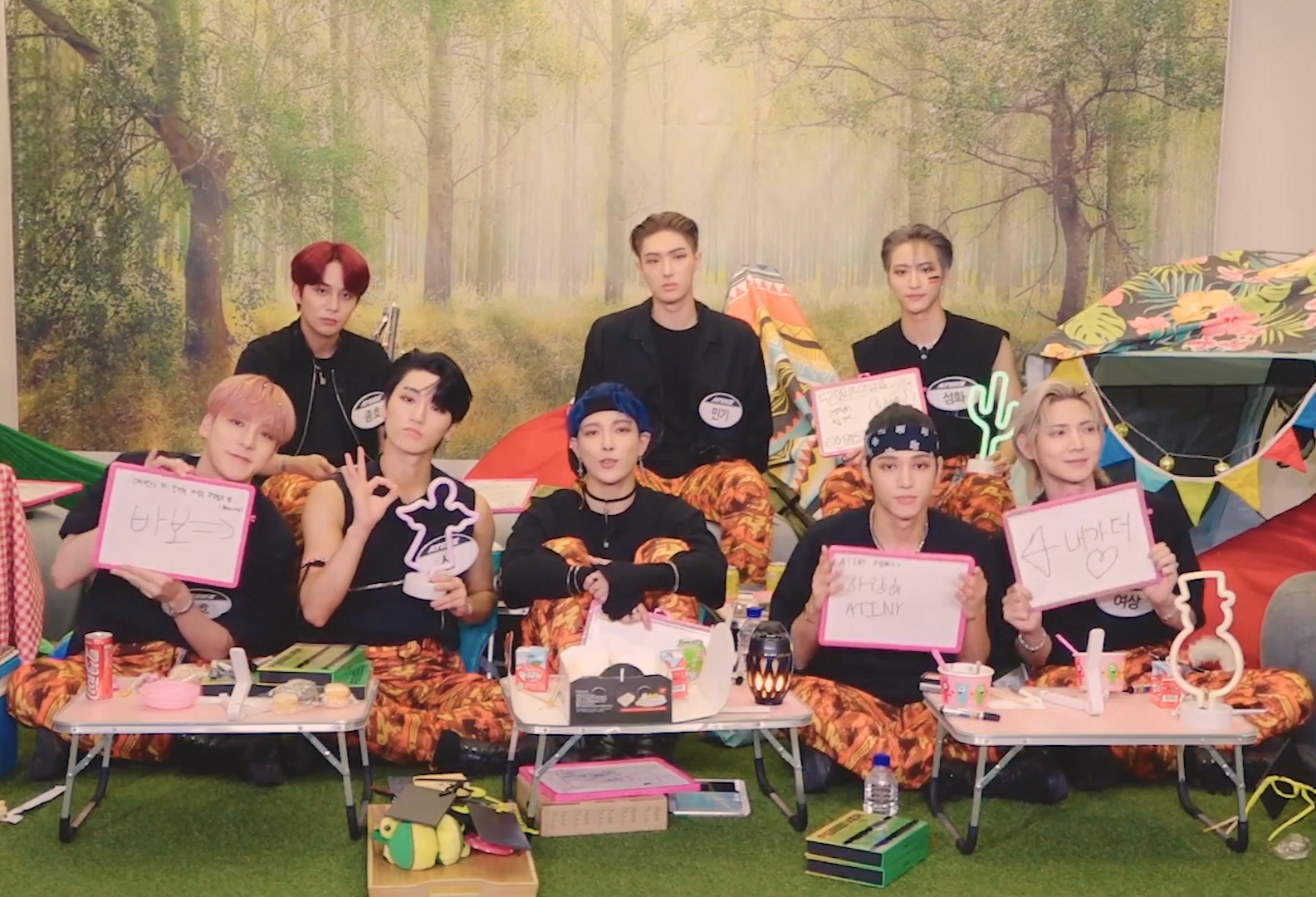
Ateez during "Thanxx" promotions in 2020

On July 4, Ateez released a promotional schedule for their fifth EP, Zero: Fever Part.1, their first release following the conclusion of the Treasure series. The lead single, "Inception", was voted by fans over the track "Thanxx". The EP was released on July 29, and Ateez received their third and fourth music program awards for "Inception" on August 4 and 5, on The Show and Show Champion. Music video of the other single, "Thanxx", was released on August 24. Zero: Fever Part. 1 sold 379,052 physical copies in South Korea in 2020, Ateez's first album to be certified platinum by the Korea Music Content Association, and made Ateez the second fourth-generation boy group to generate one million total sales as rookies.

On August 29, Ateez appeared on the South Korean television program Immortal Songs: Singing the Legend. They performed a cover of Turbo's "The Black Cat Nero" and won the episode, making them the first fourth-generation group and the sixth idol group overall to win on the program. On October 31, Ateez released a special Halloween music video version of "The Black Cat Nero", featuring the original artist Kim Jong-kook.

On November 15, it was announced that member Mingi would temporarily suspend promotional activities with the group in order to receive treatment for and recover from symptoms of psychological anxiety.

At the 2020 Mnet Asian Music Awards, Ateez won the Worldwide Fans' Choice and Discovery of the Year awards. During their performance at the show, it was announced that they would be joining The Boyz and Stray Kids on the inaugural season of Kingdom: Legendary War, an Mnet competition show which aired in April 2021.

On December 19, Ateez were the only idol group invited to the Immortal Songs year-end finale "King of Kings", where they performed their version of Seo Taiji and Boys' "Anyhow Song". According to an official Twitter survey, Ateez were the fifth most tweeted-about musician in the United States in 2020, after BTS, Kanye West, Beyoncé, and Drake, and the 10th most tweeted-about K-pop group in the world.

=== 2021: Fever series, Kingdom and domestic promotions ===
On January 31, Ateez received their first Bonsang (main award) at the 30th Seoul Music Awards. They returned to Immortal Songs: Singing the Legend for a third time and won the episode on February 6 by performing a rendition of Rain's "It's Raining", making them the only K-pop boy group with multiple wins on the program.

On March 1, their sixth EP, Zero: Fever Part.2, was released with a music video for promoted single "Fireworks (I'm the One)" (Korean: 불놀이야; RR: Bulnoriya). Ateez received their fifth music show win on The Show on March 9 for the song. Zero: Fever Part.2 was certified double platinum on July 8, having sold over 500,000 copies. On March 24, Ateez released their first original Japanese studio album Into the A to Z with "Still Here" as the lead single.

In addition to their music releases, the group and individual members participated in various Korean television programs. In March, Yeosang became a co-host of SBS MTV's music program The Show. Meanwhile, Yunho, Jongho, Seonghwa, and San were cast in the KBS2 television drama Imitation, which aired from May to July. The competition show Kingdom: Legendary War that Ateez participated in alongside five other K-pop boy groups first aired on April 1. For the final round, they released the song "멋 (The Real)" on May 28, which Mingi participated in recording but not performing. The group finished in third place overall. On May 22, Ateez returned to Immortal Songs for a fourth time, winning with their performance of Psy's "Right Now" and consequently tying with Mamamoo for most wins by an idol group on the show.

On July 9, KQ Entertainment confirmed that San tested positive but was asymptomatic for COVID-19. All members except Mingi suspended their activities to enter self-isolation until July 23, and San stayed at a treatment center until he was released on July 19. On July 19, it was announced that Mingi would be returning to group activities.

On July 28, Ateez released their first Japanese single "Dreamers", which served as the fifth ending theme for the 2020 reboot anime series Digimon Adventure. On August 4, Ateez announced an album collaboration with Kim Jong-kook titled Season Songs, with lead single "Be My Lover" (Korean: 바다 보러 갈래?; RR: Bada Boreo Gallae?), which was released on August 16. On August 19, it was announced that Ateez collaborated with American a cappella group Pentatonix on the single "A Little Space", set for digital release the following day.

On September 13, Ateez released their seventh EP, Zero: Fever Part.3. The lead single "Deja Vu" was voted on by fans over the track "Eternal Sunshine". Pre-orders for the EP surpassed 800,000 copies, more than double that of their last release. It debuted at number one on the Billboard World Albums Chart, and the group reached a new peak on the Billboard World Digital Songs Chart with "Deja Vu" charting at number four. The EP debuted at number 42 on the Billboard 200, their first appearance on the chart. Ateez also topped the Billboard Emerging Artists Chart. Domestically, they received their sixth music show win on MBC M's Show Champion for "Deja Vu" on September 22. The EP received double platinum certification on November 11, having surpassed the 500,000 copies sales mark.

On October 2, Ateez won the Artist of the Year award on The Fact Music Awards. On October 31, They performed at the SBS Super Concert in Daegu, where Yunho was appointed as one of the hosts. On November 14, it was announced on their virtual concert "Fever: eXendtion edition" that the group's third world tour, The Fellowship: Beginning of the End, would be held in 2022. The world tour was scheduled to begin with three dates in Seoul in early January and proceed to five cities in the US in the latter part of the month before concluding on March 1 after shows in six European cities.

On December 10, Ateez released their first repackaged EP, Zero: Fever Epilogue, featuring the lead singles "Turbulence" (Korean: 야간비행; RR: Yaganbihaeng) and "The Real (Heung version)" (Korean: 멋 (흥 ver.); RR: Meot (Heung ver.)). The album included tracks previously introduced as performances on Kingdom, and was certified platinum. On December 25, Ateez made a return to Immortal Songs year-end finale "King of Kings" with a mashup of Block B's "Nillili Mambo", Big Bang's "Fantastic Baby", and their own song "The Real (Heung version)".

=== 2022: Two world tours, The World EP.1: Movement, Spin Off: From the Witness and Japanese releases ===
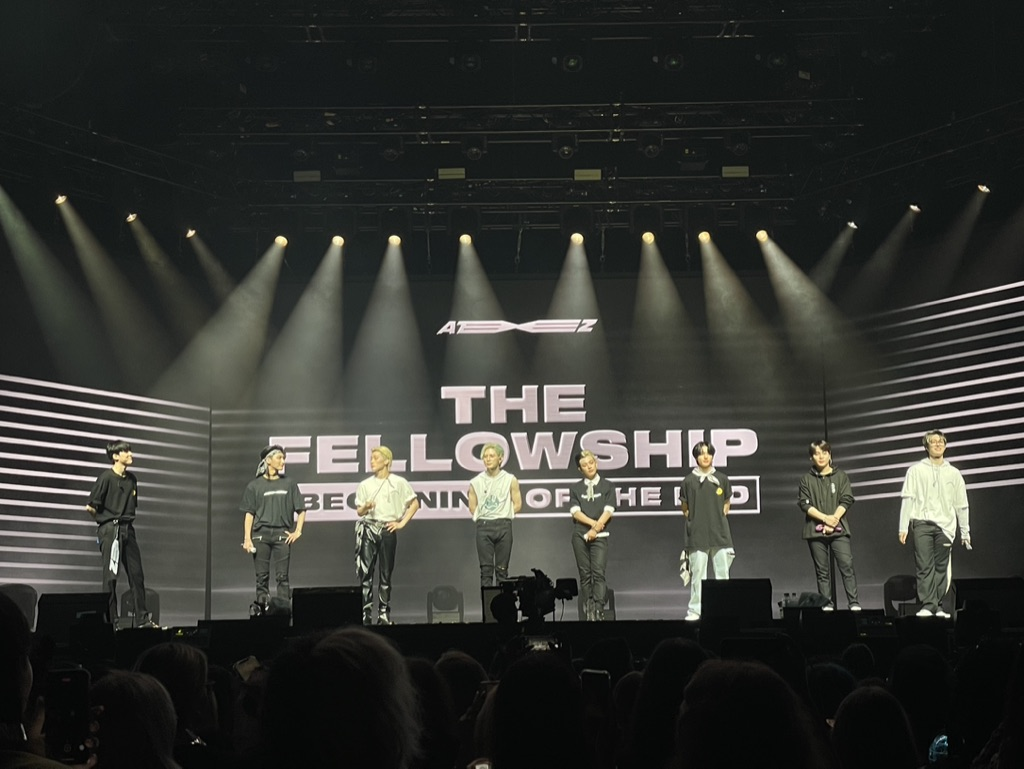
Ateez at The Fellowship: Beginning of the End world tour in 2022

Ateez held their first offline concerts in two years in Seoul from January 7 to 9. The Fellowship: Beginning of the End world tour continued with six sold-out shows in Chicago, Atlanta, Newark, Dallas and Los Angeles in the United States in January. On January 18, it was announced that Yeosang would continue his role as co-host of The Show for a second year. On January 23, Ateez won the main award on the 31st Seoul Music Awards.

On January 31, they released the promotional single "Don't Stop" through Universe Music for the platform Universe. On February 3, it was announced that Ateez would appear on Global Spin Live at the Grammy Museum on February 8. They performed and participated in an interview, as well as an audience question-and-answer segment on the live event.

The European leg of the Fellowship: Beginning of The End world tour was rescheduled to late April and May; eight shows in Madrid, London, Paris, Berlin and Amsterdam were held, while the Warsaw show was cancelled. Three additional shows in Yokohama, Japan in mid-July were also announced.

On May 25, Ateez released their second Japanese EP, Beyond: Zero, with lead single "Rocky (Boxers Ver.)". The EP charted at number two on the Oricon weekly album chart, Line Music weekly album chart and Billboard Japan Top Album Sales chart.

On June 30, they performed at the Jeddah K-pop Festival in Saudi Arabia. On July 3, they closed the second day of UNI-KON 2022 in Seoul.

On July 29, Ateez released their eighth Korean EP The World EP.1: Movement, featuring the lead single "Guerrilla". Pre-orders exceeded 1.1 million copies, making it their first million-selling EP. Album sales in the first week totalled to over 930,000 physical copies, and the EP topped South Korea's Circle Album Chart for two consecutive weeks. The album charted at number three on Billboard 200 in the United States, Ateez's first top 10 on the main chart. The group wrapped up their album promotions with six music program awards for "Guerrilla", winning first places on The Show, Show Champion and Music Bank.

On August 22, Ateez performed at KCON 2022 LA and were selected to perform the LA version of KCON 2022's signature song "Poppia". On September 8, it was reported that Hongjoong and Yunho had been chosen as DJs for MBC Radio's Idol Radio Season 3 and that the show would incorporate Ateez's colours by adopting a "space pirate" concept. On September 9, Ateez released an original soundtrack for the web drama Mimicus, titled "Let's Get Together".

Ateez performed in several joint concerts across Asia during September and October, including Kpop Land 2022 in Jakarta, K-pop Masterz Ep.2 in Manila and Bangkok, KCON 2022 Saudi Arabia in Riyadh, Powerful Daegu K-pop Concert Restart, and KCON 2022 Japan in Tokyo. On October 8, Ateez received the Artist of the Year Bonsang, as well as the Best Performer award at The Fact Music Awards.

Ateez opened their second world tour of the year, The Fellowship: Break The Wall, with two sold-out concerts in Seoul on October 29 and 30. They embarked on the North American leg, comprising eleven shows in Oakland, Anaheim, Phoenix, Dallas, Chicago, Atlanta, Newark and Toronto. They closed the 2022 part of the tour with two shows in Chiba, Japan. KQ Fellaz 2, a pre-debut boy group from the same label as Ateez, served as the opening act of all the shows except for the one in Canada.

On November 30, Ateez released their third Japanese EP, The World EP.Paradigm, featuring the lead single "Paradigm". It ranked first on the weekly edition of the Oricon Albums Chart, as well as on the Oricon Weekly Combined Album Chart. The album also ranked first on the Billboard Japan Top Album Sales chart with 124,584 physical copies sold in the first week, making it Ateez's first EP to top these charts.

On December 7, Ateez released the soundtrack song "Like That" for the anime Lookism, an adaptation of the eponymous webtoon. On December 15, it was announced that the group would release the opening theme "Limitless" for the anime Duel Masters WIN.

On December 22, KQ Entertainment released a comeback trailer for Ateez's first Korean single album, Spin Off: From the Witness, which was released on December 30, led by the single "Halazia". The single album entered the top 10 of Billboard 200 at number seven and the Billboard's Top Album Sales at number two, making it their third and second time on the two charts, respectively. "Halazia" brought Ateez their 13th music show trophy, winning first place on Music Bank on January 6.

=== 2023: Continuation of Break the Wall world tour and conclusion of The World series ===
After finishing their domestic promotions for Spin Off: From the Witness, Ateez promoted their EP The World EP. Paradigm in Japan from January 29 to February 3. On February 10, the group embarked on the European leg of the Fellowship: Break The Wall world tour in Amsterdam, followed by eight shows in Berlin, Brussels, London, Madrid, Copenhagen and Paris. On March 8, Yeosang was announced to continue as one of the hosts of The Show for a third consecutive year. On March 19, Ateez performed at KCON Thailand at the IMPACT Arena.

On March 22, the group released Limitless, their second Japanese single album, including the opening song of the same name they recorded for the anime Duel Masters WIN.

Between April and May, Ateez performed in multiple events such as the 2023 Lovesome Festival in Seoul, the K-POP Super Live at Seoul Festa 2023, the Dance Day Live 2023 in Tokyo, and KCON Japan 2023 in Chiba. They also carried out six encore concerts out of the Fellowship: Break The Wall tour in Seoul, Tokyo and Chiba.

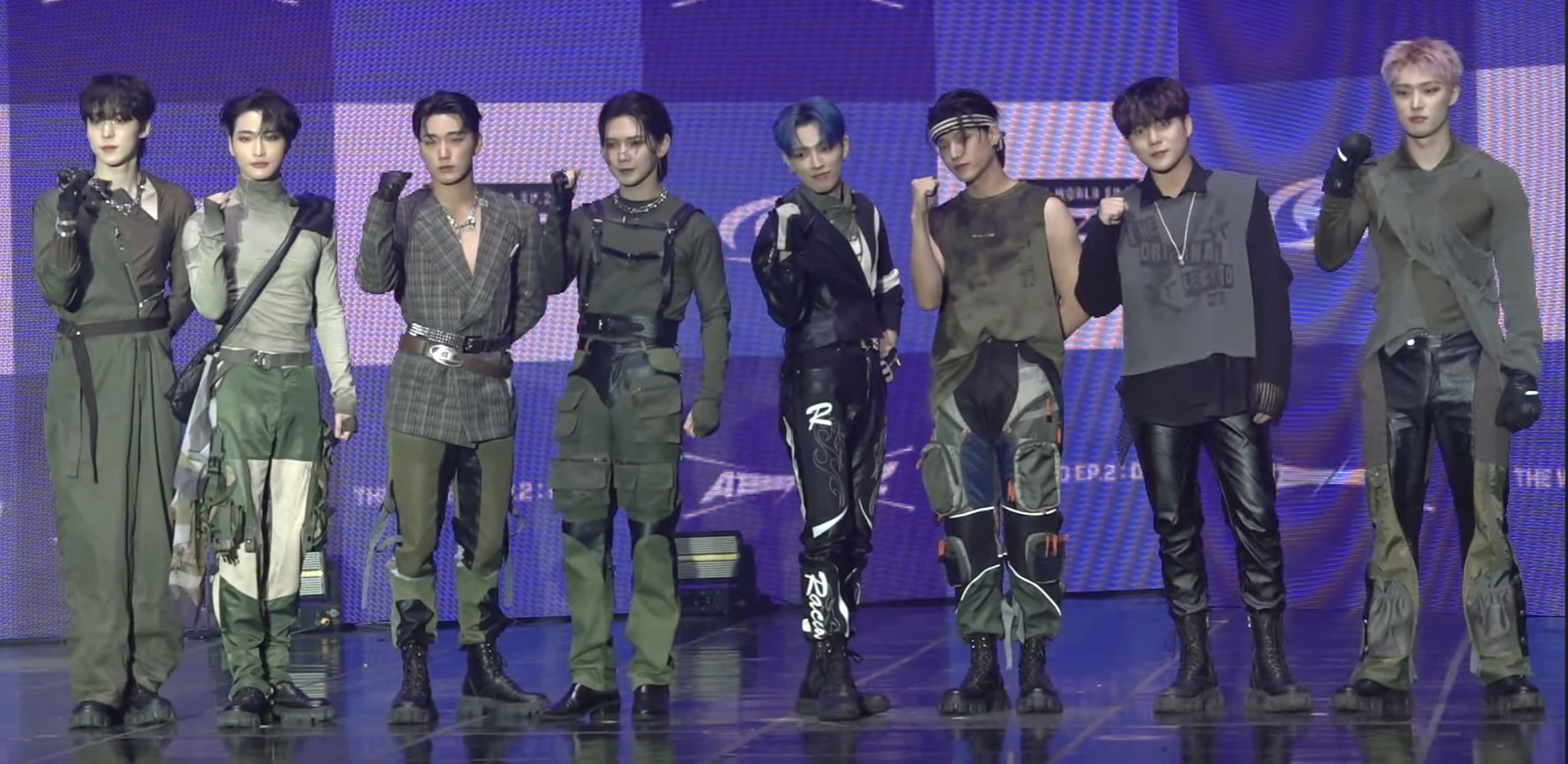
Ateez at The World Ep.2: Outlaw showcase in 2023

The group released their ninth EP The World EP.2: Outlaw on June 16. It became the group's most successful comeback, reaching No.2 on the Billboard 200, No.1 on the Billboard Top Albums Sales Chart and No.10 on the UK Officials Albums Chart.

On June 17, Ateez appeared on Immortal Songs: Singing the Legend for the sixth time. They performed their rendition of the song "Highway in the Gale", originally sung by Yoo Jung Seok and won their fourth trophy making them the K-Pop idol group with the most wins on the show.

On July 8, Ateez opened their Asian leg of The Fellowship: Break The Wall world tour in Taipei, followed by concerts in Hong Kong and Bangkok. As a part of the world tour, they held a solo concert in Jeddah on July 20, becoming the first fourth-generation idol group to do so. On August 23, they continued on with the Latin American leg of the world tour with shows in Mexico City, São Paulo, Santiago and Bogotá. They played their first ever stadium concert at the Allianz Parque in São Paulo. On September 9, they resumed their Asian leg of the tour with a concert held in Singapore. They closed the tour on the 16th with a show in Manila.

On December 1, the group released their second studio album, The World EP.Fin: Will. The album reached No.1 on the Billboard 200, No.1 on the Billboard Top Albums Sales Chart and No.2 on the UK Officials Album Chart. They sold over 1.7 million copies in the first week, making it their third million seller album following The World EP.1: Movement and The World EP.2: Outlaw. This album also earned them their first ever triple crown on KBS Music Bank.

On December 27, it was announced that Hongjoong and Yunho would be stepping down as DJs for MBC's Idol Radio.

=== 2024: Towards the Light: Will to Power world tour, Coachella, Golden Hour: Part. 1 and 2, Mawazine and Japanese releases ===
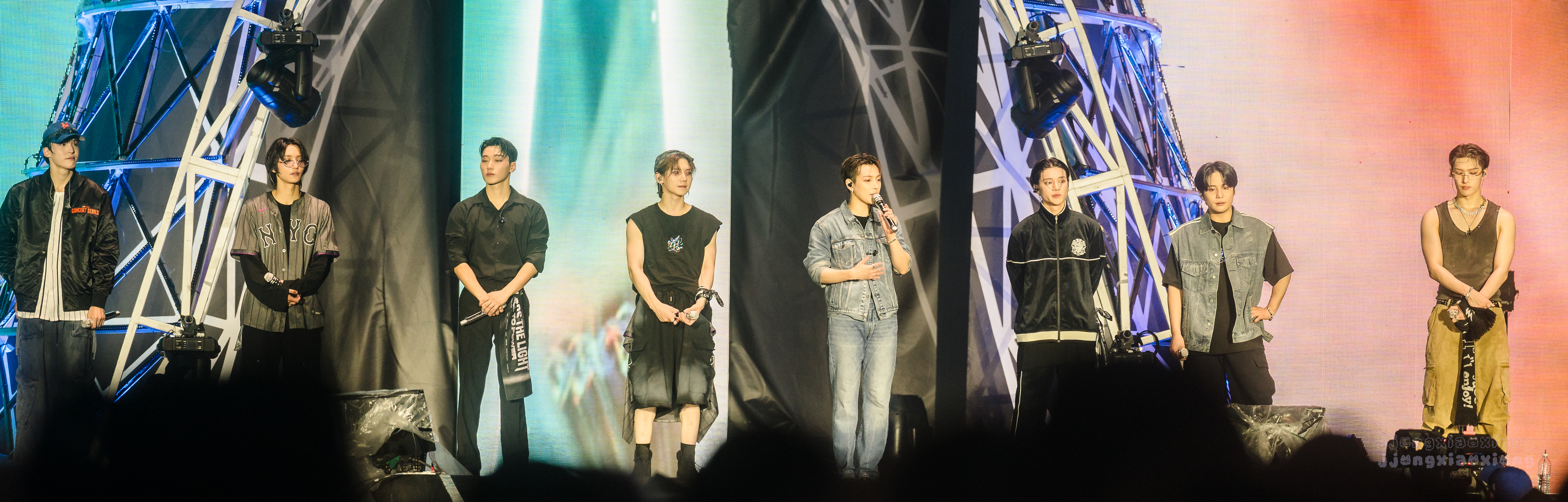
Ateez at the Towards the Light: Will to Power world tour in 2024

Ateez started the year by opening their world tour Towards the Light: Will to Power in Seoul, South Korea. The sold-out concerts were held on January 27 and 28 at the Jamsil Indoor Stadium. The tour continued as they performed at the Saitama Super Arena in Saitama, Japan on February 3 and 4 which were sold-out on both days.

On February 6, Ateez were named as Record Store Day's first K-Pop Artist of the Year. On February 28, Ateez released their third Japanese single "Not Okay". It debuted No. 2 on the Oricon Singles Daily Chart, No. 1 on Recochoku Daily Album Chart, No. 2 on the Billboard Japan Top Singles Sales Chart and No. 4 on Billboard Japan Hot 100 Chart.

On March 5, it was announced that Yeosang would be stepping down as co-host for SBS MTV's The Show after three years. On March 11, Hongjoong was featured in Chung Ha's single "Eenie Meenie". On March 28, it was reported that Ateez will be a part of the first K-pop exhibition hosted by the Grammy Museum from April 10 to June 10. On March 31, Ateez performed at KCON Hong Kong 2024.

On April 12 and 19, Ateez became the first K-pop boy group to grace the stage at Coachella, one of the biggest music festivals in the world. On April 20, Ateez were invited to throw the first pitch for the LA Dodgers in a MLB game against the Mets. On April 26 and 28, Ateez performed at Cartier 'Crystallization of Time' exhibition and 'High Jewelry Gala Dinner' in Seoul.

On May 26, Ateez performed at the Yonsei University 'AKARAKA' Festival. On May 29, they performed at the Sungkyunkwan University Festival. On May 31, Ateez released their tenth EP Golden Hour: Part.1 along with the lead single "Work" and its music video. The EP debuted No.2 on the Billboard 200, No.1 on the Billboard Top Albums Sales Chart, No.4 on the UK Official Albums Chart, No.1 on the UK Official Physical Albums Chart and No.1 on the Billboard Japan Top Albums Sales Chart. The group also became the first South Korean musical act to score three new top 10 titles on the UK Official Albums Charts ranking in the span of a year. They sold over 1.5 million copies in the first week, making it their fourth million seller album.

On June 2, Ateez performed at the K-Wave Concert Inkigayo. On June 10, they made their US television debut on The Kelly Clarkson Show. On June 23, Ateez became the first South Korean musical act to perform and headline the Mawazine festival, the second largest music festival in the world. The group took the OLM Souissi stage as one of the two artists scheduled to play that day and attracted huge crowds of spectators. On June 28 and 29, they performed at the BEAT AX Vol.4 music festival held at the Makuhari Messe in Chiba, Japan and on June 30, they performed at Show! Music Core in Japan.

On July 1, Ateez collaborated with the Japanese boy group Be:First for the single "Hush-Hush". On July 6 and 7, Ateez held their fanmeeting titled ATINY's Voyage: From A to Z in Seoul. On July 14, Ateez embarked on their North American leg of the Towards the Light: Will to Power world tour with shows in Tacoma, Oakland, Los Angeles, Phoenix, Arlington, Duluth, New York, Washington D.C, Toronto and Rosemont. This tour also marked some of their first ever stadium venues in North America which included the BMO Stadium, Globe Life Field and Citi Field.

On August 17 and 18, Ateez performed at the Summer Sonic festival held in Osaka and Chiba. On August 21 and 22, Ateez held a second 'ATINY's Voyage: From A to Z' fanmeeting in Tokyo.

On September 4, Ateez collaborated with the Japanese boy group Be:First for the second time for the digital single "Royal".

On October 1, Ateez released their fourth Japanese single "Birthday". It debuted No. 3 on the Billboard Japan Top Singles Sales Chart and No. 4 on the Billboard Japan Hot 100 Chart.

On November 15, Ateez released their eleventh EP Golden Hour: Part.2, with the lead single "Ice on My Teeth". It debuted at No. 1 on the Billboard 200.

=== 2025: Continuation of "Towards the Light: Will to Power" world tour, Golden Hour: Part. 3, In Your Fantasy edition, "In Your Fantasy" world tour and contract renewal ===
On January 18, Ateez began the European leg of their world tour, Towards the Light: Will to Power, with shows in Lyon, Milan, Zurich, London, Manchester, Amsterdam, Barcelona, Cologne, Copenhagen, Berlin, Paris and Brussels. They also became the first K-pop group to hold and sell-out a concert in Europe's largest indoor venue, Paris La Défense Arena. The tour concluded on March 23 following two encore performances in Seoul.

On March 18, Ateez won iHeartRadio's K-Pop Artist of the Year award. On March 28 and 29, Ateez held a third 'ATINY's Voyage: From A to Z' fanmeeting in Kobe. On March 31, Ateez announced their fifth world tour, In Your Fantasy, covering South Korea, North America, and Japan.

On April 23, they were nominated for the American Music Awards' Favorite K-Pop Artist award.

On May 14, Ateez released the concert film, Towards the Light: Will to Power, showcasing their January 2024 performance at the Jamsil Arena in Seoul. The film was screened across Asia, North America, Europe, and other countries, and presented by CJ 4DPLEX and Trafalgar Releasing via ScreenX, 4DX, Ultra 4DX, and traditional 2D formats.

On June 13, Ateez released their twelfth EP Golden Hour: Part.3, with the lead single "Lemon Drop". It debuted at No. 2 on the Billboard 200. "Lemon Drop" debuted at No. 69 on the Billboard Hot 100, marking Ateez's first entry on the chart and making them the third K-pop boy group to chart on the Billboard Hot 100.

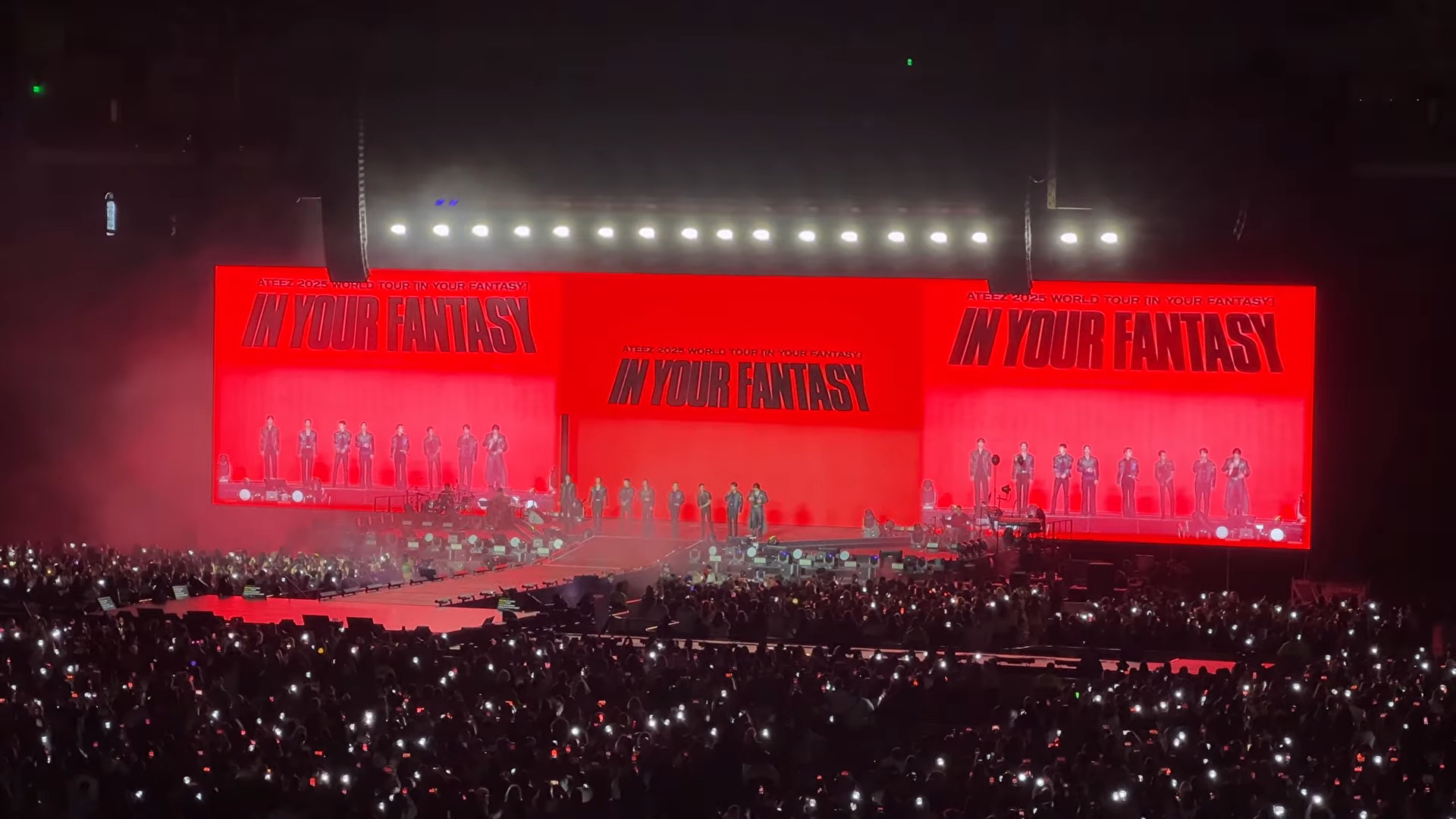
Ateez performing at the BMO Stadium during their In Your Fantasy Tour in August 2025

On July 10, it was announced that all eight members of the group had decided to renew their contracts with KQ Entertainment for the next 7 years. They opened the North American leg of In Your Fantasy world tour with shows in Atlanta, New York, Baltimore, Nashville, Orlando, Chicago, Tacoma, San Jose, Los Angeles, Glendale, Arlington and Mexico City. On July 11, Ateez released the deluxe version of their twelfth EP Golden Hour: Part.3 'In Your Fantasy Edition', with the lead single "In Your Fantasy". The title debuted at No. 68 on the Billboard Hot 100.

On September 13, Ateez continued their world tour, In Your Fantasy, with shows in Saitama, Nagoya and Kobe. On September 17, Ateez released their second Japanese full-length album Ashes to Light.

=== 2026: Continuation of "In Your Fantasy" world tour, Golden Hour: Part.4, Part.5 and Part.6 and BST Hyde Park ===
On January 17, Ateez held their second fanmeeting, titled Dawn:26, in Seoul. On January 24 and 31, they held concerts as part of their In Your Fantasy world tour in Taipei and Jakarta.

On February 6, the group released their thirteenth EP, Golden Hour: Part.4 with the title track "Adrenaline". It debuted No. 3 on the Billboard 200. The EP also debuted No. 1 on the Circle Album Chart and sold over 1.5 million copies during the first week of release, making it their sixth million seller. The group secured five music show wins, which also marked their first-ever wins on both Show! Music Core and Inkigayo. From February 22 to April 4, they held multiple concerts in Singapore, Melbourne, Sydney, Manila, Kuala Lumpur, Macau and concluded the world tour with a show in Bangkok.

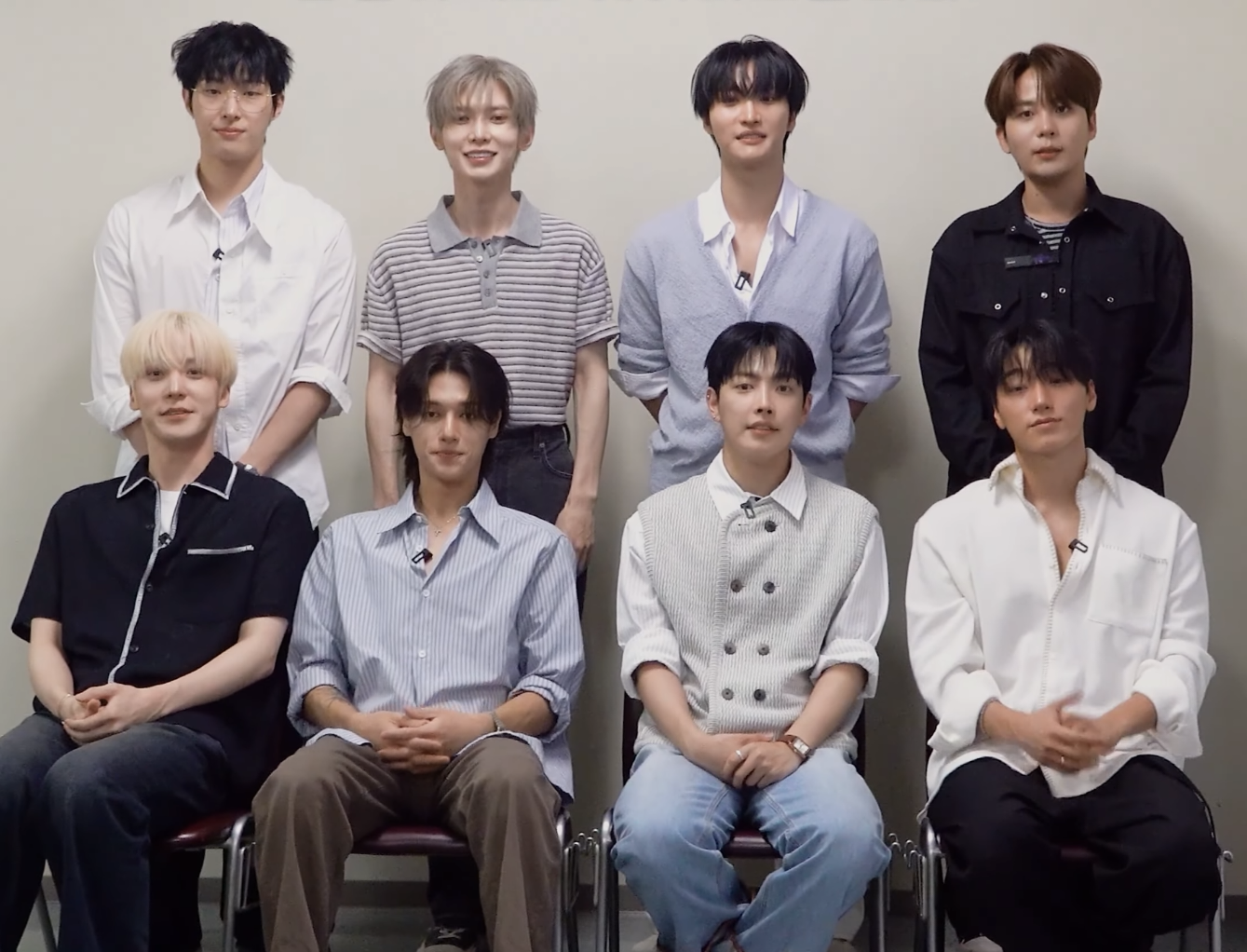
Ateez in 2026

On June 26, Ateez released their fourteenth EP, Golden Hour: Part.5 with the title track "Bad". It debuted No.1 on the Billboard 200 with 228k units, making them the group with the most top 10s in the 2020s. In South Korea, "Bad" entered the top ten across all major domestic streaming services, including the real-time and daily charts of Melon, Bugs, Flo, Vibe, and Genie, making Ateez the only fourth-generation boy group to do so. On June 28, they became the third K-pop group to headline the BST Hyde Park festival.

On October 7, the group announced their fifteenth EP Golden Hour: Part.6 to be released on November 13, 2026. On October 23, the pre-release single "Drip" was released.

== Artistry ==
=== Musical style and lyrical themes ===
According to Rolling Stone India, Ateez integrates elements of hip-hop, trap, dubstep, and pop to construct their signature sound. Their music incorporates varied influences, including Middle Eastern, indie pop, tropical house, synthwave, and trap-infused slow tempos. Members of the group actively participate in the songwriting, production, and conceptualisation of their releases. The group's lyrical themes frequently focus on teamwork, confidence, perseverance, and unity, while their lead singles are often characterised as anthemic and powerful.

According to Forbes, Ateez's multifaceted artistry is reflected in their style and youth-focused messaging. Their lyrics delve into the growth and decision-making process that humans experience during adolescence. Earmilk describes the group's discography as a powerful combination of hip-hop and electronic trap. And that it is dark-tinged and of bold musicality. USA Today describes the group's music as having a "varied nature", which highlights their versatility and adaptability.

ATEEZ has always taken on new challenges in terms of sounds and genres throughout the various albums we've released until now. Honestly, I think we've enjoyed challenging ourselves to try new things because there's no need to confine ourselves to a specific genre if the music can highlight and bring together the strengths of the individual members. While we've had songs where we focused on a more cinematic and dramatic style to follow a storyline, we also understand the joy of the entertainment that can be found in the music itself. This track brings this to the forefront, even bolder in sound and creative in the blending of each member's unique abilities. I'm excited for us to be able to continue to showcase ATEEZ's distinct identity within a framework we create for ourselves through various musical challenges and performances.

— Hongjoong for 1883 Magazine

=== Stage performances and concepts ===
Rolling Stone India wrote that Ateez gained attention for their clean choreography and strong facial expressions. The article noted that, instead of relying on a specific debut concept, the group focused on performing well on stage. It added that they showed confidence, good stage presence and a clear team dynamic, and that their music had a strong, defined style. The review also said that their work follows the K-pop industry’s use of cinematic production and hidden narrative elements, with much of the meaning expressed through their movements. Their choreography was described as precise, detailed and well-coordinated.

Consequence described that the group tends to explore various genres but excels in explosive, theatrical performances. Their group concept incorporates pirate imagery. The "Ateez" style of music and dancing stands out from that of many of their peers in the industry. While precise choreography has typically been the industry standard, the members of the group aren't afraid to let their individual strengths shine onstage.

Billboard noted that the group was known for honing its intense choreography and showmanship during performances. According to USA Today, Ateez are known for their powerful performances and concepts. They bring high energy with a flair of cool.

The Clash Music report on Ateez' Towards the Light: Will to Power world tour in Washington D.C talks about the storyline that is woven into each project and performance which adds to the worldbuilding experience for the audience. The report notes that performing is their way of "rebelling" against the real-life industry that had little faith in them, and the fictitious oppressive government in their storyline. Anarchy and mutiny appeared to be the dominant themes in their narrative. 1883 Magazine elaborates on the comprehensive concept where the group members exist as pirates in search of their treasure. They've created an expansive universe that explores themes of fixation, discovery, being outcasts, ambiguous morality, and obsession, all of which transcend language barriers to resonate with people worldwide.

== Other ventures ==
=== Ambassadorship ===
On May 8, 2020, the Korean Ministry of Culture, Sports, and Tourism named Ateez as its 2020 ambassador to help promote Korean culture and tourism abroad. The group participated in the "Overcome Together" relay challenge to encourage safer practices to avoid COVID-19 and served as ambassador of the Talk Talk Korea Contest in 2020.

=== Endorsements ===
On January 28, 2021, Ateez filmed a commercial for the LG webOS TV. On July 1, it was announced that members Hongjoong and Yunho would participate in the 2021 Pepsi Taste of Korea Campaign, in collaboration with K-pop artists Rain, Brave Girls and Monsta X for the song "Summer Taste", which was released on July 14.

On February 3, 2022, Ateez collaborated with online fashion store Poshmark. On July 14, Ateez was announced as advertising model for Korean cosmetics brand Mernel.

On January 5, 2024, Ateez was selected by the cosmetics brand Nacific as its brand model. On March 21, Ateez were revealed as the exclusive model for Cafe BomBom. On March 22, Ateez was selected as an advertising model for the Japanese pharmaceutical brand Rohto UV. On April 23, Ateez collaborated with ABC-Mart for Adidas' "CLIMACOOL" series campaign.

On July 3, 2025, Ateez were selected as the new model for the Korean mud skincare brand BRMUD. On September 5, American fashion brand Avirex and Ateez announced the release of a collaborative capsule collection to commemorate the brand's 50th anniversary. On November 12, Ateez were selected as the promotional model for Shilla Duty Free.

=== Philanthropy ===
On August 31, 2020, Mingi and Yeosang participated in Star Bookstore, a relay donation campaign in which celebrities read books to children in disadvantaged situations. The audiobooks that each member recorded surpassed 10,000 views within one day of release, leading to a donation of ₩2 million from Happy Bean on behalf of the two members towards various welfare organisations in Korea. On September 14, Ateez were chosen as ambassadors for Polished Man, an initiative raising funds for trauma prevention and recovery programs for young survivors of violence. Ateez member Hongjoong had raised awareness for the campaign since Ateez's debut by painting one of his nails, leading fans to set up fundraising pages on Polished Man's website to raise hundreds of dollars in 2019 and early 2020 before Ateez officially partnered with the campaign. As of July 2021, funds raised through the partnership with Polished Man have exceeded $30,000.

On May 15, 2021, Ateez appeared on Identity 2021, a live stream fundraiser hosted by Amazon Music in honour of Asian Pacific American Heritage Month. The campaign raised over $20,000 towards Pacific Bridge Arts Musical Scholarships and the Gold House AAPI Community Fund.

In November 2022, in the wake of the Seoul Halloween crowd crush, Ateez donated ₩100 million to the Hope Bridge Korea Disaster Relief Association, using profits from their concerts to support those affected by the accident.

In 2025, Ateez donated ₩100 million to the Hope Bridge National Disaster Relief Association to help with the recovery of wildfire stricken areas by providing emergency livelihood support, relief supplies, and operating temporary shelters for residents in Ulsan, Gyeongbuk, and Gyeongnam.

== Members ==
- Hongjoong (김홍중) – leader, rapper, composer
- Seonghwa (박성화) – vocalist
- Yunho (정윤호) – performance, vocalist
- Yeosang (강여상) – vocalist, performance
- San (최산) – vocalist, performance
- Mingi (송민기) – rapper, performance
- Wooyoung (정우영) – performance, vocalist
- Jongho (최종호) – vocalist

== Discography ==
Korean albums

- Treasure EP.Fin: All to Action (2019)
- The World EP.Fin: Will (2023)

Japanese albums

- Treasure EP.Extra: Shift the Map (2019)
- Into the A to Z (2021)
- Ashes to Light (2025)

== Filmography ==
=== Television series ===
Year	Title	Notes	Ref.
2021	Imitation	Roles played by Yunho, Jongho, San and Seonghwa	

=== Television ===
Year	Title	Notes	Ref.
2018	Code Name Is Ateez (작전명 Ateez)	Pre-debut reality show	
2019	Ateez: Treasure Map	Part 1: Long Journey, Part 2: Showcase	
2019	Ateez Treasure Film	Reality show filmed in Australia and the US	
2020	Kang-on Box (韓ON! BOX! )		
2021	Salary Lupin Ateez		
2021	Kingdom: Legendary War		

=== Web shows ===
Year	Title	Notes	Ref.
2018	KQ Fellaz 미국 연수기	Pre-debut training in LA	
2019	Ateez Wanted		
2019	Ateez Long Journey		
2019	Ateez Anewz		
2020	Ateez 82 Challenge	Premiered on Facebook Watch, 8 episodes	
2020	Ateez Fever Road		
2020	Kids Teaching Idol		
2021	The Man of Ateez	Collaboration special with Kim Jong-kook	
2021	Pirate Reboot: The Five Treasures	Universe original	
2021	Parasite Challenge Double Up	Universe original	
2022	Ateez Wanted Special	Showcase with Korea Tourism Organization	
2022	The Vikings	Universe original	
2022	The Curse of the Money Hole	Universe original	
2022	Gae Ppang Meong Ateez	Universe original	
2022	Real Now – Ateez	Premiered on Naver Now mobile app	
2022	Hello Teez-Mon		
2022–present	Wanteez	Variety show	

=== Radio shows ===
Year	Title	Notes	Ref.
2019	School Road (스쿨로드)		
2022–2023	Idol Radio (아이돌라디오) Season 3	Hongjoong and Yunho as the hosts	

== Tours and concerts ==
- The Expedition Tour (2019)
- The Fellowship: Map The Treasure (2020)
- The Fellowship: Beginning of the End Tour (2022)
- The Fellowship: Break The Wall Tour (2022–2023)
- Towards The Light: Will To Power Tour (2024–2025)
- In Your Fantasy Tour (2025–2026)
- Zero to All Tour (2027)
