= The World EP.Fin: Will =

- Digital cover

Studio album by Ateez
- Released: December 1, 2023
- Genre: K-pop
- Length: 39:05
- Language: Korean
- Label: KQ; RCA; Legacy

Ateez chronology
The World EP.2: Outlaw (2023)	The World EP.Fin: Will (2023)	Golden Hour: Part.1 (2024)

Singles from The World EP.Fin: Will
- 1. "Crazy Form" Released: December 1, 2023; 2. "Matz" Released: January 2, 2024; 3. "It's you" Released: January 9, 2024; 4. "Youth" Released: January 16, 2024; 5. "Everything" Released: January 23, 2024

The World EP.Fin: Will is the second Korean-language and fourth overall studio album by South Korean boy band Ateez, released on December 1, 2023, through KQ Entertainment, RCA Records and Legacy Recordings. It is the final installment in the group's The World series, following six months after The World EP.2: Outlaw. The album was released simultaneously with the single "Crazy Form" and its music video. The World EP.Fin: Will debuted at number one in South Korea and the US.

== Background ==
The group's captain Hongjoong commented that the album "wraps up [their first] five years as Ateez and previews what is to come in the following years", and pointed out that they included unit and solo songs "for the first time". Hongjoong also explained that the first choice of song for the album was "Crazy Form", with the rest of the album built around the single.

== Critical reception ==
Billboard's Jason Lipshutz wrote that "every inch of the album is filled with percussive breakdowns, rap verses springing into melodic hooks and cleanly delivered interplay between the various group members".

== Commercial performance ==
The World EP.Fin: Will sold over 910,000 copies in its first day of availability in South Korea according to the Hanteo Chart. The album debuted at number one on the Circle Album Chart, selling a combined 1.6 million copies of its two charting versions in South Korea in its first week.

The album debuted atop the US Billboard 200 with 152,000 album-equivalent units, of which 146,000 were pure album sales. It is Ateez' first number-one and fourth top-10 album in the US.

== Track listing ==
The World EP.Fin: Will track listing
No.	Title	Lyrics	Music	Length
1.	"We Know"	Eden, Ollounder, Maddox, Peperoni, Oliv, Hongjoong, Mingi	Eden, Ollounder, Maddox, Peperoni, Oliv, Alex Karlsson	3:49
2.	"Emergency"	Eden, Ollounder, Maddox, Peperoni, Oliv, Hongjoong, Mingi	Eden, Ollounder, Maddox, Peperoni, Oliv	2:58
3.	"Crazy Form" (미친 폼)	Eden, Ollounder, Maddox, Peperoni, Oliv, Hongjoong, Mingi	Eden, Ollounder, Maddox, Peperoni, Oliv	3:18
4.	"Arriba"	Eden, Ollounder, Maddox, Peperoni, Oliv, Hongjoong, Mingi	Eden, Ollounder, Maddox, Peperoni, Oliv	3:37
5.	"Silver Light"	Eden, Ollounder, Maddox, Peperoni, Oliv, Door, Hongjoong, Mingi	Eden, Ollounder, Maddox, Peperoni, Oliv, Door	3:50
6.	"Crescent Part.2"		Eden, Ollounder, Maddox, Peperoni, Oliv, Door	0:54
7.	"Dreamy Day" (꿈날)	Eden, Ollounder, Maddox, Peperoni, Oliv, Hongjoong, Mingi	Eden, Ollounder, Maddox, Hongjoong, Peperoni, Oliv	3:26
8.	"Matz" (by Hongjoong and Seonghwa)	Hongjoong, Seonghwa	Hongjoong, Peperoni, Oliv, Eden, Ollounder	3:26
9.	"It's You" (by Yeosang, San and Wooyoung)	Yeosang, San, Wooyoung, Eden, Ollounder, Maddox, Peperoni, Oliv, Door	Eden, Ollounder, Maddox, Peperoni, Oliv, Door	3:29
10.	"Youth" (by Yunho and Mingi)	Mingi, Yunho	Mingi, Long Drive, The Need, Quaimo	3:29
11.	"Everything" (by Jongho)	Jongho, Door, Eden, Maddox	Door, Eden, Maddox, Light up	3:46
12.	"Fin: Will"		Eden, Ollounder, Maddox, Peperoni, Oliv, Door	3:03
13.	"Deja Vu (Film Ver.)" (X Ver. Exclusive)		N/A	N/A
14.	"Eternal Sunshine (Outdoor Ver.)" (X Ver. Exclusive)		N/A	N/A
Total length:				39:05

== Charts ==
=== Weekly charts ===
Weekly chart performance for The World EP.Fin: Will
Chart (2023–2024)	Peak position
Austrian Albums (Ö3 Austria)	37
Belgian Albums (Ultratop Flanders)	30
Belgian Albums (Ultratop Wallonia)	25
Croatian International Albums (HDU)	5
Danish Albums (Hitlisten)	30
French Albums (SNEP)	193
German Albums (Offizielle Top 100)	11
Hungarian Albums (MAHASZ)	21
Japanese Albums (Oricon)	3
Japanese Combined Albums (Oricon)	3
Japanese Hot Albums (Billboard Japan)	3
Lithuanian Albums (AGATA)	37
Polish Albums (ZPAV)	52
Scottish Albums (OCC)	1
South Korean Albums (Circle)	1
Swedish Albums (Sverigetopplistan)	56
Swiss Albums (Schweizer Hitparade)	92
UK Albums (OCC)	2
US Billboard 200	1
US World Albums (Billboard)	1

=== Monthly charts ===
Monthly chart performance for The World EP.Fin: Will
Chart (2023)	Position
Japanese Albums (Oricon)	6
South Korean Albums (Circle)	1

=== Year-end charts ===
Year-end chart performance for The World EP.Fin: Will
Chart (2023)	Position
Japanese Albums (Oricon)	54
South Korean Albums (Circle)	21

== Accolades ==
Year-end lists
Critic/Publication	List	Work	Rank	Ref.
Billboard	The 25 Best K-Pop Albums of 2023	The World EP.Fin: Will	5	

Music program awards
Song	Program	Date	Ref.
"Crazy Form"	Show Champion (MBC M)	December 6, 2023	
"Crazy Form"	Music Bank (KBS)	December 8, 2023	
"Crazy Form"	Music Bank (KBS)	December 15, 2023	
"Crazy Form"	Music Bank (KBS)	December 22, 2023	

== Certifications ==
Certifications for The World EP.Fin: Will
Region	Certification	Certified units/sales
South Korea (KMCA)	Million	1,000,000^{^}
South Korea (KMCA) Minirecord version	Platinum	250,000^{^}
^{^} Shipments figures based on certification alone.
