= List of K-pop on the Billboard year-end charts =

Current Billboard logo

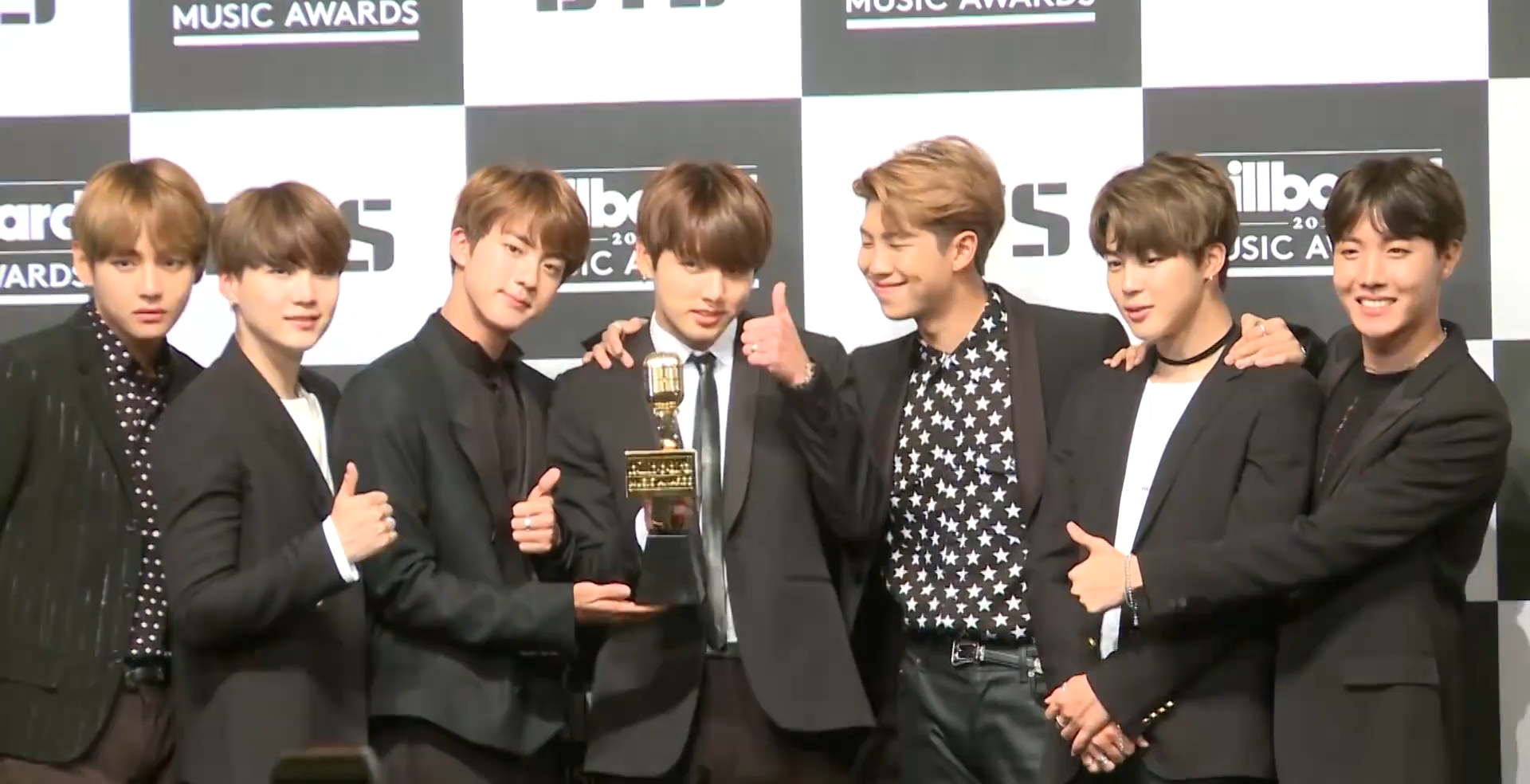
BTS at their press conference in Seoul, South Korea after winning Top Social Artist at the Billboard Music Awards on May 21, 2017.

List of K-pop on the Billboard year-end charts is a compilation of chart information for K-pop music published by the Billboard charts, and reported on by Billboard K-Town, an online Billboard column. This is a list of K-pop musicians and bands and their placement, along with their musical releases, singles, EPs and albums on the Billboard Year-End charts.

== 2009–present ==
- This list depends on continual updates taken from *Billboard artist/title/chart search and *Billboard charts.
- Charts with all updates 2009–present are marked (Complete).
- Billboard artists comprehensive update incomplete.
- Billboard charts comprehensive update incomplete.
- The list is exclusive of Korea K-Pop Hot 100 data.
- Figures in red highlight indicate the highest rating received by K-pop artists on that chart.
- – Current year's charting

=== Billboard 200 Albums (Year end) (Complete) ===
Year	Artist	Album title	Rank
2018	BTS	Love Yourself: Answer	85
2018	BTS	Love Yourself: Tear	101
2018	BTS	Love Yourself: Her	150
2019	BTS	Map of the Soul: Persona	51
2019	BTS	Love Yourself: Answer	118
2019	SuperM	SuperM	185
2020	BTS	Map of the Soul: 7	20
2020	BTS	Love Yourself: Answer	156
2020	Blackpink	The Album	189
2020	NCT 127	Neo Zone	200
2021	BTS	Be	40
2021	BTS	Map of the Soul: 7	113
2021	TXT	The Chaos Chapter: Freeze	197
2021	Blackpink	The Album	200
2022	BTS	Proof	56
2022	TXT	Minisode 2: Thursday's Child	192
2023	Stray Kids	5-Star	82
2023	TXT	The Name Chapter: Temptation	122
2023	NewJeans	Get Up	134
2023	Twice	Ready to Be	178
2023	Jimin	Face	193
2023	Seventeen	FML	195
2024	Jungkook	Golden	80
2024	Stray Kids	Rock-Star	123
2024	Stray Kids	Ate	139
2024	Enhypen	Romance: Untold	196
2024	Jimin	Muse	200
2025	KPop Demon Hunters	KPop Demon Hunters (soundtrack)	13
2025	Rosé	Rosie	112
2025	Stray Kids	Karma	128
2025	Stray Kids	Hop	157

=== Billboard 200 Artists (Year end) (Complete) ===
Year	Artist	Rank
2018	BTS	21
2019	BTS	26
2020	BTS	18
2021	BTS	29
2022	BTS	48
2022	Twice	94
2023	Stray Kids	64
2023	TXT	86
2023	NewJeans	94
2024	Stray Kids	41
2024	Jungkook	64
2024	Ateez	93
2025	Stray Kids	49
2025	Rosé	86
2025	Ateez	99

=== Billboard 200 Artists - Duo/Group (Year end) (Complete) ===
Year	Label	Rank
2018	BTS	3
2019	BTS	4
2020	BTS	1
2021	BTS	1
2022	BTS	1
2023	Stray Kids	10
2024	Stray Kids	4
2025	Stray Kids	4

=== Billboard Global 200 (Year end) (Complete) ===
- Chart started in 2021.

Year	Artist	Song title	Rank
2021	BTS	"Dynamite"	5
2021	BTS	"Butter"	12
2021	Pinkfong	"Baby Shark"	48
2021	BTS	"Permission to Dance"	71
2021	BTS	"Life Goes On"	133
2021	Coldplay & BTS	"My Universe"	154
2021	Blackpink	"How You Like That"	185
2022	Coldplay & BTS	"My Universe"	25
2022	BTS	"Butter"	38
2022	BTS	"Dynamite"	40
2022	Pinkfong	"Baby Shark"	52
2022	Blackpink	"Pink Venom"	94
2022	Charlie Puth & Jungkook	"Left and Right"	106
2022	Lisa	"Money"	157
2022	Ive	"Love Dive"	160
2022	BTS	"Permission to Dance"	175
2022	Blackpink	"Shut Down"	180
2023	Jungkook feat. Latto	"Seven"	17
2023	Fifty Fifty	"Cupid"	20
2023	NewJeans	"OMG"	41
2023	NewJeans	"Ditto"	52
2023	Jimin	"Like Crazy"	61
2023	Pinkfong	"Baby Shark"	89
2023	NewJeans	"Super Shy"	117
2023	NewJeans	"Hype Boy"	147
2023	Ive	"I Am"	152
2023	Jisoo	"Flower"	160
2023	G-Idle	"Queencard"	171
2023	Le Sserafim	"Antifragile"	182
2023	Blackpink	"Shut Down"	188
2023	NewJeans	"ETA"	197
2024	Jungkook feat. Latto	"Seven"	15
2024	The Weeknd, Jennie, Lily-Rose Depp	"One of the Girls"	19
2024	Jungkook	"Standing Next to You"	36
2024	Illit	"Magnetic"	61
2024	Jimin	"Who"	106
2024	Jungkook & Jack Harlow	"3D"	129
2024	Le Sserafim	"Perfect Night"	135
2024	Aespa	"Supernova"	139
2024	Pinkfong	"Baby Shark"	147
2024	Jimin	"Like Crazy"	154
2025	Rosé & Bruno Mars	"Apt."	1
2025	Huntrix: Ejae, Audrey Nuna & Rei Ami	"Golden"	10
2025	Jimin	"Who"	21
2025	The Weeknd, Jennie, Lily-Rose Depp	"One of the Girls"	39
2025	Jennie	"Like Jennie"	49
2025	Saja Boys: Andrew Choi, Neckwav, Danny Chung, Kevin Woo & samUIL Lee	"Soda Pop"	63
2025	Jungkook feat. Latto	"Seven"	74
2025	Saja Boys, Andrew Choi, Neckwav, Danny Chung, Kevin Woo & samUIL Lee	"Your Idol"	76
2025	Huntrix: Ejae, Audrey Nuna & Rei Ami	"How It's Done"	96
2025	Aespa	"Whiplash"	102
2025	Blackpink	"Jump"	110
2025	Huntrix: Ejae, Audrey Nuna & Rei Ami	"What It Sounds Like"	122
2025	Rumi & Jinu, Ejae, Andrew Choi & KPop Demon Hunters Cast	"Free"	133
2025	Huntrix: Ejae, Audrey Nuna & Rei Ami	"Takedown"	142
2025	Jin	"Don't Say You Love Me"	151
2025	Jennie	"Mantra"	175
2025	Rosé	"Toxic Till the End"	176
2025	Twice	"Strategy"	179

=== Billboard Global 200 Artists (Year end) (Complete) ===
- Chart started in 2021.

Year	Artist	Rank
2021	BTS	4
2021	Pinkfong	58
2021	Lisa	84
2022	BTS	10
2022	Blackpink	36
2022	Pinkfong	50
2023	NewJeans	9
2023	Jungkook	36
2023	Fifty Fifty	43
2023	Jimin	56
2023	Le Sserafim	73
2023	Ive	88
2023	Pinkfong	89
2023	Blackpink	96
2024	Jungkook	14
2024	Jimin	44
2024	Le Sserafim	46
2024	NewJeans	48
2024	Aespa	61
2024	Illit	68
2024	Jennie	88
2025	Huntrix: Ejae, Audrey Nuna & Rei Ami	14
2025	Rosé	21
2025	Jennie	28
2025	Saja Boys: Andrew Choi, Neckwav, Danny Chung, Kevin Woo & samUIL Lee	34
2025	Jimin	41

=== Billboard Global Excl. U.S. (Year end) (Complete) ===
- Chart started in 2021.

Year	Artist	Song title	Rank
2021	BTS	"Dynamite"	1
2021	BTS	"Butter"	5
2021	BTS	"Permission to Dance"	41
2021	Pinkfong	"Baby Shark"	50
2021	BTS	"Life Goes On"	68
2021	Blackpink	"How You Like That"	79
2021	BTS feat. Halsey	"Boy with Luv"	123
2021	Coldplay & BTS	"My Universe"	131
2021	Lisa	"Money"	167
2021	Lisa	"Lalisa"	176
2021	Twice	"I Can't Stop Me"	192
2022	Coldplay & BTS	"My Universe"	19
2022	BTS	"Butter"	22
2022	BTS	"Dynamite"	27
2022	Pinkfong	"Baby Shark"	50
2022	Blackpink	"Pink Venom"	64
2022	Charlie Puth & Jungkook	"Left and Right"	87
2022	BTS	"Permission to Dance"	94
2022	Ive	"Love Dive"	97
2022	Lisa	"Money"	99
2022	Twice	"The Feels"	130
2022	Blackpink	"Shut Down"	133
2022	Ive	"Eleven"	171
2022	Nayeon	"Pop!"	172
2022	BTS	"Yet to Come"	187
2022	Ive	"After Like"	190
2022	Le Sserafim	"Fearless"	191
2022	NewJeans	"Hype Boy"	194
2022	Psy feat. Suga	"That That"	198
2023	Jungkook feat. Latto	"Seven"	10
2023	Fifty Fifty	"Cupid"	20
2023	NewJeans	"Ditto"	24
2023	NewJeans	"OMG"	25
2023	Jimin	"Like Crazy"	46
2023	NewJeans	"Hype Boy"	49
2023	NewJeans	"Super Shy"	84
2023	Ive	"I Am"	86
2023	Pinkfong	"Baby Shark"	95
2023	Jisoo	"Flower"	96
2023	Le Sserafim	"Antifragile"	99
2023	Blackpink	"Shut Down"	101
2023	Blackpink	"Pink Venom"	106
2023	G-Idle	"Queencard"	111
2023	Le Sserafim	"Unforgiven"	137
2023	NewJeans	"ETA"	165
2023	BTS	"Dynamite	168
2023	Le Sserafim	"Eve, Psyche & the Bluebeard's Wife"	177
2023	Seventeen	"Super"	185
2023	Charlie Puth & Jungkook	"Left and Right"	186
2023	Jungkook	"Dreamers"	187
2024	Jungkook feat. Latto	"Seven"	7
2024	The Weeknd, Jennie, Lily-Rose Depp	"One of the Girls"	9
2024	Jungkook	"Standing Next to You"	17
2024	Illit	"Magnetic"	29
2024	Jungkook & Jack Harlow	"3D"	78
2024	Le Sserafim	"Perfect Night"	83
2024	Aespa	"Supernova"	98
2024	Jimin	"Who"	99
2024	Jimin	"Like Crazy"	112
2024	Pinkfong	"Baby Shark"	124
2024	NewJeans	"How Sweet"	146
2024	Aespa	"Drama"	158
2024	NewJeans	"Super Shy"	161
2024	BabyMonster	"Sheesh"	162
2024	Aespa	"Armageddon"	169
2024	Lisa	"Rockstar"	185
2024	Jennie	"You & Me"	189
2024	Le Sserafim	"Smart"	195
2024	Le Sserafim	"Easy"	197
2025	Rosé & Bruno Mars	"Apt."	1
2025	Huntrix: Ejae, Audrey Nuna & Rei Ami	"Golden"	9
2025	Jimin	"Who"	17
2025	Jennie	"Like Jennie"	24
2025	The Weeknd, Jennie, Lily-Rose Depp	"One of the Girls"	27
2025	Aespa	"Whiplash"	28
2025	Jungkook feat. Latto	"Seven"	45
2025	Saja Boys: Andrew Choi, Neckwav, Danny Chung, Kevin Woo & samUIL Lee	"Soda Pop"	76
2025	Blackpink	"Jump"	88
2025	Jennie	"Mantra"	101
2025	Saja Boys: Andrew Choi, Neckwav, Danny Chung, Kevin Woo & samUIL Lee	"Your Idol"	102
2025	Jin	"Don't Say You Love Me"	116
2025	Huntrix: Ejae, Audrey Nuna & Rei Ami	"How It's Done"	117
2025	Rosé	"Toxic Till the End"	125
2025	Babymonster	"Drip"	126
2025	Huntrix: Ejae, Audrey Nuna & Rei Ami	"What It Sounds Like"	137
2025	G-Dragon feat. Taeyang & Daesung	"Home Sweet Home"	146
2025	Rumi & Jinu, Ejae, Andrew Choi & KPop Demon Hunters Cast	"Free"	149
2025	Huntrix: Ejae, Audrey Nuna & Rei Ami	"Takedown"	158
2025	J-Hope & GloRilla	"Killin' It Girl"	162
2025	Twice	"Strategy"	167

=== Billboard Global Excl. U.S. Artists (Year end) (Complete) ===
- Chart started in 2021.

Year	Artist	Rank
2021	BTS	1
2021	Blackpink	36
2021	Pinkfong	56
2021	Lisa	61
2021	Twice	63
2022	BTS	6
2022	Blackpink	25
2022	Ive	34
2022	Pinkfong	55
2022	Twice	61
2022	Lisa	75
2022	NewJeans	80
2023	NewJeans	4
2023	Jungkook	24
2023	Le Sserafim	33
2023	Fifty Fifty	34
2023	Blackpink	37
2023	Jimin	40
2023	BTS	62
2023	V	84
2023	G-Idle	85
2023	Jisoo	89
2023	Pinkfong	92
2024	Jungkook	8
2024	NewJeans	13
2024	Le Sserafim	26
2024	Jimin	28
2024	Aespa	29
2024	Illit	48
2024	Jennie	61
2024	Babymonster	84
2024	Lisa	97
2024	Pinkfong	99
2025	Rosé	11
2025	Huntrix: Ejae, Audrey Nuna & Rei Ami	12
2025	Jennie	19
2025	Aespa	28
2025	Saja Boys: Andrew Choi, Neckwav, Danny Chung, Kevin Woo & samUIL Lee	33
2025	Jimin	37
2025	Jin	42
2025	Jungkook	69
2025	Blackpink	75
2025	Babymonster	93
2025	J-Hope	94
2025	Lisa	97
2025	Twice	99

=== Billboard Twitter Top Tracks (Year end) (Complete) ===
- Chart started 2014-12-31 and discontinued after 2017-12-31.

Year	Artist	Song title	Rank
2014	Psy feat. Snoop Dogg	"Hangover"	48
2016	BTS	"Fire"	26
2016	BTS	"Save Me"	36

=== Boxscore Charts – Top 40 Tours (Year end) ===
Year	Artist	Gross	Total Attendees	No. of Shows	Rank
2019	BTS	$196,414,822	1,611,963	42	3
2022	BTS	$75,489,240	458,144	11	27
2023	Blackpink	$148,300,000	703,0000	29	10
2023	Suga	$57,100,000	318,000	26	37
2024	Seventeen	$98,400,000	865,000	24	31
2025	Stray Kids	$185,700,000	1,300,000	31	10
2025	Seventeen	$142,400,000	964,000	34	17
2025	J-Hope	$79,900,000	504,000	33	32
2025	Enhypen	$76,100,000	556,000	25	37

=== Boxscore Charts – Top K-Pop Tours (Year end) ===
Year	Artist	Gross	Total Attendees	No. of Shows (Note: The number of shows reflects performances reported to Billboard Boxscore within the applicable tracking period and therefore does not necessarily represent every show performed during an artist's complete tour.)	Rank
2023 (Note: The 2023 ranking covers reported shows worldwide from November 1, 2022, through September 30, 2023.)	Blackpink	$148,300,000	703,000	29	1
2023	Suga	$57,100,000	318,000	26	2
2023	Twice	$54,200,000	345,000	18	3
2023	TXT	$46,800,000	379,000	27	4
2023	Seventeen	$43,300,000	440,000	12	5
2023	Enhypen	$33,000,000	336,000	19	6
2023	Stray Kids	$16,100,000	114,000	8	7
2023	Ateez	$13,900,000	103,000	10	8
2023	Le Sserafim	$7,900,000	77,500	9	9
2023	NCT Dream	$7,000,000	36,900	4	10
2024 (Note: The 2024 ranking covers reported shows worldwide from October 1, 2023, through September 30, 2024.)	Seventeen	$98,400,000	865,000	24	1
2024	Enhypen	$63,000,000	407,000	36	2
2024	TXT	$58,100,000	453,000	26	3
2024	Ateez	$37,600,000	192,000	13	4
2024	Twice	$24,200,000	220,000	5	5
2024	IU	$16,600,000	92,600	8	6
2024	Ive	$10,800,000	92,900	10	7
2024	NCT Dream	$7,800,000	59,800	8	8
2024	(G)I-dle	$6,700,000	46,500	6	9
2024	Itzy	$6,000,000	56,200	8	10
2025 (Note: The 2025 ranking covers reported shows worldwide from October 1, 2024, through September 30, 2025.)	Stray Kids	$185,700,000	1,300,000	31	1
2025	Seventeen	$142,400,000	964,000	34	2
2025	J-Hope	$79,900,000	504,000	33	3
2025	Enhypen	$76,100,000	556,000	25	4
2025	Ateez	$70,000,000	400,000	28	5
2025	TXT	$64,300,000	485,000	39	6
2025	Jin	$46,100,000	287,000	18	7
2025	Le Sserafim	$34,100,000	237,000	27	8
2025	G-Dragon	$27,100,000	117,000	9	9
2025	Aespa	$18,000,000	138,000	15	10

=== Boxscore Charts – Top 25 Boxscores (Year end) ===
Year	Event date	Artist	Venue	City	Gross	Total Attendees	Promoter	No. of Shows	Rank
2019	May 4 & 5	BTS	Rose Bowl	Pasadena	$16,695,461	113,040	Live Nation	2	6
2019	April 6 & 7	BTS	Rajamangala Stadium	Bangkok	$15,070,360	68,900	Live Nation	2	10
2019	May 18 & 19	BTS	MetLife Stadium	East Rutherford	$14,195,198	98,574	Live Nation	2	12
2019	June 7 & 8	BTS	Stade de France	Paris	$13,928,011	107,328	Live Nation	2	13
2019	June 1 & 2	BTS	Wembley Stadium	Wembley	$13,681,565	114,583	Live Nation	2	14
2019	May 11 & 12	BTS	Soldier Field	Near South Side, Chicago	$13,483,307	88,156	Live Nation	2	16
2019	Oct. 26–27, 29	BTS	Seoul Olympic Stadium	Seoul	$12,109,026	129,268	Big Hit Entertainment	3	25
2022	Apr. 8-9, 15-16	BTS	Allegiant Stadium	Las Vegas	$35,944,850	199,697	Hybe Corporation	4	3
2022	Nov. 27-28, Dec. 1-2	BTS	SoFi Stadium	Inglewood, California	$33,316,345	213,751	Hybe Corporation	4	5

=== Boxscore Charts – Top Promoters (Year end) ===
Year	Promoter	Total Gross	Total Attendees	No. of Shows	Rank
2022	Hybe Corporation	$124,470,539	855,625	60	8
2023	Hybe Corporation	$188,100,000	1,600,000	93	5
2024	Hybe Corporation	$220,000,000	1,700,000	87	9
2025	Hybe Corporation	$469,200,000	3,300,000	213	4

=== Dance/Electronic Digital Song Sales (Year end) (Complete) ===
Year	Artist	Song title	Rank
2018	Steve Aoki feat. BTS	"Waste It on Me"	38
2019	Steve Aoki feat. BTS	"Waste It on Me"	46
2020	Lady Gaga and Blackpink	"Sour Candy"	21
2021	DJ Snake, Ozuna, Megan Thee Stallion and Lisa	"SG"	48
2023	Peggy Gou	"(It Goes Like) Nanana"	23
2024	Jungkook & DJ Snake	"Please Don't Change"	21
2024	Jungkook & Major Lazer	"Closer to You"	22
2025	HUNTR/X: Ejae, Audrey Nuna & Rei Ami	"How It's Done"	4
2025	HUNTR/X: Ejae, Audrey Nuna & Rei Ami	"Takedown"	7
2025	Blackpink	"Jump"	14
2025	Stray Kids	"Ceremony"	20

=== Digital Song Sales (Year end) (Complete) ===
Year	Artist	Song title	Rank
2020	BTS	"Dynamite"	1
2020	BTS	"On"	44
2021	BTS	"Butter"	1
2021	BTS	"Dynamite"	2
2021	BTS	"Permission to Dance"	5
2021	Coldplay & BTS	"My Universe"	10
2021	BTS	"Life Goes On"	13
2021	BTS	"Blue & Grey"	40
2021	BTS	"Stay"	54
2022	Benny Blanco, BTS & Snoop Dogg	"Bad Decisions"	26
2022	Charlie Puth & Jungkook	"Left and Right"	30
2022	Coldplay & BTS	"My Universe"	47
2022	BTS	"Yet to Come"	48
2022	Jin	"The Astronaut"	58
2022	Juice Wrld & Suga	"Girl of My Dreams"	61
2023	Jimin	"Like Crazy"	5
2023	Jungkook feat. Latto	"Seven"	8
2023	Jimin	"Set Me Free Pt. 2"	29
2023	Jungkook & Jack Harlow	"3D"	31
2023	J-Hope with J. Cole	"On the Street"	49
2023	BTS	"Take Two"	62
2023	RM with Youjeen	"Wild Flower"	66
2023	Agust D	"Haegeum"	72
2024	Jungkook	"Standing Next to You"	5
2024	Jimin	"Who"	9
2025	Rosé & Bruno Mars	"APT."	5
2025	HUNTR/X: Ejae, Audrey Nuna & Rei Ami	"Golden"	11
2025	Saja Boys: Andrew Choi, Neckwav, Danny Chung, Kevin Woo & samUIL Lee	"Soda Pop"	25

=== Digital Song Sales Artists (Year end) (Complete) ===
Year	Artist	Rank
2020	BTS	1
2021	BTS	1
2022	BTS	11
2023	Jimin	6
2023	Jungkook	10
2024	Jungkook	3
2024	Jimin	15
2025	Huntrix: Ejae, Audrey Nuna & Rei Ami	10

=== Digital Song Sales Imprints (Year end) (Complete) ===
Year	Label	Rank
2020	Big Hit Entertainment	1
2021	HYBE	1
2021	Big Hit Entertainment	3
2023	Big Hit Entertainment	4

=== Digital Song Sales Labels (Year end) (Complete) ===
Year	Label	Rank
2020	Big Hit Entertainment	4
2021	Big Hit Entertainment	1

=== Google's Top Hummed Songs 2020 (presented by Google) (Year end) (Complete) ===
- Chart only for the year 2020

Year	Artist	Song title	Rank
2020	BTS	"Dynamite"	13
2020	Pinkfong	"Baby Shark"	25
2020	Blackpink	"How You Like That"	47

=== Hot 100 Artists (Year end) (Complete) ===
Year	Artist	Rank
2012	Psy	51
2013	Psy	35
2019	Pinkfong	76
2020	BTS	42
2021	BTS	8
2023	Fifty Fifty	50
2023	Jungkook	90
2023	NewJeans	100
2024	Jungkook	81
2024	Jimin	89
2025	Huntrix: Ejae, Audrey Nuna & Rei Ami	26
2025	Saja Boys: Andrew Choi, Neckwav, Danny Chung, Kevin Woo & samUIL Lee	28
2025	Rosé	37
2025	Jimin	53

=== Hot 100 Artists - Duo/Group (Year end) (Complete) ===
Year	Label	Rank
2020	BTS	3
2021	BTS	1
2022	BTS	8
2023	Fifty Fifty	3
2023	NewJeans	7
2025	HUNTR/X: Ejae, Audrey Nuna & Rei Ami	1
2025	Saja Boys: Andrew Choi, Neckwav, Danny Chung, Kevin Woo & samUIL Lee	2
2025	Twice	9

=== Hot 100 Songs (Year end) (Complete) ===
Year	Artist	Song title	Rank
2012	Psy	"Gangnam Style"	47
2013	Psy	"Gangnam Style"	55
2019	Pinkfong	"Baby Shark"	75
2020	BTS	"Dynamite"	38
2021	BTS	"Butter"	11
2021	BTS	"Dynamite"	41
2023	Fifty Fifty	"Cupid"	44
2023	Jungkook feat. Latto	"Seven"	82
2025	Rosé & Bruno Mars	"APT."	9
2025	HUNTR/X: Ejae, Audrey Nuna & Rei Ami	"Golden"	25
2025	Saja Boys: Andrew Choi, Neckwav, Danny Chung, Kevin Woo & samUIL Lee	"Your Idol"	54
2025	Jimin	"Who"	57
2025	Saja Boys: Andrew Choi, Neckwav, Danny Chung, Kevin Woo & samUIL Lee	"Soda Pop"	61
2025	HUNTR/X: Ejae, Audrey Nuna & Rei Ami	"How It's Done"	68
2025	HUNTR/X: Ejae, Audrey Nuna & Rei Ami	"What It Sounds Like"	83
2025	HUNTR/X: Ejae, Audrey Nuna & Rei Ami	"Takedown"	93

=== Hot Dance/Electronic Songs (Year end) (Complete) ===
Year	Artist	Song title	Rank
2018	Steve Aoki feat. BTS	"Waste It on Me"	68
2019	Steve Aoki feat. BTS	"Waste It on Me"	33
2020	Lady Gaga and Blackpink	"Sour Candy"	16
2021	Alesso with Corsak and Stray Kids	"Going Dumb"	46
2021	DJ Snake, Ozuna, Megan Thee Stallion and Lisa	"SG"	93
2022	DJ Snake, Ozuna, Megan Thee Stallion and Lisa	"SG"	31
2023	Peggy Gou	"(It Goes Like) Nanana"	20
2024	Peggy Gou	"(It Goes Like) Nanana"	89

=== Hot Singles Sales (Year end) (Complete) ===
- Chart started 2006-12-31 and discontinued.

Year	Artist	Song title	Rank
2009	Wonder Girls	"Nobody"	1
2010	Wonder Girls	"Nobody"	31

=== Independent Albums (Year end) (Complete) ===
Year	Artist	Album title	Rank
2018	BTS	Love Yourself: Tear	3
2018	BTS	Love Yourself: Answer	4
2018	BTS	Love Yourself: Her	9
2019	BTS	Map of the Soul: Persona	1
2019	BTS	Love Yourself: Answer	4
2019	BTS	Love Yourself: Tear	6
2019	BTS	BTS World: Original Soundtrack	9
2019	BTS	Love Yourself: Her	17
2019	NCT 127	We Are Superhuman	24
2019	Pinkfong	Pinkfong Presents: The Best Of Baby Shark	33
2019	Exo	Don't Mess Up My Tempo	45
2020	BTS	Map of the Soul: 7	2
2020	BTS	Love Yourself: Answer	13
2020	NCT 127	Neo Zone	20
2020	Pinkfong	Pinkfong Presents: The Best Of Baby Shark	39
2020	SuperM	Super One	43
2021	BTS	Be	5
2021	BTS	Map of the Soul: 7	11
2022	NCT 127	Sticker	49

=== Independent Artists (Year end) (Complete) ===
Year	Artist	Rank
2018	BTS	1
2019	BTS	1
2020	BTS	2
2021	BTS	3

=== Independent Imprints (Year end) (Complete) ===
Year	Label	Rank
2019	Big Hit Entertainment	1
2020	Big Hit Entertainment	2
2020	SM Entertainment	7
2021	Big Hit Entertainment	3

=== Independent Labels (Year end) (Complete) ===
Year	Label	Rank
2018	Big Hit Entertainment	3
2018	LOEN Entertainment	10
2019	Big Hit Entertainment	1
2020	Big Hit Entertainment	3
2021	Big Hit Entertainment	4
2022	Big Hit Entertainment	3

=== Internet Albums (Year end) (Complete) ===
- Chart discontinued 2020.

Year	Artist	Album title	Rank
2018	BTS	Love Yourself: Answer	24
2019	SuperM	SuperM	11
2019	BTS	Map of the Soul: Persona	19

=== Japan Hot 100 (Year end) (Complete) ===
- Chart started 2008-12-31

Year	Artist	Song title	Rank
2010	Girls' Generation/Shojo Jidai	"Gee"	57
2010	Kara	"Mister"	82
2011	Kara	"Go Go Summer!"	8
2011	Girls' Generation/Shojo Jidai	"Mr. Taxi"	11
2011	Kara	"Jet Coaster Love"	12
2011	Girl's Generation/Shojo Jidai	"Gee"	23
2011	TVXQ/Tohoshinki	"Why? (Keep Your Head Down)"	30
2011	Kara	"Winter Magic"	53
2011	Jang Keun-suk	"Let Me Cry"	64
2011	T-ara	"Bo Peep Bo Peep"	86
2012	Girls' Generation/Shojo Jidai	"Paparazzi"	50
2014	TVXQ/Tohoshinki	"Time Works Wonders"	8
2014	TVXQ/Tohoshinki	"Sweat"	40
2015	TVXQ/Tohoshinki	"Sakuramichi"	15
2016	BigBang	"Bang Bang Bang"	28
2016	BigBang	"Fantastic Baby"	37
2017	Twice	"TT"	6
2017	Twice	"Signal"	23
2017	BTS	"Blood Sweat & Tears" (Japanese version)	27
2017	Twice	"One More Time"	31
2017	Twice	"Like Ooh-Ahh"	56
2017	Twice	"Knock Knock"	60
2017	Twice	"Cheer Up"	71
2017	BigBang	"Bang Bang Bang"	95
2018	Twice	"Candy Pop"	8
2018	BTS	"Fake Love"	13
2018	Twice	"Wake Me Up"	18
2018	Twice	"TT"	19
2018	BTS	"DNA"	24
2018	BTS feat. Desiigner	"Mic Drop" remix	28
2018	Twice	""What Is Love?"	29
2018	Twice	"Likey"	30
2018	Twice	"Heart Shaker"	41
2018	Blackpink	"Ddu-Du Ddu-Du"	57
2018	TVXQ/Tohoshinki	"Reboot"	59
2018	Momoland	"Bboom Bboom	62
2018	Twice	"BDZ"	75
2018	Jaejoong	"Sign"	76
2018	Twice	"One More Time"	86
2018	Twice	"Dance the Night Away"	90
2018	Twice	"I Want You Back" cover	95
2018	BTS	"Don't Leave Me"	96
2019	BTS	"Lights"	18
2019	Twice	"Breakthrough"	28
2019	Twice	"Fancy"	34
2019	Twice	"Yes or Yes"	35
2019	Twice	"Happy Happy"	39
2019	BTS feat. Halsey	"Boy with Luv"	46
2019	Blackpink	"Kill This Love"	60
2019	Iz*One	"Suki to Iwasetai"	69
2019	Twice	"What Is Love?"	79
2019	Iz*One	"Vampire"	84
2019	BTS	"Idol"	92
2019	Iz*One	"Buenos Aires"	93
2019	BTS	"Fake Love"	96
2020	BTS	"Dynamite"	18
2020	Twice	"Feel Special"	31
2020	Twice	"Fanfare"	41
2020	BTS	"Stay Gold"	56
2020	Twice	"More & More"	68
2020	BTS feat. Halsey	"Boy with Luv"	69
2020	Blackpink	"How You Like That"	72
2020	Seventeen	"Fallin' Flower"	77
2020	Twice	"Fancy"	78
2020	Mamamoo	"Hip"	81
2020	BTS	"On"	84
2020	Itzy	"Wannabe"	88
2021	BTS	"Dynamite"	2
2021	BTS	"Butter"	6
2021	BTS	"Life Goes On"	61
2021	BTS	"Stay Gold"	66
2021	Twice	"I Can't Stop Me"	71
2021	BTS feat. Halsey	"Boy with Luv"	81
2022	BTS	"Butter"	12
2022	BTS	"Dynamite"	14
2022	BTS	"Permission to Dance"	23
2022	Twice	"The Feels"	38
2022	Ive	"Eleven"	44
2022	Kep1er	"Wa Da Da"	46
2022	Ive	"Love Dive"	69
2022	Nayeon	"Pop!"	76
2023	NewJeans	"Ditto"	26
2023	Jungkook feat. Latto	"Seven"	29
2023	NewJeans	"OMG"	31
2023	Le Sserafim	"Antifragile"	46
2023	NewJeans	"Hype Boy"	68
2023	Stray Kids	"Case 143"	83
2023	BTS	"Dynamite"	83
2023	Le Sserafim feat. Nile Rodgers	"Unforgiven"	95
2023	Ive	"I Am"	98
2024	Illit	"Magnetic"	15
2024	Le Sserafim	"Perfect Night"	36
2024	Jungkook feat. Latto	"Seven"	39
2024	NewJeans	"Ditto"	61
2024	NewJeans	"OMG"	77
2024	Aespa	"Supernova"	99
2025	Rosé and Bruno Mars	"Apt."	3
2025	Aespa	"Whiplash"	30
2025	Babymonster	"Drip"	63
2025	Jimin	"Who"	73
2025	Illit	"Almond Chocolate"	77
2025	Huntrix	"Golden"	81
2025	Illit	"Magnetic"	91

=== On-Demand Songs (On-Demand Streaming Songs) (Year end) (Complete) ===
- Chart not up yet or discontinued in 2021.

Year	Artist	Song title	Rank
2020	BTS	"Dynamite"	50

=== Radio Songs (Year end) (Complete) ===
Year	Artist	Song title	Rank
2021	BTS	"Butter"	69
2023	Fifty Fifty	"Cupid"	68
2025	Rosé & Bruno Mars	"APT."	12

=== Social 50 (Year end) (Complete) ===
- Chart halted from 2020-12-26 to present while under revisions.

Year	Artist	Ranking
2012	Psy	15
2013	Psy	18
2016	BTS	34
2017	BTS	1
2017	Exo	35
2017	Seventeen	41
2018	BTS	1
2018	Exo	2
2018	Got7	6
2018	NCT	9
2018	Monsta X	11
2018	Seventeen	12
2018	Wanna One	14
2018	NCT 127	23
2018	Blackpink	28
2018	Twice	33
2018	Stray Kids	41
2018	NCT Dream	43
2018	Shinee	46
2019	BTS	1
2019	Exo	2
2019	Got7	4
2019	Seventeen	6
2019	NCT 127	7
2019	Monsta X	8
2019	Blackpink	9
2019	TXT	12
2019	NCT Dream	14
2019	Twice	16
2019	NCT	20
2019	Stray Kids	23
2019	Baekhyun	24
2019	X1	29
2019	Ateez	30
2019	Wanna One	32
2019	Astro	34
2019	SuperM	36
2019	Red Velvet	37
2019	NU'EST	45
2020	BTS	1
2020	Exo	2
2020	NCT 127	3
2020	Seventeen	5
2020	TXT	7
2020	Ateez	8
2020	Blackpink	9
2020	Monsta X	11
2020	Got7	12
2020	Stray Kids	13
2020	NCT Dream	14
2020	Twice	17
2020	NCT	18
2020	The Boyz	19
2020	Baekhyun	21
2020	Treasure	22
2020	SuperM	26
2020	Red Velvet	32
2020	Iz*One	39
2020	Astro	40
2020	Mamamoo	45
2020	Jackson Wang	46

=== Streaming Songs (Year end) (Complete) ===
- Chart started 2013-12-31.

Year	Artist	Song title	Rank
2013	Psy	"Gangnam Style"	2
2013	Psy	"Gentleman"	24
2014	Psy	"Gangnam Style"	14
2015	Psy	"Gangnam Style"	24
2019	Pinkfong	"Baby Shark"	9
2021	BTS	"Butter"	65
2023	Fifty Fifty	"Cupid"	42
2024	Jimin	"Who"	74
2025	Rosé & Bruno Mars	"APT."	12
2025	HUNTR/X: Ejae, Audrey Nuna & Rei Ami	"Golden"	18
2025	Jimin	"Who"	29
2025	Saja Boys: Andrew Choi, Neckwav, Danny Chung, Kevin Woo & samUIL Lee	"Your Idol"	31
2025	Saja Boys: Andrew Choi, Neckwav, Danny Chung, Kevin Woo & samUIL Lee	"Soda Pop"	37
2025	HUNTR/X: Ejae, Audrey Nuna & Rei Ami	"How It's Done"	41
2025	HUNTR/X: Ejae, Audrey Nuna & Rei Ami	"What It Sounds Like"	53
2025	Rumi & Jinu, Ejae, Andrew Choi & KPop Demon Hunters Cast	"Free"	54
2025	HUNTR/X: Ejae, Audrey Nuna & Rei Ami	"Takedown"	59
2025	Jin	"Don't Say You Love Me"	69

=== Streaming Songs Artists (Year end) (Complete) ===
- Chart started 2013-12-31.

Year	Artist	Rank
2013	Psy	2
2014	Psy	15
2015	Psy	25
2019	Pinkfong	13

=== Tastemakers Albums (Year end) (Complete) ===
Year	Artist	Song title	Rank
2020	BTS	Map of the Soul: 7	2
2020	NCT 127	Neo Zone	14
2020	SuperM	Super One	23
2021	TXT	The Chaos Chapter: Freeze	16
2021	BTS	Be	25
2022	Blackpink	Born Pink	21
2024	Stray Kids	Rock-Star	24

=== Top Album Sales (Year end) (Complete) ===
- Chart started 2015.

Year	Artist	Album title	Rank
2018	BTS	Love Yourself: Tear	28
2018	BTS	Love Yourself: Answer	33
2019	BTS	Map of the Soul: Persona	6
2020	BTS	Map of the Soul: 7	3
2020	NCT 127	Neo Zone	13
2020	SuperM	Super One	30
2020	Blackpink	The Album	34
2020	BTS	Map of the Soul: Persona	39
2020	SuperM	SuperM	57
2020	BTS	Love Yourself: Answer	82
2020	Monsta X	All About Luv	84
2020	NCT	NCT 2020 Resonance Pt. 1	91
2021	BTS	Be	3
2021	BTS	Map of the Soul: 7	18
2021	TXT	The Chaos Chapter: Freeze	23
2021	NCT	NCT 2020 Resonance Pt. 1	27
2021	Blackpink	The Album	30
2021	NCT 127	Sticker	48
2021	BTS	Map of the Soul: Persona	63
2021	Twice	Taste of Love	82
2021	BTS	Love Yourself: Tear	89
2022	BTS	Proof	6
2022	TXT	Minisode 2: Thursday's Child	14
2022	Twice	Between 1&2	21
2022	Stray Kids	Oddinary	22
2022	Twice	Formula of Love: O+T=<3	26
2022	NCT 127	Sticker	33
2022	Stray Kids	Maxident	34
2022	Enhypen	Manifesto: Day 1	46
2022	Seventeen	Face the Sun	49
2022	Blackpink	Born Pink	51
2022	Nayeon	Im Nayeon	55
2022	NCT	Universe	56
2022	NCT 127	2 Baddies	59
2022	Aespa	Girls	65
2022	Itzy	Checkmate	74
2022	Seventeen	Sector 17	80
2022	Ateez	The World EP.1: Movement	94
2022	BTS	Map of the Soul: 7	97
2022	Monsta X	The Dreaming	98
2023	Stray Kids	5-Star	4
2023	TXT	The Name Chapter: Temptation	5
2023	Twice	Ready to Be	7
2023	Seventeen	FML	11
2023	NewJeans	Get Up	12
2023	Agust D	D-Day	22
2023	Enhypen	Dark Blood	24
2023	Jimin	Face	25
2023	Ateez	The World EP.2: Outlaw	30
2023	RM	Indigo	32
2023	V	Layover	44
2023	Stray Kids	Maxident	47
2023	Le Sserafim	Unforgiven	51
2023	J-Hope	Jack in the Box	66
2023	Ateez	Spin Off: From the Witness	67
2023	Aespa	My World	68
2023	NCT 127	2 Baddies	77
2023	NCT 127	Ay-Yo	85
2023	Jihyo	Zone	91
2023	NCT Dream	ISTJ	93
2023	Enhypen	Manifesto: Day 1	95
2024	Stray Kids	Rock-Star	4
2024	Stray Kids	Ate	9
2024	Jungkook	Golden	10
2024	Ateez	The World EP.Fin: Will	17
2024	Enhypen	Orange Blood	18
2024	Ateez	Golden Hour: Part.1	19
2024	Enhypen	Romance: Untold	20
2024	TXT	The Name Chapter: Freefall	22
2024	TXT	Minisode 3: Tomorrow	25
2024	Seventeen	Seventeenth Heaven	27
2024	Twice	With You-th	30
2024	NewJeans	Get Up	50
2025	Stray Kids	Karma	5
2025	Stray Kids	合 (HOP)	7
2025	Ateez	Golden Hour: Part.2	14
2025	Ateez	Golden Hour: Part.3	21
2025	Enhypen	Desire: Unleash	22
2025	Enhypen	Romance: Untold	25
2025	Twice	Strategy	27
2025	Soundtrack	KPop Demon Hunters	28
2025	TXT	The Star Chapter: Sanctuary	32
2025	Twice	This Is For	36
2025	TXT	The Star Chapter: Together	37
2025	Seventeen	Spill the Feels	38
2025	Rosé	Rosie	41

=== Top Album Sales Artists (Year end) (Complete) ===
- Charts available 2002-2005 and 2015–present.

Year	Artist	Rank
2018	BTS	4
2019	BTS	3
2020	BTS	2
2020	NCT 127	13
2020	SuperM	15
2021	BTS	2
2021	TXT	17
2022	BTS	5
2022	Twice	9
2022	Stray Kids	11
2022	TXT	16
2022	NCT 127	17
2022	Seventeen	18
2023	Stray Kids	2
2023	TXT	7
2023	Twice	10
2023	NewJeans	15
2023	Seventeen	16
2023	Enhypen	17
2023	Ateez	19
2023	Agust D	21
2023	Jimin	25
2024	Stray Kids	2
2024	Ateez	4
2024	Enhypen	5
2024	TXT	7
2024	Jungkook	9
2024	Seventeen	10
2024	Twice	20
2025	Stray Kids	2
2025	Ateez	7
2025	Enhypen	9
2025	Twice	11
2025	TXT	13
2025	Seventeen	19

|}

=== Top Album Sales Labels (Year end) (Complete) ===
Year	Label	Rank
2020	Big Hit Entertainment	7
2021	Big Hit Entertainment	8

=== Top Artists (Year end) (Complete) ===
Year	Artist	Rank
2012	Psy	56
2013	Psy	42
2017	BTS	10
2018	BTS	8
2018	Exo	76
2019	BTS	15
2020	BTS	18
2021	BTS	12
2022	BTS	54
2023	Fifty Fifty	75
2023	NewJeans	86
2024	Jungkook	60
2024	Stray Kids	73
2025	HUNTR/X: Ejae, Audrey Nuna & Rei Ami	24
2025	Rosé	44
2025	Saja Boys: Andrew Choi, Neckwav, Danny Chung, Kevin Woo & samUIL Lee	57
2025	Stray Kids	69
2025	Jimin	81

=== Top Artists - Duo/Group (Year end) (Complete) ===
Year	Label	Rank
2017	BTS	2
2018	BTS	2
2019	BTS	2
2020	BTS	1
2021	BTS	1
2022	BTS	3
2023	Fifty Fifty	6
2023	NewJeans	8
2024	Stray Kids	4
2025	HUNTR/X: Ejae, Audrey Nuna & Rei Ami	1
2025	Saja Boys: Andrew Choi, Neckwav, Danny Chung, Kevin Woo & samUIL Lee	4
2025	Stray Kids	7

=== Top Current Albums (Year end) ===
Year	Artist	Album title	Rank
2018	BTS	Love Yourself: Tear	29
2018	BTS	Love Yourself: Answer	31
2018	BTS	Love Yourself: Her	87
2019	BTS	Map of the Soul: Persona	6
2019	SuperM	SuperM	16
2019	BTS	Love Yourself: Answer	43
2019	BTS	Love Yourself: Tear	51
2019	BTS	BTS World: Original Soundtrack	96
2019	BTS	Love Yourself: Her	132
2019	NCT 127	We Are Superhuman	167
2020	BTS	Map of the Soul: 7	3
2020	NCT 127	Neo Zone	13
2020	SuperM	Super One	24
2020	Blackpink	The Album	30
2020	BTS	Map of the Soul: Persona	36
2020	Monsta X	All About Luv	53
2020	NCT	NCT 2020 Resonance Pt. 1	71
2020	BTS	Map of the Soul: 7 - The Journey	81
2020	BTS	BTS World: Original Soundtrack	106
2020	BTS	Love Yourself: Answer	167
2020	Exo	Obsession	169
2020	Pinkfong	Pinkfong Presents: The Best of Baby Shark	178
2021	BTS	Be	3
2021	TXT	The Chaos Chapter: Freeze	14
2021	NCT	NCT 2020 Resonance Pt. 1	15
2021	BTS	Map of the Soul: 7	17
2021	Blackpink	The Album	18
2021	NCT 127	Sticker	31
2021	SuperM	Super One	52
2021	Twice	Taste of Love	55
2021	Seventeen	Your Choice	66
2021	TXT	Minisode1: Blue Hour	74
2021	Enhypen	Dimension: Dilemma	86
2021	NCT 127	Neo Zone	97
2021	Twice	Eyes Wide Open	100
2022	BTS	Proof	6
2022	TXT	Minisode 2: Thursday's Child	11
2022	Stray Kids	Oddinary	15
2022	Twice	Between 1&2	16
2022	NCT 127	Sticker	19
2022	Twice	Formula of Love: O+T=<3	22
2022	Stray Kids	Maxident	26
2022	Seventeen	Face the Sun	30
2022	Enhypen	Manifesto: Day 1	31
2022	Blackpink	Born Pink	34
2022	Nayeon	Im Nayeon	36
2022	NCT	Universe	38
2022	NCT 127	2 Baddies	40
2022	Aespa	Girls	44
2022	Seventeen	Attacca	48
2022	Itzy	Checkmate	49
2022	Seventeen	Sector 17	54
2022	Ateez	The World EP.1: Movement	65
2022	Monsta X	The Dreaming	67
2022	Enhypen	Dimension: Answer	85
2022	BTS	Be	88
2022	TXT	The Chaos Chapter: Freeze	89
2023	Stray Kids	5-Star	4
2023	TXT	The Name Chapter: Temptation	5
2023	Twice	Ready to Be	7
2023	Seventeen	FML	9
2023	NewJeans	Get Up	10
2023	Agust D	D-Day	17
2023	Jimin	Face	18
2023	Enhypen	Dark Blood	19
2023	Ateez	The World EP.2: Outlaw	20
2023	RM	Indigo	21
2023	Stray Kids	Maxident	24
2023	V	Layover	30
2023	Le Sserafim	Unforgiven	34
2023	Ateez	Spin Off: From the Witness	41
2023	Aespa	My World	45
2023	J-Hope	Jack in the Box	49
2023	NCT 127	2 Baddies	51
2023	NCT 127	Ay-Yo	54
2023	Twice	Between 1&2	61
2023	Enhypen	Manifesto: Day 1	64
2023	Jihyo	Zone	66
2023	NCT Dream	ISTJ	68
2023	Itzy	Cheshire	69
2023	Blackpink	Born Pink	77
2023	BTS	Proof	84
2023	(G)I-dle	I Feel	95
2023	Itzy	Kill My Doubt	97
2024	Stray Kids	Rock-Star	4
2024	Stray Kids	Ate	8
2024	Jungkook	Golden	9
2024	Ateez	The World EP.Fin: Will	15
2024	Enhypen	Orange Blood	16
2024	Ateez	Golden Hour: Part.1	18
2024	Enhypen	Romance: Untold	20
2024	TXT	The Name Chapter: Freefall	21
2024	TXT	Minisode 3: Tomorrow	22
2024	Seventeen	Seventeenth Heaven	24
2024	Twice	With You-th	29
2024	Seventeen	17 Is Right Here	39
2024	NewJeans	Get Up	40
2024	Jimin	Muse	46
2024	Le Sserafim	Easy	48
2025	Stray Kids	Karma	5
2025	Stray Kids	Hop	6
2025	Ateez	Golden Hour: Part.2	14
2025	Ateez	Golden Hour: Part.3	18
2025	Enhypen	Desire: Unleash	20
2025	Enhypen	Romance: Untold	21
2025	TXT	The Star Chapter: Sanctuary	25
2025	Twice	Strategy	26
2025	KPop Demon Hunters	KPop Demon Hunters	27
2025	Seventeen	Spill the Feels	31
2025	Rosé	Rosie	34
2025	Twice	This Is For	36
2025	TXT	The Star Chapter: Together	38
2025	Katseye	Beautiful Chaos	40
2025	Seventeen	Happy Burstday	48
2025	Jin	Happy	50

=== Top New Artists (Year end) (Complete) ===
Year	Label	Rank
2012	Psy	7

=== World Albums (Year end) (Complete) ===
Year	Artist	Album title	Rank
2014	2NE1	Crush	11
2015	Exo	Exodus	8
2016	BTS	Wings	6
2016	BTS	The Most Beautiful Moment in Life, Part 2	9
2016	Got7	Flight Log: Departure	15
2017	BTS	Love Yourself: Her	2
2017	G-Dragon	Kwon Ji Yong	5
2017	Big Bang	Made	6
2017	Exo	The War	7
2017	BTS	Wings	9
2017	BTS	You Never Walk Alone	11
2018	BTS	Love Yourself: Tear	1
2018	BTS	Love Yourself: Answer	2
2018	BTS	Love Yourself: Her	3
2018	J-Hope	Hope World	5
2018	Exo	Don't Mess Up My Tempo	8
2018	RM	mono.	9
2018	Blackpink	Square Up	12
2018	BTS	Face Yourself	13
2018	NCT 127	Regular-Irregular	14
2019	BTS	Map of the Soul: Persona	1
2019	SuperM	SuperM (EP)	2
2019	BTS	Love Yourself: Answer	3
2019	BTS	Love Yourself: Tear	4
2019	BTS	BTS World: Original Soundtrack	6
2019	BTS	Love Yourself: Her	8
2019	NCT 127	We Are Superhuman	9
2019	Exo	Don't Mess Up My Tempo	11
2019	Blackpink	Kill This Love	14
2020	BTS	Map of the Soul: 7	1
2020	BTS	Love Yourself: Answer	2
2020	NCT 127	Neo Zone	3
2020	Blackpink	The Album	4
2020	BTS	Map of the Soul: Persona	6
2020	SuperM	Super One (album)	7
2020	SuperM	SuperM (EP)	8
2020	BTS	Map of the Soul: 7 - The Journey	9
2020	BTS	Love Yourself: Tear	10
2020	NCT	NCT 2020 Resonance Pt. 1	11
2020	Blackpink	Kill This Love	12
2020	BTS	BTS World: Original Soundtrack	13
2020	BTS	You Never Walk Alone	14
2020	Suga (Agust D)	D-2	15
2021	BTS	Be	1
2021	BTS	Map of the Soul: 7	2
2021	Blackpink	The Album	3
2021	TXT	The Chaos Chapter: Freeze	5
2021	BTS	Love Yourself: Answer	6
2021	NCT	NCT 2020 Resonance Pt. 1	7
2021	BTS	Love Yourself: Tear	8
2021	BTS	Love Yourself: Her	9
2021	BTS	Map of the Soul: Persona	11
2021	NCT 127	Sticker	13
2021	BTS	Skool Luv Affair	14
2021	Twice	Taste of Love	15
2022	BTS	Proof	1
2022	TXT	Minisode 2: Thursday's Child	3
2022	Stray Kids	Oddinary	4
2022	Twice	Formula of Love: O+T=<3	5
2022	Twice	Between 1&2	6
2022	BTS	Map of the Soul: 7	7
2022	NCT 127	Sticker	9
2022	Stray Kids	Maxident	10
2022	BTS	Be	11
2022	Seventeen	Face the Sun	12
2022	Enhypen	Manifesto: Day 1	13
2022	Nayeon	Im Nayeon	15
2023	Stray Kids	5-Star	1
2023	TXT	The Name Chapter: Temptation	2
2023	NewJeans	Get Up	4
2023	Jimin	Face	5
2023	Twice	Ready to Be	6
2023	BTS	Proof	7
2023	Seventeen	FML	8
2023	Suga (Agust D)	D-Day	9
2023	Enhypen	Dark Blood	11
2023	RM	Indigo	12
2023	Le Sserafim	Unforgiven	13
2023	Ateez	The World EP.2: Outlaw	14
2023	Stray Kids	Maxident	15
2024	Stray Kids	Rock-Star	1
2024	Stray Kids	Ate	2
2024	NewJeans	Get Up	3
2024	TXT	The Name Chapter: Freefall	4
2024	Enhypen	Orange Blood	5
2024	Ateez	The World EP.Fin: Will	6
2024	Enhypen	Romance: Untold	7
2024	Ateez	Golden Hour: Part.1	9
2024	TXT	Minisode 3: Tomorrow	10
2024	Jimin	Muse	11
2024	BTS	Proof	12
2024	Seventeen	Seventeenth Heaven	13
2024	Twice	With You-th	15
2025	Stray Kids	Hop	1
2025	Stray Kids	Karma	2
2025	Jimin	Muse	3
2025	Enhypen	Romance: Untold	5
2025	Ateez	Golden Hour: Part.2	6
2025	Ateez	Golden Hour: Part.3	8
2025	Enhypen	Desire: Unleash	9
2025	BTS	Proof	10
2025	Stray Kids	Ate	11
2025	TXT	The Star Chapter: Sanctuary	12
2025	Seventeen	Spill the Feels	13
2025	TXT	The Star Chapter: Together	14
2025	Jin	Happy	15

=== World Albums Artists (Year end) (Complete) ===
Year	Artist	Rank
2013	G-Dragon	9
2013	SHINee	10
2014	Exo	7
2014	2NE1	9
2015	Exo	7
2016	BTS	5
2016	Got7	6
2017	BTS	1
2017	G-Dragon	5
2017	Big Bang	6
2017	Exo	7
2018	BTS	1
2018	Exo	5
2018	J-Hope	6
2018	RM	7
2018	Blackpink	9
2018	NCT 127	10
2019	BTS	1
2019	SuperM	2
2019	NCT 127	4
2019	Exo	7
2019	Blackpink	10
2020	BTS	1
2020	NCT 127	2
2020	SuperM	3
2020	Blackpink	4
2020	NCT	7
2020	Stray Kids	9
2020	Suga (Agust D)	10
2021	BTS	1
2021	Blackpink	2
2021	TXT	3
2021	NCT	5
2021	NCT 127	7
2021	Twice	8
2021	Enhypen	9
2021	Seventeen	10
2022	BTS	1
2022	Twice	2
2022	Stray Kids	3
2022	TXT	4
2022	Seventeen	5
2022	NCT 127	6
2022	Enhypen	8
2022	Itzy	10
2023	Stray Kids	1
2023	BTS	2
2023	NewJeans	3
2023	TXT	4
2023	Twice	6
2023	Jimin	7
2023	Enhypen	8
2023	Seventeen	9
2023	Ateez	10
2024	Stray Kids	1
2024	Enhypen	2
2024	TXT	3
2024	Ateez	4
2024	Seventeen	5
2024	Jimin	6
2024	NewJeans	7
2024	Le Sserafim	8
2024	BTS	10
2025	Stray Kids	1
2025	Ateez	2
2025	Enhypen	3
2025	TXT	4
2025	Jimin	5
2025	BTS	6
2025	Seventeen	7
2025	Jin	9

=== World Albums Imprints (Year end) (Complete) ===
Year	Label	Rank
2014	SM Entertainment	5
2015	SM Entertainment	2
2016	Big Hit Entertainment	4
2016	SM Entertainment	5
2017	Big Hit Entertainment	2
2017	YG Entertainment	3
2017	SM Entertainment	5
2018	Big Hit Entertainment	1
2018	SM Entertainment	2
2019	Big Hit Entertainment	1
2019	SM Entertainment	2
2019	TakeOne Company	3
2020	Big Hit Entertainment	1
2020	SM Entertainment	2
2020	YG Entertainment	4
2021	Big Hit Entertainment	1
2021	SM Entertainment	2
2021	JYP Entertainment	4
2022	Big Hit Entertainment	1
2022	JYP Entertainment	3
2022	SM Entertainment	5
2023	Big Hit Entertainment	2
2023	JYP Entertainment	4
2024	JYP Entertainment	3
2024	Big Hit Entertainment	4
2024	KQ Entertainment	5
2025	JYP Entertainment	3
2025	BigHit Music	4
2025	KQ Entertainment	5

=== World Albums Labels (Year end) (Complete) ===
Year	Label	Rank
2014	SM Entertainment	5
2015	SM Entertainment	2
2016	LOEN Entertainment	4
2017	Big Hit Entertainment	2
2017	LOEN Entertainment	3
2017	YG Entertainment	4
2018	Big Hit Entertainment	1
2018	LOEN Entertainment	2
2018	SM Entertainment	3
2019	Big Hit Entertainment	1
2019	SM Entertainment	3
2020	Big Hit Entertainment	1
2020	SM Entertainment	2
2021	Big Hit Entertainment	1
2021	SM Entertainment	3
2022	SM Entertainment	3
2023	SM Entertainment	5

=== World Digital Song Sales (Year end) (Complete) ===
- Chart started 2010-12-31 and discontinued 2020.

Year	Artist	Song title	Rank
2011	SHINee	"Lucifer"	18
2011	2NE1	"I Am the Best"	24
2012	Psy	"Gangnam Style"	1
2012	Big Bang	"Fantastic Baby"	6
2012	2NE1	"I Love You"	13
2012	2NE1	"I Am the Best"	14
2012	Ultimate Pop Hits!	"Gangnam Style"	16
2012	BigBang	"Monster"	20
2012	BigBang	"Blue"	21
2012	f(x)	"Electric Shock"	22
2012	BigBang	"Bad Boy"	23
2013	Psy	"Gangnam Style"	1
2013	Psy	"Gentleman"	3
2013	BigBang	"Fantastic Baby"	11
2013	Girls' Generation	"I Got a Boy"	13
2013	Exo	"Growl"	14
2013	2NE1	"I Am the Best"	16
2013	CL	"The Baddest Female"	20
2013	Psy	"Right Now"	21
2013	Exo	"Wolf"	23
2013	2NE1	"Falling in Love"	24
2014	Psy	"Gangnam Style"	2
2014	Psy	"Gentleman"	4
2014	Psy feat. Snoop Dogg	"Hangover"	10
2014	2NE1	"I Am the Best"	14
2014	Exo	"Overdose"	18
2014	2NE1	"Come Back Home"	21
2014	Taeyang	"Ringa Linga"	22
2014	Taeyang	"Eyes, Nose, Lips"	23
2014	BigBang	"Fantastic Baby"	24
2015	Psy	"Gangnam Style"	3
2015	2NE1	"I Am the Best"	4
2015	BigBang	"Bang Bang Bang"	5
2015	BigBang	"Loser"	9
2015	BigBang	"If You"	10
2015	BigBang	"Bae Bae"	11
2015	BigBang	"Sober"	12
2015	G-Dragon and Taeyang	"Good Boy"	13
2015	Exo	"Call Me Baby"	14
2015	BTS	"Dope"	17
2015	BigBang	"Let's Not Fall In Love"	18
2015	BigBang	"We Like 2 Party"	19
2015	BTS	"I Need U"	22
2015	G-Dragon and T.O.P	"Zutter"	24
2016	Psy	"Gangnam Style"	3
2016	Psy feat. CL	"Daddy"	5
2016	Exo	"Monster"	6
2016	BTS	"Fire"	7
2016	BTS	"Save Me"	9
2016	BTS	"Dope"	10
2016	BTS	"I Need U"	11
2016	BTS	"Run"	13
2016	Blackpink	"Boombayah"	14
2016	Blackpink	"Whistle"	15
2016	BigBang	"Bang Bang Bang"	16
2016	BTS	"Blood Sweat & Tears"	18
2016	Exo	"Lucky One"	19
2016	Exo	"Lotto"	20
2016	BTS	"Butterfly"	21
2016	4Minute	"Hate"	23
2016	NCT U	"The 7th Sense"	25
2017	BTS	"Not Today"	3
2017	BTS	"Blood Sweat & Tears"	4
2017	BTS	"Spring Day"	5
2017	BTS	"Fire"	6
2017	Psy	"Gangnam Style"	7
2017	BTS	"DNA"	8
2017	BTS	"Save Me"	10
2017	BTS	"Dope"	12
2017	Blackpink	"As If It's Your Last"	13
2017	BTS	"I Need U"	14
2017	BigBang	"Fxxk It"	15
2017	K.A.R.D	"Don't Recall"	18
2017	Exo	"Ko Ko Bop"	20
2017	BTS	"Come Back Home"	23
2017	BTS	"Go Go"	24
2017	BTS	""A Supplementary Story: You Never Walk Alone"	25
2018	BTS feat. Desiigner	"MIC Drop" (Steve Aoki remix)	1
2018	BTS	"Fake Love"	3
2018	BTS feat. Nicki Minaj	"Idol"	4
2018	BTS	"DNA"	5
2018	BTS	"Blood Sweat & Tears"	7
2018	Blackpink	"Ddu-Du Ddu-Du"	9
2018	BTS	"Go Go"	10
2018	BTS	"Fire"	11
2018	BTS	"Euphoria" (Jungkook solo)	12
2018	BTS	"Save Me"	13
2018	BTS	"I'm Fine"	14
2018	BTS	"Don't Leave Me"	15
2018	BTS	"Airplane Pt. 2"	16
2018	BTS	"Anpanman"	17
2018	Psy	"Gangnam Style"	19
2018	BTS	"Epiphany"	20
2018	BTS	"Trivia: Seesaw" (Suga solo)	21
2018	Red Velvet	"Bad Boy"	22
2018	BTS	"Dope"	23
2018	BTS	"Not Today"	24
2018	BTS	"Answer: Love Myself"	25
2019	BTS feat. Halsey	"Boy with Luv"	2
2019	Blackpink	"Kill This Love"	3
2019	BTS feat. Lauv	"Make It Right remix"	4
2019	K/DA feat. (G)I-dle's Miyeon & Soyeon, Madison Beer & Jaira Burns	"Pop/Stars"	7
2019	Blackpink	"Ddu-Du Ddu-Du"	9
2019	BTS and Charli XCX	"Dream Glow"	10
2019	Jennie	"Solo"	11
2019	BTS feat. Desiigner	"Mic Drop" remix	13
2019	BTS feat. Nicki Minaj	"Idol"	14
2019	BTS	"Fake Love"	15
2019	BTS and Zara Larsson	"A Brand New Day"	18
2019	BTS	"Heartbeat"	19
2019	J-Hope feat. Becky G	"Chicken Noodle Soup"	20
2019	BTS and Juice Wrld	"All Night"	23
2019	BTS	"Lights"	24
2019	BTS	"Mikrokosmos"	25

=== World Digital Songs Artists (Year end) (Complete) ===
- Chart started 2010-12-31 and discontinued 2020.

Year	Artist	Peak position
2012	Psy	1
2012	Big Bang	4
2012	2NE1	6
2013	Psy	1
2013	Exo	5
2013	2NE1	10
2014	Psy	2
2014	2NE1	3
2014	Exo	6
2015	BigBang	2
2015	Psy	3
2015	Exo	4
2015	2NE1	8
2015	BTS	9
2016	BTS	2
2016	Exo	3
2016	Psy	4
2016	Blackpink	5
2016	Got7	7
2016	BigBang	10
2017	BTS	1
2017	Blackpink	5
2017	Psy	6
2017	Exo	7
2017	Kard	8
2017	Twice	9
2017	BigBang	10
2018	BTS	1
2018	Blackpink	4
2018	Twice	5
2018	Red Velvet	6
2018	Momoland	10
2019	BTS	1
2019	Blackpink	3
2019	Jennie	9
2019	Twice	10

== See also ==
- List of K-pop on the Billboard charts
- List of K-pop albums on the Billboard charts
- List of K-pop songs on the Billboard charts
- Timeline of K-pop at Billboard
- Timeline of K-pop at Billboard in the 2020s
- Korea K-Pop Hot 100
- Billboard K-Pop Artist 100
- List of K-pop artists
- List of South Korean idol groups
