= List of Billboard 200 number-one albums of 2019 =

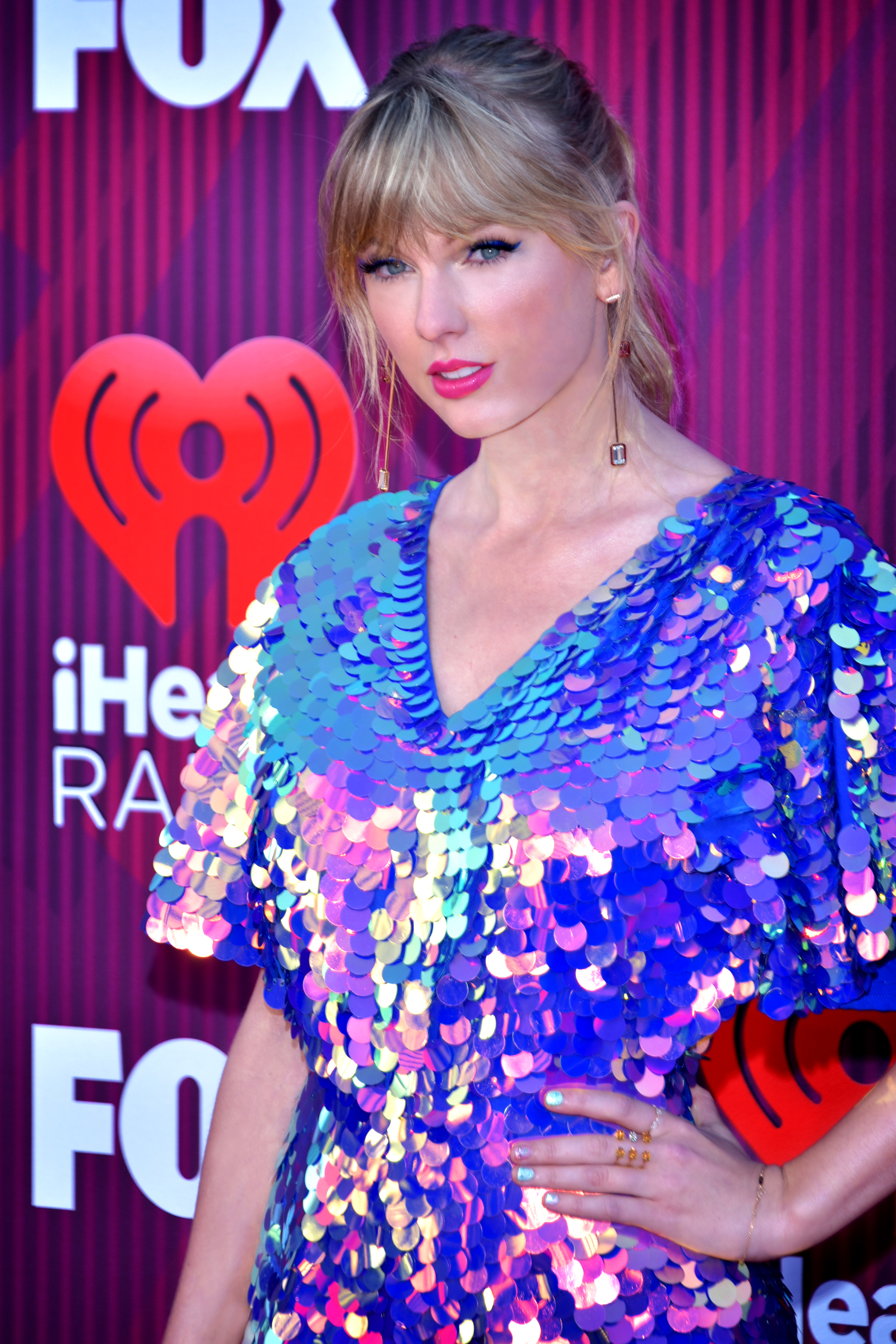
Taylor Swift's seventh studio album, Lover, earned the biggest sales week of 2019, and became the best-selling album of the year.

This is a list of the albums ranked number one in the United States during 2019. The top-performing albums and EPs in the United States are ranked on the Billboard 200 chart, which is published by Billboard magazine. The data is compiled by Nielsen SoundScan based on each album's weekly physical and digital sales, as well as on-demand streaming and digital sales of their individual tracks.

Multiple artists received their first number-one album in 2019, including: 21 Savage, A Boogie wit da Hoodie, Hozier, Juice Wrld (which would be his last released during his lifetime following his death later in the year), Nav, Billie Eilish, Khalid, Tyler, the Creator, The Raconteurs, Young Thug, Luke Combs, DaBaby, SuperM, YoungBoy Never Broke Again, Trippie Redd, and Roddy Ricch.

The year also featured many artists return to the number-one spot after years of absence: the band Tool released their first number-one album in 13 years, the Jonas Brothers released their first in 10 (becoming the third consecutive number-one for both artists), the Backstreet Boys released their first album in 6 years, and their first number-one since 2000, and Celine Dion had her first number-one since 2002. Billie Eilish's debut album When We All Fall Asleep, Where Do We Go? was the best performing album of 2019. Taylor Swift's seventh studio album, Lover, was the best-selling album of 2019, and had the year's biggest sales week with 867,000 units.

== Chart history ==
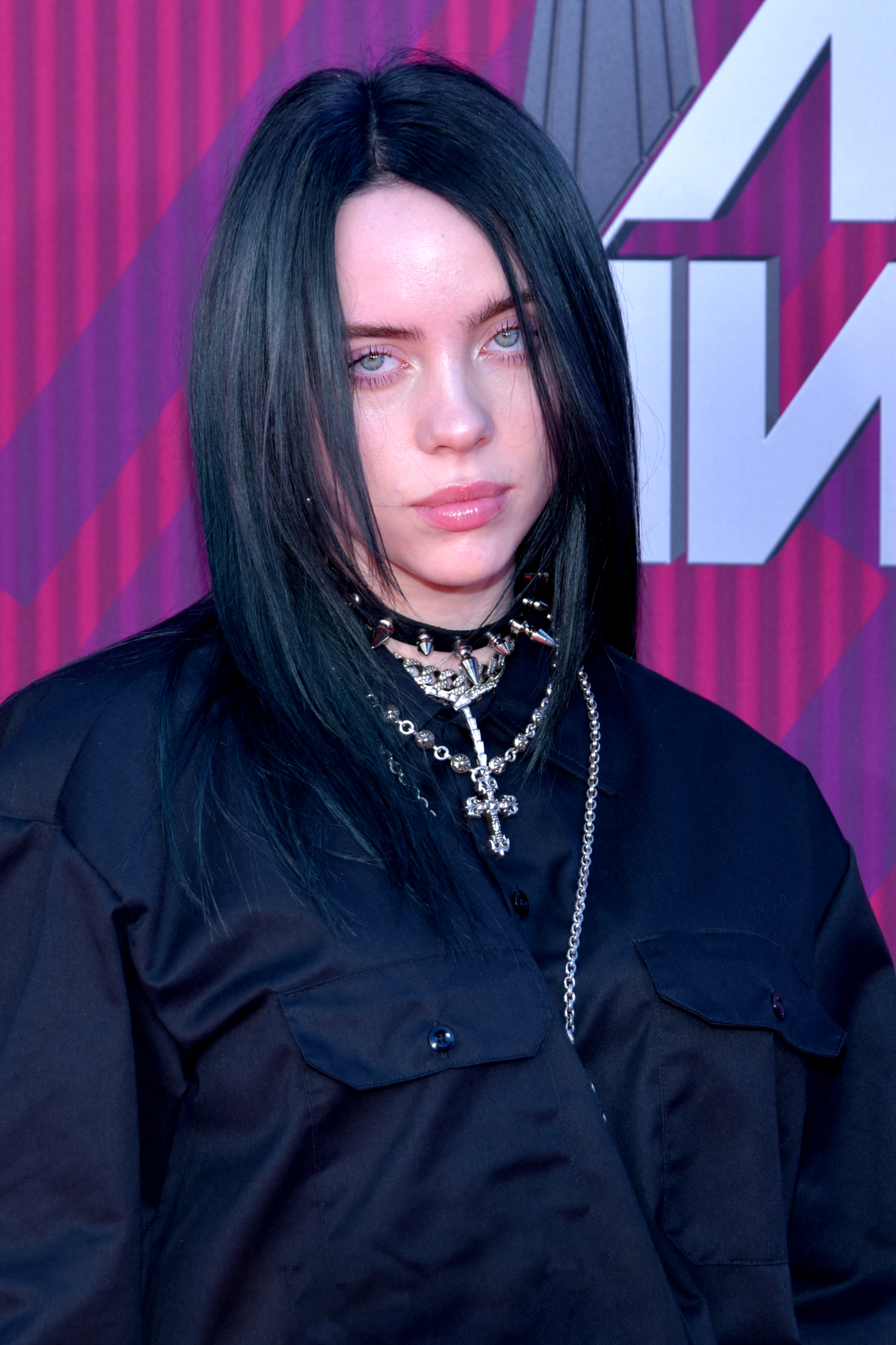
Billie Eilish's debut album, When We All Fall Asleep, Where Do We Go?, was the best performing album of 2019. Eilish became the first artist born in the 21st century to have a number-one album on the Billboard 200.

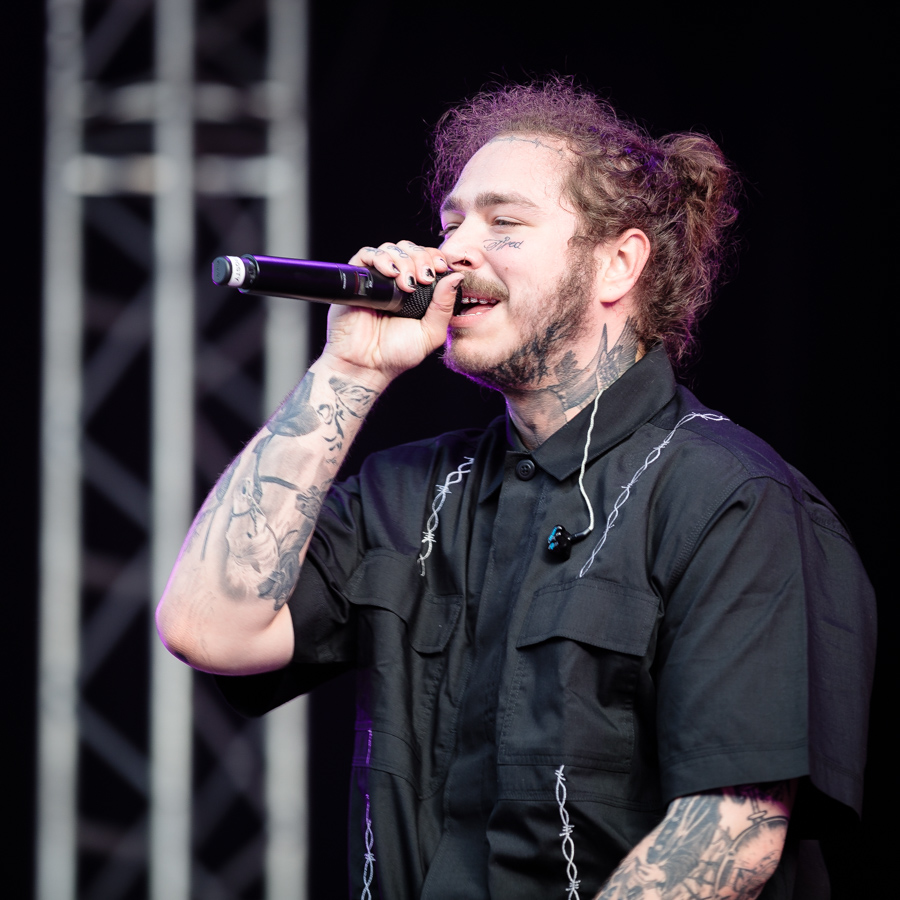
Post Malone had the longest-running number-one album of the year, with his album Hollywood's Bleeding topping the chart for five non-consecutive weeks.

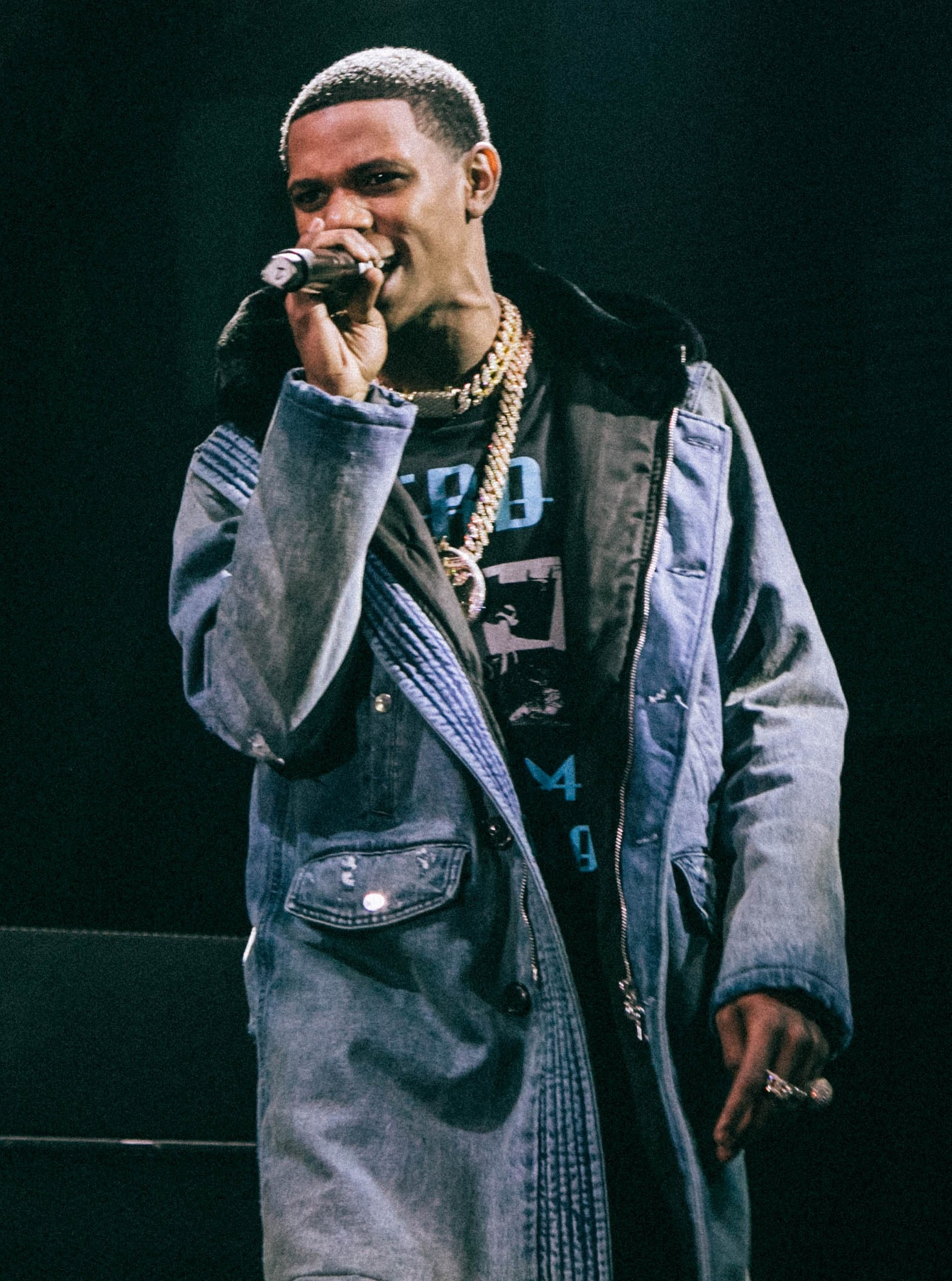
Rapper A Boogie Wit da Hoodie topped the chart for three weeks with his second studio album, Hoodie SZN.

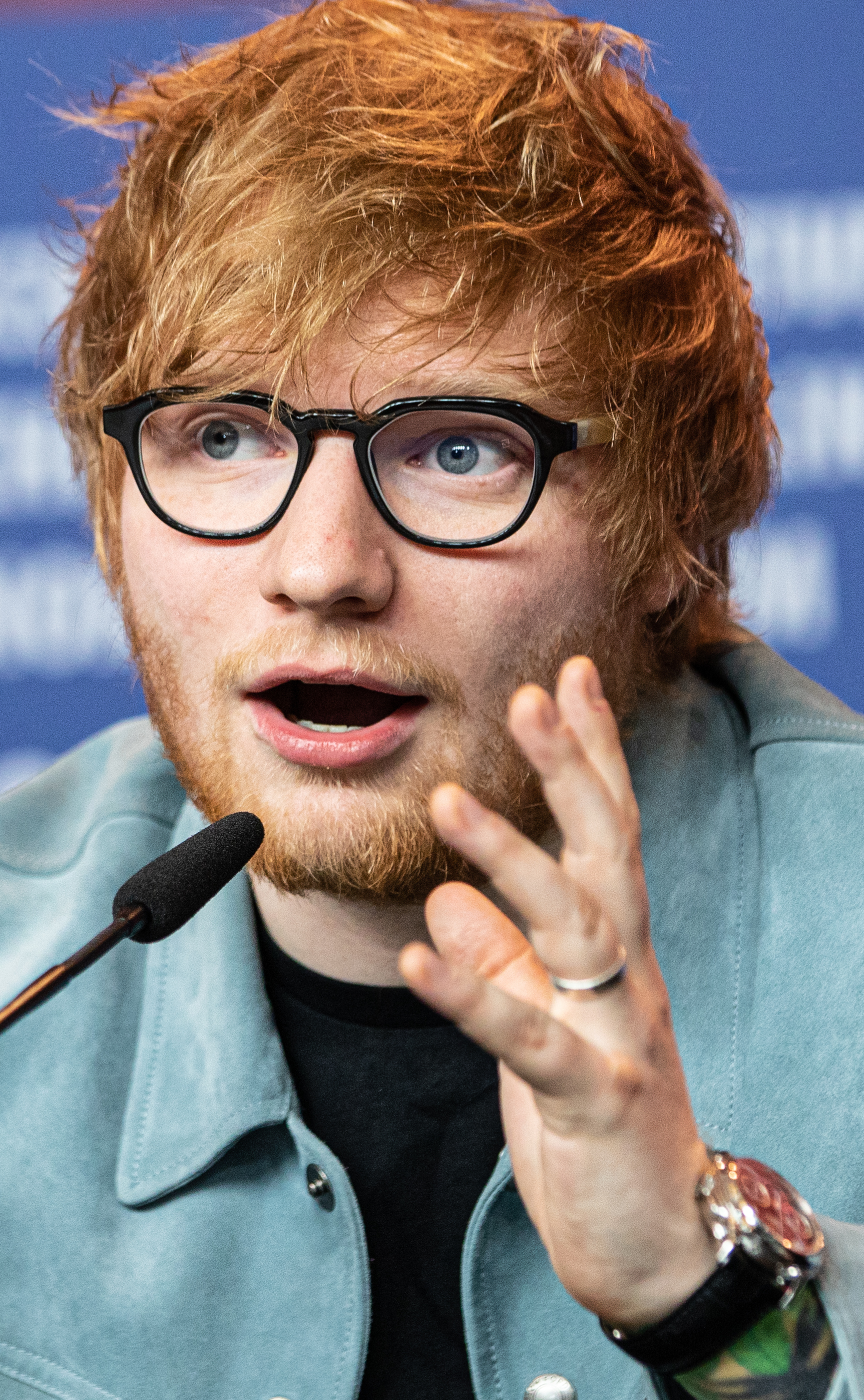
English singer Ed Sheeran scored his third number one album with his fourth studio album, No.6 Collaborations Project.

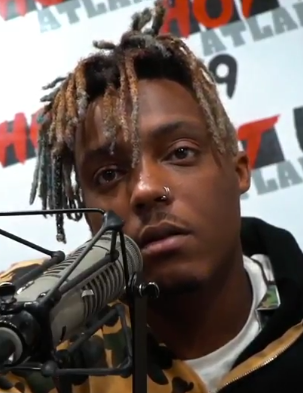
Juice Wrld had his first number-one album with his second studio album Death Race for Love. It would be the last album released during his lifetime, as he died on December 8, 2019.

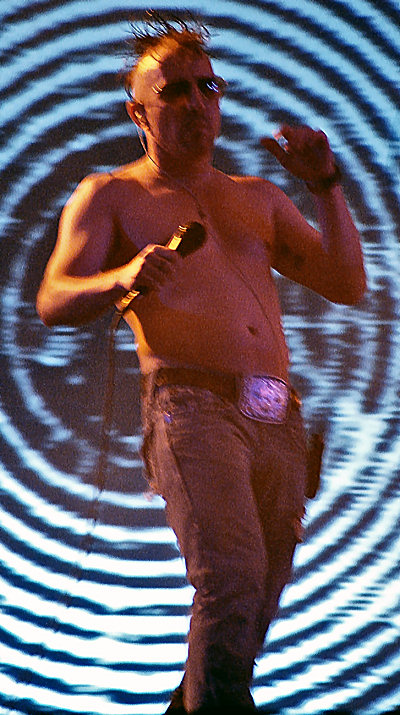
Fear Inoculum by Tool topped the chart with the highest debut for a rock/metal band in 2019. (pictured is frontman Maynard James Keenan).

Key
†	Indicates best-performing album of 2019

Issue date	Album	Artist(s)	Album- equivalent units	Ref.
January 5	I Am > I Was	21 Savage	131,000	
January 12	I Am > I Was	21 Savage	65,000	
January 19	Hoodie SZN	A Boogie wit da Hoodie	58,000	
January 26	Hoodie SZN	A Boogie wit da Hoodie	56,000	
February 2	Future Hndrxx Presents: The Wizrd	Future	126,000	
February 9	DNA	Backstreet Boys	234,000	
February 16	Hoodie SZN	A Boogie wit da Hoodie	47,000	
February 23	Thank U, Next	Ariana Grande	360,000	
March 2	Thank U, Next	Ariana Grande	151,000	
March 9	A Star Is Born	Lady Gaga and Bradley Cooper / Soundtrack	129,000	
March 16	Wasteland, Baby!	Hozier	89,000	
March 23	Death Race for Love	Juice Wrld	165,000	
March 30	Death Race for Love	Juice Wrld	74,000	
April 6	Bad Habits	Nav	82,000	
April 13	When We All Fall Asleep, Where Do We Go? †	Billie Eilish	313,000	
April 20	Free Spirit	Khalid	202,000	
April 27	Map of the Soul: Persona	BTS	230,000	
May 4	When We All Fall Asleep, Where Do We Go? †	Billie Eilish	88,000	
May 11	Hurts 2B Human	Pink	115,000	
May 18	Father of the Bride	Vampire Weekend	138,000	
May 25	Confessions of a Dangerous Mind	Logic	80,000	
June 1	Igor	Tyler, the Creator	165,000	
June 8	When We All Fall Asleep, Where Do We Go? †	Billie Eilish	62,000	
June 15	Center Point Road	Thomas Rhett	76,000	
June 22	Happiness Begins	Jonas Brothers	414,000	
June 29	Madame X	Madonna	95,000	
July 6	Help Us Stranger	The Raconteurs	88,000	
July 13	Indigo	Chris Brown	108,000	
July 20	Revenge of the Dreamers III	Dreamville / Various Artists	115,000	
July 27	No.6 Collaborations Project	Ed Sheeran	173,000	
August 3	No.6 Collaborations Project	Ed Sheeran	78,000	
August 10	The Search	NF	130,000	
August 17	Care Package	Drake	109,000	
August 24	We Are Not Your Kind	Slipknot	118,000	
August 31	So Much Fun	Young Thug	131,000	
September 7	Lover	Taylor Swift	867,000	
September 14	Fear Inoculum	Tool	270,000	
September 21	Hollywood's Bleeding	Post Malone	489,000	
September 28	Hollywood's Bleeding	Post Malone	198,000	
October 5	Hollywood's Bleeding	Post Malone	149,000	
October 12	Kirk	DaBaby	146,000	
October 19	SuperM – The 1st Mini Album	SuperM	168,000	
October 26	AI YoungBoy 2	YoungBoy Never Broke Again	110,000	
November 2	Hollywood's Bleeding	Post Malone	93,000	
November 9	Jesus Is King	Kanye West	264,000	
November 16	Hollywood's Bleeding	Post Malone	78,000	
November 23	What You See Is What You Get	Luke Combs	172,000	
November 30	Courage	Celine Dion	113,000	
December 7	A Love Letter to You 4	Trippie Redd	104,000	
December 14	Frozen II	Soundtrack	80,000	
December 21	Please Excuse Me for Being Antisocial	Roddy Ricch	101,000	
December 28	Fine Line	Harry Styles	478,000	

== Number-one artists ==
List of number-one artists by total weeks at number one
Position	Country	Artist	Weeks at No. 1
1	US	Post Malone	5
2	US	A Boogie wit da Hoodie	3
2	US	Billie Eilish	3
3	UK	21 Savage	2
3	US	Ariana Grande	2
3	US	Juice Wrld	2
3	UK	Ed Sheeran	2
4	US	Future	1
4	US	Backstreet Boys	1
4	US	Lady Gaga	1
4	US	Bradley Cooper	1
4	UK	Hozier	1
4	Canada	Nav	1
4	US	Khalid	1
4	Korea	BTS	1
4	US	Pink	1
4	US	Vampire Weekend	1
4	US	Logic	1
4	US	Tyler, the Creator	1
4	US	Thomas Rhett	1
4	US	Jonas Brothers	1
4	US	Madonna	1
4	US	The Raconteurs	1
4	US	Chris Brown	1
4	US/France	Various Dreamville artists	1
4	US	NF (rapper)	1
4	Canada	Drake	1
4	US	Slipknot	1
4	US	Young Thug	1
4	US	Taylor Swift	1
4	US	Tool	1
4	US	DaBaby	1
4	Korea	SuperM	1
4	US	YoungBoy Never Broke Again	1
4	US	Kanye West	1
4	US	Luke Combs	1
4	Canada	Celine Dion	1
4	US	Trippie Redd	1
4	US	Various artists	1
4	US	Roddy Ricch	1
4	UK	Harry Styles	1

== See also ==
- 2019 in American music
- List of Billboard Hot 100 number ones of 2019
