= Jopping =

2019 debut single by SuperM

Single by SuperM

from the EP SuperM
- Language: English; Korean
- Released: October 4, 2019
- Recorded: September 2019
- Studio: SM Booming System (Seoul)
- Genre: K-pop; hip hop; R&B
- Length: 4:11
- Label: SM; Capitol
- Composers: Geoffrey McCray; Tay Jasper; Adrian Mckinnon; Zachary Chicoine; Nasia Jones; Marcus Scott; LDN Noise
- Lyricists: Tay Jasper; Adrian Mckinnon; Kim Min-ji; Hwang Yu-bin
- Producers: LDN Noise; Yoo Young-jin

SuperM singles chronology
"Jopping" (2019)	"Let's Go Everywhere" (2020)

Music video
- "Jopping" on YouTube

"Jopping" is the debut single by South Korean pop group SuperM. It was released on October 4, 2019 as the first single from the eponymous debut extended play by SM Entertainment and Capitol Records.

== Composition and lyrics ==
"Jopping", a combination of words jumping and popping, is the lead track off SuperM’s self-titled debut EP. The song features heavy electro-pop influences with references to brit-pop sounds. The song uses cinematic-style horns and a groovy beat. A fusion of pop-rock, R&B, and hip-hop genres can be heard in the vocal and rap talents of each member.

== Music video ==
Filmed in the UAE desert and Dubai’s urban jungle, the futuristic video features supercars and bikes in action, while a helicopter sits pretty in the background. The Meydan Bridge, Business Bay and Sheikh Zayed Road’s famous skyline are also spotted on ‘Jopping’ video at one point, while Al Khail Road and the deserted landscape of Ras Al Khor also features in the 4.44 long video.

== Live performances ==
The group performed "Jopping" for the first time on a showcase at the Capitol Records building in Los Angeles on October 5, 2019. On October 9, 2019 the group made their American TV debut on The Ellen DeGeneres Show performing the song. On February 11, 2020 the group performed the song on Jimmy Kimmel Live!.

== Charts ==
Chart (2019)	Peak position
Canada (Canadian Hot 100)	85
France Download (SNEP)	140
Japan (Japan Hot 100)	27
Malaysia (RIM)	20
New Zealand Hot Singles (RMNZ)	24
Singapore (RIAS)	11
South Korea Download (Gaon)	108
South Korea (K-pop Hot 100)	84
UK Digital Singles (OCC)	96
US Bubbling Under Hot 100 (Billboard)	25
US World Digital Songs (Billboard)	1

== Accolades ==
Year-end lists
Critic/Publication	List	Rank	Ref.
Dazed	The 20 best K-pop songs of 2019	15	
Billboard	The 25 best K-pop Songs of 2019	25	
South China Morning Post	The 10 best K-pop songs of 2019	7	
BuzzFeed	Best K-pop Music Videos of 2019	13	

== Release history ==
Region	Date	Format	Label
United States	October 4, 2019	Digital download; streaming	SM; Capitol
Various	October 4, 2019	Digital download; streaming	SM

== Credits and personnel ==
Credits adapted from album's liner notes.

=== Studio ===
- SM Booming System – recording, mixing, engineered for mix, digital editing
- Sonic Korea – mastering

=== Personnel ===
- SM Entertainment – executive producer
- Lee Soo-man – producer
- Lee Sung-soo – production director
- Tak Young-jun – management director
- Kim Young-min – executive supervisor
- SuperM – vocals, background vocals
- Tay Jasper – producer, lyrics, composition, background vocals
- Adrian Mckinnon – producer, lyrics, composition, background vocals
- Kim Min-ji – lyrics
- Hwang Yu-bin – lyrics
- Geoffrey McCray – composition
- Zachary Chicoine – composition
- Nasia Jones – composition
- Marcus Scott – composition
- LDN Noise – producer, composition, arrangement
- Yoo Young-jin – producer, arrangement, vocal directing, background vocals, recording, mixing, engineered for mix, digital editing, music and sound supervisor
- Jeon Hoon – mastering
