= 100 (SuperM song) =

2020 single by SuperM

Single by SuperM

from the album Super One
- Language: English; Korean
- Released: August 14, 2020
- Studio: SM Booming System (Seoul)
- Genre: K-pop; hip hop; dubstep; techno
- Length: 3:26
- Label: SM; Capitol
- Composers: Harold "Alawn" Philippon; Andy Love; Jasmine Kara Khatib-nia; Mark; Ryan S. Jhun; Yoo Young-jin
- Lyricists: Mark; Andy Love; Yoo Young-jin
- Producers: Harold "Alawn" Philippon; Andy Love; Yoo Young-jin

SuperM singles chronology
"Let's Go Everywhere" (2020)	"100" (2020)	"Tiger Inside" (2020)

Music video
- "100" on YouTube

"100" is a single by South Korean supergroup SuperM. It was released on August 14, 2020, through SM Entertainment and Capitol Records, as the first pre-release single from the group's debut studio album, Super One, which was released on September 25, 2020.

== Composition and lyrics ==
"100" was described as a track with a fast base line and dynamic rhythms that expresses SuperM's unique and powerful energy. The song was composed by Mark, Harold "Alawn" Philippon, Andy Love, Jasmine Kara Khatib-nia, Ryan S. Jhun and Yoo Young-jin, with the arrangement was held by Alawn, Love and Yoo. The latter two also co-wrote the lyrics with Mark.

Critics have described it as an anthemic dubstep-inspired track with big, techno-style beats and an aggressive, thumping bass line that wraps around staccato-style raps and a slinky melody. In terms of musical notation, the song is composed in the key of G major, with a tempo of 115 beats per minute and is three minutes and twenty six seconds long.

== Live performances ==
On August 20, 2020 the group made their American morning TV debut on Good Morning America performing the song. SuperM also performed the song on Music Station on August 21. On August 29, SuperM performed "100" at a-nation online 2020.

== Charts ==
Chart (2019)	Peak position
Japan (Japan Hot 100)	35
South Korea (K-pop Hot 100)	94
US World Digital Songs (Billboard)	7

== Release history ==
Region	Date	Format	Label
Various	August 14, 2020	Digital download; streaming	SM; Capitol
South Korea	August 14, 2020	Digital download; streaming	SM

== Credits and personnel ==
Credits adapted from album's liner notes.

Studio

- SM Booming System – recording, digital editing, engineered for mix, mixing
- Sonic Korea – mastering

Personnel

- SM Entertainment – executive producer
- Lee Soo-man – producer
- Lee Sung-soo – production director, executive supervisor
- Tak Young-jun – executive supervisor
- SuperM – vocals
  - Mark – lyrics, composition
- Yoo Young-jin – producer, lyrics, composition, arrangement, vocal directing, background vocals, recording, digital editing, engineered for mix, mixing, music and sound supervisor
- Andy Love – producer, lyrics, composition, arrangement
- Harold "Alawn" Philippon – producer, composition, arrangement
- Jasmine Kara Khatib-nia – composition
- Ryan S. Jhun – composition
- Jeon Hoon – mastering
