= SuperM (EP) =

- Digital cover

EP by SuperM
- Released: October 4, 2019
- Recorded: 2019
- Studios: Doobdoob (Seoul); Seoul; SM Booming System (Seoul); SM Blue Cup (Seoul); SM Blue Ocean (Seoul); SM LVYIN (Seoul); SM SSAM (Seoul); Sound POOL (Seoul)
- Genres: K-pop; Hip hop; dance; R&B
- Length: 24:57
- Languages: Korean; English
- Labels: Capitol; Dreamus; SM
- Producer: Lee Soo-man

SuperM chronology
SuperM (2019)	Super One (2020)

Singles from SuperM
- 1. "Jopping" Released: October 4, 2019

SuperM is the debut extended play (EP) by South Korean supergroup SuperM. It was released on October 4, 2019 by SM Entertainment, Capitol Records and Dreamus. The CD version of the EP has eight different versions: one individual edition for each member and a "united" version.

The EP debuted at the top spot of the United States' Billboard 200 albums chart, becoming the first Korean act to top the chart with their debut release.

== Background and release ==
On August 7, 2019, Capitol Music Group chairman Steve Barnett and SM Entertainment founder Lee Soo-man announced SuperM's debut at Capitol Congress. A teaser revealed the members of the group, with each having performance, vocal, and rap abilities.

On August 28, the instrumental of one of the album's songs, "I Can't Stand the Rain", was released. SM Entertainment began releasing teasers and concept videos on September 1 through SuperM's official social media accounts.

The album and its title track's music video were released on October 4 both digitally and physically.

== Promotion ==
SuperM held their debut concert at the Capitol Records Building in Los Angeles on October 5, and made their television debut on The Ellen DeGeneres Show on October 9. The group then started to embark on their first tour, We Are the Future Live, in November 2019. The last leg of the tour which included a Tokyo Dome concert on April 23, was indefinitely postponed due to the COVID-19 pandemic.

== Commercial performance ==
SuperM debuted at number one on the US Billboard 200 by the end of its first week of release with 168,000 album-equivalent units (of which 164,000 were in album sales), earning the group their record as the first Korean act to hit number one with a debut album. The EP earned the top spot on the Billboard World Albums Chart and remained number one for the next eight consecutive weeks.

Following the EP release, the group topped Billboard's Artist 100 chart as the top musical act in the US for the week ending 19 October, making the group the second K-pop act to ever lead the chart, following BTS. The EP placed itself on the eleventh spot with 31,000 units for the following week and continued to chart on the Billboard 200 for the next six weeks (eight weeks in total).

In South Korea, the EP debuted at the third spot of the Gaon Weekly Albums Chart and sold 153,590 copies in just one day of tracking.

== Track listing ==
SuperM track listing
No.	Title	Lyrics	Music	Arrangement	Length
1.	"Jopping"	Jeremy "Tay" Jasper; Adrian McKinnon; Kim Min-ji; Hwang Yoo-bin	LDN Noise; Jeremy "Tay" Jasper; Adrian McKinnon; Nasia Jones; Geoffrey McCray; Zachary Chicoine; Marcus Scoutt	LDN Noise; Yoo Young-jin	4:11
2.	"I Can't Stand the Rain"	Kenzie	Thomas Troelsen; Sam Martin; Kenzie	Kenzie	3:28
3.	"2 Fast" (performed by Taemin, Baekhyun, Mark, and Lucas)	Danke (lalala Studio)	LDN Noise; Adrian McKinnon; Ebenezer Olaoluwa Fabiyi	LDN Noise	3:00
4.	"Super Car" (performed by Taemin, Baekhyun, Taeyong, Ten, and Mark)	Park Seong-hee	Jonatan Gusmark (Moonshine); Ludvig Evers (Moonshine); Bobii Lewis; Charite Viken Reinås	Moonshine	3:34
5.	"No Manners" (performed by Taemin, Kai, Taeyong and Ten)	Kim Ran; Cho Yu-ri; Taeyong	Jonathan Santana; Shae Jacobs; Tyler Holmes; Taeyong	Jonathan Santana	3:03
6.	"Jopping" (Instrumental)		LDN Noise; Jeremy "Tay" Jasper; Adrian McKinnon; Nasia Jones; Geoffrey McCray; Zachary Chicoine; Marcus Scoutt	LDN Noise; Yoo Young-jin	4:11
7.	"I Can't Stand the Rain" (Instrumental)		Thomas Troelsen; Sam Martin; Kenzie	Kenzie	3:28
Total length:					24:57

== Charts ==
=== Weekly charts ===
Chart (2019–2020)	Peak position
Belgian Albums (Ultratop Flanders)	130
Canadian Albums (Billboard)	38
Croatian International Albums (HDU)	4
Estonian Albums (Eesti Ekspress)	26
French Digital Albums (SNEP)	11
Hungarian Albums (MAHASZ)	34
Japanese Albums (Oricon)	7
Japanese Hot Albums (Billboard Japan)	5
Lithuanian Albums (AGATA)	39
Polish Albums (ZPAV)	34
Scottish Albums (Official Charts)	30
South Korean Albums (Gaon)	3
Spanish Albums (PROMUSICAE)	74
Swiss Albums (Schweizer Hitparade)	86
UK Album Downloads (Official Charts)	19
UK Physical Albums (OCC)	24
US Billboard 200	1
US World Albums (Billboard)	1

=== Year-end charts ===
Chart (2019)	Peak position
South Korean Albums (Gaon)	33
US Billboard 200	185
US World Albums (Billboard)	2

== Accolades ==
Year-end lists
Critic/Publication	List	Work	Rank	Ref.
Dazed	The 20 best K-pop songs of 2019	"Jopping"	15	
Billboard	The 25 best K-pop Songs of 2019	"Jopping"	25	
South China Morning Post	The 10 best K-pop songs of 2019	"Jopping"	7	
BuzzFeed	Best K-pop Music Videos of 2019	"Jopping"	13	
MTV	The Best K-pop B-sides of 2019	"2 Fast"	12	
Refinery29	The Best K-Pop Songs Of 2019	"I Can't Stand The Rain"	10	
PopCrush	Best Pop Albums of 2019	SuperM	—N/a	

== Release history ==
Country	Date	Format	Label
United States	October 4, 2019	CD; LP; digital download; streaming	SM; Capitol
Various	October 4, 2019	Digital download; streaming; CD	UMG; Caroline; Virgin EMI
South Korea	October 31, 2019	CD	SM; Dreamus

== See also ==
- List of K-pop albums on the Billboard charts
- List of K-pop songs on the Billboard charts
- List of Billboard 200 number-one albums of 2019
