= Super One (album) =

- Digital cover

Studio album by SuperM
- Released: September 25, 2020
- Recorded: 2019–2020
- Studio: Doobdoob (Seoul); SM Big Shot (Seoul); SM Blue Cup (Seoul); SM Blue Ocean (Seoul); SM Concert Hall (Seoul); SM Booming System (Seoul); SM LVYIN (Seoul); SM SSAM (Seoul); Sound POOL (Seoul); SM Yellow Tail (Seoul)
- Genre: K-pop
- Length: 50:57
- Language: Korean; English
- Label: Capitol; Dreamus; SM
- Producer: Lee Soo-man

SuperM chronology
SuperM (2019)	Super One (2020)

Singles from Super One
- 1. "With You" Released: April 19, 2020; 2. "100" Released: August 14, 2020; 3. "Tiger Inside" Released: September 1, 2020; 4. "One (Monster & Infinity)" Released: September 25, 2020

Super One is the first studio album by South Korean supergroup SuperM. It was released on September 25, 2020, by SM Entertainment, Capitol Records and Dreamus. The album was preceded by the singles "With You", "100" and "Tiger Inside" and was released alongside the lead single, "One (Monster & Infinity)". The physical edition of the album comes in five versions: two group and three unit versions. The Asia ver. was released on October 26, 2020.

== Background and release ==
Following up promotions for the group's self-titled debut EP, SuperM performed an unreleased song titled "Dangerous Woman" on their concert tour SuperM: We Are the Future Live and during their appearance on The Jimmy Kimmel Show on February 11, 2020. SuperM participated in the Global Citizen event One World: Together at Home on April 18, 2020, during which they performed another new song titled "With You". The song was included in the concert playlist album that was released exclusively for streaming on Spotify on April 19, 2020.

On August 5, 2020, SM Entertainment announced that the group would make their comeback with two digital singles and their first studio album. The album's first single, "100", was released on August 14, 2020. Its follow-up, "Tiger Inside", was released on September 1, 2020. Super One was released on September 25, 2020, along with the music video for the lead single, "One (Monster & Infinity)".

== Composition ==
The album opens with "One (Monster & Infinity)", a so-called "hybrid remix", which is a combination of two different songs. With lyrics full of confidence and the will of overcoming the hardships in front of them without fear, the song showcases SuperM's intense and energetic performance. The second track "Infinity" is described as a song with a grand introduction which begins with a magnificent brass orchestration. The highlight of the song is the immersive introduction from the speedy rapping of members Mark and Taeyong, and the chorus that conveys the ambition of "to go to infinity" with energetic vocals. The album continues with "Monster", a song with an intense energy of distorted percussive bass riffs with a motive reminiscent of a "monster", thus fitting the title of the song. The fourth track "Wish You Were Here" is a song with an addictive chorus melody on top of the reggae rhythm and dub sound. Its lyrics express the feelings of a lover's sorrow caused by being unable to be together due to unavoidable circumstances. "Big Chance", the fifth track of the album, is described as a tropical house song, which conveys the sincere feelings of young people toward their loves ones, saying, "a big mistake we make can be a big opportunity". The next track, "100", is characterized as a song with a fast base line and dynamic rhythms that expresses SuperM's unique and powerful energy. The song was co-written and co-produced by member Mark. The seventh track "Tiger Inside" is the conceptual extension to "I Can’t Stand The Rain". It features traditional Asian elements and futuristic electronic beats.

"We believe that it is very appropriate for the situation that the whole world is going through, the message that we have. Not only are we trying to say that we can overcome all of our problems and all these difficulties as we work together, we also believe that. We just want to spread positivity around the world and really bring hope to the listeners."

—Mark about the meaning of the group's first studio album.

The next half of Super One starts with "Better Days", a song with the message of warm comfort and empathy from SuperM in the current difficult situationexpressed through flexible rap flows and warm vocals, led by a vintage upright piano and contrabass. Vocal group Heritage participated as choir. The ninth track "Together At Home" is described as an R&B disco song driven by a funky bass line, with lyrics that create a good time uniting one another in a new way, not a physical space. The next track, "Drip", is a trendy "ratchet" trap hip-hop genre with a sexy and provocative atmosphere. The lyrics are a visual depiction gradually depicting the increasing tension of the opposite sex. The tenth track "Line 'Em Up" is a rhythmic pop-dance song that is uniquely translated by interpreting reggaeton in the style of SuperM. It expresses the ambition to capture the hearts of fans around the world and make them feel "one". "Dangerous Woman", the eleventh track of the album", again a trap hip-hop song, has an "impressive" reversal from the rich harmonies and ad-lip intro a cappella to a completely different atmosphere. Its lyrics convey the feelings of a man who fell in love with a woman with the fatal charms of both extremes. It is followed by "Step Up" is a song with witty lyrics that express one's desire to take one step further. The fourteenth track "So Long" is a slow jam number that describes the feelings of a man who claims to be a villain by informing about a heartbreaking breakup for the other person. The final track "With You" is described as an up-tempo electropop song that stands out with a rhythmic cut-out guitar. The lyrics express the desire of wanting to be with your loved ones are also directed to the fans, and are characterized by an easy melody that can be enjoyed with the fans in performances.

== Reception ==
Super One received generally positive reviews from critics. Tamar Herman from The Recording Academy opined that the album, which came out during the global COVID-19 pandemic, "spends its length motivating listeners through a freewheeling medley of energetic, vibrant electro-pop anthems and mellowing out to offer up lackadaisical, breezy moments on hopeful tracks". Vandana Pawa from Teen Vogue described Super One as "a monster of a debut full-length album that takes a jaunt through a new era of music and brings the group to the next level".

Year-end lists
Critic/Publication	List	Work	Rank	Ref.
Young Post	The Top 15 K-pop Albums of 2020	Super One	6	
Time	10 Albums That Defined K-Pop's Monumental Year in 2020	Super One	—N/a	
Dazed	The 40 Best K-pop Songs of 2020	"Tiger Inside"	10	
Paper	The 40 Best K-pop Songs of 2020	"Tiger Inside"	26	
Metro	The Best K-pop Comeback Songs of 2020	"Tiger Inside"	15	
BuzzFeed	Best K-Pop Songs of 2020	"One (Monster & Infinity)"	19	
MTV	The Best K-Pop B-sides of 2020	"Wish You Were Here"	13	

== Commercial performance ==
Super One debuted at number two on the US Billboard 200 with 104,000 album-equivalent units (of which 101,000 were in album sales), becoming the group's second top three entry on the chart. Additionally, the album earned the top spot on the Billboard World Albums Chart, making it the group second chart-topper after their debut EP SuperM. SuperM also achieved their first number one on the Billboard Independent Albums Chart.

In Japan, SuperM claimed the number one spot in five major charts on Line Music. Shortly after its release, Super One topped the realtime/daily Line Music Album Chart. The title song "One (Monster & Infinity)" also topped the realtime/daily Line Music Song Chart as well as the daily Line Music K-Pop Chart. "One (Monster & Infinity)" earned the group's its third number one song on the Line Music chart this year, after "100" and "Tiger Inside".

== Track listing ==
Super One track listing
No.	Title	Lyrics	Music	Arrangement	Length
1.	"One (Monster & Infinity)"	Kenzie; Adrian McKinnon; Wilbart "Vedo" McCoy III; Bobii Lewis	Kenzie; Jonatan Gusmark (Moonshine); Ludvig Evers (Moonshine); Adrian McKinnon; Wilbart "Vedo" McCoy III; Bobii Lewis	Moonshine; Kenzie	3:41
2.	"Infinity"	Adrian McKinnon; Bobii Lewis; Kenzie	Jonatan Gusmark (Moonshine); Ludvig Evers (Moonshine); Adrian McKinnon; Bobii Lewis	Moonshine; Kenzie	3:54
3.	"Monster"	Kenzie; Adrian McKinnon; Wilbart "Vedo" McCoy III	Kenzie; Jonatan Gusmark (Moonshine); Ludvig Evers (Moonshine); Wilbart "Vedo" McCoy III	Kenzie; Moonshine	3:42
4.	"Wish You Were Here"	Seo-ro; Ron; Seo Hye-ri; Mok Ji-min (lalala Studio)	Bram Inscore; Jake Torrey; Sam Farrar; Evan Magee	Bram Inscore	3:12
5.	"Big Chance"	Andrew "BullySongs" Bullimore; James Norton; Jeremy "Tay" Jasper	Mich Hansen; Peter Wallevik (PhD); Daniel Davidsen (PhD); Andrew "BullySongs" Bullimore; James Matthew Norton; Jeremy "Tay" Jasper	PhD & Cutfather	2:52
6.	"100"	Mark; Andy Love; Yoo Young-jin	Andy Love; Harold "Alawn" Philippon; Jasmine Kara Khatib-Nia (Cosmos Music); Yoo Young-jin; Mark; Ryan S. Jhun	Andy Love; Harold "Alawn" Philippon; Yoo Young-jin	3:27
7.	"Tiger Inside" (Korean: 호랑이; RR: Horang-i; lit. 'Tiger')	Hwang Yoo-bin	Jonatan Gusmark (Moonshine); Ludvig Evers (Moonshine); Alex Karlsson (JeL)	Moonshine	3:29
8.	"Better Days"	Andy Love; Andreas Öberg; Christoffer Semelius	Christoffer Semelius; Andreas Öberg; Andy Love	Christoffer Semelius; Andreas Öberg; Andy Love	3:55
9.	"Together at Home"	Lee Seu-ran (Joombas); Taeyong; Mark	Sylvester "Sly" Willy Sivertsen (Makeumine Works); Samuel Preston; Carl Lehmann	Sylvester "Sly" Willy Sivertsen (Makeumine Works); Samuel Preston; Carl Lehmann	3:26
10.	"Drip"	Jo Yoon-kyung	LDN Noise; Keynon "KC" Moore (3Sixty); Jeremy "Tay" Jasper; Zachary Chicoine	LDN Noise	2:38
11.	"Line 'Em Up"	Cheon Song-yi (Joombas)	Daniel "Obi" Klein; Charli Taft; Rudi Daouk (Jay & Rudy); Jakob Mihoubi (Jay & Rudy)	Daniel "Obi" Klein	3:24
12.	"Dangerous Woman"	Danke (lalala studio)	LDN Noise; Maegan Cottone; Stephan Benson (Misunderstood); Jeffrey Okyere-Twumasi (Misunderstood)	LDN Noise	3:09
13.	"Step Up"	Danke (lalala studio)	Daniel "Obi" Klein; Charli Taft; Andreas Öberg; NODAY	Daniel "Obi" Klein	2:56
14.	"So Long"	Mok Ji-min (lalala Studio)	Andy Love; Alyssa Ayaka Ichinose; Carlyle Fernandes; Andreas Öberg	Andy Love; Alyssa Ayaka Ichinose; Carlyle Fernandes; Andreas Öberg	3:50
15.	"With You"	Johnny West	Benjamin Roberts; Jonny West; Gaelen Whittemore; Victor Manzano	Benjamin Roberts; Jonny West; Gaelen Whittemore; Victor Manzano	3:23
Total length:					50:57

Super One extended version track listing
No.	Title	Length
16.	"100" (Music video) (Performance video)	3:37
17.	"Tiger Inside" (Music video) (Performance video)	3:32
18.	"100" (Music video)	3:36
19.	"Tiger Inside" (Music video)	3:40
Total length:		65:22

== Personnel ==
Credits adapted from Tidal and Naver.

- Baekhyun – vocals (all tracks)
- Taemin – vocals (all tracks)
- Kai – vocals (all tracks)
- Taeyong – vocals (all tracks), lyricist (track 9)
- Ten – vocals (all tracks)
- Lucas – vocals (all tracks)
- Mark – vocals (all tracks), lyricist (track 6, 9), composer (track 6)
- Lee Soo-man – producer
- Kenzie – production (track 1–3), lyricist (track 1–3), composer (track 1–3), programming (track 1–3)
- Moonshine – production (track 1–3, 7), programming (track 1–3, 7)
- Adrian McKinnon – composer (track 1, 2), lyricist (track 1–3)
- Wilbart "Vedo" McCoy III – composer (track 1, 3), lyricist (track 1, 3)
- Bobii Lewis – composer (track 1, 2), lyricist (track 1, 2)
- Jonatan Gusmark – composer (track 1–3, 7)
- Ludvig Evers – composer (track 1–3, 7)
- Lee Min-kyu – engineer (track 1–3, 5, 12, 15), mixing (track 5)
- Jeong Yoo-ra – engineer (track 1–3, 5, 7, 11, 14–15)
- Kwon Nam-woo – mastering engineer (track 1–3, 4–5, 7–8, 10–11, 13–14)
- Jung Eui-seok – mixing (track 1–3, 7, 12)
- Kang Eun-ji – recording engineer (track 1–3, 9, 13)
- Lee Ji-hong – recording engineer (track 1–3), mixing (track 11, 13)
- No Min-ji – recording engineer (track 1–3, 4–5, 7–8, 11, 13–14)
- Bram Inscore – production, composer, programming (track 4)
- Jake Torrey – production, composer (track 4)
- Sam Farrar – production, composer (track 4)
- Evan Magee – composer (track 4)
- Seo Hye-ri – lyricist (track 4)
- Mok Ji-min – lyricist (track 4, 14)
- Ron – lyricist (track 4)
- Seo-ro – lyricist (track 4)
- Kwon Eugene – engineer (track 4–5, 7–14)
- Jin Namkoong – mixing (track 4, 8)
- Mich Hansen (Cutfather) – production, composer, programming (track 5)
- Daniel Davidsen (PhD) – production, composer, programming (track 5)
- Andrew James Bullimore – composer, lyricist (track 5)
- James Norton – composer, lyricist (track 5)
- Jeremy "Tay" Jasper – composer (track 5, 10), lyricist (track 5)
- Peter Wallevik – composer (track 5)
- Harold "Alawn" Philippon – production, composer, programming (track 6)
- Andy Love – production, composer, lyricist, programming (track 6, 7, 14)
- Yoo Young-jin – production, composer, lyricist, mixing, programming (track 6)
- Ryan S. Jhun – composer (track 6)
- Jasmine Kara Khatib-Nia – composer (track 6)
- Cheon Hoon – mastering engineer (track 6, 12, 15)
- Alexander Magnus Karlsson – composer (track 7)
- Hwang Yoo-bin – lyricist (track 7)
- Min Sungsu – engineer (track 7, 10, 11, 13, 15)
- Andreas Öberg – production, composer, lyricist, programming (track 8, 14)
- Christoffer Semelius – production, composer, lyricist, programming (track 8)
- Carl Lehmann – production, composer, programming (track 9)
- Samuel Preston – production, composer, programming (track 9)
- Sylvester Willy Sivertsen – production, composer, programming (track 9)
- Lee Seu-ran – lyricist (track 9)
- Jang Wooyoung – engineer (track 9, 12)
- LDN Noise – production, programming (track 10, 12)
- Greg Bonnick – composer (track 10, 12)
- Hayden Chapman – composer (track 10, 12)
- Kenyon Moore – composer (track 10)
- Jo Yoon-kyung – lyricist (track 10)
- Zachary Chicoine – composer (track 10)
- Kim Chul-soon – mixing (track 10, 14, 15)
- Daniel "Obi" Klein – production, composer, programming (track 11, 13)
- Charli Taft – composer (track 11, 13)
- Cheon Song-yi – lyricist (track 11)
- Jakob Mihoubi – composer (track 11)
- Rudi Daouk – composer (track 11)
- Danke – lyricist (track 12, 13)
- Lee Hee-joo – composer (track 12, 13)
- Jeffrey Twumasi – composer (track 12)
- Maegan Cottone – composer (track 12)
- Stephan Benson – composer (track 12)
- Park Wu-hyun – composer (track 12, 13)
- On Seung-yun – engineer (track 12)
- Noday – composer (track 13)
- Alyssa Ichinose – production, composer (track 14)
- Carlyle Fernandes – production, composer, programming (track 14)
- Benjamin Roberts – production, composer, programming (track 15)
- Gaelen Whittemore – production, composer, programming (track 15)
- Jonny West – lyricist (track 15)
- Victor Manzano – production, composer, programming (track 15)
- Maxx Song – engineer (track 15)

== Charts ==
=== Weekly charts ===
Chart performance for Super One
Chart (2020)	Peak position
Australian Albums (ARIA)	82
Austrian Albums (Ö3 Austria)	22
Belgian Albums (Ultratop Flanders)	175
Belgian Albums (Ultratop Wallonia)	73
Canadian Albums (Billboard)	69
French Albums (SNEP)	73
German Albums (Offizielle Top 100)	19
Hungarian Albums (MAHASZ)	22
Japanese Albums (Oricon)	12
New Zealand Albums (RMNZ)	40
Polish Albums (ZPAV)	45
Scottish Albums (OCC)	78
South Korean Albums (Gaon)	1
Swiss Albums (Schweizer Hitparade)	14
UK Album Downloads (OCC)	29
US Billboard 200	2
US Independent Albums (Billboard)	1
US World Albums (Billboard)	1

=== Year-end charts ===
2020 year-end chart performance for Super One
Chart (2020)	Position
US Independent Albums (Billboard)	43
US World Albums (Billboard)	7

== Certifications and sales figures ==
Sales certifications for Super One
Region	Certification	Certified units/sales
South Korea (KMCA)	2× Platinum	504,232

== Release history ==
Region	Date	Label(s)	Format
Various	September 25, 2020	SM; Capitol	Digital download; streaming
United States	September 25, 2020	SM; Capitol	CD
South Korea	October 26, 2020	SM; Dreamus	CD
United States	November 20, 2020	SM; Capitol	cassette

== See also ==
- List of K-pop albums on the Billboard charts
- List of K-pop songs on the Billboard charts
