= SuperM =

South Korean boy band

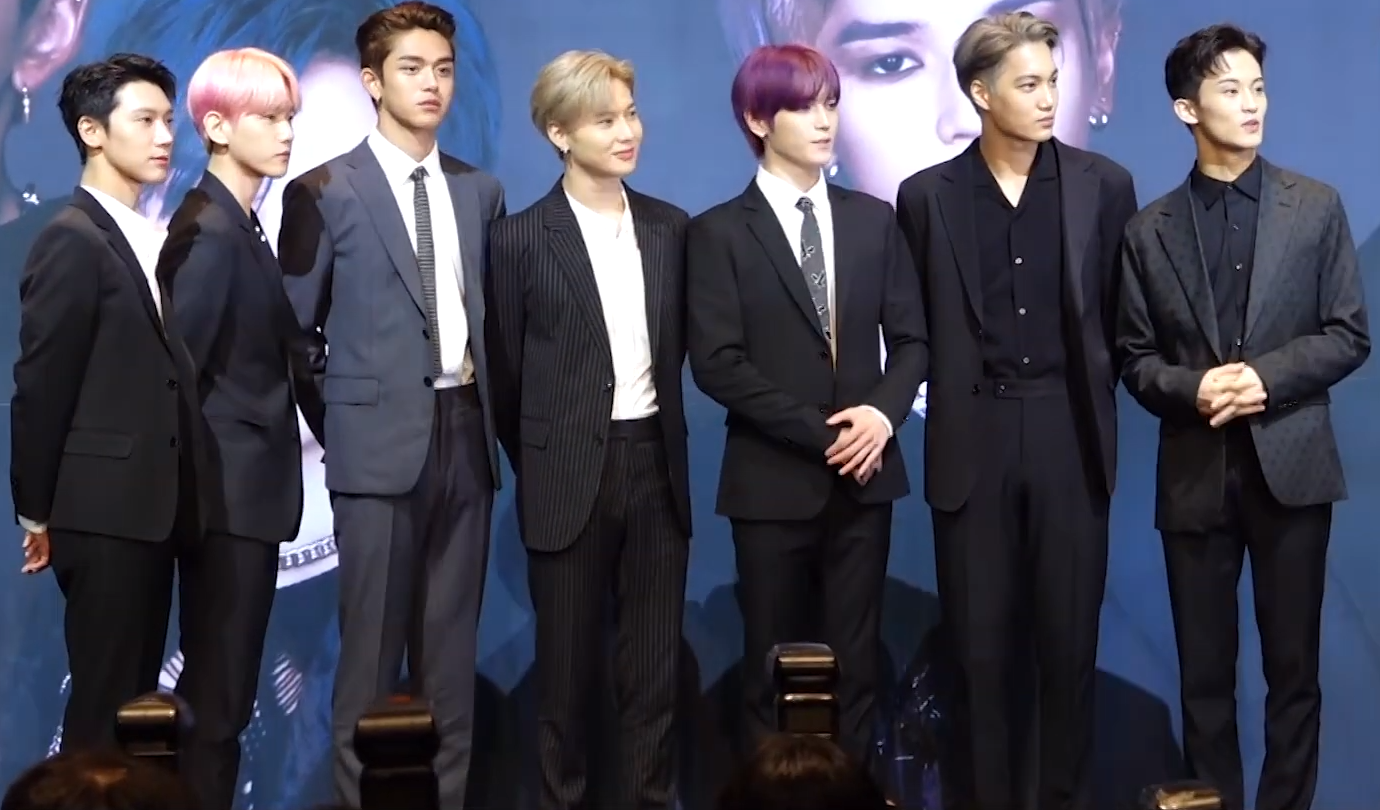
- SuperM in October 2019; From left: Ten, Baekhyun, Lucas, Taemin, Taeyong, Kai, and Mark

Background information
- Origin: Seoul, South Korea
- Genres: K-pop; dance-pop; hip hop; R&B
- Years active: 2019–2021
- Labels: SM; Capitol
- Spinoff of: Shinee; Exo; NCT 127; WayV
- Past members: Baekhyun; Taemin; Kai; Taeyong; Ten; Lucas; Mark
- Website: www.smtown.com/artist/musician/10730; superm.smtown.com (2020 archive); superm-japan.com

SuperM (Korean: 슈퍼엠) was a South Korean supergroup formed in 2019 by SM Entertainment and Capitol Music Group. The group consisted of seven members from four SM Entertainment boy bands: Taemin from Shinee, Baekhyun and Kai from Exo, Taeyong and Mark from NCT 127, and Ten and Lucas from WayV. The group debuted on October 4, 2019, with their self-titled EP, which entered the US Billboard 200 at number one, making SuperM the first Asian artist in history to top the chart with a debut release. Their debut single, "Jopping", was among Billboard's Critics' Picks for the "25 Best K-pop Songs" of 2019.

SuperM went on hiatus in mid-2021 due to mandatory military enlistments and subsequent departures from SM Entertainment. There have been no announcements on the future of the group.

== History ==
=== Background and formation ===
All members of SuperM came from existing boy groups under SM Entertainment. Taemin had been an active artist since the age of 14, when he debuted as a member of Shinee in May 2008. Baekhyun and Kai debuted as members of Exo in April 2012. They have also been members of Exo's Korean sub-unit Exo-K since April 2012, and Baekhyun has been a member of its R&B-oriented sub-unit Exo-CBX since October 2016. Taeyong, Ten, and Mark debuted as members of NCT in April 2016, and Lucas debuted as a member of NCT in January 2018. Taeyong and Mark were added to NCT's Seoul-based sub-unit, NCT 127, in July 2016. Mark also debuted as a member of NCT's then-teenaged sub-unit NCT Dream in August 2016, while Ten and Lucas were added to NCT's China-based sub-unit, WayV, in January 2019.

In 2019, before the official announcement of SuperM's debut, there had been rumors that SM Entertainment was planning to debut a "K-pop Super Boy Band". On August 7, 2019, Capitol Music Group chairman Steve Barnett and SM Entertainment founder Lee Soo-man officially announced the group as SuperM at Capitol Congress 2019. The "M" in SuperM stands for both Matrix and Master, since each member was already an established star in their own groups. The teaser revealed the group members, each excelling in dance performance, vocals, and rap. Described as "the Avengers of K-pop", the group was to be focused more on performance-based music. SM A&R executive and director Chris Lee stated that the group had been in the works for around one year. Lee felt the analogy to the Avengers was apt: "Each Avenger has their own group and Iron Man has his own movie and Thor has his own, but together, they have an even greater synergy, so like that the members will pursue their own careers and own groups but also join together with synergy—a positive one".

Audiences and followers had mixed opinions on the project at first. Some fans are enthusiastic about the band's debut following the release of the first teaser at Capitol Congress 2019. Meanwhile, others were concerned about SM Entertainment prioritizing existing groups, Exo members establish solo careers before their mandatory military service, and the group debuting in the United States rather than starting with Korean promotions. Writing for MTV News, Caitlin Kelley opines that "the biggest takeaway from the backlash is that it's not that easy to combine the powers of multiple fandoms" and felt that the group's structure might be complicated for American audiences, although she noted that "the fact that SuperM trended worldwide for several hours shows potential. That level of engagement means that there is widespread interest in the group—now it's just a matter of turning public opinion around". Kate Halliwell of The Ringer wrote, "plenty of people support several groups within the K-pop genre at large, and it makes sense to target them whenever possible ... but the toxic side of fandom is difficult to escape". She added that the formation of the group "once again [proves] how online backlash is inevitable, and often overwhelming when it comes to navigating multiple K-pop fandoms at once", although she felt that the formation of the group "[signifies] a rising tide in Western K-pop demand".

=== 2019–2020: Debut and Super One ===
SuperM promoted their debut album both in the US and in South Korea. Several teasers were posted on SuperM's various social media channels. The group filmed their debut music video in Dubai in August 2019. The group's self-titled debut EP was released on October 4, with the instrumental of one of the album's songs, "I Can't Stand the Rain", released on August 28. SuperM's lead single, "Jopping", was released alongside its music video on the same day as the EP, which debuted at number one at the Billboard 200 albums chart with 168,000 equivalent album units in the week ending October 10.

SuperM held their debut concert at the Capitol Records Building in Los Angeles on October 5 and made their television debut on The Ellen DeGeneres Show on October 9. The group then embarked on their first tour, We Are the Future Live, with ten dates in North America from November 2019 to February 2020. The tour extended to Latin America and Europe with three shows in February 2020. The group sold-out their stop at the second largest indoor arena in the UK, the O2 Arena, among others. Their Tokyo Dome concert, which was initially scheduled for April 23, was indefinitely postponed due to the COVID-19 pandemic. The group participated in the online concert series, One World: Together at Home, on April 18, to support the COVID-19 Solidarity Response Fund from the World Health Organization, as well as promote social distancing. The group performed an unreleased song, "With You", from separate locations.

In April 2020, SuperM became the first group from SM Entertainment to hold a live online concert, entitled Beyond the Future, jointly organised by SM Entertainment and Naver as part of the world first online-dedicated live concert series, Beyond Live. For their concert on April 26, they performed songs from their debut album as well as new tracks from an upcoming unannounced release, playing to a live audience of more than 75,000 paying real-time viewers from over 109 countries. The revenue from the online concert, from pure ticket sales excluding merchandise, has been estimated at US$2 million.

In August 2020, the group announced their first studio album, Super One, for a September 2020 release. The album release was preceded by a pre-release single, "100", released on August 14. SuperM made their US morning television debut through video call on Good Morning America on August 20 with a performance of "100". In a brief interview prior to the group's performance, Mark explained that the audience was witnessing the exact same set that they used for their Beyond LIVE concert in April. On August 26, SuperM won the Seoul Mayor Award at the 2020 Newsis K-Expo, making it the group's first award since their debut. The second pre-release single, "Tiger Inside", from SuperM's first studio album was released on September 1. It eventually became the group's first song to enter the Gaon Digital Chart. On September 25, SuperM revealed its collaboration with Marvel for a limited edition merchandise series alongside the release of Super One and the album's third and lead single "One (Monster & Infinity)". The album debuted at number two on the Billboard 200 with 104,000 equivalent album units. It became the group's second top three entry after their debut EP. SuperM participated in on online advocacy event for mental health, The Big Event, by the World Health Organization on October 10. The group performed "Better Days" during the event, which was broadcast live on the WHO's Facebook, Twitter, LinkedIn, YouTube and TikTok channels.

=== 2021–present: Military enlistments and company departures ===
Baekhyun enlisted as part of South Korean mandatory military service on May 6, 2021, becoming the group's first member to enlist. Taemin followed suit on May 31.

In the SM Entertainment online concert SM Town Live 2023: SMCU Palace at Kwangya on January 1, 2023, it was announced that SuperM would release music in 2023 following the discharges of Baekhyun and Taemin, Baekhyun completed his military service on February 5, while Taemin finished his on April 4. Lucas left NCT and its sub-unit WayV on May 10. Kai enlisted on May 11, following a surprise notice by the South Korean government while preparing for a then-upcoming Exo album. By the end of the year, the plans for new music did not eventuate.

In 2023, Baekhyun ended his contract with SM Entertainment because of overdue payments and unreasonable deals. It was later announced that he will remain under contract with SM for group activities, while fulfilling solo activities independently. Taemin's contract with SM ended in March 2024, with a similar plan to maintain group activities, though his future with SuperM was unclear. In April, Taeyong was the final member to begin his service, enlisting in the Navy. Kai completed his service in February 2025 and Taeyong his in December 2025.

Mark, Ten and Lucas all departed from SM Entertainment in April 2026; Mark left NCT and his associated subgroups, while Ten remained with NCT and WayV. As such, only Kai and Taeyong remain signed to SM as of April 2026.

== Endorsements ==
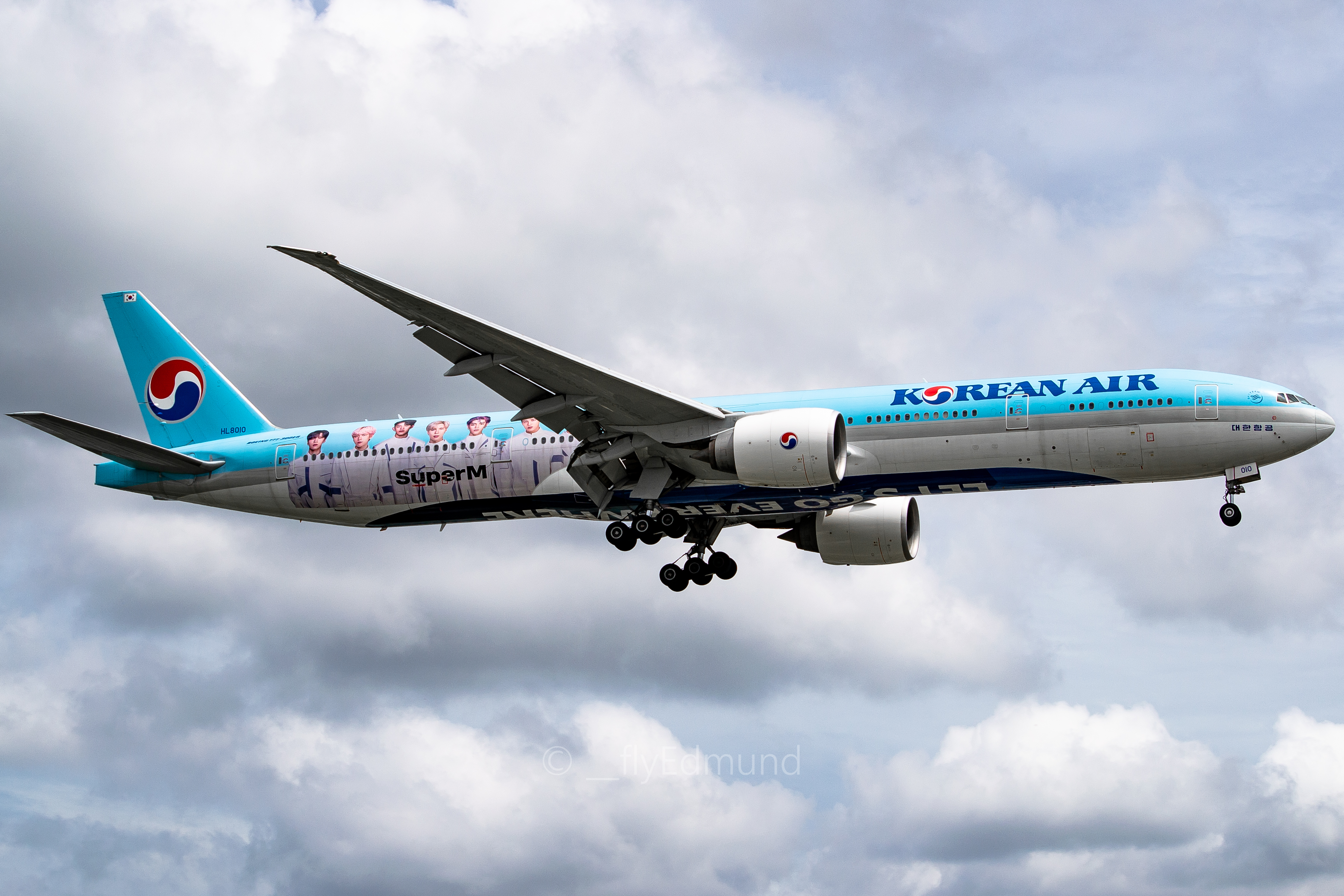
Korean Air's Boeing 777-300ER featuring SuperM

SuperM were announced as global ambassadors for Korean Air in November 2019. On November 4, the group was featured alongside SM labelmate BoA in Korean Air's safety video, which was added to all Korean Air flights on the same day. The song featured in the video, "Let's Go Everywhere", was released on November 18, and proceeds of the song were donated to Global Poverty Project's Global Citizen campaign.

Following their safety video feature, the group was also advertised through livery sported by one of Korean Air's Boeing 777-300ER, registered as HL8010. The livery is a picture of the group's seven members with the group's name logo below it and is situated at the aft part of the aircraft.

In January 2021, insurance company Prudential announced a collaborative campaign with SuperM called "We Do Well Together". The campaign encourages people to maintain good health and to spread positivity. As part of the campaign, the group released a promotional single, "We Do", which was released alongside its music video on April 9. Prudential hosted a virtual fan meeting and concert, with Taeyong, Ten, Lucas, and Mark attending due to Baekhyun and Taemin serving in the military and Kai being under self-quarantine after fellow Exo member Xiumin tested positive for COVID-19; Baekhyun, Taemin, and Kai appeared through pre-recorded video.

== Members ==
- Baekhyun (Exo) – leader
- Taemin (Shinee)
- Kai (Exo)
- Taeyong (NCT; NCT 127)
- Ten (NCT; WayV)
- Lucas (NCT; WayV)
- Mark (NCT; NCT 127, NCT Dream)

== Discography ==
=== Studio albums ===
List of studio albums, with selected details, chart positions and sales
Title	Details	Peak chart positions										Sales	Certification
Title	Details	KOR	AUS	BEL (FL)	CAN	FRA	JPN	JPN Hot	NZ	UK Dig.	US	Sales	Certification
Super One	Released: September 25, 2020 (US); Label: SM, Capitol; Formats: CD, cassette, digital download, streaming	1	82	175	69	73	7	8	40	29	2	KOR: 560,032; JPN: 4,019; JPN: 28,518 (Phy.); US: 107,900	KMCA: 2× Platinum

=== Extended plays ===
List of extended plays, with selected chart positions and sales
Title	Details	Peak chart positions							Sales
Title	Details	KOR	BEL (FL)	CAN	FRA	JPN	UK Dig.	US	Sales
SuperM	Released: October 4, 2019 (US); Label: SM, Capitol; Formats: CD, LP, digital download, streaming	3	130	38	— (Note: "SuperM" did not enter the Main Album Chart, but appeared at no. 11 on the component Digital chart.)	7	19	1	KOR: 170,102; JPN: 28,111 (Phy.); US: 228,000

=== Singles ===
List of singles, with selected chart positions, showing year released and album name
Title	Year	Peak chart positions								Album
Title	Year	KOR	KOR Hot.	CAN	FRA Dig.	JPN Hot.	NZ Hot.	UK Dig.	US World	Album
"Jopping"	2019	— (Note: "Jopping" did not enter the Gaon Digital Chart, but appeared at no. 108 on the component Download chart.)	84	85	140	27	24	96	1	SuperM
"100"	2020	—	94	—	—	35	—	—	7	Super One
"Tiger Inside"	2020	142	65	—	—	69	—	—	7	Super One
"One (Monster & Infinity)"	2020	—	96	—	—	54	—	—	7	Super One
"—" denotes releases that did not chart or were not released in that region.

=== Promotional singles ===
Title	Year	Peak chart positions		Album	Notes
Title	Year	KOR	US World	Album	Notes
"Let's Go Everywhere"	2019	—	23	Non-album single	Collaboration with Korean Air
"With You"	2020	—	—	Super One	Collaboration with Global Citizen for One World: Together at Home
"We Do"	2021	— (Note: "We Do" did not enter the Gaon Digital Chart, but appeared at no. 133 on the component Download chart.)	—	Non-album single	Collaboration with Prudential
"—" denotes releases that did not chart or were not released in that region.

=== Other charted songs ===
List of singles, with selected chart positions, showing year released and album name
Title	Year	Peak chart positions	Album
Title	Year	US World	Album
"I Can't Stand The Rain"	2019	10	SuperM
"Super Car"	2019	15	SuperM
"No Manners"	2019	20	SuperM
"2 Fast"	2019	24	SuperM

== Filmography ==
=== Music videos ===
Title	Year	Director	Ref.
"Jopping"	2019	Woogie Kim	
"Let’s Go Everywhere"	2019	Oui Kim	
"100"	2020	Woogie Kim	
"Tiger Inside"	2020	Yong-soo Kwon	
"One (Monster & Infinity)"	2020	Beomjin a.k.a. Paranoid Paradigm	
"We Do"	2021	Unknown	

=== TV shows ===
Year	Title	Network	Note(s)	Ref.
2019	SuperM - The Beginning	SBS	Debut reality show	
2020	M-Topia	Wavve	Travel reality show	
2020	SuperM's As We Wish	tvN		
2020	All That	Nickelodeon	Guest Stars; Episode "1122"	

== Concerts and tours ==
SuperM: We Are the Future Live
- World tour by SuperM
- Associated album: SuperM
- Start date: November 11, 2019
- Legs: 4
- No. of shows: 10 in North America; 1 in Latin America; 2 in Europe; 1 in Asia; 14 in total

SuperM concert chronology
- SuperM: We Are the Future Live (2019-2020); Beyond the Future (2020)

SuperM: We Are the Future Live is SuperM's first world tour, promoting their eponymous debut album. The tour was officially announced on October 2, 2019, with tickets going on sale on October 5, 2019. The tour began on November 11, 2019, in Fort Worth and initially visited nine cities in North America. An extension to the tour began on February 9, 2020, in Latin America, Europe, and Asia.

=== Set list ===
Set list of the first show in Fort Worth:

– VCR 1 – Intro

1. "I Can't Stand The Rain" + Dance Performance
2. "Danger" + "Goodbye" (Note: Taemin Solo)
3. "GTA" (Note: Taeyong Solo)
4. "Super Car"
5. "Dream in a Dream" + "New Heroes" (Note: Ten Solo)
6. "Bass Go Boom" (Note: Lucas Solo)
7. "Betcha" + "UN Village" (Note: Baekhyun Solo)
8. "Dangerous Woman"
9. "2 Fast" (Note: Taemin, Baekhyun, Lucas, Mark)
10. "Baby Don't Stop" (Note: Taeyong, Ten)
11. "Talk About" (Note: Mark Solo)
12. "Confession" (Note: Kai Solo)

Encore:

1. "No Manners" (Note: Taemin, Kai, Taeyong, Ten)
2. "With You"
3. "Jopping"

=== Tour dates ===
Date	City	Country	Venue
Leg 1 – North America
November 11, 2019	Fort Worth	United States	Dickies Arena
November 13, 2019	Chicago	United States	United Center
November 15, 2019	Duluth	United States	Infinite Energy Center
November 17, 2019	Fairfax	United States	EagleBank Arena
November 19, 2019	New York City	United States	Madison Square Garden
January 30, 2020	San Diego	United States	Viejas Arena
February 1, 2020	Inglewood	United States	The Forum
February 2, 2020	San Jose	United States	SAP Center
February 4, 2020	Kent	United States	accesso ShoWare Center
February 6, 2020	Vancouver	Canada	Rogers Arena
Leg 2 – Latin America
February 9, 2020	Mexico City	Mexico	Mexico City Arena
Leg 3 – Europe
February 26, 2020	Paris	France	AccorHotels Arena
February 28, 2020	London	United Kingdom	The O_{2} Arena

=== Cancelled shows ===
List of cancelled concerts, showing date, city, country, venue and reason for cancellation
Date	City	Country	Venue	Reason
April 23, 2020	Tokyo	Japan	Tokyo Dome	COVID-19 pandemic

== Awards and nominations ==
Name of the award ceremony, year presented, nominee(s) of the award, award category, and the result of the nomination
Year	Award ceremony	Category	Nominee/work	Result	Ref.
2019	Bravo Otto	Newcomer	SuperM	Nominated	
2019	Seoul Music Awards	Popularity Award	SuperM	Nominated	
2019	Seoul Music Awards	Hallyu Special Award	—N/a	Nominated	
2019	Seoul Music Awards	Bonsang Award	SuperM	Nominated	
2020	Newsis K-Expo Cultural Awards	Seoul Mayor Award	—N/a	Won	
2020	Indonesian Television Awards	Special Award	—N/a	Won	
2020	APAN Music Awards	Best Male Group	SuperM	Nominated	
2020	Golden Disc Awards	Album Division Bonsang	Super One	Nominated	
2021	Gaon Chart Music Awards	MuBeat Global Choice Award – Male	SuperM	Nominated	
