= Mingi (rapper) =

South Korean rapper (born 1999)

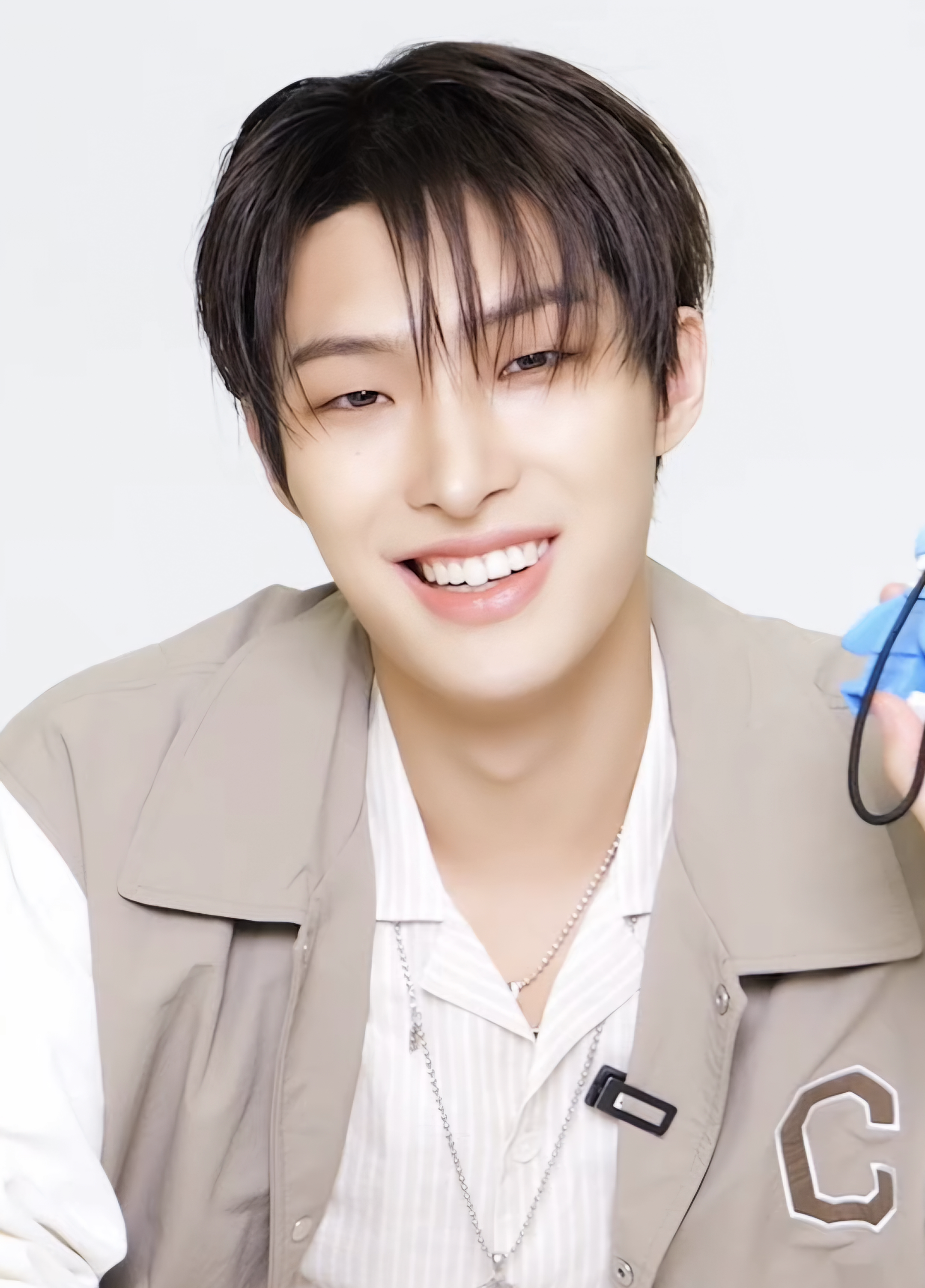
- Mingi in 2024
- Born: Song Min-gi; August 9, 1999 (age 27); Seoul, South Korea
- Education: Global Cyber University
- Occupations: Rapper; songwriter
- Musical career
- Genre: K-pop
- Instrument: Vocals
- Years active: 2018–present
- Label: KQ
- Member of: Ateez

Korean name
- Hangul: 송민기
- RR: Song Mingi
- MR: Song Min'gi

Song Min-gi (Korean: 송민기; born August 9, 1999), known mononymously as Mingi, is a South Korean rapper and songwriter. He debuted as a member of the boy band Ateez on October 24, 2018. He serves as the group's main rapper and dancer, as well as a songwriter, composer, and producer. He is known for his signature deep, raspy voice and his "Fix On" catchphrase, which has become a part of his personal brand.

== Early life ==
Song Mingi was born in Seoul, South Korea on August 9, 1999. At one time his family owned a sashimi restaurant. He attended Baekseok High School, before transferring to Suju High School. He later enrolled at the Global Cyber University.

== Career ==
=== 2017–2018: Pre-debut ===
Like his bandmates Hongjoong, Wooyoung, and Jongho, Mingi participated in the JTBC survival reality show Mix Nine, with the goal of debuting as an idol. He was eliminated in Episode 7, ranked 63rd among male contestants, and 113th place overall.

Like the other seven members of Ateez, Mingi was first introduced as a member of "KQ Fellaz," a pre-debut team of KQ trainees. They appeared in a dance cover video of rapper Famous Dex's song "Pick It Up." In 2018, a reality show titled Code Name is ATEEZ was produced to follow the group's activities leading up to debut.

=== 2018–present: Debut with Ateez and solo activities ===
Mingi debuted with boy group Ateez on October 24, 2018, with their debut EP Treasure EP.1: All to Zero. They were the first group to debut from KQ Entertainment. Mingi performs as the group's lead rapper and main dancer. He has also, with bandmate Hongjoong, contributed to writing many of the group's songs.

On August 7, 2024, Mirani released the single "Hit Me Up" featuring Mingi.

Mingi began releasing self-produced solo tracks under Fix Off: Desire Project series in 2024. On February 6, 2024, he launched the project by releasing his first self-composed song, "Tunnel", accompanied by a music video. On March 15, 2025, with "Autobahn", a track featuring Yunmin of the rock band Touched, with a music video. On May 4, 2026, Mingi released the pre-release single "NOVA" featuring Gaeko and Royal 44. On May 11, 2026, Mingi made his solo debut by releasing Fix Off Desire Project: Origin on digital and streaming platforms, followed by an exclusive vinyl physical release on May 18. It included a total of 7 tracks, combining previously released solo singles from his Fix Off project and new ones.

== Personal life ==
On November 15, 2020, Mingi's agency announced that he would be taking a hiatus from the group due to psychological anxiety problems. This led the group to produce several music videos without Mingi present, although he still assisted in the recording of their mini album Zero: Fever Part.2 and song "The Real" during this time. On July 18, 2021, after eight months of recovery, KQ Entertainment announced that Mingi would be resuming activity with Ateez.

== Other ventures ==
Mingi has been noted for his personal style. In June 2026 he unveiled a capsule collection with German luxury fashion brand MCM: MCM x Ateez with Mingi – Fix On. The capsule collection includes bags and clothing items decorated with Mingi's "Fix On" logo. As part of the promotion of this collaboration, Mingi appeared at the MCM Singapore pop-up on June 5, 2026. Also in June, Mingi attended the first men's creator presentation by Christian Louboutin at Paris Fashion Week, featuring Jaden Smith for the SS27 collection.

== Composition credits ==
All song credits are adapted from the Korea Music Copyright Association's database.

=== From (as KQ Fellaz) ===
- From

=== Treasure EP.1: All to Zero ===
- Pirate King (해적왕; Haejeog-wang)
- Treasure
- Twilight
- Stay
- My Way

=== Treasure EP.2: Zero to One ===
- HALA HALA (Hearts Awakened, Live Alive)
- Say My Name
- Desire
- Light
- Promise

=== Treasure EP.3: One to All ===
- Utopia
- Illusion
- Wave
- Aurora
- Dancing Like Butterfly Wings

=== Treasure EP.Fin: All to Action ===
- End of the Beginning
- Wonderland
- Dazzling Light
- Mist (안개; Angae)
- Precious (Overture)
- Win
- If Without You
- Thank U (친구; Chingu [lit. "Friend"])
- With U (걸어가고 있어; Georeogago isseo [lit. "I'm Walking"])

=== Treasure EP.Extra: Shift the Map ===
- Hearts Awakened, Live Alive (Expression Revisited)
- HALA HALA (Traditional Treatment Mix)
- Treasure (Soothing Harmonies mix)
- Say My Name (Flavor of Latin with Juwon Park)
- Illusion (Chillin' with Buddy mix)
- Wave (Ollounder's Bold Dynamics mix)
- Twilight (Classic Buddy mix)
- Promise (Notation from Senor 박주원)

=== Treasure Epilogue: Action to Answer ===
- Answer
- Horizon (지평선; Jipyeongseon)
- Star 1117
- Precious

=== Treasure EP. Map to Answer ===
- Better
- Star 1117 (Buddy's Melodic Mix)
- Sunrise (Atmospheric Mix by Spacecowboy)
- Wonderland (Sean Oh's Skrt Mix)

=== Zero: Fever Part.1 ===
- Fever
- Thanxx
- To the Beat
- Inception
- Good Lil Boy

=== Zero: Fever Part.2 ===
- Fireworks (I'm the One) (불놀이야; Bulnoriya)
- The Leaders (선도부; Seondobu)
- Time of Love
- Take Me Home
- Celebrate
- Take Me Home (English version)
- I'm the One (Heat-Topping version)

=== Loud: JYP x Psy (라우드) ===
- Say My Name

=== Zero: Fever Part.3 ===
- Eternal Sunshine
- Feeling Like I Do
- Deja Vu
- Rocky
- All About You
- Not Too Late (밤하늘)

=== Zero: Fever Epilogue ===
- Turbulence (야간비행)
- The Letter
- Still Here (Korean version)
- Better (Korean version)
- The Real (Heung version; 멋 (흥:興 Ver.))
- Wave (Overture)
- Wonderland (Symphony No.9 "From the Wonderland")
- Answer: Ode to Joy (featuring La Poem)

=== Don't Stop ===
- Don't Stop

=== Beyond: Zero ===
- Deja Vu (Japanese version)
- Rocky (Boxers version)
- The King
- Turbulence (Japanese version)
- Take Me Home (Japanese version)
- Fireworks (I'm the One) (Japanese version)

=== Mimicus OST ===
- Let's Get Together

=== The World EP.1: Movement ===
- Sector 1
- Cyberpunk
- Guerrilla
- The Ring
- WDIG (Where Do I Go
- New World

=== KCON 2022 LA Signature Song ===
- Poppia

=== The World EP.Paradigm ===
- Paradigm
- Cyberpunk (Japanese version)
- Guerrilla (Flag version)
- New World (Japanese version)

=== Lookism OST ===
- Like That

=== Spin Off: From the Witness ===
- Halazia
- Win (June One remix)
- I'm the One (Eden-ary remix)
- Take Me Home (Idiotape remix)
- Win (June One of Glen Check Remix)

=== The World EP.2: Outlaw ===
- This World
- Dune
- Bouncy (K-Hot Chilli Peppers)
- Django
- Wake Up (최면)
- Outlaw

=== 무제 (Untitled) ===
- MuJe (Untitled)

=== The World EP.Fin: Will ===
- We Know
- Emergency
- Crazy Form (미친 폼)
- Arriba
- Silver Light
- Dreamy Day (꿈날)
- Youth (by Yunho and Mingi)

=== Not Okay ===
- Not Okay

=== Golden Hour: Part.1 ===
- Blind
- Work
- Empty Box
- Shaboom
- Siren

=== Work Pt.2 - ATEEZ X Don Diablo ===
- Work Pt.2 ATEEZ X Don Diablo

=== Work PT.3 - ATEEZ X EDEN-ARY ===
- Work PT.3 - ATEEZ X EDEN-ARY

=== Work PT.3 - ATEEZ X G-Easy ===
- Work PT.3 - ATEEZ X G-Easy

=== Golden Hour: Part.1 'WORK TO LIVE' Ver. ===
- Arriba (Light version)
- Guerrilla (Flag version)
- Silver Light (Light version)
- Utopia (Finale version)
- The Real (Light version)
- I'm the One (Light version)
- Turbulence (Orchestra version)

=== Fix On/Off ===
- Tunnel
- Vortex (Cyberpunk Intro)
- Untitle

=== Hit Me Up by Mirani ===
- Hit Me Up (Ft. Mingi)

=== Golden Hour: Part.2 ===
- Deep Dive
- Ice on My Teeth
- Man on Fire
- Selfish Waltz

=== Ice on My Teeth (Festa Remixes 2) ===
- Ice on My Teeth (Double Pepperoni version)
- Ice on My Teeth (Tell Me Bye version)
- Ice on My Teeth (Olive Alive version)

=== Golden Hour: Part.3 ===
- Lemon Drop
- Masterpiece
- Now This House Ain't a Home
- Castle

=== Lemon Drop (Remix) ===
- Lemon Drop (Toppings Drift version)

=== Golden Hour: Part.3 'In Your Fantasy Edition ===
- In Your Fantasy
- "Roar" (Mingi solo)
- "In Your Fantasy" (Korean version)

=== Fix Off Desire Project 1 ===
- Autobahn (ft. Yunmin)
- Roar (Raiden Hard Techno version)
- Roar (DJ Wegun Billy the Kid version)

=== Last Summer OST ===
- Waiting for You

=== Ashes to Light ===
- Ash
- Face

=== Golden Hour: Part.4 ===
- Ghost
- Adrenaline
- NASA
- On the Road
- Choose

=== Adrenaline (Remix) ===
- Adrenaline (NO1 Ver.)

=== FIX OFF Desire Project: Origin ===
- Adrenaline (Fix On version)
- Nova (Ft. Gaeko, Royal 44)
- Dinero
- Dinero (Instrumental)

=== Golden Hour: Part.5 ===
- Bad
- Mamacita
- Toxin
- Fallin'
- Body
