= Alex Karlsson =

Swedish songwriter, producer, and singer

- Born: Alexander Magnus Karlsson
- Genres: K-pop; pop; EDM
- Occupations: Songwriter; record producer; singer
- Years active: 2017–present
- Label: EKKO Music Rights

Alexander Magnus Karlsson, known professionally as Alex Karlsson, is a Swedish songwriter, producer, and singer. He has worked on K-pop songs such as AleXa's "Bomb" (2019), BTS's "We Are Bulletproof: The Eternal" (2020), SuperM's "Tiger Inside" (2020), Enhypen's "Fever" (2021), TXT's "Loser=Lover" (2021), as well as ATEEZ's "Bouncy (K-Hot Chilli Peppers)" (2023) and "Work" (2024).

In 2023, Karlsson gave a talk titled "Has K-pop prepared us for the metaverse?" at the TEDx conference in Brunkebergstorg, exploring the theme of sense of belonging.

== Discography ==
=== As featuring / co-lead artist ===
Year	Song	Artist(s)	Album
2018	"Holy Water"	Navarra	Non-album single
2022	"Heart's On Fire"	IMLAY	Non-album single
2023	"CRUSH"	Kimotion, Alex Karlsson, Romain Saha	Non-album single
2023	"Gravity"	BELLMAN, Middle Milk	Non-album single

=== As producer / songwriter ===
All credits are adapted from Korea Music Copyright Association unless stated otherwise.

Year	Song	Artist(s)	Album
2013	"Holiday"	Henry	Trap
2015	"Ghost"	Alex & The Talai Lama	Ghost
2017	"Sunnuntaisin"	Janne Orden	Sunnuntaisin
2017	"Six Feet Underwater"	JeL	The Cold War Chronicles
2017	"Talk All Night"	JeL	The Cold War Chronicles
2017	"Crazy Enough"	JeL	The Cold War Chronicles
2017	"Long Gone"	JeL	The Cold War Chronicles
2017	"Funk Like We Used To"	JeL	Funk Like We Used To
2018	"Undercover"	Shinee	The Story Of Light
2018	"Moondance"	B.A.P	E.G.O
2019	"Slowing Me Down"	JeL	Slowing Me Down
2019	"Down 4 Life"	JeL	Down 4 Life
2019	"This Life"	Key	Face
2019	"Heads Up"	Super Junior	Time Slip
2019	"Human"	Yuta Sueyoshi	Wonder Hack
2019	"Rainbow"	Twice	Feel Special
2019	"Bomb"	AleXa	Bomb
2019	"Q&A"	Cherry Bullet	Let's Play Cherry Bullet
2019	"Miss Ping Pong"	GWSN	The Park In The Night Part Two
2019	"Dynamite"	Nicky Romero, Mike Williams, Amber Shepard	Dynamite
2019	"Fireflies"	NCT Dream	Fireflies
2020	"Ready or Not"	Momoland	Ready or Not
2020	"Chained Up"	Now United	Chained Up
2020	"Nanana"	MCND	Earth Age
2020	"호랑이 (Tiger Inside)"	SuperM	Super One
2020	"We are Bulletproof: The Eternal"	BTS	Map of the Soul: 7
2020	"Kitty Run"	AleXa	Do or Die
2020	"Head Above the Water"	Steve Forest, Te Pai	Head above the water
2021	"Addicted"	Baekhyun	Baekhyun
2021	"Good Time"	WayV	Kick Back
2021	"kasmala"	Alamat	Kasmala
2021	"Fever"	Enhypen	Border: Carnival
2021	"Mixed Up"	Enhypen	Border: Carnival
2021	"Tattoo"	AleXa	Tattoo
2021	"Follow Me"	Cherry Bullet	Cherry Rush
2021	"Keep Your Head Up"	Cherry Bullet	Cherry Rush
2021	"Loser=Lover"	Tomorrow X Together	The Chaos Chapter: Freeze
2021	"MOA Diary"	Tomorrow X Together	The Chaos Chapter: Freeze
2021	"Far"	NCT 127	Sticker
2021	"Flipping a Coin"	Billlie	The Billage of Perception: Chapter One
2021	"Tamed-Dashed"	Enhypen	Dimension: Dilemma
2021	"Blessed-Cursed"	Enhypen	Dimension: Dilemma
2021	"Attention, Please!"	Enhypen	Dimension: Dilemma
2021	"Drip Drop"	Ma55ive the Rampage	Drip Drop
2022	"Papercut"	SixTones	City
2022	"Chandelier"	Cravity	Liberty: In Our Cosmos
2022	"Snap Snap"	Red Velvet	Bloom
2022	"Arcade"	NCT Dream	Glitch Mode
2022	"Thursday's Child Has Far To Go"	Tomorrow X Together	Minisode 2: Thursday's Child
2022	"Paradoxxx Invasion"	Enhypen	Manifesto: Day 1
2022	"Bad 4 U"	Baekho	Absolute Zero
2022	"Taste The Feeling"	Tempest	On and On
2022	"Trigger"	CNBLUE	Let It Shine
2022	"Everyday"	Super Junior	The Road
2022	"Sunny Road"	NCT 127	Non-album single
2022	"Haven't Found You Yet"	Blue	Heart & Soul
2023	"Cat Call"	Sixtones	Koe
2023	"Parallel Parallel"	TVXQ	Parallel Parallel
2023	"Blah Blah"	The Boyz	Be Awake
2023	"Wild Heart"	Lun8	Continue?
2023	"This World"	Ateez	The World EP.2: Outlaw
2023	"Bouncy (K-Hot Chilli Peppers)"	Ateez	The World EP.2: Outlaw
2023	"We Know"	Ateez	The World EP.Fin: Will
2023	"Skateboard"	NCT Dream	ISTJ
2023	"Sacrifice (Eat Me Up)"	Enhypen	Dark Blood
2023	"Not Enough"	F.T. Island	Sage
2023	"True Romance"	F.T. Island	F-R-I-E-N-DS
2023	"Beam Me Up (3D)"	Superkind	Profiles of the Future (Λ) : 70%
2023	"Firework"	&Team	First Howling : Now
2023	"月が綺麗ですね (The Moon is Beautiful)"	&Team	First Howling : Now
2023	"Flash Forward"	Le Sserafim	Unforgiven
2023	"Nice & Slow"	Psychic Fever from Exile Tribe	Psychic File I
2023	"Till The Dawn"	Travis Japan	Road to A
2024	"Trainwreck"	Lee Jin-hyuk	New Quest: Jungle
2024	"Kick It"	WHIB	Eternal Youth: Kick It
2024	"Blind"	ATEEZ	Golden Hour: Part.1
2024	"Work"	ATEEZ	Golden Hour: Part.1
2024	"Work Pt.2 - Ateez X Don Diablo"	ATEEZ, Don Diablo	Work Pt.2 - ATEEZ X Don Diablo
2024	"Work Pt.3 - Ateez X Eden-ary"	ATEEZ, Eden-ary	Work Pt.3 - ATEEZ X Eden-ary
2024	"Work Pt.4 - Ateez X G-Eazy"	ATEEZ, G-Eazy	Work Pt.4 - ATEEZ X G-Eazy
2024	"Shock"	All(H)Ours	Witness
2024	"Road"	Hwasa	O
2024	"Hi-De-Ho"	INI	The View
2024	"Heart on the Window"	Jin, Wendy	Happy - :') (Remixes)
2024	"Candle Light"	The Boyz	Last Kiss
2024	"Dance Again"	Twice	Dive
2024	"The Heat"	Psychic Fever from Exile Tribe	Psychic File II
2024	"Gorgeous"	Tony Yu	Spatial Recorder
2024	"Today"	HiHi Jets	Today
2024	"Sweater"	Lil Ghost, Sueco	Sweater
2024	"Gotcha"	All(H)Ours	All Hours
2024	"I'm Okay"	AleXa	I'm Okay
2024	"Bye, Bye"	Mizuki	Bye, Bye
2024	"Choo Choo"	NCT Wish	Wishful
2024	"Right Now"	Lay Zhang	Step
2024	"Staring At The Sun"	Lay Zhang	Step
2024	"Human In You"	Lay Zhang	Step
2024	"I'm Still Learning"	Lay Zhang	Step
2025	"Skyfall"	Kino	Skyfall
2025	"Pitter-Patter-Love"	Fantasy Boys	Shine the Way
2025	"Under The Armor"	AleXa	Sugarcoat
2025	"Last Dance"	Eunhyuk	Timescape
2025	"Wolken"	Flaire	De Tijd
2025	"Masterpiece"	Ateez	Golden Hour: Part.3 'In Your Fantasy Edition'
2025	"Now This House Ain’t a Home"	Ateez	Golden Hour: Part.3 'In Your Fantasy Edition'
2025	"In Your Fantasy"	Ateez	Golden Hour: Part.3 'In Your Fantasy Edition'
2025	"Locked n Loaded"	Itzy	Girls Will Be Girls
2025	"Iconic"	Xikers	House of Tricky: Wrecking the House
2025	"Head Shoulders Knees Toes"	TWS	Play Hard
2025	"Trace"	Chanyeol	Hibi (日々)
2025	"Turned Up"	BAE173	New Chapter: Desear
2025	"SUPERPOWER (Peak)"	xikers	House of Tricky: Wrecking the House
2025	"dawns"	ARrC	HOPE
2025	"Til My Fingers Bleed (with DINO, Duckwrth & Telle)"	SEVENTEEN, The Word Alive and EWC featuring Duckwrth	Non-album single
2025	"DUM!"	MIRROR	Non-album single
2025	"NO Game Over"	IS:SUE	Extreme Diamond
2025	"Through the Line (feat. CAMO)"	Baekho	Rush Mode
2026	"NASA"	ATEEZ	Golden Hour: Part.4
2026	"DEAD MAN WALKING"	ALL(H)OURS	No Doubt
2026	"Light it Up"	NiziU	Good Girl But Not For You
2026	"HOTLINE"	&TEAM	We on Fire
2026	"Rise High Rise"	Xdinary Heroes	Dead And
2026	"Sand Castle"	INI	Non-album single
2026	"Pick Your Poison"	I-D, R.E.D and Jason Richardson	Non-album single
2026	"Aphrodite"	ZEROBASEONE	回帰LOVE (Kaiki Love)
2026	"(almost) perfect girl"	COLLAR	Persona
2026	"DANG DANG"	ALL(H)OURS	Unbound
2026	"0 (Young)"	KickFlip	Kick off the Wall Pt.1
2026	"Give Up The Ghost"	Xdinary Heroes	Impulse
2026	"u and me in arguments"	Xdinary Heroes	Impulse
2026	"Wait, Don't Go!"	ORKID	Non-album single
2026	"9 to 5 Problems"	Jeris Johnson	Butt Rock Billionaire
2026	"Butterfly Tramp Stamp"	Jeris Johnson	Butt Rock Billionaire
2026	"Gay Pride"	Jeris Johnson	Butt Rock Billionaire
2026	"Saturday Night (Mandarin Version)"	Lil Ghost	魁
2026	"PARTY'S OVER"	Sueco	Party's Over
2026	"BOTTLE AWAY"	Sueco with Red Leather	Party's Over
2026	"OUT OF YOUR HANDS"	Sueco	Party's Over
2026	"BUTTERFLY"	Sueco	Party's Over
2026	"GOING UNDER"	Sueco with Paledusk	Party's Over
2026	"ENEMY"	Sueco with blackbear	Party's Over
2026	"REARRANGING SCARS"	Sueco	Party's Over
