= Golden Hour: Part.3 =

- Digital cover

EP by Ateez
- Released: June 13, 2025
- Recorded: November 2024–May 2025
- Length: 14:05
- Languages: English; Korean
- Labels: KQ; RCA; Legacy

Ateez chronology
Golden Hour: Part.2 (2024)	Golden Hour: Part.3 (2025)	Golden Hour: Part.4 (2026)

Singles from Golden Hour: Part.3
- 1. "Lemon Drop" Released: June 13, 2025

Golden Hour: Part.3 'In Your Fantasy Edition'
- Digital cover

Singles from Golden Hour: Part.3 'In Your Fantasy Edition'
- 1. "In Your Fantasy" Released: July 11, 2025

Golden Hour: Part.3 is the twelfth extended play (EP) by South Korean boy band Ateez. It was released on June 13, 2025, through KQ Entertainment, RCA Records and Legacy Recordings. The EP continues the Golden Hour series and follows up the themes established in its predecessors. The EP's In Your Fantasy Edition was released on July 11, 2025.

== Release and promotion ==
On May 27, 2025, the band announced on their social media the third installment of their Golden Hour series, scheduled for release on June 13. The EP was described as part of the band "reclaiming their emotions" and "rediscovering what once connected them to themselves and others". Golden Hour: Part.3 features five songs, most of which were written by members Hongjoong and Mingi. To promote the release, Ateez held a press conference on June 12. Hongjoong explained that they had "worked hard over the past seven months to prepare this album", aiming to work just as hard "during promotions". Wooyoung added that the band tried to preserve "Ateez's unique colours" throughout the EP.

"Lemon Drop" was selected as the lead single, a track Hongjoong described as "an R&B hip-hop genre song with a refreshing vibe, containing Ateez's "sweet and tangy confession". Following the release of "Wave" in 2019, Wooyoung expressed his resurgent desire for the band to claim the title "Summer is Ateez", saying that they are "good at summer songs too". "Lemon Drop" debuted at number 69 on the Billboard Hot 100 earning them their first entry on the chart and being the third Korean boy band to reach this achievement.

The deluxe version of the EP, titled Golden Hour: Part.3 'In Your Fantasy Edition', was released on July 11, alongside the lead single "In Your Fantasy".

== Track listing ==
Golden Hour: Part.3 track listing
No.	Title	Lyrics	Music	Arrangement	Length
1.	"Lemon Drop"	Eden; Blssd; Maddox; Peperoni; Oliv; Hongjoong; Mingi	Eden; Blssd; Maddox; Peperoni; Oliv; Ollounder	Eden; Blssd; Maddox; Peperoni; Oliv; Ollounder	2:59
2.	"Masterpiece"	Eden; Maddox; Peperoni; Oliv; Alexander Karlsson; Hongjoong; Mingi	Eden; Maddox; Peperoni; Oliv; Door	Eden; Maddox; Peperoni; Oliv; Door	2:40
3.	"Now This House Ain't a Home"	Eden; Maddox; Peperoni; Oliv; Karlsson; Hongjoong; Mingi	Eden; Maddox; Peperoni; Oliv	Eden; Maddox; Peperoni; Oliv	3:45
4.	"Castle"	Eden; Maddox; Door; Peperoni; Oliv; Balm; Hongjoong; Mingi	Eden; Maddox; Door; Peperoni; Oliv; Balm; Kikoi; Levi	Eden; Maddox; Door; Peperoni; Oliv; Balm; Kikoi; Levi	3:09
5.	"Bridge: The Edge of Reality"	Eden; Maddox; Peperoni; Oliv; Door; Tankzzo	Eden; Maddox; Peperoni; Oliv; Door; Tankzzo	Eden; Maddox; Peperoni; Oliv; Door; Tankzzo	1:32
Total length:					14:05

Golden Hour: Part.3 'In Your Fantasy Edition' bonus track listing
No.	Title	Lyrics	Music	Arrangement	Length
6.	"In Your Fantasy"	Eden; Maddox; Peperoni; Oliv; Karlsson; Hongjoong; Mingi	Eden; Maddox; Peperoni; Oliv; Karlsson	Eden; Maddox; Peperoni; Oliv; Karlsson	3:12
7.	"NO1" (Hongjoong solo)	Hongjoong; Maddox	Hongjoong; Eden; Maddox; Peperoni; Oliv; Kikoi; Tankzzo	Hongjoong; Eden; Maddox; Peperoni; Oliv; Kikoi; Tankzzo	2:33
8.	"Skin" (Seonghwa solo)	Hongjoong; Seonghwa; Eden; Maddox; Peperoni; Oliv; Door; Kikoi; Balm	Hongjoong; Eden; Maddox; Peperoni; Oliv; Door; Kikoi; Balm	Hongjoong; Eden; Maddox; Peperoni; Oliv; Door; Kikoi; Balm	3:20
9.	"Slide to Me" (Yunho solo)	Hongjoong; Yunho; Eden; Maddox; Peperoni; Oliv; Tankzzo; Levi	Hongjoong; Eden; Maddox; Peperoni; Oliv; Tankzzo; Levi	Hongjoong; Eden; Maddox; Peperoni; Oliv; Tankzzo; Levi	2:47
10.	"Legacy" (Yeosang solo)	Hongjoong; Yeosang; Eden; Maddox; Peperoni; Oliv; Door; Tankzzo	Hongjoong; Eden; Maddox; Peperoni; Oliv; Door; Tankzzo	Hongjoong; Eden; Maddox; Peperoni; Oliv; Door; Tankzzo	3:02
11.	"Creep" (San solo)	Hongjoong; San; Eden; Maddox; Peperoni; Oliv; Door; Levi; Balm	Hongjoong; Eden; Maddox; Peperoni; Oliv; Door; Levi; Balm	Hongjoong; Eden; Maddox; Peperoni; Oliv; Door; Levi; Balm	3:11
12.	"Roar" (Mingi solo)	Mingi; Quaimo	Mingi; Quaimo; Long Drive; The Need	Mingi; Long Drive; The Need	2:34
13.	"Sagittarius" (Wooyoung solo)	Hongjoong; Wooyoung; Eden; Maddox; Peperoni; Oliv; Door; Kikoi	Hongjoong; Eden; Maddox; Peperoni; Oliv; Door; Kikoi	Hongjoong; Eden; Maddox; Peperoni; Oliv; Door; Kikoi	2:48
14.	"To Be Your Light" (Jongho solo)	Lee O-neul; Jongho; Tankzzo	Seo Dong-hwan; Koo Bon-am; Kim Seung-ho	Seo; Koo; Kim	3:30
15.	"In Your Fantasy" (Korean version)	Eden; Maddox; Peperoni; Oliv; Karlsson; Hongjoong; Mingi	Eden; Maddox; Peperoni; Oliv; Karlsson	Eden; Maddox; Peperoni; Oliv; Karlsson	3:12
Total length:					44:20

== Charts ==
=== Weekly charts ===
Weekly chart performance for Golden Hour: Part.3
Chart (2025)	Peak position
Belgian Albums (Ultratop Flanders)	62
Belgian Albums (Ultratop Wallonia)	2
French Albums (SNEP)	153
Hungarian Physical Albums (MAHASZ)	13
Japanese Digital Albums (Oricon)	5
Japanese Download Albums (Billboard Japan)	6
Portuguese Albums (AFP)	108
South Korean Albums (Circle)	1
Swiss Albums (Schweizer Hitparade)	72
UK Album Downloads (Official Charts)	5
US Billboard 200	2
US World Albums (Billboard)	1

Weekly chart performance for Golden Hour: Part.3 'In Your Fantasy Edition'
Chart (2025)	Peak position
Japanese Digital Albums (Oricon)	13
Japanese Download Albums (Billboard Japan)	12
Japanese Top Albums Sales (Billboard Japan)	57
South Korean Albums (Circle)	6
UK Album Downloads (Official Charts)	22

=== Monthly charts ===
Monthly chart performance for Golden Hour: Part.3
Chart (2025)	Position
South Korean Albums (Circle)	3

Monthly chart performance for Golden Hour: Part.3 'In Your Fantasy Edition'
Chart (2025)	Position
South Korean Albums (Circle)	27

=== Year-end charts ===
Year-end chart performance for Golden Hour: Part.3
Chart (2025)	Position
South Korean Albums (Circle)	36
US World Albums (Billboard)	8

== Certifications ==
Certifications for Golden Hour: Part.3
Region	Certification	Certified units/sales
South Korea (KMCA) POCA edition	2× Platinum	500,000^{^}
^{^} Shipments figures based on certification alone.

== Release history ==
Release history for Golden Hour: Part.3
Region	Date	Format	Version	Label
Various	June 13, 2025	Digital download; streaming	Standard	KQ
South Korea	June 13, 2025	CD	Standard	KQ
United States	June 13, 2025	CD	Standard	RCA; Legacy
Various	July 11, 2025	Digital download; streaming	In Your Fantasy Edition	KQ
South Korea	July 11, 2025	CD	In Your Fantasy Edition	KQ
United States	July 11, 2025	CD	In Your Fantasy Edition	RCA; Legacy
