= San (singer) =

South Korean singer and dancer (born 1999)

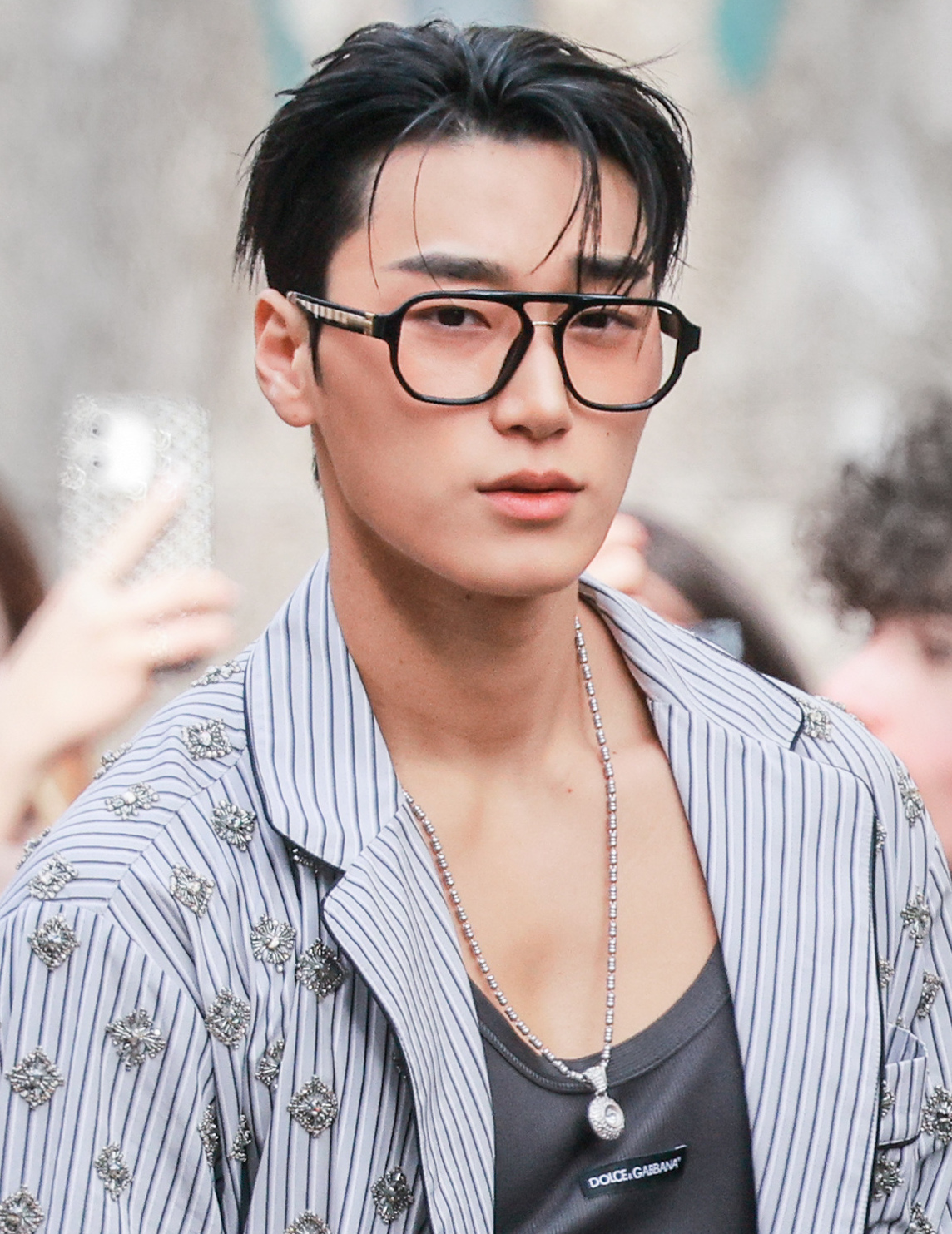
- San in 2026
- Born: Choi San; July 10, 1999 (age 27); Namhae, South Korea
- Education: Korean Arts High School; Global Cyber University
- Occupations: Singer; dancer; actor
- Musical career
- Genre: K-pop
- Instrument: Vocals
- Years active: 2018–present
- Label: KQ
- Member of: Ateez

Korean name
- Hangul: 최산
- RR: Choe San
- MR: Ch'oe San

Signature
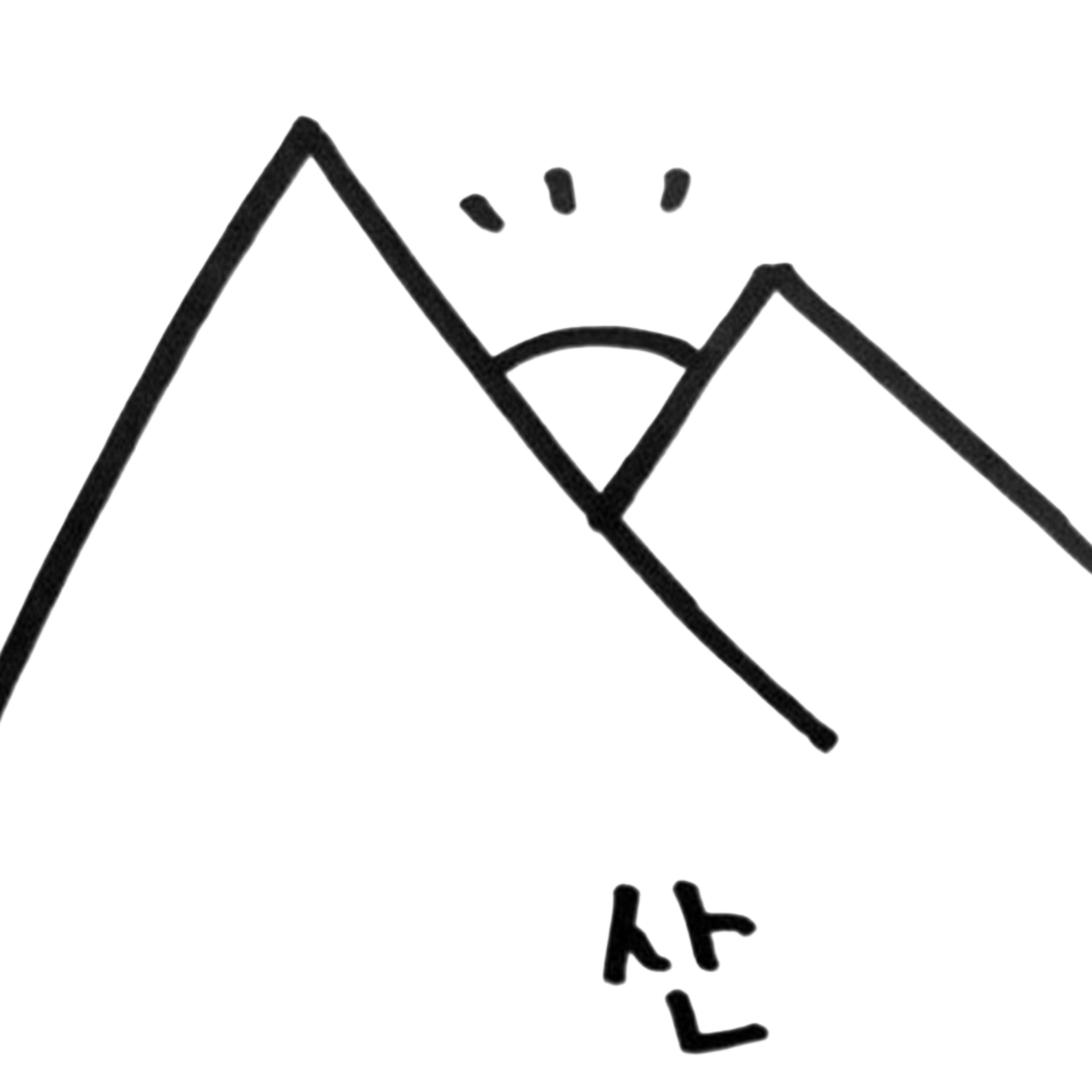

Choi San (Korean: 최산; born July 10, 1999), known mononymously as San, is a South Korean singer and dancer. He is a member of the boy group Ateez, formed by KQ Entertainment.

San made his acting debut in the in the 2021 KBS drama Imitation with bandmates Seonghwa, Yunho, and Jongho. He contributed his vocals to the official soundtrack of the drama as a member of "Sparkling", a fictional 4-member group.

In addition to his work with Ateez, San serves as a global ambassador for Dolce & Gabbana.

== Early life and education ==
Choi San was born on July 10, 1999, in Namhae, South Korea to mother Kim Nam-ji, and father Choi Jong-cheol. He attended Namhae Middle School and graduated from the Korean Arts High School.

San was introduced to KQ Entertainment by trot singer Na Sang Do, who is also his father's taekwondo student and the one who recommended him for an audition with the company.

== Career ==
=== 2017: Pre-debut ===
San was introduced as a member of the pre-debut group KQ Fellaz alongside seven others, who now all are members of Ateez.

=== 2018–present: Debut and activities with Ateez ===
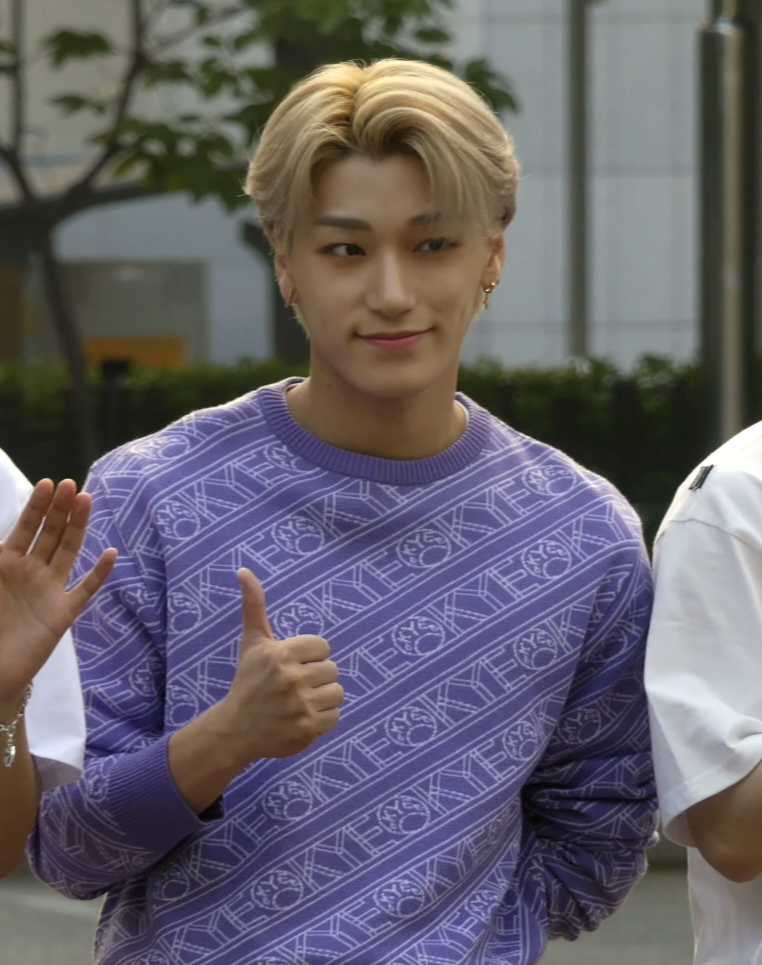
San in 2019

While San debuted with Ateez on October 24, 2018 as the group's lead vocalist, he is now also known as and referred to as one of the main dancers of the group.

San has contributed to Ateez's discography and choreography. In 2023, he co-wrote the song "It's You" with bandmates Wooyoung and Yeosang which appeared on the album The World EP.Fin: Will. In July 2025, his first solo song, "Creep", which he co-wrote, was released as part of the album Golden Hour: Part.3 'In Your Fantasy Edition.

During promotions for "Bad", San's performances attracted widespread attention online. His ending choreography and stage presence went viral across multiple social media platforms, including Instagram Reels and YouTube Shorts, receiving coverage from Korean media.

=== 2021–present: Actor debut and solo projects ===
In 2021, San made his acting debut in the web series "Imitation" with bandmates Seonghwa, Yunho, and Jongho; this marked his first acting role. In August 2021, San collaborated with Pentatonix on a remix of their song “A Little Space,” alongside fellow Ateez members Yunho and Jongho. The project combined elements of K-pop and Western a cappella music.

Between 2023 and 2024, San released song covers and a performance video. San's song "Snowflake" is an original track that highlights his vocal abilities. He has performed covers of "Breathe" originally by Lee Hi and "Dear Name" originally by IU, which he performed as a duet with bandmate Jongho. In November 2024, San appeared in the music talk show Lee Mujin Service where he delivered live vocal performances.

In June 2025, San made his first solo appearance on a talk-centered entertainment show on the show Naraesik, hosted by Park Na-Rae. Later in the month, San was invited to a Tag Heuer gala event in Seoul. In July 2025, San released his first ever official song "Creep" which featured in the album Golden Hour: Part.3 'In Your Fantasy Edition'. In October 2025, Dolce & Gabbana officially announced San as their Global Ambassador. In November 2025, San released an animated music video for his song "Creep", featuring a combination of live-action shots with digital painting. In December 2025, San appeared as a presenter for the 'Best Teamwork Award' along with Forestella's Go Woo-rim at the 2025 KBS Entertainment Awards.

In February 2026, San appeared on the South Korean variety show Boss in the Mirror as a Special MC. In 2026, he also participated in the choreography for Ateez's title tracks "Adrenaline" and "Bad". In August 2026, San performed the ceremonial kick-off at the Coupang Play Series match between Manchester City and Atlético Madrid at Seoul World Cup Stadium in Seoul.

In November 2026, it was announced that San would contribute vocals to the soundtrack of the SBS television drama Nine to Six, marking his first official drama OST participation since his debut. His song, "Not Like Lovin' Me", is scheduled for pre-release on November 18, ahead of the drama's premiere on November 25.

In 2026, San made several guest appearances on South Korean television programmes. He appeared on Running Man alongside actress Han Ji-eun, and featured on Omniscient Interfering View. He later appeared on Please Take Care of My Refrigerator with fellow ATEEZ member Wooyoung and singer Jisoo, and appeared in the sixth season of Midnight Horror Story. In November, he filmed an appearance on MBC's talk show Radio Star, marking the first appearance by an ATEEZ member on the programme; its broadcast date had not yet been announced. He was also announced as a participant in the second season of Good Day.

=== Choreography Contributions ===
In 2023, San's "Warriors" performance video, which he co-developed and co-choreographed, received praise from OSEN for its "diverse choreography composition" and from Single List for San's "detailed facial expressions that matched the mood of the song".

In 2024, San was credited with contributing to the choreography for the title track "Work" from the album Golden Hour: Part.1.

In 2026, it was announced that San participated in the choreography for the title track "Adrenaline" from the album Golden Hour: Part. 4. Hongjoong said, "San was involved throughout the choreography, which is how it came together". San explained, "To express 'Adrenaline' instinctively, I focused on movements that feel like blood rushing through your body, like tightening the neck or showing blood flowing".

In June 2026, San participated in the choreography for Ateez's title track "Bad" from the group's EP Golden Hour: Part.5, marking his latest choreography contribution to the group's discography.

In November 2026, San was credited alongside choreographer DUN for the choreography of "UP", the title track from Ateez's EP, Golden Hour: Part.6.

== Other ventures ==
=== Ambassadorship ===
On April 14, 2021, San was appointed as Public Relations Ambassador of Namhae, his hometown in South Gyeongsang Province, South Korea.

=== Endorsements ===
San collaborated with the brand Returnity to promote their acupressure ear sticker products. The digital campaign for this collaboration, won San and Returnity a Silver Prize at the ICT Awards Korea 2025.

In September 2026, San collaborated with cosmetics brand NARS for its "BE ICONIC" beauty campaign. The collaboration featured a beauty editorial showcasing three makeup looks using the brand's products, which was released through Vogue Korea and its digital cover..

The same month, San was selected as the promotional model for Everland's Halloween attraction "Blood City Zero: Hell Gate". He appeared in promotional content as a zombie character, including an interactive three-dimensional display installation at the attraction.

In November 2026, San partnered with Airbnb for its "Welcome to Halmiwood" campaign, which aims to transform grandparents' rural homes in South Korea into accommodation available through the platform. San appeared in a campaign video encouraging families to share stories about their grandparents' homes and highlighting the initiative's aim of promoting rural tourism.

Also in November 2026, San was named a "Friend of the House" by French luxury fragrance brand Kilian Paris. On November 16, he featured in the brand's holiday campaign, his first official campaign following the appointment.

=== Fashion ===
San was officially announced as the Dolce & Gabbana Global Ambassador in October 2025, stating "I am proud and excited to embark on this journey with Dolce & Gabbana, and I look forward to creating meaningful moments together".

San has participated frequently with Dolce & Gabbana, in events such as Milan Fashion Week and Dolce & Gabbana’s Alta Moda and Alta Sartoria shows.

In August 2026, San appeared in Dolce & Gabbana's Fall/Winter 2026 global advertising campaign, photographed by Steven Meisel. The campaign marked their first collaboration, and featured San as the brand's global ambassador. The campaign incorporated the house's signature motifs, including Sicilian imagery, black, lace, knitwear, denim and tailoring.

In September 2026, San attended Vogue World: Milano, held at the Galleria Vittorio Emanuele II on September 22 during Milan Fashion Week, wearing a tailored three-piece pinstriped suit by Dolce & Gabbana. On September 26, he attended the brand's Women's Spring/Summer 2027 fashion show, where he was seated in the front row as its global ambassador.

In October 2026, San attended the opening of the "LIGHT, FORM AND VISION: Roman Heritage in Dialogue with Korean Contemporary Art" exhibition, organised in collaboration with Italian luxury fashion house Bulgari and the SongEun Cultural Foundation in Seoul. The exhibition explored the relationship between Bulgari's B.zero1 collection and contemporary Korean art.

According to reports, his Milan Fashion Week appearances contributed to an Earned Media Value estimated at approximately US $2 million for the Spring/Summer 2025 event and US $7.5 million for the Fall/Winter 2025 event. For the Spring/Summer 2026 event, he generated US $912k EMV, via remote promotion, as he was unable to attend the event in person, as reported by brand-building agency, Karla Otto. This ranked him 12th in the Top Korean Influencers of Women's Milan Fashion Week SS26 on Instagram list, announced by marketing company Lefty.

San has also generated a Media Impact Value of US $5 million from the Fall/Winter 2025 event, as reported by Launchmetrics.

According to a report by influencer marketing platform Lefty, San generated approximately US$9.7 million in Earned Media Value (EMV) during Milan Fashion Week Spring/Summer 2027, contributing to Dolce & Gabbana's media impact. His EMV was reported to have increased more than fourfold compared with the Spring/Summer 2025 season.

Fashion publications have noted his stylistic approach, describing it as a blend of classical tailoring and modern elements.

=== Magazine features ===
San has appeared in various fashion magazines including Elle Korea and 10 Magazine. San was featured as a cover model for the August issue of Arena Homme Plus Korea with 6 different cover versions, showcasing 6 different Tag Heuer watches.

=== Philanthropy ===
San has supported local welfare initiatives in Namhae Village, including donations and has participated in community events such as the Namhae Spring Walk.

In March 2023, he donated ₩5 million, the maximum amount allowed, to his hometown of Namhae through the Hometown Love Donation Program. The local government indicated that the funds were intended for regional development and youth welfare projects.

In 2024, San made a second donation of ₩5 million through the same program. In recognition of his contribution, he received Hanwoo beef sets valued at ₩1.5 million from the local government, which he subsequently donated to 22 single-parent households in Namhae.

In 2025, for the third consecutive year, San donated ₩5 million through the Hometown Love Donation Program. He told News1, "As an ambassador for Namhae County, I want to continue to do things that can be of help to my hometown".

== Impact and influence ==
San's performances have received attention on social media, particularly through short-form video platforms. During promotions for "Ice on My Teeth" in November 2024, his performance and styling led to the nickname "Duke of the North" (북부대공), referring to a character archetype commonly found in Korean romance-fantasy fiction. In 2026, performances of "Bad" were widely shared on Instagram and TikTok, with clips of San's choreography generating reaction and parody videos. The attention led to the nickname "Duke of the South" (남부대공), a counterpart to his earlier "Duke of the North" nickname.

The attention surrounding San's performances coincided with a rise in the domestic chart performance of "Bad", which entered the Melon Top 100 at number 64 before rising to number 8. Korean media subsequently referred to the phenomenon surrounding San as the "Choi San syndrome" (최산 신드롬), while "Bad" continued to rise on the charts for more than a month.

San has frequently appeared on the Korean Business Research Institute’s male celebrity brand reputation rankings, which measure online searches and engagement. He also has ranked repeatedly in the combined male and female idol brand reputation lists.

San is known for his intense facial expressions and stage presence when dancing.

In 2026, he was ranked at number 87 on VMan SEA's "SEA 100" list, which consists of men who are influential in Southeast Asia.

== Personal life ==
His father is involved in disability-support sports in Namhae. San learned taekwondo from his father; a discipline he credits in a GQ interview with helping him stay flexible for dancing.

== Discography ==
=== Soundtrack appearances ===
List of soundtrack appearances, showing year released, and name of the album
Title	Year	Album
"Diamond" (as Min-su of Sparkling)	2021	Imitation Original Soundtrack
"Not Like Lovin' Me"	2026	Nine to Six Original Soundtrack

=== Other charted songs ===
List of other songs, showing year released, selected chart positions, and name of the album
Title	Year	Peak chart positions	Album
Title	Year	KOR DL	Album
"It's You" (Note: "It's You" is a track sung by San, Wooyoung and Yeosang.)	2023	84	The World EP.Fin: Will
"Creep" (Note: credited to Ateez, but the track is a solo by San.)	2025	150	Golden Hour: Part.3 'In Your Fantasy Edition'

=== Unofficial releases ===
Title	Year	Album	Ref.
"Snowflake" (눈꽃)	2024	Non-album single	

=== Songwriting credits ===
All song credits are adapted from the Korea Music Copyright Association's database unless stated otherwise.

Year	Artist	Song	Album	Lyrics	Music
2018	Ateez	"From"	Non-album single	Yes	No
2023	San with Wooyoung and Yeosang	"It's You"	The World EP.Fin: Will	Yes	No
2025	San	"Creep"	Golden Hour: Part.3 'In Your Fantasy Edition'	Yes	No

== Filmography ==
=== Television series ===
Year	Title	Role	Notes	Ref.
2021	Imitation	Son Min-soo		

=== Television shows ===
Year	Title	Role	Notes	Ref.
2025	Boys II Planet	Host	3rd Planet Master	
2026	Boss In The Mirror	Special MC		

=== Radio shows ===
Year	Title	Role	Notes	Ref.
2020	Idol Radio	Special DJ	Ep 472; with Wooyoung	
2020	Idol Radio	Special DJ	Ep 488; with Mingi	
2020	Idol Radio	Special DJ	Ep 539; with Hongjoong	

=== Web shows ===
Year	Title	Role	Notes	Ref.
2026	9트쫑	Host	YouTube channel with Wooyoung	

== Awards and nominations ==
Name of the award ceremony, year presented, award category, and the result of the nomination
Award ceremony	Year	Category	Result	Ref.
Elle Style Awards	2024	Best K-pop Icon Award	Won	
ICT Awards Korea	2025	Silver Prize (digital campaign) (Note: For San's collaboration with the brand Returnity.)	Won	
