= House of Tricky: Doorbell Ringing =

- Digital cover

EP by Xikers
- Released: March 30, 2023
- Recorded: 2022–2023
- Genre: Dance
- Length: 19:23
- Language: Korean
- Label: KQ Entertainment

Xikers chronology
House of Tricky: Doorbell Ringing (2023)	House of Tricky: How to Play (2023)

Singles from House of Tricky: Doorbell Ringing
- 1. "Tricky House" Released: March 30, 2023; 2. "Rockstar" Released: March 30, 2023

Music video
- "Tricky House" on YouTube
- "Rockstar" on YouTube

House of Tricky: Doorbell Ringing is the debut extended play by South Korean boy group Xikers. It was released on March 30, 2023, with "Tricky House" and "Rockstar" served as the EP's double lead singles. It reached number four on the Circle Album Chart and sold 97,857 copies in South Korea.

== Track listing ==
No.	Title	Writer(s)	Producer(s)	Length
1.	"The Tricky's Secret"	Eden; Hongjoong; Ollounder; Peperoni; Oliv; Maddox; Door; HLB	Eden; Hongjoong; Ollounder; Peperoni; Oliv; Maddox; Door; HLB	1:36
2.	"Doorbell Ringing"	Eden; Hongjoong; Ollounder; Buddy; Peperoni; Oliv; Maddox; Minjae; Sumin; Yechan; Leez	Eden; Hongjoong; Ollounder; Buddy; Peperoni; Oliv; Maddox; Leez	3:15
3.	"Tricky House" (도깨비집; Dokkaebijib)	Eden; Hongjoong; Ollounder; Buddy; Peperoni; Oliv; Maddox; Minjae; Sumin; Yechan; Leez	Eden; Hongjoong; Ollounder; Buddy; Peperoni; Oliv; Maddox	3:40
4.	"Dynamic" (淸亮(청량); Qīngliàng(Cheongryang))	Eden; Hongjoong; Ollounder; Buddy; Peperoni; Oliv; Maddox; Door	Eden; Hongjoong; Ollounder; Buddy; Peperoni; Oliv; Maddox; Door	3:44
5.	"Rockstar"	Eden; Hongjoong; Ollounder; Buddy; Peperoni; Oliv; Maddox; Minjae; Sumin; Yechan	Eden; Hongjoong; Ollounder; Buddy; Peperoni; Oliv; Maddox	3:19
6.	"Xikey"	Eden; Hongjoong; Ollounder; Buddy; Peperoni; Oliv; Maddox; Door; Minjae; Sumin; Yechan	Eden; Hongjoong; Ollounder; Buddy; Peperoni; Oliv; Maddox; Door	3:48
7.	"Oh My Gosh"	Eden; Hongjoong; Ollounder; Buddy; Peperoni; Oliv; Maddox; Door; HLB; Dwayne; Neko; Minjae; Sumin; Yechan	Eden; Hongjoong; Ollounder; Buddy; Peperoni; Oliv; Maddox; Door; HLB; Dwayne; Neko	3:48
Total length:				19:23

== Charts ==
Chart performance for House of Tricky: Doorbell Ringing
Chart (2023)	Peak position
Japanese Albums (Oricon)	6
South Korean Albums (Circle)	4
US Billboard 200	75
US World Albums (Billboard)	4
