= Golden Hour: Part.2 =

- Digital cover

EP by Ateez
- Released: November 15, 2024
- Genre: K-pop
- Length: 16:56
- Language: Korean
- Label: KQ; RCA; Legacy

Ateez chronology
Golden Hour: Part.1 (2024)	Golden Hour: Part.2 (2024)	Golden Hour: Part.3 (2025)

Singles from Golden Hour: Part.2
- 1. "Ice on My Teeth" Released: November 15, 2024

Golden Hour: Part.2 is the eleventh extended play (EP) by South Korean boy band Ateez. It was released on November 15, 2024, through KQ Entertainment, RCA Records, and Legacy Recordings. It consists of six tracks, including the title track "Ice on My Teeth". The EP also serves as the continuation of the Golden Hour series.

== Background and release ==
On Ateez's sixth debut anniversary on October 24, 2024, KQ Entertainment released a logo teaser video for which is about Ateez's eleventh EP along with its release date to be on November 15, on the group's social media accounts at 21:30 (KST). The next day at midnight (KST), KQ revealed the promotional map with various contents to start on November 1. On the same day, the EP's pre-order also started and would end on November 14.

On November 1, Ateez unveiled the tracklist of the EP which consists of six tracks including the title track "Ice on My Teeth". In addition, members Hongjoong and Mingi participated in writing the lyrics of the five songs. On November 8, the group released the preview of all the six tracks on their YouTube channel. On November 11, Ateez revealed the title poster of their EP's title track. The next day, they also revealed the music video poster of the title track.

== Track listing ==
Golden Hour: Part.2 track listing
No.	Title	Lyrics	Music	Arrangement	Length
1.	"Deep Dive"	Eden; Maddox; Door; Ollounder; Peperoni; Oliv; Kikoi; Hongjoong; Mingi	Eden; Maddox; Door; Ollounder; Peperoni; Oliv; Kikoi	Eden; Maddox; Door; Ollounder; Peperoni; Oliv; Kikoi	2:59
2.	"Scene 1: Value"	Eden; Ollounder; Maddox; Peperoni; Oliv; Door	Eden; Ollounder; Maddox; Peperoni; Oliv; Door	Eden; Ollounder; Maddox; Peperoni; Oliv; Door	1:01
3.	"Ice on My Teeth"	Eden; Maddox; Bl$$d; Ollounder; Peperoni; Oliv; Hongjoong; Mingi	Eden; Maddox; Bl$$d; Ollounder; Peperoni; Oliv	Eden; Maddox; Bl$$d; Ollounder; Peperoni; Oliv	3:03
4.	"Man on Fire"	Eden; Maddox; Max Levin; Kyle Scherrer; Ollounder; Peperoni; Oliv; Hongjoong; Mingi	Eden; Maddox; Max & Kyle; Ollounder; Peperoni; Oliv	Eden; Maddox; Max & Kyle; Ollounder; Peperoni; Oliv	3:15
5.	"Selfish Waltz"	Eden; Hongjoong; Maddox; Ollounder; Peperoni; Oliv; Mingi	Eden; Hongjoong; Maddox; Ollounder; Peperoni; Oliv	Eden; Hongjoong; Maddox; Ollounder; Peperoni; Oliv	3:23
6.	"Enough"	Eden; Maddox; Door; Ollounder; Peperoni; Oliv; Hongjoong	Eden; Door; Ollounder; Peperoni; Oliv	Eden; Door; Ollounder; Peperoni; Oliv	3:15
Total length:					16:56

== Charts ==
=== Weekly charts ===
Weekly chart performance for Golden Hour: Part.2
Chart (2024–2025)	Peak position
Austrian Albums (Ö3 Austria)	53
Belgian Albums (Ultratop Wallonia)	5
Canadian Albums (Billboard)	94
French Albums (SNEP)	5
German Albums (Offizielle Top 100)	6
Hungarian Physical Albums (MAHASZ)	14
Japanese Albums (Oricon)	3
Japanese Combined Albums (Oricon)	3
Japanese Hot Albums (Billboard Japan)	3
Polish Albums (ZPAV)	16
Scottish Albums (OCC)	2
South Korean Albums (Circle)	1
Swiss Albums (Schweizer Hitparade)	83
UK Albums (OCC)	4
UK Independent Albums (OCC)	4
US Billboard 200	1
US World Albums (Billboard)	1

=== Monthly charts ===
Monthly chart performance for Golden Hour: Part.2
Chart (2024)	Position
Japanese Albums (Oricon)	14
South Korean Albums (Circle)	4

=== Year-end charts ===
Year-end chart performance for Golden Hour: Part.2
Chart (2024)	Position
Japanese Albums (Oricon)	89
South Korean Albums (Circle)	15

Year-end chart performance for Golden Hour: Part.2
Chart (2025)	Position
US World Albums (Billboard)	6

== Certifications ==
Certifications for Golden Hour: Part 2
Region	Certification	Certified units/sales
South Korea (KMCA)	Million	1,000,000^{^}
South Korea (KMCA) POCA vers.	Platinum	250,000^{^}
^{^} Shipments figures based on certification alone.

== Release history ==
Release history for Golden Hour: Part.2
Region	Date	Format	Label
South Korea	November 15, 2024	CD; digital download; streaming	KQ
United States	November 15, 2024	CD; digital download; streaming	RCA; Legacy
Various	November 15, 2024	Digital download; streaming	KQ
