= Responses to the COVID-19 pandemic in July 2021 =

Aspect of viral disease pandemic

This article documents the chronology of the response to the COVID-19 pandemic in July 2021, which originated in Wuhan, China in December 2019. Some developments may become known or fully understood only in retrospect. Reporting on this pandemic began in December 2019.

== Reactions and measures in Europe ==
=== 19 July ===
- The British Government has lifted most COVID-19 restrictions on social gatherings, hospitality businesses and wearing masks in England. British Prime Minister Boris Johnson said it was the "right moment" to move to the final stage of England's map out of lockdown but urged members of the public to be cautious.

== Reactions and measures in South, East and Southeast Asia ==
=== 1 July ===
- The Malaysian Government has imposed an Enhanced Movement Control Order in most parts of Selangor and Kuala Lumpur from 2 July to 16 July to combat the COVID-19 pandemic.

=== 5 July ===
- Malaysian Health Minister Dr Adham Baba confirmed that eight percent of the Malaysian population (roughly 2,618,316 people) had completed two doses of COVID-19 vaccination.

=== 8 July ===
- The 2021 Southeast Asian Games that will be held in Vietnam has been postponed to 2022 due to the COVID-19 pandemic in Vietnam. The games are originally scheduled from 21 November to 2 December 2021.
- Japan's prime minister Yoshihide Suga announced that Tokyo's fourth state of emergency would come into effect on 12 July, considering that the city's daily covid infections hit a 2-month high, and only 15% of the population was fully vaccinated. Despite the public's fear that the Delta variant could have a significant impact, Suga promised that the 2020 Summer Olympics would start on 23 July as scheduled.

=== 14 July ===
- The Malaysian government has shut down a mass vaccination center in the state of Selangor after 204 medical staff and volunteers tested positive for COVID-19.

=== 14 July ===
- Russia is reported to sell Sputnik vaccines to tourists for €1,200 to €2,200 per dose.

=== 17 July ===
- The Malaysian Government ended the Enhanced Movement Control Order restrictions over eight districts in Selangor despite rising cases. Only four locations in Damansara, Ampang, Klang, and Batu will remain under EMCO until 31 July.

=== 19 July ===
- Armenia is reported to be a popular vaccine tourism destination for Iranians.

=== 30 July ===
- A state of emergency in Tokyo was extended until the end of August while the capital hosted the Olympic Games, and the Covid state of emergency was expanded to four more areas. Japan's Prime Minister Yoshihide Suga warned infections were spreading at an unprecedented rate as daily cases nationwide topped 10,000 for the first time.

== Reactions and measures in the Western Pacific ==
=== 5 July ===
- New Zealand Prime Minister Jacinda Ardern confirmed that the Trans-Tasman travel bubble pause with Australia will be lifted for Western Australia and the North Territory from 11:59 pm on 9 July but will remain in place for Queensland and New South Wales. New Zealanders stranded in Australia will be able to return to NZ from 11:59 pm on 9 July provided they meet a range of travel requirements.

=== 7 July ===
- The New Zealand health regulator Medsafe has granted provisional approval for the single-dose Janssen COVID-19 vaccine to be used on persons aged 18 years and above.

=== 8 July ===
- Fijian Prime Minister Frank Bainimarama has announced that it will be compulsory for both private and public sector employees to take a COVID-19 vaccine. Public servants will be sacked if they refused to take a COVID-19 vaccine.

=== 9 July ===
- Fiji has approved the use of the Moderna COVID-19 vaccine with the support of the United States under the COVAX programme for individuals 18 years and above as well as pregnant women.

=== 14 July ===
- New Zealand's COVID-19 Response Minister Chris Hipkins confirmed that the travel bubble pause with the Australian state of Victoria would be extended by two days until 21 July after the state confirmed 13 new community cases and extended its lockdown.

=== 23 July ===
- New Zealand Prime Minister Jacinda Ardern confirmed that the country's travel bubble with Australia would be suspended from 11:59 pm for the next eight weeks due to the spread of the SARS-CoV-2 Delta variant in several Australian cities and states. New Zealanders who return home from Australia except New South Wales before 11:59 pm on 30 July will not have to go into managed isolation. Those returning after 30 July will have to go into managed isolation.

== See also ==
- Timeline of the COVID-19 pandemic in July 2021
- Responses to the COVID-19 pandemic
