= Work (Ateez song) =

Single by Ateez

from the EP Golden Hour: Part.1
- Released: May 31, 2024
- Genre: K-pop
- Length: 2:52
- Label: KQ; RCA; Legacy
- Songwriters: Eden; Peperoni; Ollounder; Maddox; Oliv; Hongjoong; Mingi; Alex Karlsson
- Producer: Eden

Ateez singles chronology
"Not Okay" (2024)	"Work" (2024)	"Hush-Hush" (2024)

Music video
- "Work" on YouTube

"Work" is a song by South Korean boy band Ateez, released on May 31, 2024, as the lead single from their tenth EP, Golden Hour: Part.1, which was released on the same day.

== Music video ==
The music video was released alongside the single. It finds Ateez doing a variety of odd jobs, such as working at a diner and mining for gold. The choreography was co-created by San.

== Remixes ==
The song received three official remixes. The first, "Work Pt.2" with Dutch DJ Don Diablo, was released on June 5, 2024, while the second, "Work Pt.3" with their production team Eden-ary, was released on June 12, 2024. The third remix, "Work Pt.4" with American rapper G-Eazy, was released on August 9, 2024. In his verse, G-Eazy takes shots at his ex-girlfriend Halsey: "Actin' innocent, no, it's not your first time / We're far away if Libra is her sign / Oof, danger, danger (Danger, danger) / Don't be a stranger (Don't be a stranger) / She said no one can save her."

== Charts ==
Chart performance for "Work"
Chart (2024)	Peak position
New Zealand Hot Singles (RMNZ)	24
South Korea (Circle)	57
UK Singles Sales (OCC)	65
US World Digital Song Sales (Billboard)	1
