= Hush-Hush (Be:First and Ateez song) =

2024 single by Be:First and Ateez

Single by Be First and Ateez

from the album 2:Be
- Released: July 1, 2024
- Genre: J-pop; K-pop
- Length: 3:25
- Label: Avex
- Songwriters: Mitsuhiro Hidaka; Ollounder; Peperoni; Mingi; Chaki Zulu; Manato; Eden; Maddox; Oliv; Hongjoong
- Producers: Sky-Hi; Chaki; Eden

Be First singles chronology
"Masterplan" (2024)	"Hush-Hush" (2024)	"Royal" (2024)

Ateez singles chronology
"Work Pt.3" (2025)	"Hush-Hush" (2024)	"Work Pt.4" (2025)

Music video
- "Hush-Hush" on YouTube

"Hush-Hush" is a song by Japanese boy band Be First and South Korean boy band Ateez, released on July 1, 2024, as the fourth single from the former's second studio album 2:Be (2025). A remix with Japanese DJ Taku Takahashi was released on July 5, 2024.

== Composition and critical reception ==
The song features synth arpeggios and bouncy drums. Billboard Japan described the sound as "majestic".

== Charts ==
Chart performance for "Hush-Hush"
Chart (2024)	Peak position
Japan Hot 100 (Billboard)	1
US World Digital Song Sales (Billboard)	9
