= In Your Fantasy =

2025 single by Ateez

- Remixes cover

Single by Ateez

from the EP Golden Hour: Part.3 'In Your Fantasy Edition'
- Released: July 11, 2025
- Genre: K-pop; electro-R&B
- Length: 3:12
- Label: KQ; RCA; Legacy
- Songwriters: Eden; Maddox; Peperoni; Oliv; Karlsson; Hongjoong; Mingi
- Producer: Eden

Ateez singles chronology
"Lemon Drop" (2025)	"In Your Fantasy" (2025)	"Ash" (2025)

Music video
- "In Your Fantasy" on YouTube

"In Your Fantasy" is a song by South Korean boy band Ateez, released on July 11, 2025 from the In Your Fantasy Edition of their twelfth EP Golden Hour: Part.3 as the lead single. The EP includes both an English and Korean version of the song. It is their second song to enter the Billboard Hot 100, following "Lemon Drop", and their highest-charting entry on the chart, peaking at number 68.

== Composition ==
The song is composed of "heavy synth beats" and combines both singing and rapping from Ateez. The lyrics find them tempting one using their sexual attractiveness.

== Critical reception ==
Marty of The Honey Pop remarked "We would sit and talk about 'In Your Fantasy' lyrics, but then we'd have to mention every single line in it. Ateez made sure we'll be losing it every second of that song, and honestly, we applaud them for the success. Focus? Absolutely lost, and at the same time, entirely on them and 'In Your Fantasy.' In fact, we were so distracted (can you blame us?) that we almost didn't think about how the song fits into their lore." Maria Mata of Melodic described the song as "creating a soundscape that draws you into their temptation. The repetitive rhythm of the song feels purposeful, almost like a siren song with the clear intention to seduce; the blend of cutthroat rapping, powerful vocals and sultry whispers conjures up Ateez's spell." She added, "The track's tone has been sharply set, with daring words that constantly tease the listener. In a way, 'In Your Fantasy' is both bold and mysterious, never shying away from seduction, but leaving us thirsting for much more. It is an invitation to let go of all inhibitions and give in to pleasure, like being slowly lured into the dark side; there's a push and pull in between restraint and debauchery that is as dizzying as it is intoxicating. The sexier concept, despite being in line with Ateez's explosive live performances, is also another step forward stylistically and creatively, a shift in tone that Atiny has rightfully loved and embraced."

== Track listing ==
- CD – single
1. "In Your Fantasy" – 3:12
- CD – Yaeji version
1. "In Your Fantasy" (Yaeji version) – 3:22
- CD – speed up version
1. "In Your Fantasy" (speed up version) – 2:42
- CD – speed down version
1. "In Your Fantasy" (speed down version) – 4:15
- Digital download and streaming – remixes
1. "In Your Fantasy" (Yaeji version) – 3:22
2. "In Your Fantasy" (speed up version) – 2:42
3. "In Your Fantasy" (speed down version) – 4:15

== Charts ==
Chart performance for "In Your Fantasy"
Chart (2025)	Peak position
South Korea BGM (Circle)	84
South Korea Download (Circle)	82
UK Singles Sales (OCC)	12
US Billboard Hot 100	68
US World Digital Song Sales (Billboard)	1

== Release history ==
"In Your Fantasy" release history
Region	Date	Format	Version	Label	Ref.
United States	July 11, 2025	CD single	Original	KQ	
United States	July 11, 2025	CD single	Yaeji version	KQ	
United States	July 11, 2025	CD single	Speed up version	KQ	
United States	July 11, 2025	CD single	Speed down version	KQ	
Various	July 14, 2025	Digital download; streaming	Remixes	KQ	
