= Golden Hour: Part.1 =

- Digital cover

EP by Ateez
- Released: May 31, 2024
- Genre: K-pop
- Length: 17:22
- Language: Korean
- Labels: KQ; RCA; Legacy
- Producers: Eden; Ollounder; Peperoni; Oliv; Maddox; Door

Ateez chronology
The World EP.Fin: Will (2023)	Golden Hour: Part.1 (2024)	Golden Hour: Part.2 (2024)

Singles from Golden Hour: Part.1
- 1. "Work" Released: May 31, 2024

Golden Hour: Part.1 is the tenth extended play (EP) by South Korean boy band Ateez. It was released on May 31, 2024, through KQ Entertainment, RCA Records, and Legacy Recordings. It consists of six tracks, including the title track "Work". The EP also serves as the beginning of the Golden Hour series.

== Background and release ==
On April 21, Ateez released a promotional map with the release date and the title of the upcoming extended play, Golden Hour: Part.1, on their social media accounts following their performance at Coachella 2024. Additionally, the group's leader Hongjoong use a folding fan with the words "Golden Hour" inscribed in it.

On May 13, Ateez released the title poster of the EP's title track, "Work". The next day, the group unveiled the tracklist of the EP which consists of six tracks including the title track. On May 18, they released the intro video for their new series "Golden Hour" through their social media accounts. The released video attracted attention as it started with a sign with the EP name on it and listed various scenes that implied Ateez's musical footsteps, including Lightiny (the group's official light stick) and world tour posters. In particular, the calm narration maximized the emotional atmosphere of the video and left viewers thinking by asking the question "Could they be the real Golden Hours of our lives?" at the latter part of the video. On May 23, the group pre-released a behind-the-scenes video of the recording of the EP's title track. A preview video of all the EP's six tracks was released the next day. On May 28 and 29, Ateez released the first and second music video teasers of the EP's lead single, respectively. On May 31, Ateez released their tenth EP Golden Hour: Part.1 along with the lead single "Work" and its music video. A day before the release of their tenth EP, they held a media showcase at the Four Seasons Hotel Seoul in Jongno District where they talk and explain about the EP.

== Accolades ==
=== Listicles ===
Name of publisher, year listed, name of listicle, and placement
Publisher	Year	Listicle	Placement	Ref.
Billboard	2024	The 20 Best K-Pop Albums of 2024 (So Far): Staff Picks	7th	

== Track listing ==
Golden Hour: Part.1 track listing
No.	Title	Lyrics	Music	Arrangement	Length
1.	"Golden Hour"	Eden; Ollounder; Maddox; Peperoni; Oliv; Door	Eden; Ollounder; Maddox; Peperoni; Oliv; Door	Eden; Ollounder; Maddox; Peperoni; Oliv; Door	1:24
2.	"Blind"	Eden; Ollounder; Maddox; Oliv; Peperoni; Hongjoong; Mingi; Door; Balm	Eden; Ollounder; Maddox; Oliv; Peperoni; Alex Karlsson	Eden; Ollounder; Maddox; Oliv; Peperoni	3:18
3.	"Work"	Eden; Peperoni; Ollounder; Maddox; Oliv; Hongjoong; Mingi; Alex Karlsson	Eden; Peperoni; Ollounder; Maddox; Oliv; Alex Karlsson	Eden; Peperoni; Ollounder; Maddox; Oliv	2:52
4.	"Empty Box"	Eden; Ollounder; Oliv; Peperoni; Maddox; Hongjoong; Mingi; Door; Balm	Eden; Ollounder; Oliv; Peperoni; Maddox; Door	Eden; Ollounder; Oliv; Peperoni; Maddox	3:33
5.	"Shaboom"	Eden; Oliv; Ollounder; Maddox; Peperoni; Hongjoong; Mingi; Door; Balm	Eden; Oliv; Ollounder; Maddox; Peperoni	Eden; Oliv; Ollounder; Maddox; Peperoni	3:31
6.	"Siren"	Eden; Ollounder; Maddox; Peperoni; Oliv; Door; Hongjoong; Mingi	Eden; Ollounder; Maddox; Peperoni; Oliv; Door	Eden; Ollounder; Maddox; Peperoni; Oliv; Door	2:44
Total length:					17:22

== Charts ==
=== Weekly charts ===
Chart performance for Golden Hour: Part.1
Chart (2024)	Peak position
Austrian Albums (Ö3 Austria)	68
Belgian Albums (Ultratop Flanders)	25
Belgian Albums (Ultratop Wallonia)	3
Croatian International Albums (HDU)	4
Danish Albums (Hitlisten)	35
French Albums (SNEP)	4
German Albums (Offizielle Top 100)	6
Hungarian Albums (MAHASZ)	28
Japanese Albums (Oricon)	1
Japanese Combined Albums (Oricon)	1
Japanese Hot Albums (Billboard Japan)	1
Lithuanian Albums (AGATA)	68
Portuguese Albums (AFP)	96
Scottish Albums (Official Charts)	1
South Korean Albums (Circle)	1
Swedish Physical Albums (Sverigetopplistan)	8
Swiss Albums (Schweizer Hitparade)	100
UK Albums (Official Charts)	4
UK Independent Albums (Official Charts)	1
US Billboard 200	2
US World Albums (Billboard)	1

=== Monthly charts ===
Monthly chart performance for Golden Hour: Part. 1
Chart (2024)	Position
Japanese Albums (Oricon)	5
South Korean Albums (Circle)	1

=== Year-end charts ===
Year-end chart performance for Golden Hour: Part.1
Chart (2024)	Position
Japanese Albums (Oricon)	65
South Korean Albums (Circle)	11

== Certifications ==
Certifications for Golden Hour: Part. 1
Region	Certification	Certified units/sales
Japan (RIAJ)	Gold	100,000^{^}
South Korea (KMCA)	Million	1,000,000^{^}
^{^} Shipments figures based on certification alone.

== Release history ==
Release history for Golden Hour: Part.1
Region	Date	Format	Label
South Korea	May 31, 2024	CD; digital download; streaming	KQ
United States	May 31, 2024	CD; digital download; streaming	RCA; Legacy
Various	May 31, 2024	Digital download; streaming	KQ
