= Lemon Drop (song) =

- Remixes cover

Single by Ateez

from the EP Golden Hour: Part.3
- Released: June 13, 2025
- Genre: R&B; hip-hop
- Length: 2:59
- Label: KQ; RCA; Legacy
- Composers: Eden; Blssd; Maddox; Peperoni; Oliv; Ollounder
- Lyricists: Eden; Blssd; Maddox; Peperoni; Oliv; Ollounder; Hongjoong; Mingi

Ateez singles chronology
| "Ice on My Teeth" (2024) | "Lemon Drop" (2025) | "In Your Fantasy" (2025) |

Music video
- "Lemon Drop" on YouTube

"Lemon Drop" is a song by South Korean boy band Ateez. It was released on June 13, 2025 as the lead single from their twelfth EP Golden Hour: Part.3, which was released on the same day. It is their first song to enter the Billboard Hot 100, peaking at number 69.

== Background ==
At a news conference in Mapo District, Seoul on June 12, 2025, Yunho stated "We already had a summer song, 'Wave'. But with 'Lemon Drop,' we wanted to show a bit more mature side of us, different from what we have tried". Hongjoong has said that the song would "color the hot summer days with Ateez style". In an interview with Forbes, Hongjoong said that "Ateez always enjoys switching things up and trying new styles, and 'Lemon Drop' felt like the right way to bring our own Ateez-style freshness into the season" and "We also hope it brings a bit of mood-lifting energy to anyone who listens to it." Ateez has compared the musical style and atmosphere of "Lemon Drop" to the cocktail of the same name; Wooyoung deemed it "sweet but with a little kick" and also told Clash, "I remember having so much fun during recording, especially the part where I say 'Cheers to this night, raise your glass.' That line really captures the fun energy of the song."

Ateez released remixes of the song on June 16, 2025.

== Composition ==
The song blends R&B and hip-hop. Lyrically, the song is about the thrill of instantly falling in love, as Ateez members detail their attraction to the subject.

== Critical reception ==
Marty of The Honey Pop called "Lemon Drop" the "song of the summer", further remarking that "Ateez invited us to this private summer party, and we're accepting the invitation. But seriously, the amount of sexy that the guys poured into ‘Lemon Drop’ while keeping a fresh vibe is insane. The song teleports us to those hot summer nights where we feel free from the hardships of our daily lives, where we forget our worries and simply exist to enjoy the moment. Yes, all we need to do is press play, and suddenly everything feels better."

== Music video ==
The music video premiered alongside the single. It opens with spinning fans, washing machines with in operation with clothes tumbling in side, and lemon slices floating in water on the screen of an old-school TV. The visual then focuses on the expressions of Ateez members, before showing "dripping wet clothes, scattered water droplets, and a steamy bathroom floor". The members are seen washing cars, dancing, cruising around and going to the pool.

== Track listing ==
- CD – single
1. "Lemon Drop" – 2:59
- CD – Toppings drift version
1. "Lemon Drop" (Toppings drift version) – 3:05
- CD – speed up version
1. "Lemon Drop" (speed up version) – 2:36
- CD – speed down version
1. "Lemon Drop" (speed down version) – 3:27
- Digital download and streaming – remixes
1. "Lemon Drop" (Toppings drift version) – 3:05
2. "Lemon Drop" (speed up version) – 2:36
3. "Lemon Drop" (speed down version) – 3:27

== Charts ==
Chart performance for "Lemon Drop"
| Chart (2025) | Peak position |
|---|---|
| New Zealand Hot Singles (RMNZ) | 22 |
| Singapore Regional (RIAS) | 15 |
| South Korea BGM (Circle) | 7 |
| South Korea Download (Circle) | 7 |
| UK Singles Sales (OCC) | 66 |
| US Billboard Hot 100 | 69 |
| US World Digital Song Sales (Billboard) | 1 |

== Release history ==
"Lemon Drop" release history
| Region | Date | Format | Version | Label | Ref. |
|---|---|---|---|---|---|
| United States | June 13, 2025 | CD single | Original | KQ | |
| United States | June 13, 2025 | CD single | Toppings drift version | KQ | |
| United States | June 13, 2025 | CD single | Speed up version | KQ | |
| United States | June 13, 2025 | CD single | Speed down version | KQ | |
| Various | June 16, 2025 | Digital download; streaming | Remixes | KQ | |
