= Ice on My Teeth =

Single by Ateez

from the EP Golden Hour: Part.2
- Released: November 15, 2024
- Genre: K-pop; hip-hop
- Length: 3:03
- Label: KQ; RCA; Legacy
- Songwriters: Eden; Maddox; Bl$$d; Ollounder; Peperoni; Oliv; Hongjoong; Mingi
- Producer: Eden

Ateez singles chronology
"Birthday" (2024)	"Ice on My Teeth" (2024)	"Lemon Drop" (2025)

Music video
- "Ice on My Teeth" on YouTube

"Ice on My Teeth" is a song by South Korean boy band Ateez, released on November 15, 2024, as the lead single from their eleventh EP, Golden Hour: Part.2, which was released on the same day.

== Background ==
In an interview with Consequence, Yunho said "'Ice on My Teeth' is really special to us because it's all about knowing your worth and owning that confidence. It's about valuing yourself no matter what and showing the world that you're not afraid to stand out." Yeosang added, "When I first heard the song, the catchy melody immediately grabbed my attention. The strong beat mixed with the violin made it sound fresh and exciting."

== Composition ==
The song contains violin, paired with an R&B foundation.

== Critical reception ==
Marty of The Honey Pop remarked the song "makes us lose our minds in the best ways possible" and "The sound this title track offers is definitely new and going to leave a mark. The members' vocals smoothly match the dark aura, showing a cooler, more chill yet mature vibe to them. And they don't miss the chance to transfer that vibe into their music video." He added, "Yunho starting the song in such an iconic way already makes 'Ice on My Teeth' unforgettable. Meanwhile, Hongjoong and Mingi leave us absolutely amazed with their parts as usual. And later, when Jongho enters the song at just the right moment with just the right tone, he manages to smoothly transition the feel, giving it a more epic aura. Yet, we never lose the dramatic atmosphere that 'Ice on My Teeth' offers. We mentioned smooth a few times already, and we're about to do it again, this time in regards to that fantastic choreography. We also can't stress enough how obsessed we are with Wooyoung's whole look and dance moves during his center parts. Or how Yeosang and Seonghwa completely reign during their parts. Or when San…" Joseph Kocharian of Rolling Stone UK wrote the song has the "sexiness and production value similar to Justin Timberlake's much lauded noughties 'Futuresex/LoveSound'" and "As the group evolve, so has the depth and range of their vocals. Mingi and Hongjoong both temper their usually more energetic rap styles, melting them to a more mellow sound to give a sexier energy to things."

== Music video ==
The music video was released alongside the single. It sees the Ateez members in "museum halls, stately homes with balaclava'ed ballerinas, flaming bonfires and cooly-lensed opulence". The clip opens with Yunho and Yeosang at a tennis court. Later, Wooyoung leads a choreographed dance break and San swings from a chandelier.

== Charts ==
Chart performance for "Ice on My Teeth"
Chart (2024)	Peak position
New Zealand Hot Singles (RMNZ)	25
Singapore Regional (RIAS)	30
South Korea (Circle)	97
UK Singles Sales (OCC)	12
US World Digital Song Sales (Billboard)	3
