= Xikers =

South Korean boy band

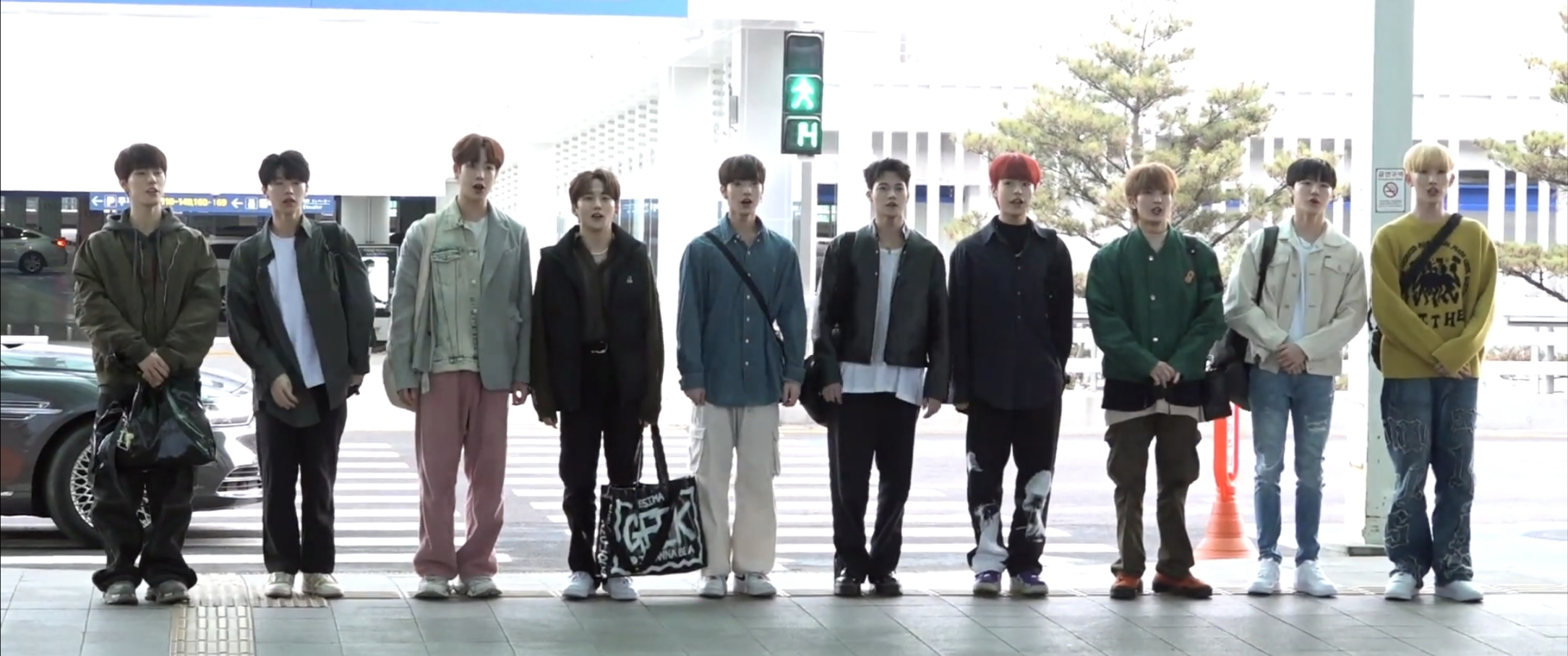
- Xikers in March 2023; L-R: Jinsik, Hyunwoo, Hunter, Minjae, Yujun, Junmin, Yechan, Sumin, Junghoon, and Seeun

Background information
- Also known as: KQ Fellaz 2 (2022–2023)
- Origin: Seoul, South Korea
- Genres: K-pop; dance pop
- Years active: 2023–present
- Label: KQ
- Members: Minjae; Junmin; Sumin; Jinsik; Hyunwoo; Junghoon; Seeun; Yujun; Hunter; Yechan
- Website: kqent.com/producer/2300

Xikers (Korean: 싸이커스; RR: Ssaikeoseu; stylized in all lowercase) is a South Korean boy band formed by KQ Entertainment. The group consists of ten members: Minjae, Junmin, Sumin, Jinsik, Hyunwoo, Junghoon, Seeun, Yujun, Hunter, and Yechan. They debuted on March 30, 2023, with the extended play (EP) House of Tricky: Doorbell Ringing.

== Name ==
Xikers derive their name from a combination of the letter "x", symbolizing coordinates, and the word "hiker", meaning traveler. Altogether, the group name's refers to "boys who travel through time and space in search of coordinates".

== History ==
=== Formation and pre-debut activities ===
In late 2018, Yechan competed under his full name on MBC's reality competition survival show Under Nineteen. However, he was eliminated and placed at rank 15 in the final episode.

In August 2022, KQ Entertainment published interviews of ten trainees on their YouTube channel: Minjae and Junmin on August 15, Sumin and Jinsik on August 16, Hyunwoo and Junghoon on August 17, Seeun and Hunter on August 18, Yujun and Yechan on August 19. The group was known as KQ Fellaz 2 prior to debuting. On August 20, KQ Entertainment released a YouTube video featuring all ten members together for the first time performing choreography to "Iffy" by Chris Brown. On August 23, the group premiered their pre-debut web series Ready to One, which follows the members as they train in Los Angeles, California.

In September 2022, for the finale of Ready to One, KQ Fellaz 2 released the music video for "Geek", a song composed and produced by Minjae. The video paid homage to the self-composed song "From" by labelmates Ateez and was uploaded to KQ Entertainment's YouTube channel on September 17. KQ Fellaz 2's first reality show, The Player: KPOP Quest, premiered on the same day.

=== 2023: Group name reveal, debut and House of Tricky series ===
On February 24, 2023, KQ Entertainment unveiled KQ Fellaz 2's group name as Xikers and opened the group's official social media accounts.

In March 2023, Xikers announced that they would debut on March 30. On March 15, it was announced that the group would hold a showcase the day before their debut at the SBS Prism Tower Auditorium and that it would also be broadcast live on KQ Entertainment's YouTube channel. On March 30, Xikers released their debut extended play, House of Tricky: Doorbell Ringing and its double lead singles "Tricky House" and "Rockstar". The album peaked at number four on the weekly Circle Album Chart and sold 97,857 copies. In its first week, the album sold over 100,000 copies, the fifth-highest first week sales figure for a debut album in South Korea on the Hanteo Chart in 2023.

On May 4, 2023, it was announced that member Junghoon had ruptured his cruciate ligament in his knee, requiring surgery, after which he would be on hiatus.

In July 2023, Xikers announced their first comeback on August 2. On July 10, Xikers revealed the title of their second extended play on their official social media accounts. On August 2, Xikers released their second extended play, House of Tricky: How to Play and its double lead singles "Do or Die" and "Home Boy".

=== 2024–2025: Continuation of House of Tricky series and Japanese debut ===
In February 2024, KQ announced that Xikers would release a new album sometime in March. On February 12, Xikers revealed the title of their third extended play to be House of Tricky: Trial and Error and the release date which is on March 8.

In July 2024, Xikers announced the release of their first Japanese single "Tsuki (Lunatic)" on August 7, ahead of their official Japanese debut.

In August 2024, Xikers announced that they are set to release their fourth EP, House of Tricky: Watch Out on September 6, featuring the title track "Witch".

On December 20, 2024, KQ Entertainment announced that member Junghoon would be returning to group activities at the beginning of January 2025 following his extended hiatus.

The group released their fifth EP House of Tricky: Spur on April 4, 2025, featuring the title track "Breathe". This release also involved member Junghoon, who was on a two-year hiatus due to injuries and was not involved in the group's previous releases after their debut EP.

On October 31, 2025, Xikers released their sixth EP, House of Tricky: Wrecking the House, which set a new record by selling 320,000 copies during its first week of release, nearly doubling the copies of their previous album.

=== 2026–present: Route Zero: The Ora ===
On April 21, 2026, KQ Entertainment announced the release of the Xikers' seventh EP, titled Route Zero: The Ora, via a teaser poster on the group's social media. The poster featured imagery of bare branches, a gravestone, and a silhouette of a dokkaebi. This release marks the beginning of a new narrative series for the group, following the conclusion of the House of Tricky series which had been used since their debut. The EP is scheduled for release on May 19, 2026. Following the comeback, they will hold their second fan meeting, "Roadymap to Univerxity", with performances at the Ticketlink 1975 Theater in Seoul on June 27 and Zepp Haneda in Tokyo on July 31.

== Members ==
- Minjae (민재) – leader
- Junmin (준민)
- Sumin (수민)
- Jinsik (진식)
- Hyunwoo (현우)
- Junghoon (정훈)
- Seeun (세은)
- Yujun (유준)
- Hunter (헌터)
- Yechan (예찬)

== Discography ==
=== Extended plays ===
List of extended plays, showing selected details, selected chart positions, sales figures and certification
Title	Details	Peak chart positions					Sales	Certifications
Title	Details	KOR	JPN	JPN Hot	US	US World	Sales	Certifications
House of Tricky: Doorbell Ringing	Released: March 30, 2023; Labels: KQ Entertainment, Kakao Entertainment; Formats: CD, digital download, streaming	4	6	15	75	4	KOR: 155,928; JPN: 3,259	
House of Tricky: How to Play	Released: August 2, 2023; Labels: KQ Entertainment, Kakao Entertainment; Formats: CD, digital download, streaming; Track listing: 1. "Skater"; 2. "Home Boy"; 3. "Do or Die"; 4. "Koong"; 5. "Run"; 6. "Sunny Side"	4	14	13	—	9	KOR: 250,000; JPN: 8,058	KMCA: Platinum
House of Tricky: Trial and Error	Released: March 8, 2024; Labels: KQ Entertainment, Kakao Entertainment; Formats: CD, digital download, streaming; Track listing: 1. "Trial and Error (Whereabouts)"; 2. "We Don't Stop"; 3. "Red Sun"; 4. "Supercalifragilistic"; 5. "Every Flavor Jelly" (온갖 맛이 나는 젤리); 6. "Break a Leg"	2	12	9	73	1	KOR: 230,240; JPN: 4,998	
House of Tricky: Watch Out	Released: September 6, 2024; Labels: KQ Entertainment, Kakao Entertainment; Formats: CD, digital download, streaming; Track listing: 1. "Watch Out"; 2. "Witch" (위치); 3. "Back Off"; 4. "Bittersweet"; 5. "Sand Castle"; 6. "Hang Around"	6	12	16	—	6	KOR: 190,155; JPN: 6,323	
House of Tricky: Spur	Released: April 4, 2025; Labels: KQ Entertainment, Kakao Entertainment; Formats: CD, digital download, streaming; Track listing: 1. "You Hide We Seek"; 2. "Breathe"; 3. "Highway"; 4. "Roller Coaster"; 5. "Rock Your Body"	2	—	—	—	3	KOR: 183,273	
House of Tricky: Wrecking the House	Released: October 31, 2025; Labels: KQ Entertainment, Kakao Entertainment; Formats: CD, digital download, streaming; Track listing: 1. "Iconic"; 2. "See You Play (S'il vous plait)" 3. "Superpower (Peak)"; 4. "Blurry"; 5. "Right In"	4	31	—	—	4	KOR: 319,435; JPN: 2,205	
Route Zero: The Ora	Released: May 19, 2026; Labels: KQ Entertainment, Kakao Entertainment; Formats: CD, digital download, streaming	5	31	—	—	4	KOR: 313,623; JPN: 1,472	
Route Zero: The Calling	Released: November 2, 2026; Labels: KQ Entertainment, Kakao Entertainment; Formats: CD, digital download, streaming	4	61	—	—	6	KOR: 287,566	
"—" denotes a recording that did not chart or was not released in that region

=== Singles ===
==== Korean singles ====
List of singles, showing year released, selected chart positions and album name
Title	Year	Peak chart positions	Album
Title	Year	KOR DL	Album
"Tricky House" (도깨비집)	2023	113	House of Tricky: Doorbell Ringing
"Rockstar"	2023	158	House of Tricky: Doorbell Ringing
"Do or Die"	2023	121	House of Tricky: How to Play
"Home Boy"	2023	138	House of Tricky: How to Play
"We Don't Stop"	2024	92	House of Tricky: Trial and Error
"Witch" (위치)	2024	151	House of Tricky: Watch Out
"Breathe"	2025	22	House of Tricky: Spur
"Iconic"	2025	—	House of Tricky: Wrecking the House
"Superpower (Peak)"	2025	153	House of Tricky: Wrecking the House
"Okay"	2026	43	Route Zero: The Ora
"—" denotes a recording that did not chart or was not released in that region.

==== Japanese singles ====
List of singles, showing year released, selected chart positions, sales and album name
Title	Year	Peak chart positions		Sales	Album
Title	Year	JPN	JPN Hot	Sales	Album
"Tsuki (Lunatic)"	2024	8	48	JPN: 20,037	Non-album singles
"Up All Night"	2025	5	51	JPN: 13,383	Non-album singles

=== Other charted songs ===
List of other charted songs, showing year released, selected chart positions, and name of the album
Title	Year	Peak chart positions	Album
Title	Year	KOR Down.	Album
"The Tricky's Secret"	2023	192	House of Tricky: Doorbell Ringing
"Doorbell Ringing"	2023	185	House of Tricky: Doorbell Ringing
"Dynamic" (淸亮(청량))	2023	188	House of Tricky: Doorbell Ringing
"Xikey"	2023	184	House of Tricky: Doorbell Ringing
"Oh My Gosh"	2023	187	House of Tricky: Doorbell Ringing
"Skater"	2023	142	House of Tricky: How to Play
"Koong"	2023	148	House of Tricky: How to Play
"Run"	2023	146	House of Tricky: How to Play
"Sunny Side"	2023	145	House of Tricky: How to Play
"Trial and Error (Whereabouts)"	2024	134	House of Tricky: Trial and Error
"Red Sun"	2024	126	House of Tricky: Trial and Error
"Supercalifragilistic"	2024	131	House of Tricky: Trial and Error
"Every Flavor Jelly" (온갖 맛이 나는 젤리)	2024	133	House of Tricky: Trial and Error
"Break a Leg"	2024	130	House of Tricky: Trial and Error
"Watch Out"	2024	197	House of Tricky: Watch Out
"Back Off"	2024	191	House of Tricky: Watch Out
"Bittersweet"	2024	193	House of Tricky: Watch Out
"Sand Castle"	2024	195	House of Tricky: Watch Out
"Hang Around"	2024	194	House of Tricky: Watch Out

== Videography ==
=== Music videos ===
Title	Year	Director(s)	Notes	Ref.
"Geek"	2022	Unknown	Pre-debut music videos	
"Canvas" (Sung by Minjae, Sumin, Yechan)	2022	Unknown	Pre-debut music videos	
"Tricky House"	2023	Seong Wonmo (Digipedi)	Debut music videos	
"Rockstar"	2023	Seong Wonmo (Digipedi), Yasuhiro Arafune (EPOCH)	Debut music videos	
"Koong"	2023	Kwon Yongsoo (Studio Saccharin)	Performance Video	
"Do or Die"	2023	Yeom Woo-jin	—N/a	
"Homeboy"	2023	Jo Won-jun (Studio Wacko)	—N/a	
"Sunny Side"	2023	xikers	Special Video for road𝓨	
"Run"	2023	Lee Sagan (Zanybros)	Special Video in xikers WORLD TOUR [TRICKY HOUSE : FIRST ENCOUNTER]	
"We Don't Stop"	2024	Kwon Yongsoo (Studio Saccharin)	—N/a	
"Red Sun"	2024	Kwon Yongsoo (Studio Saccharin)	Performance Video	
"Tsuki (Lunatic)"	2024	Guzza (KUDO)	Debut 1st Japan Single	
"Witch"	2024	Kwon Yongsoo (Studio Saccharin)	—N/a	
"Bittersweet"	2024	Lee Minju, Lee Hayoung (MOSWANTD)	Performance Video	
"Sandcastle"	2024	xikers	Special Video for road𝓨	
"Breathe"	2025	Kwon Yongsoo (Studio Saccharin)	—N/a	

== Filmography ==
=== Television show ===
Year	Title	Ref.
2022	The Player: KPop Quest	
2023	Let's Go Xikers	

=== Web show ===
Year	Title	Notes	Ref.
2022	Ready to One	Pre-debut training in Los Angeles	
2023	Tricky House		

== Awards and nominations ==
Name of the award ceremony, year presented, category, nominee of the award, and the result of the nomination
Award ceremony	Year	Category	Nominee / Work	Result	Ref.
Asia Artist Awards	2025	Potential Award	Xikers	Won	
Asian Pop Music Awards (Note: Hosted by the Hong Kong Asia Pacific International Group and Sunway Records, the Asian Pop Music Awards bases its winners on the "Asian Pop Music Chart" which opened in September 2019.)	2023	Best New Artist (Overseas)	House of Tricky: How to Play	Nominated	
Golden Disc Awards	2023	Rookie of the Year	Xikers	Nominated	
Hanteo Music Awards	2023	Rookie of the Year – Male	Xikers	Nominated	
iHeartRadio Music Awards	2024	Best New K-pop Artist	Xikers	Nominated	
K-Global Heart Dream Awards	2023	K-Global Super Rookie Award	Xikers	Won	
MAMA Awards	2023	Album of the Year	House of Tricky: How to Play	Longlisted	
MAMA Awards	2023	Artist of the Year	Xikers	Longlisted	
MAMA Awards	2023	Best New Male Artist	Xikers	Nominated	
MAMA Awards	2023	Worldwide Fans' Choice Top 10	Xikers	Nominated	
Seoul Music Awards	2024	Rookie of the Year	Xikers	Nominated	
Seoul Music Awards	2025	Main Prize (Bonsang)	Xikers	Nominated	
Seoul Music Awards	2025	Popularity Award	Xikers	Nominated	
Seoul Music Awards	2025	K-Wave Special Award	Xikers	Nominated	
Seoul Music Awards	2025	K-pop World Choice – Group	Xikers	Nominated	
Universal Superstar Awards	2024	Universal Hot Focus	Xikers	Won	

== Tours ==
- Tricky House: First Encounter World Tour (2023)
- Road to XY: Enter the Gate World Tour (2025)
