= KQ Entertainment =

South Korean entertainment company

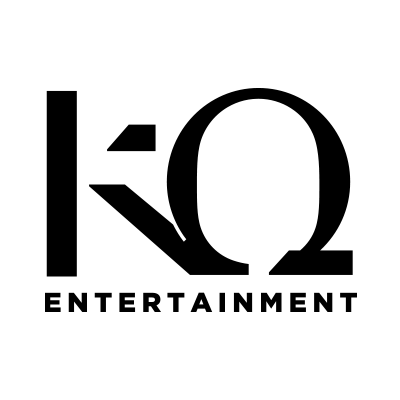
- Native name: KQ엔터테인먼트
- Formerly: Seven Seasons Entertainment
- Type: active
- Industry: Entertainment
- Genre: K-pop; Hip hop; R&B
- Founded: 2016; 10 years ago
- Founder: Kim Kyu-wook
- Headquarters: Mapo-gu, Seoul, South Korea
- Key people: Kim Kyu-wook (founder and CEO)
- Operating income: 2,843,251,322 won (2021)
- Total assets: 49,604,545,404 won (2021)
- Subsidiaries: Seven Seasons; KQ Produce
- Website: kqent.com

KQ Entertainment (Korean: KQ엔터테인먼트), formerly known as Seven Seasons, is a South Korean entertainment company founded in 2016 by Kim Kyu-wook.

KQ Entertainment, is home to the K-pop groups Ateez and Xikers, and manages two labels: Seven Seasons, Block B's label, and KQ Produce, a label for singer-songwriters and producers.

== History ==
After Block B left Stardom Entertainment in 2013, Kim Kyu-wook founded the label Seven Seasons specifically for the group, the name representing the seven members.

In June 2016 Seven Seasons changed their name to KQ Entertainment in order to branch out, develop and support a bigger variety of artists and improve their management through structural changes. Seven Seasons has operated since then as one of two subsidiaries along the label KQ Produce.

In November 2017, it was announced Sony Music Korea had struck a strategic partnership through equity investment with KQ Entertainment; it was later revealed they own 33%.

The K-pop group Ateez debuted in October 2018 under the label KQ Entertainment.

In September 2021, P.O's label, Seven Seasons, announced that he would not be renewing his contract with them at the end of the month.

The label has been focusing on international markets as a way to gain attention for their group Ateez.

In January 2023, Block B members Jaehyo, B-Bomb and U-Kwon left KQ Entertainment after the expiration of their respective contracts.

On March 30, 2023, KQ Entertainment debuted a new boy group Xikers.

KQ Entertainment has created a new app for fans to receive information and content about their boy groups Ateez and Xikers.

For one month from April 10 to June 10, 2024, KQ Entertainment held KQ ENT. (ATEEZ & xikers): A Grammy Museum Pop-Up in partnership with the Grammy Museum.

On January 20, 2025, KQ announced that they had signed an exclusive contract with Sohyang.

== Partnerships ==
- Sony Music
- CJ E&M
- My Music Taste
- RCA Records

== Artists ==
=== KQ Ent. ===
- Ateez
- Xikers
- Sohyang

=== Seven Seasons ===
- Block B
  - Bastarz
  - T2U
- Taeil
- Park Kyung

=== KQ Produce ===
- Eden
- Maddox

== Former artists ==
- Zico
- Lucy
- HBL
- Heo Young-saeng
- Babylon
- Score
- P.O
- B-Bomb
- Jaehyo
- U-Kwon
