= List of songs recorded by Itzy =

Songs recorded by Itzy

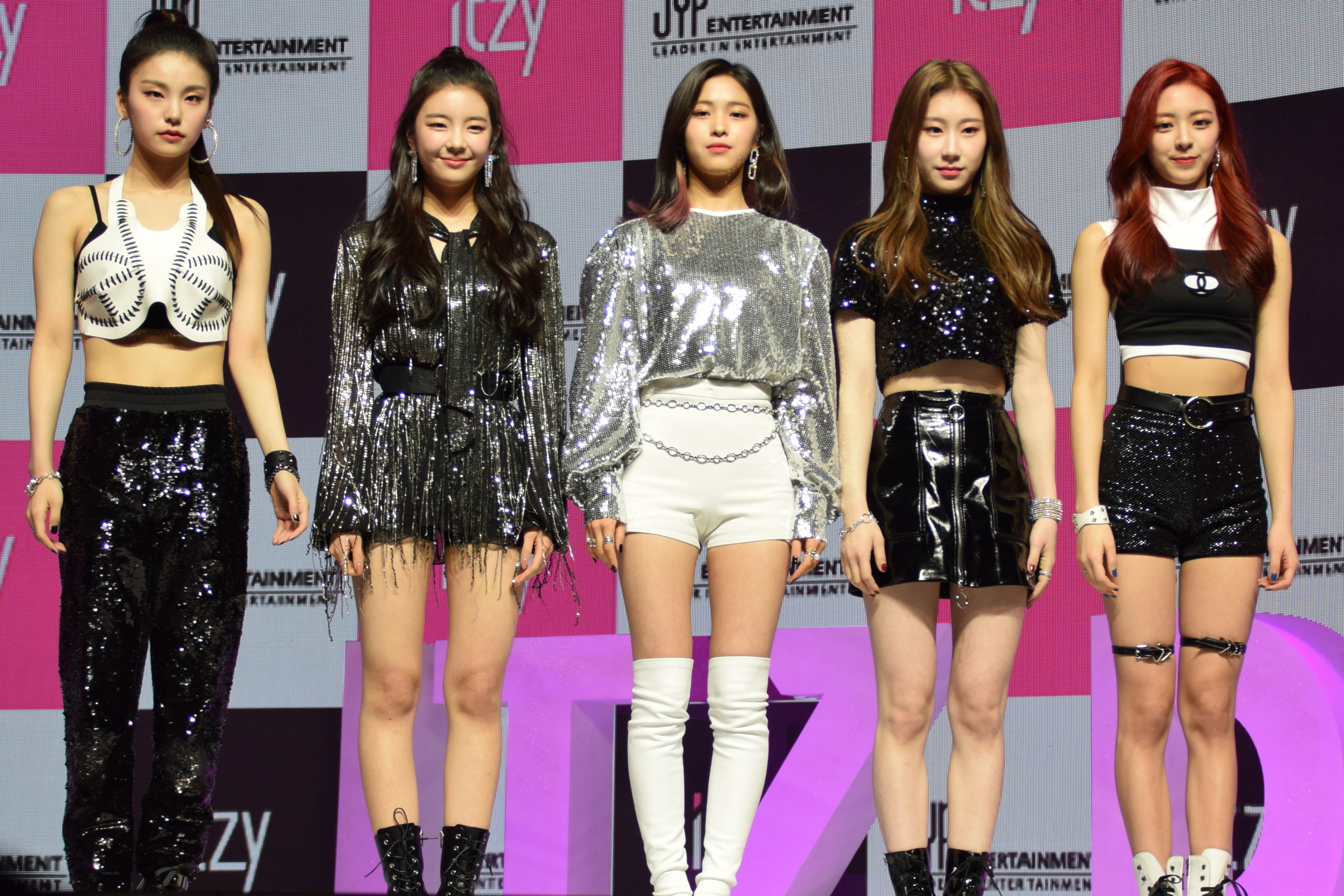
Itzy in 2019

The following is a list of songs recorded by the South Korean girl group Itzy, whose members are Yeji, Lia, Ryujin, Chaeryeong, and Yuna. The group has officially released 104 songs, 87 of which were originally recorded in Korean, 15 in Japanese, and 2 in English.

Key
†	Indicates a single release

== Songs originally recorded in Korean ==
List of songs, showing year released, writers name, and originating album
Song	Year	Lyrics	Music	Album	Ref.
"#Twenty"	2021	Baek Geum-min (JamFactory), Earattack	Earattack, Charles "Chizzy" Stephens, Chan's, Eniac, Patricia K, Kim Bo-mi, April Bender	Crazy in Love	
"24Hrs"	2020	Penomeco	Sophie, Lola Blanc	It'z Me	
"365"	2022	Kenzie	Kenzie, Deez, Yunsu, Ylva Dimberg	Checkmate	
"8-bit Heart"	2025	Zisu (Mumw)	Adrian Thesen, Ronny Svendsen, Louise Lindberg, BB Elliot, Pizzapunk	Tunnel Vision	
"B[oo]m-Boxx"	2021	Jo In-ho (Lalala studio)	Ian Asher, Anne Judith Stokke Wik, Nermin Harambašić, Ronny Svendsen	Crazy in Love	
"Bad Girls R Us"	2024	Jo Yoon-kyung	Jason Suwito, Alexandra Maria Veltri, Noémie Legrand	Gold	
"Be in Love"	2020	Kenzie	Kenzie, Caesar & Loui, Cazzi Opeia	Not Shy	
"Bet on Me"	2023	J.Y. Park, 12h51m (VeryGoods)	David (Mickey) Karbal, Philip von Boch Scully, Ben Samama, Eli Teplin, Lauren Dyson, Kendall Grayson Brower	Kill My Doubt	
"Blossom" (Note: "Blossom" is a solo song by Lia.)	2024	Lia, Sim Eun-ji	Lia, Sim Eun-ji	Born To Be	
"Born To Be"	2024	Noday	Arineh Karimi, Gusten Dahlqvist	Born To Be	
"Bratty"	2023	Ellie Suh (153/Joombas), Lilijune (153/Joombas), Ben Haim, Adrienn, Larus Anarson, Michael Ojike McHenry	Ben Haim, Larus Anarson, Michael Ojike McHenry	Kill My Doubt	
"Break Ice" (Note: "Break Ice" is a collaboration with Second Aunt KimDaVi.)	2021	peaceToT (Choigang)	peaceToT (Choigang), 강명신 (Choigang)	Non-album single	
"Cake" †	2023	Black Eyed Pilseung, Jeon Goon	Black Eyed Pilseung, Flyt	Kill My Doubt	
"Cherry"	2019	Ellie Suh (153/Joombas)	Michael Fonseca, Mac Montgomery, Jax, Dan Henig	It'z Icy	
"Cheshire" (Note: "Cheshire" (Japanese version) was released as part of Ringo on October 18, 2023.) †	2022	Hwang Su-min (153/Joombas), Jeong Ha-ri (153/Joombas)	Timothy Tan, Ciara Muscat, Josefin Glenmark, Jar (153/Joombas), Justin Reinstein, Jjean	Cheshire	
"Chillin' Chillin'"	2021	Yoon Ye-ji	Young Chance, Shorelle, David Anthony Eames	Crazy in Love	
"Crown On My Head" (Note: "Crown On My Head" is a solo song by Yeji.)	2024	Yeji, Friday (Galactika), Jvde (Galactika)	War of Stars (Galactika), Yeji, Pablo (Galactika), Woobin	Born To Be	
"Dalla Dalla" (Note: "Dalla Dalla" (English version) was released as part of Not Shy (English ver.) on January 22, 2021. The Japanese version was released as part of It'z Itzy on December 22, 2021.) †	2019	Galactika	Galactika, Antenna	It'z Different	
"Domino"	2022	Hwang Eunbi (Pnp)	Christian Fast, Gusten Dahlqvist, Jonna Hall	Checkmate	
"Don't Give a What"	2020	Lee Seuran	collapsedone, Justin Reinstein, JJean, 엘에이촌놈들	Not Shy	
"Dynamite"	2024	Noday	Kobee (Melange/InHouse), Holy M (Melange/InHouse), Voll (InHouse), Noémie Legrand, Sofia Quinn	Born To Be	
"DYT"	2025	Kenzie	Kenzie, Jsong, Rouno	Tunnel Vision	
"Escalator"	2024	Lee Tor-eu	G'harah PK' Degeddingseze, Tricia Battani	Born To Be	
"Five"	2024	Myung Hye-in (Inhouse), Song Yu (Inhouse)	Kobee (Melange/Inhouse), Holy M (Melange/Inhouse), Voll (Inhouse), Ezit (Inhouse), Arineh Karimi, Jonna Hall	Gold	
"Flicker"	2025	Yu Ji-sang	Winnie, Nueve, Barun, Yui Kylee, Mai Haylee	Tunnel Vision	
"Focus"	2025	Yeji, Lia, Ryujin, Chaeryeong, Yuna, Noday	Noday	Tunnel Vision	
"Freaky"	2022	Moon Seol-ri	Jacob "Ontrackz" Andersson, Molly Rosenstrom	Cheshire	
"Free Fall"	2022	Song Heejin, Kevin Oppa	Song Hee-jin (Solcire), Kevin Oppa (Solcire), Christoffer Semelius	Checkmate	
"Gas Me Up"	2021	Vacation	250, Ylva Dimberg	Crazy in Love	
"Girls Will Be Girls" (Note: "Girls Will Be Girls" (English version) was released as part of the digital remix single Girls Will Be Girls (Remixes) on June 13, 2025. The Japanese version was released as part of Collector on October 8, 2025.) †	2025	Jo In-ho (Lalala Studio)	Ryan Jhun, Jack Brady, Jordan Roman, David Charles Fischer, Kristin Carpenter, The Wavys	Girls Will Be Girls	
"Glitch"	2026	Im Hyun-a (Jamfactory)	Ludwig "Loui" Lindell, Jasmine (UP), Hwaji (UP)	Motto	
"Gold" (Note: "Gold" (English version) was released as a digital single on October 25, 2024. The Japanese version was released as part of Collector on October 8, 2024.) †	2024	Ryan Jhun, Seon, Young, Eeeee	Ryan Jhun, Dem Jointz, Jen DeCilveo, 8AE, Bailey Flores, Stan Greene	Gold	
"I Don't Wanna Dance"	2020	JQ (제이큐), makeumine works (정세희)	Anne Judith Stokke Wik, Nermin Harambašić, Jin By Jin, Seung Eun Oh, Andreas Baertels	It'z Me	
"Icy" (Note: "Icy" (English version) was released as part of Not Shy (English ver.) on January 22, 2021. The Japanese version was released as part of It'z Itzy on December 22, 2021.) †	2019	J.Y. Park, Penomeco	J.Y. Park, Cazzi Opeia, Ellen Berg Tollbom, Daniel Caesar, Ludwig Lindell, Ashley Alisha, Cameron Neilson, Lauren Dyson	It'z Icy	
"iD"	2020	MosPick, Young Chance	MosPick, Young Chance	Not Shy	
"Imaginary Friend" (Note: "Imaginary Friend" (English version) was released as a digital single on October 25, 2024. The Japanese version was released as part of Collector on October 8, 2024.) †	2024	Ryan Jhun	Ryan Jhun, James Daniel Lewis, Sorana Pacurar, Jun Seo, Hwan Yang	Gold	
"In the Morning" (Note: "In the Morning" (English version) was released as a digital single on May 14, 2021. The Japanese version was released as part of It'z Itzy on December 22, 2021.) †	2021	J.Y. Park, Kass, Danke, Lyre	Lyre, J.Y. Park, earattack, Kass, Lee Hae-sol	Guess Who	
"It'z Summer"	2019	JQ, Shin Sae-rom, Kako	Poptime, Kako	It'z Icy	
"Kidding Me"	2021	Kobee, Holy M, KASS	Kobee, Holy M	Guess Who	
"Kill Shot"	2023	Kang Eun-jeong	Sofia Quinn, David James Burris, Noémie Legrand	Kill My Doubt	
"Kiss & Tell"	2025	Seyoung (153/Joombas)	Maya Rose, Karin Wilhelmina Eurenius, Tobias Näslund	Girls Will Be Girls	
"Like Magic" (Note: "Like Magic" is a collaboration with J.Y. Park, Stray Kids, and Nmixx.)	2024	J.Y. Park, Deza, Hadar Adora, Changbin	J.Y. Park, Deza, Hadar Adora, Lee Hae-sol	Non-album single	
"Locked N Loaded"	2025	Noday	Alex Karlsson, T-Ma, Arineh Karimi, Jono	Girls Will Be Girls	
"Loco" (Note: "Loco" (English version) was released as part of Crazy in Love on September 24, 2021. The Japanese version was released as a digital single on December 1, 2021.) †	2021	Star Wars (Galactika)	Star Wars (Galactika), Atenna (Galactika), Woo Bin (Galactika)	Crazy in Love	
"Look" (Note: "Look" is a solo song by Ryujin.)	2026	Kass	Kass	Motto	
"Louder"	2020	Dr.JO	Kairos	Not Shy	
"Love Is"	2021	Choi Ji-yoon (153/Joombas)	Harold Philippon, Kim Yeon-seo, Anne Judith Stokke Wik, Ronny Svendsen	Crazy in Love	
"Mine" (Note: "Mine" is a solo song by Chaeryeong.)	2024	Chaeryeong, Selah	Chaeryeong, Lee Woo-bin "collapsedone", Justin Reinstein, Anna Timgren	Born To Be	
"Mirror"	2021	Jo Yoon-kyung	Sebastian Thott, Rosanna Enér	Crazy in Love	
"Motto" †	2026	Gu Seong-min (Artiffect), Bang Hye-hyun, Noday	Rouno, Justin Reinstein, Morgan Kubes	Motto	
"Mr. Vampire"	2024	Seo Ji-yun	Kobee (Melange/InHouse), Holy M (Melange/InHouse), Ezit (InHouse), Noémie Legrand, Sofia Quinn	Born To Be	
"Nobody Like You"	2020	Yubin, Josh Record, Andrew Bullimore	collapsedone, Josh Record, Andrew Bullimore	It'z Me	
"Nocturne"	2025	Choi Sang-rok (Lalala Studio)	Aeko, Enzoh, C'SA	Tunnel Vision	
"None of My Business"	2023	Lee Seu-ran, Rachel West, Barry Cohen	Rachel West, Barry Cohen	Kill My Doubt	
"Not Shy" (Note: "Not Shy" (English version) was released as part of Not Shy (English ver.) on January 22, 2021. The Japanese version was released as part of It'z Itzy on December 22, 2021.) †	2020	J.Y. Park	Kobee, Charlotte Wilson	Not Shy	
"Pocket" (Note: "Pocket" is a solo song by Yeji.)	2026	Lov3notdxxd	Lov3notdxxd, Frankie Day (The Hub), Ayushy (The Hub)	Motto	
"Promise"	2025	Lee Hyung-seok (PNP)	no2zcat, Une, Youha, Dunk	Girls Will Be Girls	
"Psychic Lover"	2023	Danke	Christian Fast, Gusten Dahlqvist, Sofia Quinn, Noémie Legrand	Kill My Doubt	
"Racer" (Note: Stylized as "RAC3R".)	2022	Noday, Iris Yerin Lee, Czaer	Noday, Iris Yerin Lee, Czaer	Checkmate	
"Run Away" (Note: "Run Away" is a solo song by Ryujin.)	2024	Ryujin, Friday (Galactika), Jvde (Galactika)	War of Stars (Galactika), Pablo (Galactika), Ryujin, Woobin	Born To Be	
"Shoot!"	2021	Lee Ha-jin, Mad Clown, Kim Seung-min	Alexander Pavelich, Maria Hazell, Jerker Olov Hansson, Gigi Grombacher, Joakim Harestad Haukaas, Evard Forre Erfjord	Guess Who	
"Sneakers" (Note: "Sneakers" (English version) was released as part of Checkmate on July 15, 2022. The Japanese version was released as part of Ringo on October 18, 2023.) †	2022	friday (Galactika), Ogi (Galactika), Didrok Thott, Jessica Pierpoint	Didrik Thott, Sebastian Thott, Pierpoint	Checkmate	
"Snowy"	2022	Jang Jeong-won (Jam Factory)	Stian Nyhammer Olsen, Julia Bognar Finnseter, Paulos Solbø, Joshua Leung	Cheshire	
"Sooo Lucky"	2021	Shim Eun-ji	Shim Eun-ji, Lee Min-young (EastWest), Yeul (1by1)	Crazy in Love	
"Sorry Not Sorry"	2021	JQ, J14, Tomboy (makeumine works)	Shim Eun-ji, Lee Min-young (EastWest), Yeul (1by1)	Guess Who	
"Supernatural"	2024	Bang Hye-hyun, Moon Seol-ri	Jack Brady, Jordan Roman, Austin Wolfe, Sofia Quinn, The Wavys	Gold	
"Superpowers"	2023	WarmIt (MonoTree)	Anymasinggga, Fuxxy (MonoTree), Alina Smith, Annalise Morelli, Gino Barletta	Strong Girl Nam-soon OST	
"Surf"	2020	Danke (Lalala Studio)	Greg Bonnick, Hayden Chapman, Cazzi Opeia, Ellen Berg	Not Shy	
"Swipe"	2021	Jo Yoon-kyung	Ludvig Lindell, Josefin Glenmark, Oneye	Crazy in Love	
"Tangerine" (Note: "Tangerine" is a solo song by Yuna.)	2026	Sim Eun-ji	Sim Eun-ji	Motto	
"Tennis (0:0)"	2021	JQ, Vacation (makeumine works)	Coach & Sendo, Cazzi Opeia, Alex Chang Jien	Guess Who	
"That's a No No"	2020	Shim Eunji, Kass	Shim Eunji, Kass, Ariowa Irosogie	It'z Me	
"Ting Ting Ting"	2020	Penomeco, Lee Seu-ran, Kang Eun-jeong	Warren "Oak" Felder, Janee “Jin Jin” Bennett, Oliver Heldens	It'z Me	
"Trust Me (Midzy)" (Note: "Trust Me (Midzy)" (English version) was released as a digital single on March 20, 2021. The Japanese version was released digitally on August 30, 2023, and later included on Ringo, which was released on October 18, 2023.) †	2021	MosPick, Young Chance	MosPick, Young Chance	Non-album single	
"Tunnel Vision" (Note: "Tunnel Vision" (English version) was released as part of the digital remix single Tunnel Vision (Remixes) on November 14, 2025.) †	2025	Noday, Lee Soon-gan (Lalala Studio), Lee To-reu (Lalala Studio)	Dem Jointz, Ryan Jhun, Amanda "Kiddo" Ibanez, 8AE, Ido Nadjar	Tunnel Vision	
"Undefined" (Note: "Undefined" is a solo song by Chaeryeong.)	2026	Minkyu, Seora	Lee Hae-sol, Maria Marcus	Motto	
"Untouchable" †	2024	Bang Hye-hyeon, Lee Seu-ran	Maria Marcus, Zarah Christenson, Tobias Näslund	Born To Be	
"Vay" (Note: "Vay" features Changbin of Stray Kids.)	2024	Changbin (3Racha)	Changbin (3Racha), Restart, Chae Kang-hae	Gold	
"Walk"	2025	Bang Hye-hyun	Winnie, Heggy	Girls Will Be Girls	
"Wannabe" (Note: "Wannabe" (English version) was released as part of Not Shy (English ver.) on January 22, 2021. The Japanese version was released as a digital single on November 1, 2021.) †	2020	Galactika	Galactika	It'z Me	
"Want It?"	2019	Lee Seu-ran, Tommy Park	Emile Ghantous, Keith Hetrick, Allison Gillis, Aimee Proal, Whitney Phillips, Erin Beck	It'z Different	
"Weapon"	2022	Noday, Iris Yerin Lee, Moode, Czaer	Czaer, Noday, Michelle Buzz	Street Dance Girls Fighter Special	
"What I Want"	2022	Saebom (Lalala Studio)	Greg Bonnick, Hayden Chapman, Karin Wilhemina Eurenius	Checkmate	
"Wild Wild West"	2021	earattack	Andy Love (153/Joombas), earattack	Guess Who	
"Yet, But" (Note: "Yet, but" is a solo song by Yuna.)	2024	Yuna, Saint	Yuna, Lee Woo-bin "collapsedone", Machi (Mrch)	Born To Be	
"You and I"	2026	Yu Ji-sang	Kim Ju-hyeong, Arineh Karimi, BB Elliot	Motto	
"You Make Me"	2020	Lee Seu-ran, earattack, Miranda Glory Inzunza	earattack, Miranda Glory Inzunza, Matthew Ferree	It'z Me	

== Songs originally recorded in Japanese ==
List of songs, showing year released, writers name, and originating album
Song	Year	Lyrics	Music	Album	Ref.
"Algorhythm" †	2024	Mayu Wakisaka	Josef Melin, Cecilia Kallin	Algorhythm	
"Blah Blah Blah" †	2022	Mio Jorakuji	Sim Eunjee, Minyoung Lee (EastWest), Yeul (1by1)	Ringo	
"Can't Tie Me Down"	2022	Yo-Hei	Selah, Awry (The Hub), Ayushy, The Hub 88 (The Hub)	Blah Blah Blah	
"I. I. Know Me"	2025	Masami Kakinuma	Alawn, Andy Love, Carmen Reece	Collector	
"No Biggie"	2024	Yui Kimura, Anton Curly Nessvi, Oneye, Lara Andersson	Anton Curly Nessvi, Oneye, Lara Andersson	Algorhythm	
"Out of season"	2025	Hiyori Nara	ESUM, Stella Jones (153/Joombas)	Collector	
"Playlist"	2023	Mio JoroKuhji	Avenue 52, Gabe Lopez, JJean, Justin Reinstein	Ringo	
"Ringo" †	2023	Seo Young-won, Yu- ki Kokubo	JJean, Scott Russell Stoddart	Ringo	
"Rock & Roll" †	2025	Park Sang-yu (153Joombas), Elvyn (No Theory)	dainasaurs, Avenue 52, Scott Russell Stoddart	Collector	
"Spice"	2022	D&H (JPN)	Kobee, Holy M	Ringo	
"Style"	2023	Kentz	Nermin Harambašić, Benjamin Sahba, Sverre Sunde, Adrian Thesen, Anne Judith Wik	Ringo	
"Suger-holic"	2023	Kaz Kuwanmura, Yhel	Kass, Ciara Muscat, Tim Tan	Ringo	
"Trigger"	2025	Mayu Wakisaka	no2zcat, Youha, Dunk, Sutt	Collector	
"Voltage" †	2022	Mayu Wakisaka	Selah, Charlotte Wilson, Frankie Day, Ayushy, The Hub 88	Ringo	
"Wind Ride"	2025	Hiyori Nara	Sqvare, Jjean, Avenue 52, Rouno	Collector	

== Songs originally recorded in English ==
List of songs, showing year released, writers name, and originating album
Song	Year	Lyrics	Music	Album	Ref.
"Asylum" (Note: "Asylum" is a solo song by Lia.)	2026	Julia Ross, Ash Minor	Lee Woo-min "Collapsedone", Mrch	Motto	
"Boys Like You" †	2022	Didrik Thott, Hayley Aitken, Sara Davis, Ellie Suh (153/Joombas), 이주희 (makeumine works)	Didrik Thott, Sebastian Thott, Hayley Aitken	Cheshire	

== See also ==
- Itzy discography
