= Itzy discography =

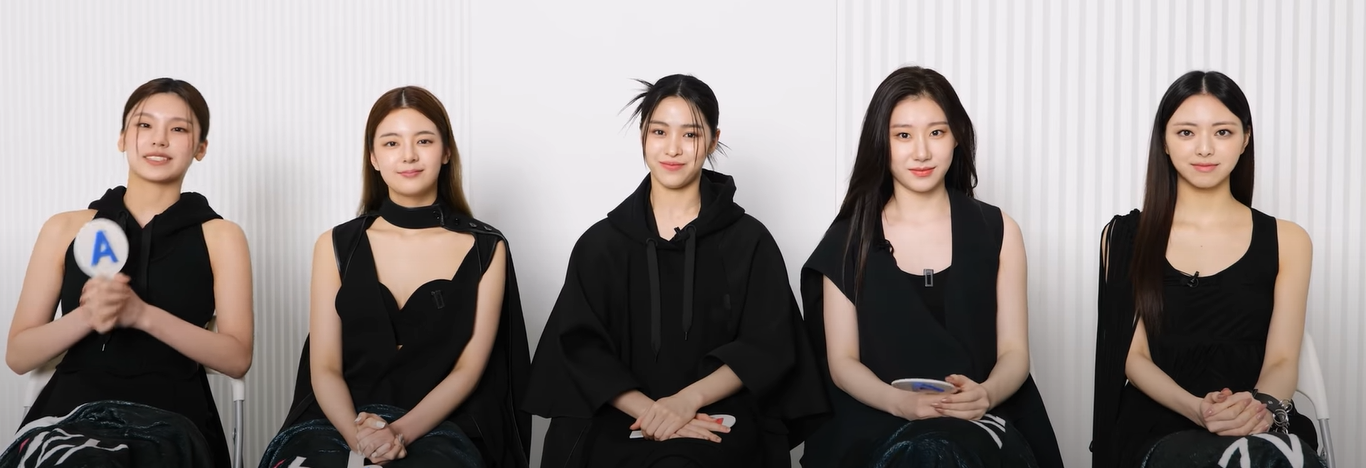
- Itzy in October 2022
- Studio albums: 3
- EPs: 12
- Compilation albums: 1
- Singles: 21
- Music videos: 32
- Single albums: 1
- Promotional singles: 9
- Soundtrack appearances: 1
- Video albums: 3

South Korean girl group Itzy have released three studio albums, one compilation album, twelve extended plays, one single album, twenty-one singles, nine promotional singles, and one soundtrack.

On February 12, 2019, the group released their debut single album It'z Different, led by the single "Dalla Dalla", which peaked at number two on the Circle Digital Chart and was the best-performing girl group song of 2019 in South Korea. They scored one of the biggest Billboard debuts for a new K-pop act in years, with "Dalla Dalla" peaking at number two on the World Digital Song Sales chart. It became the first debut song by a K-pop group to earn a platinum certification from the Korea Music Content Association (KMCA). Itzy's first extended play It'z Icy was released on July 29 and peaked at number three on the Circle Album Chart, while its single "Icy" reached the top ten on the Circle Digital Chart.

Itzy released their second EP It'z Me on March 9, 2020, which became their first number-one album. The lead single "Wannabe" was their third to enter the top ten of the Circle Digital Chart and was certified gold in Japan and the United States. On August 17, the group released their third EP and second number-one album Not Shy; its lead single of the same name reached the top ten in South Korea and was certified gold in Japan. On April 30, 2021, Itzy released their fourth EP Guess Who and its single "In the Morning", both of which entered the top ten of their respective charts. The EP was certified platinum for surpassing 250,000 units sold in South Korea and was their first entry on the US Billboard 200. The group's first studio album Crazy in Love was released on September 24 and became their third number-one album. It debuted at number 11 on the US Billboard 200 and was certified 2× platinum for achieving 500,000 units sold in South Korea.

Itzy's fifth EP Checkmate was released on July 15, 2022 and featured the top-five single "Sneakers". It was their fourth number-one album and their first to be certified million for surpassing 1,000,000 copies sold. It also debuted at number eight on the Billboard 200 to become Itzy's first top-ten album in the United States. The group's sixth and seventh EPs Cheshire and Kill My Doubt were released on November 30, 2022 and July 31, 2023; both reached number one on the Circle Album Chart and the top 25 on the Billboard 200, and sold over a million copies. Itzy released their first Japanese studio album Ringo on October 18, which reached the top ten of the Oricon Albums Chart. It was preceded by the singles "Voltage" and "Blah Blah Blah", which both peaked at number three on the Oricon Singles Chart.

== Albums ==
=== Korean studio albums ===
List of Korean studio albums, showing selected details, chart positions, sales figures, and certifications
Title	Details	Peak chart positions										Sales	Certifications (Note: In April 2018, Gaon Music Chart introduced music recording certifications for albums, downloads, and streamings that were released and licensed in Korea starting from January 2018 onward.)
Title	Details	KOR	BEL (FL)	BEL (WA)	FIN	HUN	JPN	JPN Hot	UK DL	US	US World	Sales	Certifications
Crazy in Love	Released: September 24, 2021; Label: JYP Entertainment; Formats: CD, digital download, streaming	1	26	41	21	13	8	34	39	11	1	KOR: 642,393; US: 22,000	KMCA: 2× Platinum

=== Japanese studio albums ===
List of Japanese studio albums, showing selected details, chart positions, and sales figures
Title	Details	Peak chart positions		Sales
Title	Details	JPN	JPN Hot	Sales
Ringo	Released: October 18, 2023; Label: Warner Music Japan; Formats: CD, digital download, streaming	7	5	JPN: 28,864
Collector	Released: October 8, 2025; Label: Warner Music Japan; Formats: CD, digital download, streaming	3	17	JPN: 35,622

=== Compilation albums ===
List of compilation albums, showing selected details, chart positions, and sales figures
Title	Details	Peak chart positions	Sales
Title	Details	JPN	Sales
It'z Itzy	Released: December 22, 2021; Label: Warner Music Japan; Formats: CD, digital download, streaming; Track listing: 1. "Dalla Dalla" (Japanese version); 2. "Icy" (Japanese version); 3. "Wannabe" (Japanese version); 4. "Not Shy" (Japanese version); 5. "In the Morning" (Japanese version); 6. "Loco" (Japanese version); 7. "Dalla Dalla"; 8. "Icy"; 9. "Wannabe"; 10. "Not Shy"; 11. "In the Morning"; 12. "Loco"	4	JPN: 30,740

== Extended plays ==
List of extended plays, showing selected details, chart positions, sales figures, and certifications
Title	Details	Peak chart positions										Sales	Certifications
Title	Details	KOR	BEL (FL)	BEL (WA)	JPN	JPN Hot	POL	UK DL	US	US Heat.	US World	Sales	Certifications
It'z Icy	Released: July 29, 2019; Label: JYP Entertainment; Formats: CD, digital download, streaming	3	—	—	12	32	—	—	—	19	11	KOR: 201,403; JPN: 15,742; US: 1,000	
It'z Me	Released: March 9, 2020; Label: JYP Entertainment; Formats: CD, digital download, streaming	1	—	—	13	37	27	98	—	—	5	KOR: 199,504; JPN: 10,882; US: 1,000	
Not Shy	Released: August 17, 2020; Label: JYP Entertainment; Formats: CD, digital download, streaming	1	129	—	8	18	23	55	—	—	8	KOR: 269,222; JPN: 14,201	KMCA: Platinum
Guess Who	Released: April 30, 2021; Label: JYP Entertainment; Formats: CD, digital download, streaming	2	59	115	6	18	—	34	148	1	2	KOR: 365,353; JPN: 1,907; US: 3,300	KMCA: Platinum
Checkmate	Released: July 15, 2022; Label: JYP Entertainment, Republic; Formats: CD, digital download, streaming	1	62	194	10	47	9	79	8	—	1	KOR: 1,033,916; JPN: 7,237; US: 31,000	KMCA: Million
Cheshire	Released: November 30, 2022; Label: JYP Entertainment, Republic; Formats: CD, digital download, streaming	1	67	—	10	39	—	—	25	—	2	KOR: 1,057,472; JPN: 5,301	KMCA: Million
Kill My Doubt	Released: July 31, 2023; Label: JYP Entertainment, Republic; Formats: Cassette, CD, digital download, streaming	1	110	100	22	29	—	58	23	—	2	KOR: 1,207,934; JPN: 8,434; US: 23,000	KMCA: Million
Born to Be	Released: January 8, 2024; Label: JYP Entertainment, Republic; Formats: CD, digital download, streaming	1	73	108	22	30	—	14	62	—	2	KOR: 583,560; JPN: 5,858; US: 14,000	KMCA: 2× Platinum
Gold	Released: October 15, 2024; Label: JYP Entertainment, Republic; Formats: CD, digital download, streaming	3	45	116	12	38	—	—	60	—	3	KOR: 707,614; JPN: 6,222; US: 14,000	KMCA: 2× Platinum
Girls Will Be Girls	Released: June 9, 2025; Label: JYP Entertainment, Republic; Formats: Cassette, CD, digital download, streaming	2	162	—	20	—	—	80	— (Note: Girls Will Be Girls did not enter the Billboard 200, but it peaked at number 10 on the Top Album Sales.)	—	4	KOR: 502,918; JPN: 4,878; US: 7,000	KMCA: Platinum
Tunnel Vision	Released: November 10, 2025; Label: JYP Entertainment, Republic; Formats: Cassette, CD, digital download, streaming	3	—	—	22	—	—	—	— (Note: Tunnel Vision did not enter the Billboard 200, but it peaked at number 14 on the Top Album Sales.)	—	4	KOR: 415,491; JPN: 3,910	KMCA: Platinum
Motto	Released: May 18, 2026; Label: JYP Entertainment, Republic; Formats: Cassette, CD, digital download, streaming	4	—	—	31	97	—	—	—	—	7	KOR: 369,153; JPN: 868	KMCA: Platinum
"—" denotes a recording that did not chart or was not released in that territory.

=== Compilation extended plays ===
List of compilation extended plays, showing selected details, chart positions, and sales figures
Title	Details	Peak chart positions	Sales
Title	Details	JPN Dig.	Sales
Not Shy (English Version)	Released: January 22, 2021 (ENG); Label: JYP Entertainment USA; Formats: Digital download, streaming	—	
What'z Itzy	Released: September 1, 2021 (JPN); Label: Warner Music Japan; Formats: Digital download, streaming; Track listing: 1. "Dalla Dalla"; 2. "Icy"; 3. "Wannabe"; 4. "Not Shy"; 5. "In the Morning"	10	JPN: 760
"—" denotes a recording that did not chart or was not released in that territory.

== Single albums ==
List of single albums, with selected details, and chart positions
Title	Details	Peak chart positions
Title	Details	JPN Cmb.
It'z Different	Released: February 12, 2019; Label: JYP Entertainment; Formats: Digital download, streaming	48

== Singles ==
=== Korean singles ===
List of Korean singles, showing year released, chart positions, sales figures, certifications, and name of the album
Title	Year	Peak chart positions											Sales	Certifications	Album
Title	Year	KOR	KOR Billb. (Note: Includes the Billboard K-pop Hot 100 (defunct as of 2022), and South Korea Songs (part of Billboard's Hits of the World (defunct as of 2025)), and Billboard Korea Hot 100 (2025 onwards).)	CAN	JPN Cmb.	JPN Hot	MLY	NZ Hot	SGP	US World	WW	CHN KOR	Sales	Certifications	Album
"Dalla Dalla" (달라달라)	2019	2	2	—	—	31	8	20	3	2	—	—N/a (Note: Prior to the launch of the TME Korean Chart in Jan. 2024, chart data was only available via individual streaming services.)	US: 2,000	KMCA: Platinum; RIAJ: Gold	It'z Different
"Icy"	2019	10	1	—	—	34	—	—	11	7	—	—N/a		RIAJ: Gold	It'z Icy
"Wannabe"	2020	6	2	92	38	23	1	22	1	4	—	—N/a	US: 1,000	RIAA: Gold; RIAJ: Platinum	It'z Me
"Not Shy" (Note: The English version of "Not Shy" was released on January 22, 2021, including the English versions of "Dalla Dalla", "Icy", "Wannabe" as B-sides.)	2020	9	4	—	23	18	—	16	2	8	124	—N/a		RIAJ: Gold	Not Shy
"In the Morning" (마.피.아) (Note: The English version of "In the Morning" was released on May 14, 2021.)	2021	10	7	97	39	36	8	12	2	3	34	—N/a			Guess Who
"Loco"	2021	26	23	—	—	46	11	13	5	4	44	—N/a			Crazy in Love
"Sneakers"	2022	5	1	—	—	62	—	36	10	—	71	—N/a			Checkmate
"Cheshire"	2022	89	23	—	—	—	—	—	24	—	—	—N/a			Cheshire
"Cake"	2023	22	—	—	—	—	—	—	— (Note: "Cake" did not enter the RIAS Top International Streaming Chart, but it peaked at number 19 on the Top Regional Streaming Chart.)	—	— (Note: "Cake" did not enter the Billboard Global 200, but peaked at number 194 at the Global Excl. US.)	—N/a			Kill My Doubt
"Untouchable"	2024	93	—	—	—	—	—	—	— (Note: "Untouchable" did not enter the RIAS Top International Streaming Chart, but it peaked at number 22 on the Top Regional Streaming Chart.)	8	—	14			Born to Be
"Gold"	2024	122	—	—	—	—	—	—	—	—	—	9			Gold
"Imaginary Friend"	2024	— (Note: "Imaginary Friend" did not enter the Circle Digital Chart, but it peaked at number 25 on the component Circle Download Chart.)	—	—	—	—	—	—	—	—	—	5			Gold
"Girls Will Be Girls"	2025	102	—	—	—	—	—	—	— (Note: "Girls Will Be Girls" did not enter the Official Singapore Chart, but it peaked at number 24 on the Regional Chart.)	—	—	3			Girls Will Be Girls
"Tunnel Vision"	2025	104	—	—	—	—	—	—	—	—	—	5			Tunnel Vision
"Motto"	2026	90	—	—	—	—	—	35	—	—	—	1			Motto
"—" denotes a recording that did not chart or was not released in that territory.

=== Japanese singles ===
List of Japanese singles, showing year released, chart positions, sales figures, and name of the album
Title	Year	Peak chart positions			Sales	Album
Title	Year	JPN	JPN Hot	CHN KOR	Sales	Album
"Voltage"	2022	3	16	—N/a (Note: Prior to the launch of the TME Korean Chart in Jan. 2024, chart data was only available via individual streaming services.)	JPN: 37,943	Ringo
"Blah Blah Blah"	2022	3	11	—N/a	JPN: 33,272	Ringo
"Ringo"	2023	—	—	—N/a		Ringo
"Algorhythm"	2024	3	18	43	JPN: 39,475	Non-album single
"Rock & Roll"	2025	—	—	61		Collector
"—" denotes a recording that did not chart or was not released in that territory.

=== English singles ===
List of English singles, showing year released, chart positions, and name of the album
Title	Year	Peak chart positions	Album
Title	Year	KOR DL	Album
"Boys Like You"	2022	42	Cheshire

== Promotional singles ==
List of promotional singles, showing year released, chart positions, and name of the album
Title	Year	Peak chart positions		Album
Title	Year	KOR DL	US World	Album
"Trust Me (Midzy)" (믿지) (Original and English version)	2021	39	11	Non-album promotional singles
"Break Ice" (얼음깨) (with Second Aunt KimDaVi)	2021	47	—	Non-album promotional singles
"Wannabe" (Japanese version)	2021	—	—	It'z Itzy
"Loco" (Japanese version)	2021	—	—	It'z Itzy
"Weapon"	2022	43	—	Street Dance Girls Fighter (SGF) Special
"Trust Me (Midzy)" (Japanese version)	2023	—	—	Ringo
"Sugar-holic"	2023	—	—	Ringo
"Like Magic" (with J.Y. Park, Stray Kids and Nmixx)	2024	63	—	Non-album promotional single
"No Biggie"	2024	—	—	Algorhythm
"—" denotes a recording that did not chart or was not released in that territory

== Soundtrack appearances ==
List of soundtrack appearances, showing year released, chart positions, and name of the album
Title	Year	Peak chart positions	Album
Title	Year	KOR DL	Album
"Superpowers"	2023	37	Strong Girl Nam-soon OST

== Other charted songs ==
List of other charted songs, showing year released, chart positions, sales figures, and name of the album
Title	Year	Peak chart positions				Sales	Album
Title	Year	KOR	KOR DL	KOR Hot	US World	Sales	Album
"Want It?"	2019	—	127	—	8	US: 1,000	It'z Different
"Cherry"	2019	—	200	—	23	N/A	It'z Icy
"It'z Summer"	2019	—	181	—	—	N/A	It'z Icy
"That's a No No"	2020	108	26	84	—	N/A	It'z Me
"Don't Give a What"	2020	—	143	—	—	N/A	Not Shy
"Surf"	2020	—	162	—	—	N/A	Not Shy
"Be in Love"	2020	—	150	—	—	N/A	Not Shy
"Sorry Not Sorry"	2021	—	47	—	—	N/A	Guess Who
"Kidding Me"	2021	—	59	—	—	N/A	Guess Who
"Wild Wild West"	2021	—	73	—	—	N/A	Guess Who
"Shoot! "	2021	—	71	—	—	N/A	Guess Who
"Tennis (0:0)"	2021	—	80	—	—	N/A	Guess Who
"Swipe"	2021	—	96	—	23	N/A	Crazy in Love
"Sooo Lucky"	2021	—	47	—	—	N/A	Crazy in Love
"#Twenty"	2021	—	121	—	—	N/A	Crazy in Love
"B[oo]m-Boxx"	2021	—	127	—	—	N/A	Crazy in Love
"Gas Me Up"	2021	—	130	—	—	N/A	Crazy in Love
"Love Is"	2021	—	102	—	—	N/A	Crazy in Love
"Chillin' Chillin'"	2021	—	109	—	—	N/A	Crazy in Love
"Mirror"	2021	—	128	—	—	N/A	Crazy in Love
"Racer"	2022	—	74	—	—	N/A	Checkmate
"What I Want"	2022	—	75	—	—	N/A	Checkmate
"Free Fall"	2022	—	81	—	—	N/A	Checkmate
"365"	2022	—	86	—	—	N/A	Checkmate
"Domino"	2022	—	77	—	—	N/A	Checkmate
"Snowy"	2022	—	51	—	—	N/A	Cheshire
"Freaky"	2022	—	61	—	—	N/A	Cheshire
"Bet on Me"	2023	—	49	—	—	N/A	Kill My Doubt
"None of My Business"	2023	—	51	—	—	N/A	Kill My Doubt
"Bratty" (나쁜애)	2023	—	61	—	—	N/A	Kill My Doubt
"Psychic Lover"	2023	—	56	—	—	N/A	Kill My Doubt
"Kill Shot"	2023	—	57	—	—	N/A	Kill My Doubt
"Born to Be"	2024	—	22	—	—	N/A	Born to Be
"Mr. Vampire"	2024	—	33	—	—	N/A	Born to Be
"Dynamite"	2024	—	38	—	—	N/A	Born to Be
"Escalator"	2024	—	52	—	—	N/A	Born to Be
"Bad Girls R Us"	2024	—	58	—	—	N/A	Gold
"Supernatural"	2024	—	60	—	—	N/A	Gold
"Five"	2024	—	62	—	—	N/A	Gold
"Vay" (featuring Changbin of Stray Kids)	2024	—	67	—	—	N/A	Gold
"Kiss & Tell"	2025	—	26	—	—	N/A	Girls Will Be Girls
"Locked N Loaded"	2025	—	38	—	—	N/A	Girls Will Be Girls
"Promise"	2025	—	35	—	—	N/A	Girls Will Be Girls
"Walk"	2025	—	39	—	—	N/A	Girls Will Be Girls
"Focus"	2025	—	46	—	—	N/A	Tunnel Vision
"DYT"	2025	—	40	—	—	N/A	Tunnel Vision
"Flicker"	2025	—	38	—	—	N/A	Tunnel Vision
"Nocturne"	2025	—	42	—	—	N/A	Tunnel Vision
"8-Bit Heart"	2025	—	45	—	—	N/A	Tunnel Vision
"—" denotes a recording that did not chart or was not released in that territory.

== Music videos ==
List of music videos, showing year released, and name of the directors
Title	Year	Director(s)	Ref.
"Dalla Dalla" (달라달라)	2019	Naive Creative Production	
"Icy"	2019	Naive Creative Production	
"Wannabe"	2020	Naive Creative Production	
"Not Shy"	2020	Naive Creative Production	
"Not Shy" (English version) (In Zepeto)	2021	Unknown	
"In the Morning" (마.피.아)	2021	Bang Jae-yeob	
"Break Ice" (얼음깨) (with Second Aunt KimDaVi)	2021	Donghyeok Seo (Flipevil)	
"Loco"	2021	Rima Yoon, Jang Dong-ju (Rigend Film)	
"Swipe"	2021	Ha Jeong-hoon (Sushivisual)	
"Wannabe" (Japanese version)	2021	Naive Creative Production	
"Loco" (Japanese version)	2021	Rigend Film	
"Voltage"	2022	Naive Creative Production	
"#Twenty"	2022	Kinotaku	
"Sneakers"	2022	725 (SL8 Visual Lab)	
"Blah Blah Blah"	2022	Naive Creative Production	
"Boys Like You"	2022	Ha Jeong-hoon (Hat Trick)	
"Cheshire"	2022	725 (SL8 Visual Lab)	
"Bet on Me"	2023	Naive Creative Production	
"None of My Business"	2023	Ko Yoo-jeong (Edie Ko)	
"Cake"	2023	Rima Yoon, Jang Dong-ju (Rigend Film)	
"Ringo"	2023	Lee In-hoon (Segaji)	
"Superpowers"	2023	Kim Jeong-sik and Lee Kyung-sik	
"Sugar-holic"	2023	Takuro Okubo	
"Born to Be"	2023	Bang Jae Yeob	
"Mr. Vampire"	2024	Jo Beom-jin (VM Project Architecture)	
"Untouchable"	2024	Naive Creative Production	
"Like Magic" (with J.Y. Park, Stray Kids and Nmixx)	2024	Jan'Qui	
"Algorhythm"	2024	Novv Kim (Novv)	
"Gold"	2024	Bang Jae Yeob	
"Imaginary Friend"	2024	VM Project Architecture	
"Girls Will Be Girls"	2025	Guzza (Kudo)	
"Rock & Roll"	2025	Jo Wonjun	
"Tunnel Vision"	2025	Minha Hwang (Rigend Film)	
"Motto"	2026	Unknown	

== Video albums ==
List of video albums
Title	Details
Itzy The 1st World Tour "Checkmate" in Seoul	Released: July 25, 2023; Label: JYP Entertainment; Formats: DVD, Blu-ray
Itzy The 1st World Tour "Checkmate" in Japan	Released: August 30, 2023; Label: Warner Music Japan; Formats: DVD, Blu-ray
Itzy 2nd World Tour "Born to Be" in Seoul	Released: January 10, 2025; Label: JYP Entertainment; Formats: DVD, Blu-ray
