= DYT =

DYT may refer to:

- Dzongkhag yargye tshogchung (district development committee) organisations in districts of Bhutan
- "DYT", a song by South Korean girl group Itzy
- Sky Harbor Airport & Seaplane Base, IATA code DYT
- DYT productions, producers of Australian television series The Go!! Show
