= Itzy =

South Korean girl group

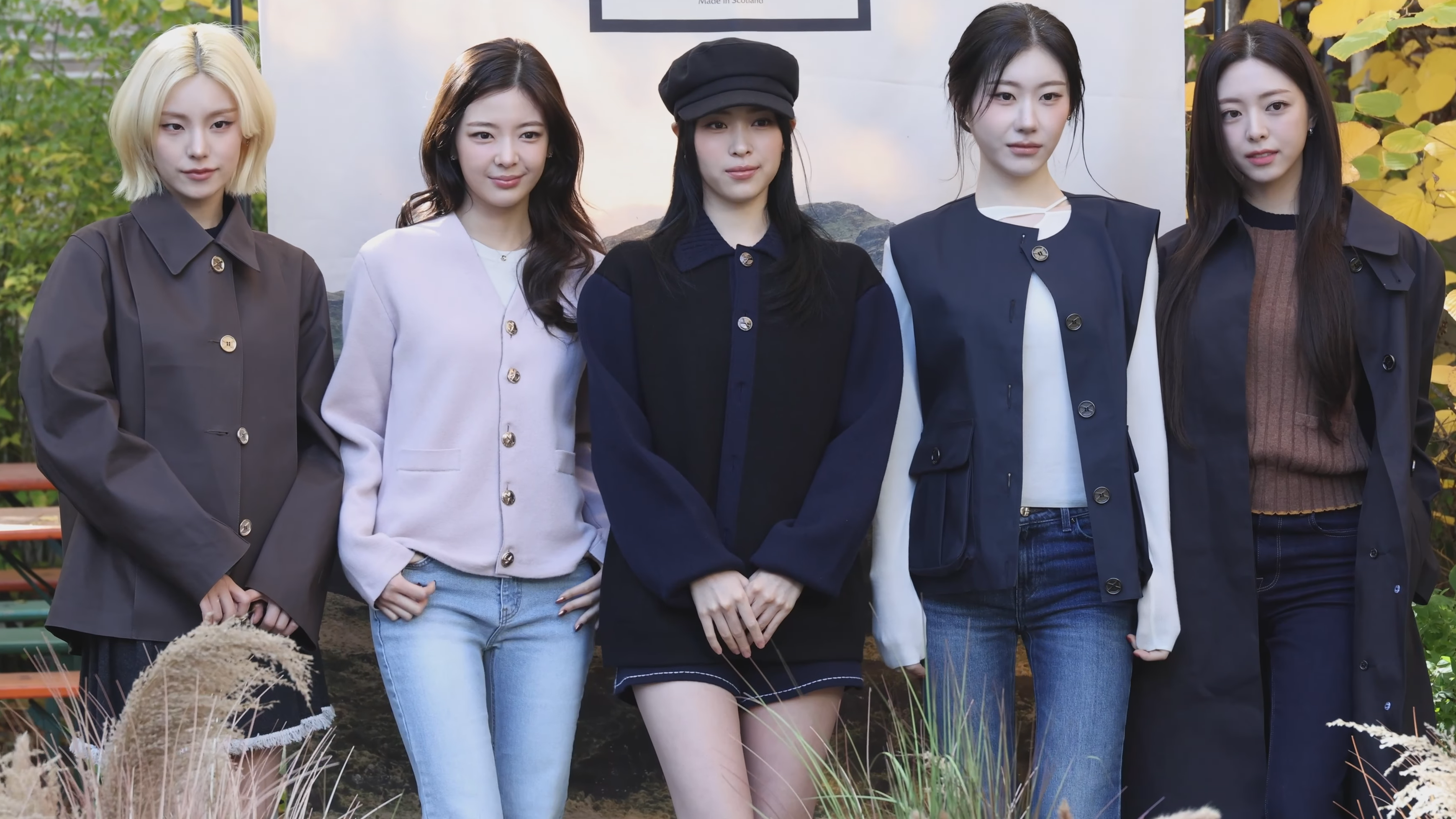
- Itzy in November 2025; L–R: Yeji, Lia, Ryujin, Chaeryeong, and Yuna

Background information
- Origin: Seoul, South Korea
- Genres: K-pop; J-pop
- Works: Discography; songs; live performances
- Years active: 2019–present
- Labels: JYP; Warner Japan; Republic
- Members: Yeji; Lia; Ryujin; Chaeryeong; Yuna
- Website: itzy.jype.com

Itzy (/ˈɪtsi/; Korean: 있지; stylized in all caps) is a South Korean girl group formed by JYP Entertainment. The group consists of five members: Yeji, Lia, Ryujin, Chaeryeong, and Yuna. They are recognized for their "teen crush" concept and for exploring themes of independence and self-love in their music.

Itzy debuted on February 12, 2019, with the single album It'z Different and its lead single "Dalla Dalla", which emerged as the best-performing girl group song of the year in South Korea. It peaked at number two on South Korea's Circle Digital Chart, the Billboard K-pop Hot 100, and the Billboard World Digital Song Sales Chart, while its music video set a new record for the most views in 24 hours for a K-pop debut. Later that year, Itzy became the first K-pop girl group in history to achieve a "Rookie Grand Slam", winning all five major Rookie of the Year awards.

Between 2019 and 2021, Itzy released four extended plays (EPs): It'z Icy, It'z Me, Not Shy, and Guess Who, each producing top-ten singles in South Korea, including "Icy", "Wannabe", "Not Shy", and "In the Morning". In 2021, they released their debut studio album Crazy in Love, which debuted at number 11 on the US Billboard 200. In 2022, their fifth EP, Checkmate, became their first to sell over one million copies and entered the Billboard 200 top ten, reaching number eight. Its lead single "Sneakers" rose to number five on the Circle Digital Chart and topped the Billboard South Korea Songs Chart. Following their Checkmate World Tour, the group released two more million-selling EPs: Cheshire (2022) and Kill My Doubt (2023).

Itzy made their official Japanese debut in 2022 with the singles "Voltage" and "Blah Blah Blah", both of which peaked at number three on the Oricon Singles Chart. Their first Japanese studio album, Ringo (2023), reached number seven on the Oricon Combined Albums Chart and number five on the Billboard Japan Hot Albums Chart. In 2024, Itzy released their eighth EP, Born to Be, and embarked on the Born to Be World Tour. In the same year, they released their ninth EP, Gold, which marked their seventh appearance on the Billboard 200. This was followed in 2025 by their tenth EP, Girls Will Be Girls, their second Japanese studio album, Collector, and their eleventh EP, Tunnel Vision.

== Name ==
The group's name is derived from the Korean word itji (있지), which means 'to have'. The members say it means they have everything their fans want. As Lia put it, "'Itzy' means 'to have' in Korean. We have everything you guys expect in us. So, 'all in us', that's what we say all the time".

== History ==
=== 2015–2018: Pre-debut activities ===
Before their debut, Itzy's members each followed unique paths within the K-pop industry. Chaeryeong and her sister initially auditioned for Fantagio but did not pass. Both were later discovered by JYP Entertainment (JYP) through the television series K-pop Star 3. In 2015, Chaeryeong participated in JYP's survival show Sixteen, which formed the girl group Twice. Although she didn't make the final lineup, she became the first member to join Itzy and trained with JYP for five years prior to debut.

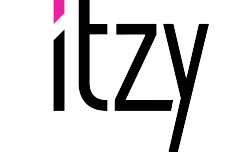
Itzy's official logo

Ryujin was scouted at a Got7 concert and trained with JYP for four years leading up to Itzy's debut. Yuna and Yeji both joined JYP in 2015 after passing auditions and trained for three years. Yuna was discovered at a music festival, while Yeji secured her place through an audition. Lia was initially accepted as a trainee by SM Entertainment after passing a global audition in Canada but backed out due to her parents' concerns. She later auditioned for JYP and trained for two years prior to the group's debut.

In 2017, Yuna and Ryujin appeared in BTS's "Love Yourself" highlight reel. That same year, all members except Lia appeared on the Mnet reality show Stray Kids. Ryujin competed on JTBC's survival show Mix Nine, where she placed first among female contestants, while Yeji participated in SBS's The Fan.

=== 2019: Debut with It'z Different and It'z Icy ===
On January 21, 2019, JYP Entertainment announced the debut of a new girl group, their first since Twice in 2015 and their first idol group overall since Stray Kids in 2017. A trailer introducing the five members was released the same day. Itzy officially debuted on February 12, with the release of their single album It'z Different, featuring the lead single "Dalla Dalla". The song blends various EDM elements, including a bass house verse, electro house chorus, and a trap-influenced bridge. Its empowering message of self-confidence was well received by critics and audiences alike.

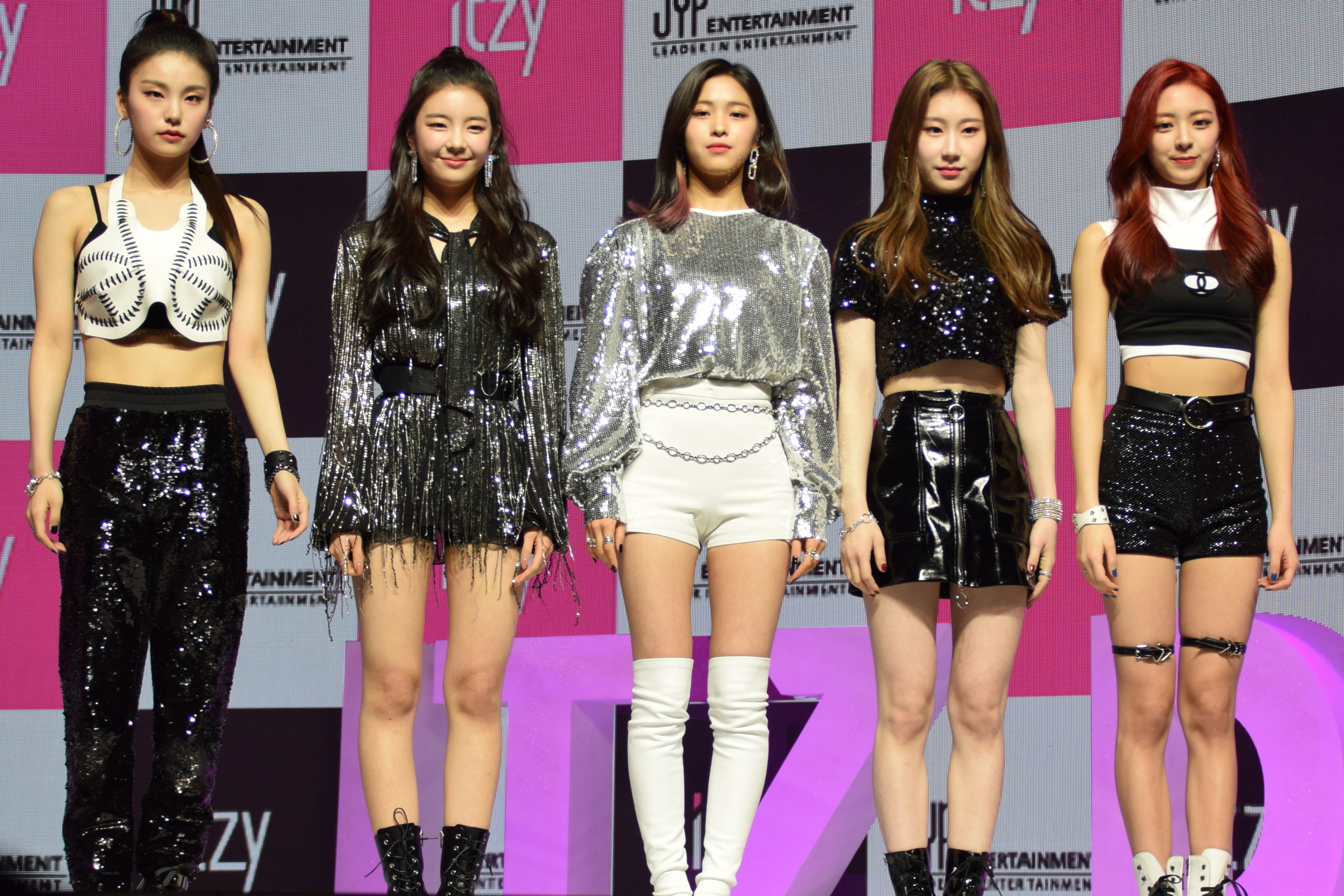
Itzy at their debut showcase in March 2019

"Dalla Dalla" marked one of the strongest debuts for a new K-pop act in years, entering at number three and peaking at number two on the Billboard World Digital Song Sales chart. It sold 2,000 downloads in the US during its first week, making it the best-selling K-pop song in the country at the time. The music video amassed over 17.1 million views within its first day, setting a record for the most views in 24 hours by a K-pop debut music video. Eight days after their debut, Itzy won their first music-show trophy on M Countdown, breaking the record for the fastest girl group to earn a music-show win. "Dalla Dalla" went on to achieve nine music-show wins and became the fastest debut music video by a K-pop group to surpass 100 million views.

On July 29, Itzy released their first extended play (EP), It'z Icy, featuring the lead single "Icy". The EP was a commercial success, peaking at number three on the Gaon Album Chart. "Icy" continued the group's success on music-shows, earning 12 wins, including a triple crown on Show Champion. In September, JYP announced Itzy's showcase tour, titled Itzy Premiere Showcase Tour "Itzy? Itzy!". The tour began in Jakarta on November 2 and continued through various cities in Asia, concluding with five US stops in January 2020.

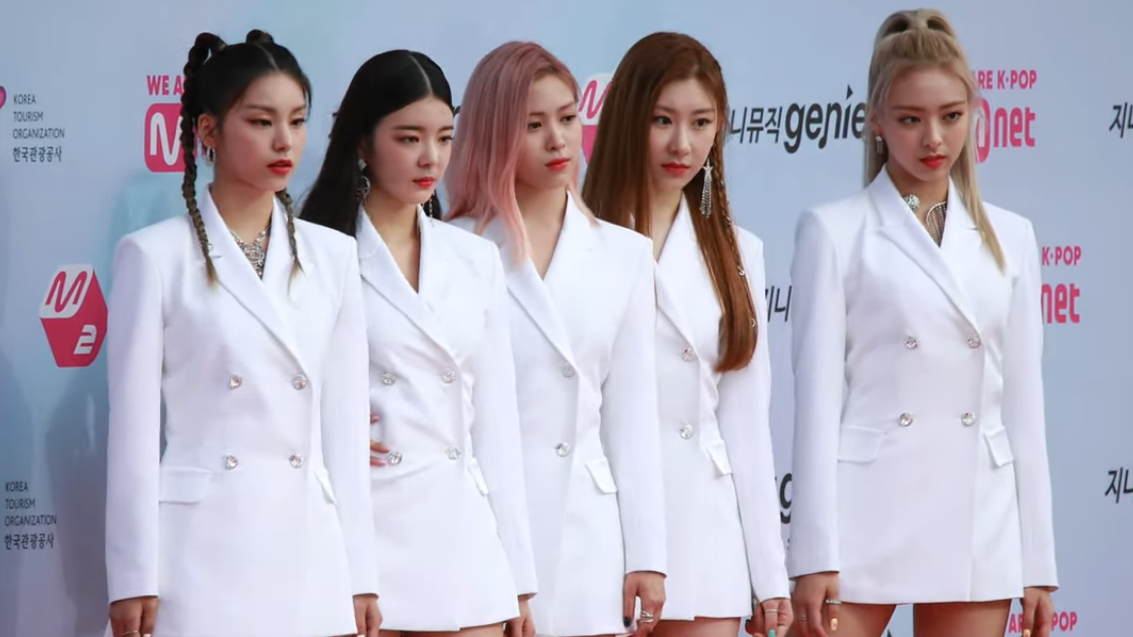
Itzy at the 2019 Genie Music Awards

Later that year, "Dalla Dalla" surpassed 100 million streams on the Gaon Music Chart, earning a platinum certification from the Korea Music Content Association (KMCA). It became the first debut song by a K-pop group to achieve this milestone since the KMCA began issuing streaming certifications in 2018. The song was ranked eighth on Dazed's list of "The 20 Best K-pop Songs of 2019", which commended the group's confident and refreshing debut. Both "Dalla Dalla" and "Icy" were among the most popular YouTube music videos in South Korea that year, ranking second and seventh, respectively. By the end of 2019, the group made history by achieving a "Rookie Grand Slam", winning all five major Rookie of the Year awards from the 34th Golden Disc Awards, 9th Gaon Chart Music Awards, 2019 Melon Music Awards, 2019 Mnet Asian Music Awards, and 29th Seoul Music Awards. They also won Rookie of the Year at the 2019 Genie Music Awards and the 4th Asia Artist Awards, and were nominated for Best Korean Act at the 2019 MTV Europe Music Awards.

=== 2020–2021: US showcase tour, Japanese debut, and commercial success ===
In early 2020, Itzy embarked on the US leg of their showcase tour. Their first show was in Los Angeles on January 17. On March 9, they released their second EP, It'z Me, led by the single "Wannabe". The EP explores themes of freedom, individuality, and self-confidence, with production contributed by Sophie. It'z Me debuted at number one on South Korea's Gaon Album Chart, marking Itzy's first chart-topping album in their home country. It also reached number five on the Billboard World Albums chart, the group's highest position on the chart at the time. The group went on to achieve eight music-show wins with "Wannabe".

On August 17, 2020, Itzy released their third EP, Not Shy, as well as the music video for the lead single of the same name. While retaining their signature "teen crush" pop sound, the EP marked a subtle lyrical shift as the group began exploring themes of love and self-expression, complementing their ongoing messages of independence and self-confidence. Not Shy debuted at number one on the Gaon Album Chart, selling over 219,000 copies, and secured five music-show wins during its promotion.

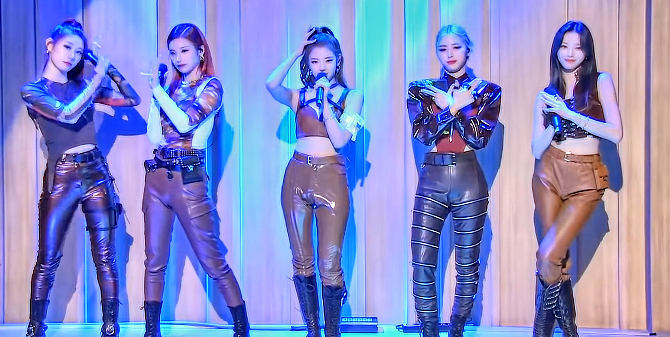
Itzy at SBS Power FM in May 2021

On March 20, 2021, Itzy released the digital single "Trust Me (Midzy)", dedicated to their fans, as part of their first global livestream event. Following this, their fourth EP, Guess Who, and its lead single "In the Morning" were released on April 30. "In the Morning" peaked at number 22 on the Billboard Global Excl. US chart and number 34 on the Billboard Global 200 chart. The EP debuted at number 148 on the US Billboard 200, their first appearance on the chart, and was later certified Platinum by Korea Music Content Association (KMCA). An English version of "In the Morning" was released on May 14.

On July 1, Itzy collaborated with Second Aunt KimDaVi on the digital single "Break Ice", released through VIVO WAVE and distributed by Genie Music and Stone Music Entertainment. On September 1, it was announced that Itzy would be making their Japanese debut through Warner Japan with the EP What'z Itzy, and on September 24, they released their first full-length studio album Crazy in Love. Its lead single "Loco" earned the group their first nomination for Best K-Pop at the MTV Video Music Awards. The album also features the B-side tracks "Swipe" and "#Twenty". It debuted at number 11 on the Billboard 200, setting a new career high. Crazy in Love was certified Platinum by the KMCA in November 2021 for over 250,000 copies sold, and achieved 2× Platinum status in February 2022 after surpassing 500,000 copies. On December 22, 2021, the group released their first Japanese compilation album titled It'z Itzy.

=== 2022–2023: Checkmate world tour, international expansion, and Lia's hiatus ===
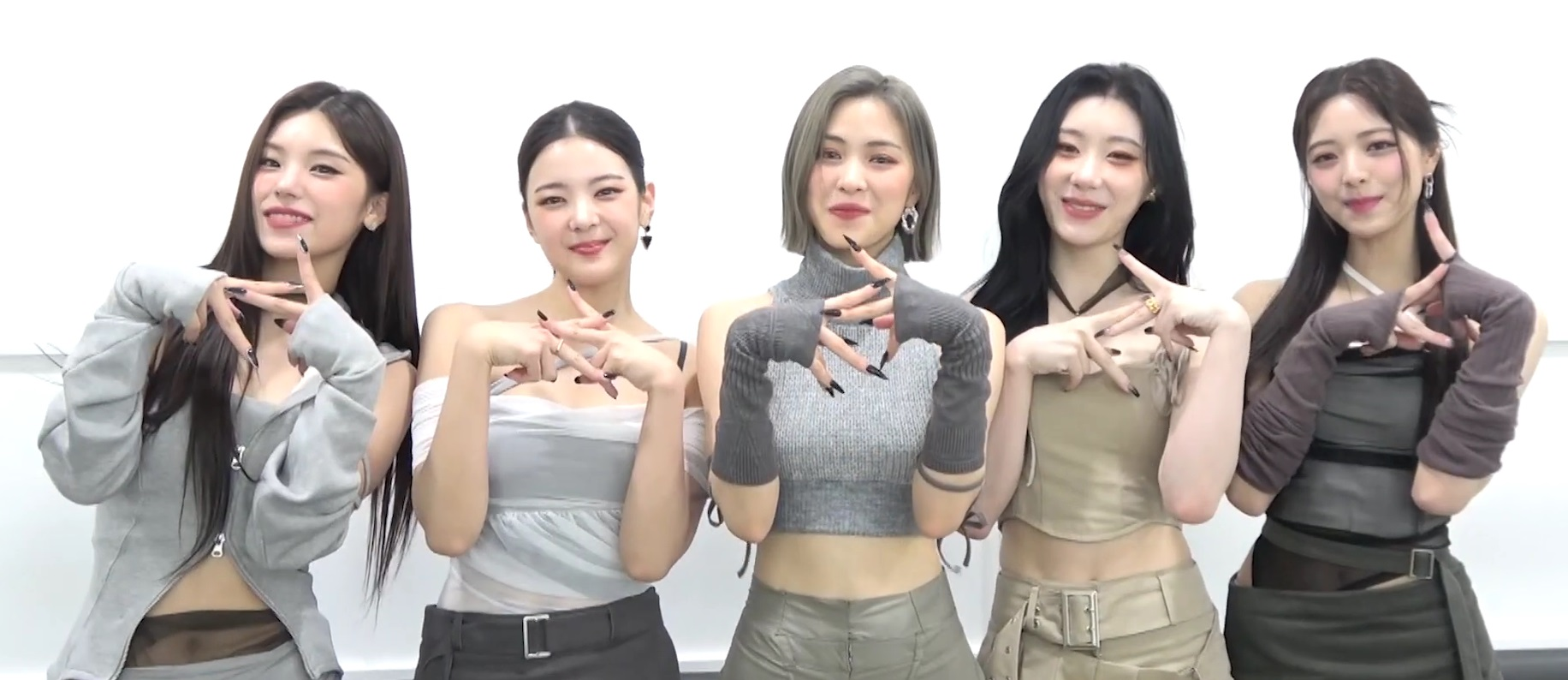
Itzy in January 2023

On February 10, 2022, Billboard reported that Republic Records and JYP Entertainment expanded their strategic partnership to include Itzy, which had previously involved only Twice. On April 6, the group released their first Japanese single "Voltage". Their fifth EP, Checkmate, and its lead single "Sneakers" were released on July 15. It was also announced that the group would embark on their first world tour, the Checkmate World Tour, with opening shows in Seoul on August 6 and 7. Itzy followed with their second Japanese single "Blah Blah Blah" on October 5, and their first English single "Boys Like You" on October 21.

On November 30, they released their sixth EP, Cheshire, alongside the lead single of the same name. On July 31, 2023, Itzy released their seventh EP, Kill My Doubt, led by the single "Cake". Ahead of the EP's release, the music video for B-side "Bet on Me" was released on July 3, followed by "None of My Business" on July 24. The group held a showcase at the SK Olympic Handball Gymnasium on the day of the EP's release.

Following early reports in February 2023 about Itzy's first Japanese studio album, the group officially announced Ringo on August 7. Its lead single of the same name was digitally pre-released on September 27, ahead of the album's full release on October 18. On September 18, JYP Entertainment announced that member Lia would go on a temporary hiatus from the group due to symptoms of extreme tension and anxiety. Lia also shared a handwritten letter with fans, writing, "I came to realize that I've been gradually losing myself while running up to this point".

=== 2024–2025: Born to Be world tour, solo endeavors, and Lia's return ===
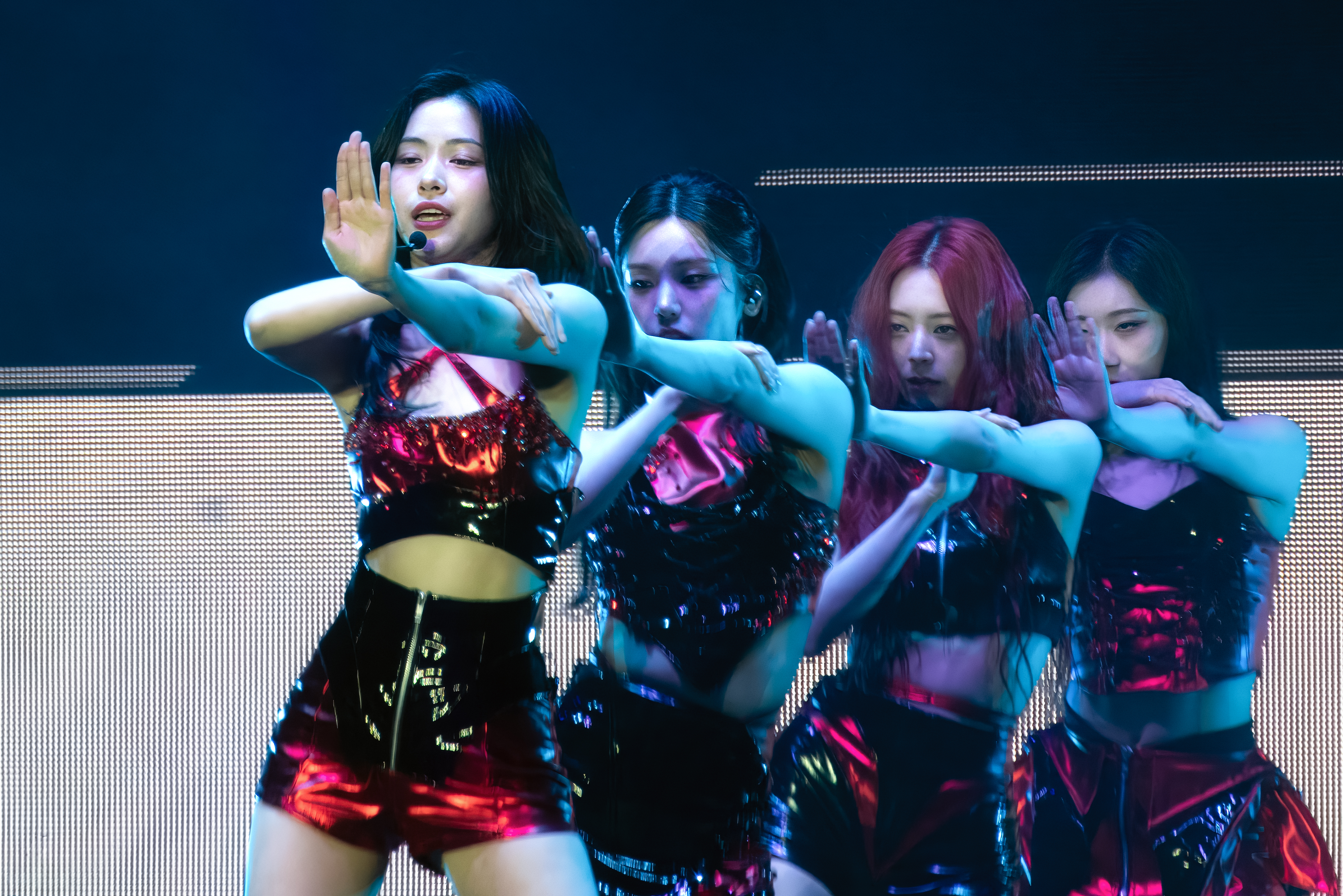
Itzy performing as a quartet in 2024

On January 8, 2024, Itzy released their eighth EP, Born to Be, alongside the single "Untouchable". The EP features the first solo tracks for each member of the group, including Lia, as well as the single "Mr. Vampire". On January 26, it was announced that Itzy would embark on their second world tour, the Born to Be World Tour, beginning in Seoul on February 24 and 25 at the Jamsil Indoor Stadium. The tour concluded in August 2024, totaling 32 performances across 28 regions.

Ahead of their four planned concerts in Japan, Itzy released their third Japanese single "Algorhythm" on May 15. On July 9, JYP Entertainment announced that Lia would be resuming activities with the group, stating, "Following treatment and rest, her tension and symptoms of anxiety have significantly improved". The day before, she joined the other members in a live stream, marking the group's first appearance together as five since the previous year. Itzy's ninth EP, Gold, was released on October 15, with the music video for its lead single of the same name. The music video for "Imaginary Friend", the EP's second single, followed on October 27.

On June 9, 2025, Itzy released their tenth EP, Girls Will Be Girls, accompanied by the music video for its lead single of the same name. On September 20, JYP Entertainment confirmed that all members of Itzy had renewed their contracts with the company. The group released their second Japanese studio album, Collector, on October 8. The album was led by the single "Rock & Roll" and included Japanese versions of the group's previous singles. On November 10, Itzy released their 11th EP, Tunnel Vision, along with its lead single of the same name.

=== 2026–present: Tunnel Vision world tour and Motto ===
The group embarked on their third world tour, Tunnel Vision, which began with three shows at Jamsil Indoor Stadium in Seoul from February 13 to 15, 2026. While on tour, the group released their 12th EP, Motto, together with the lead single of the same name.

== Endorsements ==
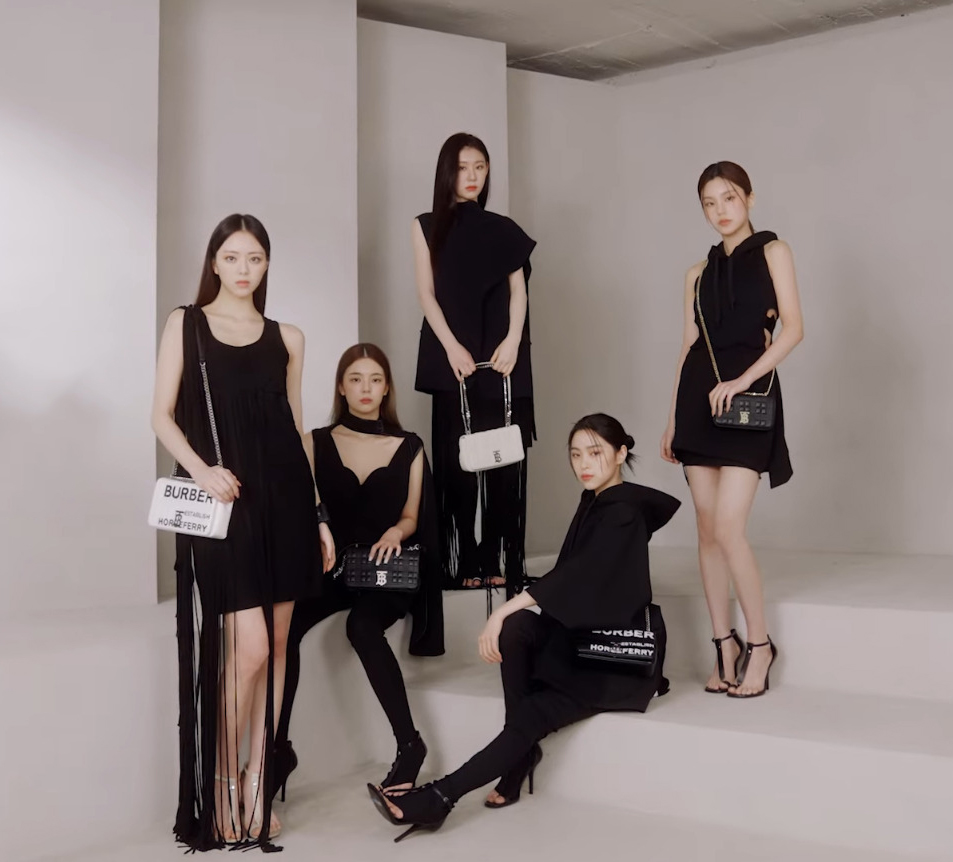
Itzy for Marie Claire Korea X Burberry in 2022

Since their debut in 2019, Itzy has participated in various brand collaborations and advertising campaigns. One of their earliest partnerships was with Kia Motors, which featured "Soul Booster" cars in the music video for their debut single "Dalla Dalla", followed by a choreography video promoting the collaboration. That year, the group endorsed Lotte Duty Free, Andar, and MAC Cosmetics. They also promoted domestic brands Dongseo Food and CJ CheilJedang, which released limited edition products promoted through a themed music video.

In 2020, Itzy collaborated with Line Friends to create a series of character dolls called "WDZY", each representing a member of the group. In 2021, they were named global spokesmodels for Maybelline New York, becoming the first Korean artists to hold the position. That same year, the group also endorsed the South Korean contact lens brand Claren.

In 2022, Itzy took part in several international and regional endorsement campaigns. They promoted Pokémon Legends: Arceus and the Pokémon Card Game in January, followed by Pokémon Unite in July, alongside the release of a promotional video titled Pokémon Unite / Itzy Special Show!. The group also participated in the Adidas Members Week at the Adidas Hongdae Center and modeled for H&M's Spring/Summer campaign. Later that year, they were named brand ambassadors for Bench and Charles & Keith. In 2023, Itzy was named brand ambassadors for G-Shock, and endorsers for the mobile game Mobile Legends: Bang Bang. They also appeared in a television commercial for Mega MGC Coffee.

== Members ==
- Yeji (예지) – leader, dancer, vocalist
- Lia (리아) – vocalist
- Ryujin (류진) – rapper, dancer, vocalist
- Chaeryeong (채령) – dancer, vocalist
- Yuna (유나) – dancer, rapper, vocalist

== Discography ==
Korean albums

- Crazy in Love (2021)

Japanese albums

- Ringo (2023)
- Collector (2025)

== Filmography ==
=== Web shows ===
Year	Title	Note(s)	Ref.
2019–present	Itzy? Itzy!	Premiered on February 20, 2019	
2019	I See Itzy	Premiered on August 7, 2019	
2019	A to Z <M2 Special – Itzy Vlog> "Itzy in Paris"	Premiered on November 14, 2019	
2019–2023	Itzy It'z Tourbook	Premiered on December 13, 2019	
2020	100 Hours of Romantic Travel "Paris et Itzy"	Premiered on January 21, 2020	
2020	Bu:Quest of Itzy	Premiered on July 7, 2020	
2020	Itzy in Korea	Premiered on November 26, 2020	
2021	2TZY: Hello 2021	Premiered on January 6, 2021	
2021	It'z Playtime	Premiered on February 8, 2021	
2021	CSI: Codename Secret Itzy	Premiered on March 2, 2021	
2021–present	Itzy Vlog	Premiered on March 26, 2021	
2021	CSI: Codename Secret Itzy Season 2	Premiered on August 17, 2021	
2022	Itzy V2log: Hello 2022	Premiered on March 4, 2022	
2022	Itzy Cozy House	Premiered on May 4, 2022	
2022	I'm in LA (LA@Itzy)	Premiered on September 21, 2022	
2023	My Favorite Itzy	Premiered on October 4, 2023	
2024	IT'ZZZ	Premiered on February 8, 2024	
2024	IT'ZZZ Season 2	Premiered on November 14, 2024	

== Concerts and tours ==
- Checkmate World Tour (2022–2023)
- Born to Be World Tour (2024)
- Tunnel Vision World Tour (2026)
