= Motto (EP) =

- Digital cover

EP by Itzy
- Released: May 18, 2026
- Length: 23:38
- Languages: Korean; English
- Labels: JYP; Republic

Itzy chronology
Tunnel Vision (2025)	Motto (2026)

Singles from Motto
- 1. "Motto" Released: May 18, 2026

Motto is the 12th extended play (EP) by South Korean girl group Itzy, released on May 18, 2026, through JYP Entertainment and Republic Records. Conceptualized as a "direct love letter" to their fandom, the EP features eight tracks led by the single of the same name, including five solo tracks revealed during the Tunnel Vision World Tour (2026).

== Background ==
Itzy released their 11th extended play (EP) Tunnel Vision on November 10, 2025, to mixed critical and commercial reception. Collaborating with a team of producers including Dem Jointz and Kenzie, the EP explored themes of passion and focus while experimenting on genres like R&B and Afrobeats. In support of the EP, the group embarked on the Tunnel Vision World Tour (2026), where they debuted a number of solo songs they later confirmed to be part of their upcoming release. While on tour, album track "Thats a No No" from It'z Me (2020) experienced a surge in popularity and member Yuna made her solo debut with Ice Cream.

== Music and lyrics ==
[With] 'Motto,' I wanted to thank Midzy for staying with us, for being the biggest part of who we are, and show that [they] are our motto

— Yeji, describing Motto to the press.

Motto has a runtime of 23 minutes and 38 seconds across eight tracks. Yeji described the EP as a "direct love letter" to their fans who had supported them throughout their career. Having explored "darker themes" in Girls Will Be Girls (2025) and Tunnel Vision (2025), she added that Motto aims to show a "brighter side of Itzy once again". Thematically, the EP continues exploring themes of "bold concepts and empowering messages" while emphasizing the members' individuality.

=== Songs ===
Opening track "Motto" is conceptualized as a "vibrant pop anthem" that represents the bond between the group and their fandom.

== Marketing ==
On April 22, 2026, JYP Entertainment announced Motto as Itzy's 12th extended play through a trailer directed by Léa Esmaili, which features surrealist scenes in a pastel palette. A series of videos featuring brief interviews with the members titled "What's Your Motto" was released sequentially in the days leading up to the EP's release.

The EP was released on May 18, together with its lead single of the same name and its corresponding music video.

== Track listing ==
Motto track listing
No.	Title	Lyrics	Music	Arrangement	Length
1.	"Motto"	Gu Seong-min (Artiffect); Bang Hye-hyun; Noday	Rouno; Justin Reinstein; Morgan Kubes	Rouno; Justin Reinstein	3:13
2.	"Glitch"	Im Hyun-a (Jamfactory)	Ludwig "Loui" Lindell; Jasmine (UP); Hwaji (UP)	Ludwig "Loui" Lindell	3:16
3.	"You and I"	Yu Ji-sang	Kim Ju-hyeong; Arineh Karimi; BB Elliot	Kim Ju-hyeong	3:07
4.	"Pocket" (Yeji solo)	Lov3notdxxd	Lov3notdxxd; Frankie Day (The Hub); Ayushy (The Hub)	Lov3notdxxd	2:23
5.	"Asylum" (Lia solo)	Julia Ross; Ash Minor	Lee Woo-min "Collapsedone"; MRCH	Collapsedone	3:35
6.	"Look" (Ryujin solo)	Kass	Kass	Kass	2:06
7.	"Undefined" (Chaeryeong solo)	Minkyu; Seora	Lee Hae-sol; Maria Marcus	Lee	2:40
8.	"Tangerine" (Yuna solo)	Sim Eun-ji	Sim Eun-ji	Sim Eun-ji	3:18
Total length:					23:38

== Charts ==
=== Weekly charts ===
Weekly chart performance
Chart (2026)	Peak position
Japanese Albums (Oricon)	31
Japanese Digital Albums (Oricon)	15
Japanese Hot Albums (Billboard Japan)	97
South Korean Albums (Circle)	4
US Top Album Sales (Billboard)	16
US World Albums (Billboard)	7

=== Monthly charts ===
Monthly chart performance
Chart (2026)	Peak position
South Korean Albums (Circle)	12

== Certifications ==
Certifications for Motto
Region	Certification	Certified units/sales
South Korea (KMCA)	Platinum	250,000^{^}
^{^} Shipments figures based on certification alone.

== Publication lists ==
Publication lists for "Motto"
Critic/Publication	List	Rank	Ref.
Billboard	The 25 Best K-Pop Albums of 2026 (So Far): Critic's Picks	25	

== Release history ==
Release dates and formats
Region	Date	Format	Version	Label
Various	May 18, 2026	CD; digital download; streaming	Standard	JYP; Republic
United States	May 22, 2026	CD	Standard	JYP; Republic
