= Guess Who (EP) =

- Digital cover

EP by Itzy
- Released: April 30, 2021
- Studio: JYPE Studios
- Genres: Hip hop; dance; trap; R&B
- Length: 18:58
- Languages: Korean; English
- Label: JYP
- Producers: Park Jin-young; Earattack; JQ

Itzy chronology
Not Shy (2020)	Guess Who (2021)	What'z Itzy (2021)

Singles from Guess Who
- 1. "In the Morning" Released: April 30, 2021

Guess Who (stylized as GUE?? WHO) is the fourth extended play by South Korean girl group Itzy. It was released by JYP Entertainment on April 30, 2021. The EP was released for pre-order on March 22, and contains six tracks, including the lead single "In the Morning". The physical album comes in three versions: Day, Night, and Day&Night. The EP is primarily a rap-styled K-pop record that combines EDM, hip hop, dance, dance-pop, trap, Latin trap and bossa nova elements.

Guess Who was subject to generally mixed reviews from music critics, who complimented the record's cohesiveness; however, some found the material controlling the vitality of the group. The EP was commercially successful, marking Itzy's first entry on the US Billboard 200, peaking at number 148, and peaking at number 2 on the Gaon Album Chart. In May 2021, Guess Who was certified Platinum by the Korea Music Content Association.

The lead single, "In the Morning", peaked at number 10 on the Gaon Digital Chart, becoming the group's fifth top-ten single, as well as the group's third single to enter the top five of the Billboard World Digital Song Sales chart. To promote the EP, the group performed on several South Korean music show programs, such as M Countdown and Inkigayo.

== Background ==
On March 22, Itzy released the first poster for their upcoming EP, Guess Who. This was posted alongside pre-order information and a preview of the EP content. JYP Entertainment said in a statement that the upcoming release would feature a sound that "come as a surprise for their fans". The label added that the group "would come up with offbeat dance moves and styling to showcase something different this time". On April 12, 2021, the group unveiled the track listing to the EP on the group's official SNS accounts and website, revealing "In the Morning" as the lead single. The next day, the night version of a group teaser was revealed. The next group teaser was released on April 14. Starting from April 15, a series of teasers were posted everyday for the group's official social media. On April 25, Itzy released the highlight medley for their EP. The first music video teaser for "In the Morning" was released on April 26. On the next day, the second music video teaser for the song was published. On April 28, the third music video teaser for the lead single was published.

== Composition ==
The standard edition of Guess Who is slightly under nineteen minutes long. The album features six songs which incorporate elements from country strings to lo-fi rhythms, and showcase the band's vocal skills. "In the Morning" was co-written and co-produced by JYP Entertainment founder Park Jin-young, who had previously worked on two of the group's hit singles, "Icy" and "Not Shy". Other producers featured on the record include hitmakers Earattack, who worked with Got7, and frequent Kang Daniel collaborator JQ. During a press event for the EP, the members shared that the title of Guess Who refers to how they show different emotions and personas in the songs while exploring their musicality.

Personally, I think we'll be able to show our fans a deeper and more mature side of us through this album. This album is not just bright with happy songs, it's like our own takes and immersions complete the music and performance. Compared to the previous ones, I think our expressions and [the] stories we're telling may be the main point of this album

— Chaeryeong on the album's meaning.

=== Songs ===
Inspired by the popular game Mafia, "In the Morning" is a "powerful" hip hop track with an "addictive" dance-trap composition, heightening the track's core concepts of ambiguity and suspense. The track's chorus sees the group explore various vocal styles backed by a "trippy" synth. Lyrically, the song is about secretly stealing someone's heart. The second song, "Sorry Not Sorry" is a "playful" and "laidback" track with a bouncy rock-inflected production that "highlights the title's devil-may-care attitude". "Kidding Me", the third song, is an EDM song with a strong hip-hop beat and direct warning about demanding to be taken more seriously. The song features trap drums and a "compelling" dance break. The fourth song, "Wild Wild West" is a track with guitar loops and a sound reminiscent of western American music. The song addresses a dangerous, unexpected attraction. Sofiana Ramli from NME described it as "a fun epilogue to their rodeo-themed Not Shy". The fifth track, "Shoot!" is a "boss-like" bossa nova and Latin trap song about slowly luring people into a lovestruck spell. It employs a "futuristic" sound with a variety of musical instruments. The closing track, "Tennis (0:0)" is a soft medium dance-pop and bubblegum pop track. The song combines the five members' "sweet" voices with ordinary instruments such as an acoustic guitar and analog drum beats. The track's title and lyrics refer to a game of tennis and how it ends with a score of 0:0, symbolizing that at the end it is "all about love and not winning fights". In an interview with NME Ryujin revealed that she was inspired by Selena Gomez's "Bad Liar" while recording "Tennis".

== Promotion ==
On March 2, 2021, JYP Entertainment uploaded a teaser poster with the EP's name, also announcing the release date. Pre-orders for the album began on March 22. On April 12, Itzy revealed the title of the album's lead single "In the Morning" and posted the album's track list. Guess Who was released worldwide on April 30 through JYP in conjunction with the music video for "In the Morning". In celebration of their comeback, the group held an online press conference an hour before the release to talk about the album. On May 1, Itzy appeared on the South Korean TV show Knowing Bros.

=== Singles ===
"In the Morning" was released as the lead single from Guess Who on April 30, 2021. An accompanying music video for the song, was uploaded to JYP's YouTube channel simultaneously with the single's release. In three days, the music video reached fifty million views. Itzy promoted the song with televised live performances on various South Korean music programs including M Countdown, Show! Music Core, Music Bank and Inkigayo.

== Critical reception ==
Professional ratings
Review scores
Source	Rating
IZM	2/5 stars
NME	4/5 stars
Pitchfork	5.5/10

Sofiana Ramli of NME awarded the extended play 4 out of 5 stars, describing it as "by far Itzy's most cohesive project in terms of sound". The reviewer commended the hip hop musical direction on this record as the girl group "seem to have successfully found a brand of maximalist pop that works for them." In a mixed review, Joshua Minsoo Kim of Pitchfork found that, although their debut "established the quintet as a massive new force in the industry", their latest release, Guess Who, was a disappointment, commenting that with the EP, Itzy "became more uncomfortable being themselves in the process". IZM's Dayeol Jeong felt the album "which must passively follow a set direction, controls the vitality of the five girls."

== Commercial performance ==
On April 28, Guess Who surpassed 260,000 preorders, making it their best-selling album surpassing Not Shy with 200,000 copies. According to Korea’s Hanteo Chart, the EP garnered sales of 200,130 copies in the first week of release from April 30 to May 6. The EP debuted at number 1 on the Gaon Retail Album Chart with 58,291 copies sold in a week. In South Korea, Guess Who debuted and peaked at number 2 for the week ending May 1, 2021. The EP also entered at number 5 on the Gaon Album Chart for the month of April 2021 with less than a day of tracking and selling 232,570 copies. All songs from Guess Who entered the Gaon Download Chart. Hugh McIntyre of Forbes described the EP as a bestseller in South Korea. It was later certified as Platinum for over 250,000 shipments in Korea by the Korea Music Content Association.

In the US, the album entered various charts. It debuted and peaked at number 148 on the US Billboard 200, becoming the sixth highest-peaking album by a Korean female artist on the chart and making Itzy the seventh South Korean female artist to break into the chart, after BoA, Girls' Generation, 2NE1, Blackpink, Twice and Loona. It also entered at number 2 on the US World Albums Chart, earning the group third top ten entry. It also entered at number 1 on the US Heetseekers Albums, becoming their highest-charting album on the chart and becoming their best-selling project in the country. In the same week, Itzy also ranked at number 99 on the Billboard Artist 100 Chart.

In the UK, the album debuted at number 34 on the UK Album Downloads Chart for the week ending May 9, 2021 becoming the group's first ever entry on the chart.

== Track listing ==
Guess Who track listing
No.	Title	Lyrics	Music	Arrangement	Length
1.	"In the Morning" (마.피.아. In the morning; Ma.pi.a. in the Morning)	J.Y. Park "The Asiansoul"; Kass; Danke (Lalala Studio); Lyre	Lyre; J.Y. Park "The Asiansoul"; Earattack; Kass; Lee Hae-sol	Lyre; J.Y. Park "The Asiansoul"; Lee Hae-sol; Earattack	2:52
2.	"Sorry Not Sorry"	JQ (MUMW); J14 (Full8loom); Tomboy (MUMW)	Shim Eun-ji; Lee Min-young (EastWest); Yeul (1by1)	Lee Min-young (EastWest); Yeul (1by1)	3:09
3.	"Kidding Me"	Kobee; Holy M; Kass	Kobee; Holy M	Kobee; Holy M	3:33
4.	"Wild Wild West"	Earattack	Andy Love (153/Joombas); Earattack	Earattack	3:23
5.	"Shoot!"	Lee Ha-jin; Mad Clown; Kim Seung-min	Alexander Pavelich; Maria Hazell; Jerker Olov Hansson; Gigi Grombacher; Joakim Harestad Haukaas; Evard Førre Erfjord	Joki; Evard Førre Erfjord	2:19
6.	"Tennis (0:0)"	JQ (MUMW); Vacation (MUMW)	Coach & Sendo; Cazzi Opeia; Alex Chang Jien	Coach & Sendo	3:39
Total length:					18:58

== Charts ==
=== Weekly charts ===
Chart performance for Guess Who
Chart (2021–2022)	Peak position
Belgian Albums (Ultratop Flanders)	59
Belgian Albums (Ultratop Wallonia)	115
Croatian International Albums (HDU)	12
Danish Albums (Hitlisten)	23
Finnish Albums (Suomen virallinen lista)	13
Hungarian Albums (MAHASZ)	40
Japanese Albums (Oricon)	6
Japanese Hot Albums (Billboard Japan)	18
Lithuanian Albums (AGATA)	73
South Korean Albums (Gaon)	2
UK Album Downloads (Official Charts)	34
US Billboard 200	148
US Heatseekers Albums (Billboard)	1
US Independent Albums (Billboard)	25
US Indie Store Album Sales (Billboard)	9
US World Albums (Billboard)	2

=== Monthly charts ===
Monthly chart performance
Chart (2021)	Peak position
South Korean Albums (Gaon)	5

=== Year-end charts ===
Year-end chart performance
Chart (2021)	Position
South Korean Albums (Gaon)	42

== Certifications and sales figures ==
Sales certifications and figures for Guess Who
Region	Certification	Certified units/sales
South Korea (KMCA)	Platinum	365,353

== Release history ==
Release formats for Guess Who
Region	Date	Format	Label	Ref.
South Korea	April 30, 2021	CD; digital download; streaming	JYP	
Various	April 30, 2021	CD; digital download; streaming	JYP	
