= Ringo (Itzy song) =

Single by Itzy

from the album Ringo
- Language: Japanese
- Released: September 27, 2023
- Genre: J-pop
- Length: 3:29
- Label: Warner Japan
- Composers: Scott Russell Stoddart; JJean
- Lyricists: Yu-ki Kokubo; Seo Yongwon

Itzy singles chronology
"Cake" (2023)	"Ringo" (2023)	"Untouchable" (2024)

Music video
- "Ringo" on YouTube

"Ringo" is a song recorded by South Korean girl group Itzy, released as the lead single from their first Japanese studio album of the same name. The single was digitally released on September 27, 2023, through Warner Music Japan ahead of the full album's October 18 release.

== Background and release ==
On August 7, 2023, JYP Entertainment announced that Itzy would release their first Japanese album, Ringo, on October 18, 2023, through Warner Music Japan. Shortly after, the group revealed additional details about the album, including the tracklist and promotional schedule, confirming "Ringo" as the lead single. On September 27, the title track "Ringo" was released digitally ahead of the album, along with its official music video that emphasizes the song's dark fairy tale concept.

Following its release, Itzy performed the lead single live for the first time at NHK's 101 Studio in Tokyo on October 14. They held a collaboration event with Tower Records Japan for the release of Ringo from October 7 to 31. Itzy also performed "Ringo" live on November 8 as part of the acclaimed The First Take series, featuring a live band arrangement that showcased their live vocals. The performance was noted for highlighting the group's vocal strengths.

== Composition ==
"Ringo" was composed by Scott Russell Stoddart and JJean, with lyrics written by Yu-ki Kokubo and Seo Yongwon. Backing vocals are provided by Aico. The track features energetic and cinematic production, blending whimsical melodies that complement its fairy tale motif. Using the poisoned apple as a central symbol, the lyrics explore themes of self-empowerment, independence, and rewriting one's personal story.

== Music video ==
The music video for "Ringo" premiered on September 27, 2023, visually complementing the song's fairy tale-inspired themes. Set in a dark fantasy world, the video portrays Itzy as empowered heroines who reject the traditional "damsel in distress" narrative. A recurring motif throughout the video is the poisoned apple, a direct reference to the Snow White story, symbolizing both temptation and strength to take control of one's narrative.

== Credits and personnel ==
Credits adapted from Melon.

Personnel

- Itzy – vocals
- Aico – backing vocals
- Scott Russell Stoddart – composition
- JJean – composition
- Yu-ki Kokubo – lyrics
- Seo Yongwon – lyrics
- Goo Hyejin – recording
- Lee Sangyeop – recording
- Kim Min-hee – digital editing
- Lee Taesub – mixing
- Kwon Namwoo – mastering

== Release history ==
Release history for "Ringo"
Region	Date	Format	Label
Various	September 27, 2023	Digital download; streaming	JYP; Warner Japan
