= Ringo (Itzy album) =

- Limited B and digital cover

Studio album by Itzy
- Released: October 18, 2023
- Length: 36:09
- Language: Japanese
- Label: Warner Japan

Itzy chronology
Kill My Doubt (2023)	Ringo (2023)	Born to Be (2024)

Singles from Ringo
- 1. "Voltage" Released: April 6, 2022; 2. "Blah Blah Blah" Released: October 5, 2022; 3. "Ringo" Released: September 27, 2023

Ringo (Japanese for 'apple') is the first Japanese-language and second overall studio album by South Korean girl group Itzy. It was released by Warner Music Japan on October 18, 2023. Led by the lead single of the same name, the album contains 11 tracks, including the singles "Voltage" and "Blah Blah Blah"; and the Japanese versions of "Sneakers", "Cheshire", and "Trust Me (Midzy)".

== Background ==
Itzy debuted in Japan under Warner Music Japan on September 1, 2021, with the release of the compilation extended play What'z Itzy, which featured the quintet's previous singles. A compilation album featuring Japanese versions of the quintet's singles, titled It'z Itzy, was released later that year, on December 22. The group's first original Japanese-language song was released on April 6, 2022, with the release of the maxi single "Voltage". A second maxi single, titled "Blah Blah Blah", followed on October 5.

During the Japan leg of the Checkmate World Tour, in February 2023, Itzy revealed their plans for their first full-length Japanese studio album as part of a surprise announcement. On August 7, 2023, JYP Entertainment officially announced the album, Ringo, and the titles of its eleven tracks.

== Music and lyrics ==
Ringo is composed of eleven tracks. The album opens with the lead single of the same name, which is inspired by fairy tales. It carries the message of "charting one's path, instead of following the footsteps of already-written fairy tales".

The album reprises the pop-rock single "Voltage" as its fifth track, and is followed by "Spice". "Blah Blah Blah", a song characterized by a rhythmic rap and an "addictive" synth melody, is also reprised, as well as "Can't tie me down". The album closes with the re-recorded Japanese versions of three tracks previously released by the quintet: the electro-pop track "Sneakers", the dance-pop track "Cheshire", and the fan-dedicated track "Trust Me (Midzy)".

== Release and promotion ==
Ringo was released on October 18, 2023. The announcement of the album was accompanied by the release of teaser images, which depict the members with bright red apples. The album was available in eight different physical formats, all of which contained a CD. The album had two limited edition variations, one containing a DVD and the other containing ten trading cards.

The Japanese version of "Trust Me (Midzy)" and "Sugar-holic" were released ahead of the album as a promotional single on August 29, and October 11, respectively.

== Track listing ==
Ringo track listing
No.	Title	Lyrics	Music	Arrangement	Length
1.	"Ringo"	Seo Yong-won; Yu-ki Kokubo	JJean; Scott Russell Stoddart	Stoddart	3:29
2.	"Sugar-holic"	Kaz Kuwamura; Yhel	Kass; Ciara Muscat; Tim Tan	Kass	3:03
3.	"Playlist"	Mio Jorokuhji	Avenue 52; Gabe Lopez; JJean; Justin Reinstein	Gabe Lopez; Avenue 52	3:44
4.	"Style"	Kentz	Nermin Harambašić; Benjamin Sahba; Sverre Sunde; Adrian Thesen; Anne Judith Wik	Lovelypop; Pizzapunk	3:03
5.	"Voltage"	Mayu Wakisaka	Ayushy; Frankie Day; The Hub 88; Selah; Charlotte Wilson	Selah	3:41
6.	"Spice"	D&H	Kobee; Holy M	Kobee; Holy M	3:41
7.	"Blah Blah Blah"	Mio Jorakuji	Sim Eunjee; Minyoung Lee; Yeul	Eunjee; Lee; Yeul	3:06
8.	"Can't Tie Me Down"	Yo-Hei	Awry; Ayushy; The Hub 88; Selah	Selah	3:05
9.	"Sneakers" (Japanese version)	Friday; Ogi; Jessica Pierpoint; Yohei	Pierpoint; Didrik Thott; Sebastian Thott	Sebastian Thott	3:01
10.	"Cheshire" (Japanese version)	Hwang Sumin; Jeong Hari; Wakisaka	Muscat; J.A.R.; JJean; Josefin Glenmark; Reinstein; Tan	Tim Tan; Justin Reinstein	3:03
11.	"Trust Me (Midzy)" (Japanese version)	MosPick; Young Chance; Wakisaka	MosPick; Young Chance	MosPick	3:41
Total length:					36:09

Ringo Limited A bonus tracks (DVD)
No.	Title	Length
1.	""Ringo" Music Video Making Movie"
2.	""Ringo" Jacket Shooting Making Movie"
3.	"Documentary of Itzy Japan Debut Showcase "It'z Itzy""

== Charts ==
=== Weekly charts ===
Weekly chart performance for Ringo
Chart (2023)	Peak position
Japanese Albums (Oricon)	7
Japanese Combined Albums (Oricon)	7
Japanese Hot Albums (Billboard Japan)	5

=== Monthly charts ===
Monthly chart performance for Ringo
Chart (2023)	Position
Japanese Albums (Oricon)	19

== Release history ==
Release dates and formats for Ringo
Region	Date	Format	Version	Label	Ref.
Japan	October 18, 2023	CD+DVD	Limited A	Warner Japan	
Japan	October 18, 2023	CD	Limited B	Warner Japan	
Japan	October 18, 2023	CD	Regular	Warner Japan	
Japan	October 18, 2023	CD	Yeji; Lia; Ryujin; Chaeryeong; Yuna	Warner Japan	
Various	October 18, 2023	Digital download; streaming	Regular	Warner Japan	
South Korea	October 18, 2023	Digital download; streaming	Regular	JYP	
