= Sneakers (song) =

- Promotional poster

Single by Itzy

from the EP Checkmate
- Language: Korean
- Released: July 15, 2022
- Studio: JYPE Studios, Seoul
- Genre: Electropop
- Length: 2:59
- Label: JYP; Republic
- Composers: Didrik Thott; Jessica Pierpoint; Sebastian Thott
- Lyricists: Friday (Galactika); OGI (Galactika); Didrik Thott; Jessica Pierpoint

Itzy singles chronology
"Voltage" (2022)	"Sneakers" (2022)	"Blah Blah Blah" (2022)

Music video
- "Sneakers" on YouTube

"Sneakers" is a song recorded by South Korean girl group Itzy. It was released on July 15, 2022, by JYP Entertainment and Republic Records, as the lead single for their fifth extended play Checkmate. Both Korean and English versions of the song were included in the extended play. The electro-pop track was written and produced by Didrik Thott, Jessica Pierpoint, Sebastian Thott, Friday, and Ogi (Galactika). An accompanying music video was released alongside the single on YouTube featuring a royal concept.

Commercially, "Sneakers" peaked at number five on the Circle Digital Chart, becoming Itzy's highest-charting single since "Dalla Dalla" (2019) and their sixth top-ten entry on the chart. The song also peaked at number one on Billboard's South Korea Songs chart. Following its release, Itzy promoted the song with live performances on several South Korean music television programs and amassed three music show trophies.

== Background and release ==
On June 2, 2022, JYP Entertainment announced that Itzy would be releasing their fifth Korean extended play titled Checkmate on July 15, after nearly nine months since their last release Crazy in Love with "Sneakers" announced as the lead single. On June 13, the group teaser photo was released. On July 11, a highlight medley teaser video was released. On July 12, the music video teaser was released. The song, along with the music video, was released on July 15.

On August 9, 2023, JYP Entertainment announced that Itzy's album Ringo would be released on October 18 of the same year, featuring a Japanese version of the song "Sneakers".

== Composition ==
The song was written by Friday (Galactika), OGI (Galactika), Didrik Thott and Jessica Pierpoint and composed by Didrik Thott, Jessica Pierpoint and Sebastian Thott and arranged by Sebastian Thott. The English version was written by Friday (Galactika), OGI (Galactika), Didrik Thott and Jessica Pierpoint and Sophia Pae. "Sneakers" is written in both English and Korean and is composed in the key of G major, with a tempo of 120 beats per minute. Lyrically, it tells the listeners to run farther together to the moment they feel most free, wearing the sneakers that make them feel good. Rolling Stone India wrote that "Itzy's "Sneakers" undoubtedly serves as an additional chapter in the group’s growing discography, which shares stories of living life without being force-fitted into a mold".

== Music video ==
=== Background ===
A still of Itzy in a castle, from the music video for "Sneakers".

On July 12, 2022 a 20-second teaser clip was released. Again on July 13, a 15-second teaser clip was also released. Both clips reached more than 7 million views before the release. The accompanying music video was released on JYP Entertainment's YouTube channel on July 15, coinciding the album's release.

=== Synopsis and reception ===
The music video is produced by SL8 Visual Lab and it was directed by 725. The music video opens with Yeji wearing an extravagant gown walking in a hallway with framed pictures of purple sneakers. The next scene shows the quintet decked out in jewels, dancing and singing in a luxurious palace with a grand surrounding of thrones, statues, chandeliers and most notably a structure of a sneaker made using marble. The scene shifts to a military control center where they are assuming command. Later in the clip, the girl group showcase their choreography in an outer space sneaker store. The music video ends with the group striking their signature "crown" pose. Writer Gladys Yeo from NME described the music video as "playful".

== Promotion ==
Prior to the album's release, on July 15, 2022, Itzy held a live event in collaboration with Mnet called "Itzy Comeback Special Checkmate" to introduce the album and communicate with their fans. Following the release of the album, the group performed "Sneakers" on July 15 at KBS2's Music Bank. Followed by a performance on the popular American music program "MTV Fresh Out Live", on the morning of the July 16. They also promoted the single on MBC's Show! Music Core and SBS's Inkigayo on July 16. The quintet also performed the song on The Late Show with Stephen Colbert on July 22 for the talk show's "#LateShowMeMusic" series to promote the song.

== Accolades ==
"Sneakers" won three first place trophies on music programs in South Korea, winning on Music Bank on July 22, M Countdown on August 11, and Inkigayo on August 14, 2022. It received nominations for Song of the Year (Overseas) at the Asian Pop Music Awards (Hong Kong) and Artist of the Year – Global Digital Music (July) at the 12th Circle Chart Music Awards.

== Credits and personnel ==
Credits adapted from Melon.

Studio

- JYPE Studios – recording
- Studio Nomad – digital editing
- Chapel Swing Studios – mixing
- 821 Sound Mastering – mastering

Personnel

- Itzy – lead vocals
- J.Y. Park "The Asiansoul" – executive producer
- Friday (Galactika) – lyrics, vocal direction
- OGI (Galactika) – lyrics
- Didrik Thott – lyrics, composition
- Jessica Pierpoint – lyrics, composition
- Sebastian Thott– composition, arrangement, computer programming, keyboard
- Aiden – background vocals
- Sophia Pae – background vocals, English lyrics
- Choi – digital editing
- Yue – digital editing
- Park Eun-jung – recording
- Eom Se-hee – recording
- Lee Sang-yeop – recording
- Koo Hye-jin – recording
- Tony Maserati – mixing
- David K. Younghyun – mixing
- Valley Glen – mixing
- Kwon Nam-woo – mastering

== Charts ==
=== Weekly charts ===
Chart performance
Chart (2022)	Peak position
Global 200 (Billboard)	71
Hong Kong (Billboard)	19
Indonesia (Billboard)	24
Japan Hot 100 (Billboard)	62
Malaysia (Billboard)	15
Netherlands (Global 40)	31
New Zealand Hot Singles (RMNZ)	36
Singapore (Billboard)	10
Singapore (RIAS)	10
South Korea (Circle)	5
Taiwan (Billboard)	11
Vietnam (Vietnam Hot 100)	27

=== Monthly charts ===
Monthly chart performance
Chart (2022)	Position
South Korea (Circle)	6

=== Year-end charts ===
Year-end chart performance
Chart (2022)	Position
South Korea (Circle)	63

== Release history ==
Release history
Region	Date	Format	Label	Ref.
Various	July 15, 2022	Digital download; streaming	JYP; Republic	
