= Tunnel Vision (EP) =

- Digital cover

EP by Itzy
- Released: November 10, 2025
- Genre: K-pop
- Length: 16:31
- Languages: Korean; English
- Labels: JYP; Republic

Itzy chronology
Collector (2025)	Tunnel Vision (2025)	Motto (2026)

Singles from Tunnel Vision
- 1. "Tunnel Vision" Released: November 10, 2025

Tunnel Vision is the 11th extended play (EP) by South Korean girl group Itzy. It was released by JYP Entertainment on November 10, 2025, and contains six tracks, including the lead single of the same name. The EP is a blend of genres including hip-hop, industrial, dance, UK garage, R&B, and electro hyperpop. Production was handled by various producers, including Dem Jointz, Ryan Jhun, Kenzie, and Ronny Svendsen. All five members of Itzy contributed to the lyrics of opening track "Focus".

== Background and release ==
On October 17, 2025, JYP Entertainment announced that Itzy would release their 11th extended play, Tunnel Vision, on November 10. The EP was announced through a cinematic trailer, with the promotional schedule and track listing unveiled simultaneously. Prior to the announcement, the group completed a series of promotional activities in Japan, including fan meetings, alongside the release of their second Japanese studio album, Collector.

On October 29, Itzy announced the Tunnel Vision World Tour in support of the EP. A highlight medley previewing the tracks was released on October 31. Music video teasers for the lead single "Tunnel Vision" were released on November 3 and 5. The EP was released on November 10, alongside the music video for its lead single.

== Track listing ==
Tunnel Vision track listing
No.	Title	Lyrics	Music	Arrangement	Length
1.	"Focus"	Yeji; Lia; Ryujin; Chaeryeong; Yuna; Noday	Noday	Noday	1:28
2.	"Tunnel Vision"	Noday; Lee Soon-gan (Lalala Studio); Lee To-reu (Lalala Studio)	Dem Jointz; Ryan Jhun; Amanda "Kiddo" Ibanez; 8AE; Ido Nadjar	Dem Jointz; Ryan Jhun	3:05
3.	"DYT"	Kenzie	Kenzie; Jsong; Rouno	Rouno; Kenzie	2:43
4.	"Flicker"	Yu Ji-sang	Winnie; Nueve; Barun; Yui Kylee; Mai Haylee	Winnie; Nueve; Barun	2:51
5.	"Nocturne"	Choi Sang-rok (Lalala Studio)	Aeko; Enzoh; C'SA	Aeko; Enzoh	3:14
6.	"8-bit Heart"	Zisu (MUMW)	Adrian Thesen; Ronny Svendsen; Louise Lindberg; BB Elliot	Pizzapunk; Ronny Svendsen	3:10
Total length:					16:31

== Charts ==
=== Weekly charts ===
Weekly chart performance
Chart (2025–2026)	Peak position
Croatian International Albums (HDU)	15
Greek Albums (IFPI)	28
Hungarian Physical Albums (MAHASZ)	36
Japanese Albums (Oricon)	22
Japanese Combined Albums (Oricon)	39
Japanese Download Albums (Billboard Japan)	14
South Korean Albums (Circle)	3
US Top Album Sales (Billboard)	14
US World Albums (Billboard)	4

=== Monthly charts ===
Monthly chart performance
Chart (2025)	Position
South Korean Albums (Circle)	7

=== Year-end charts ===
Year-end chart performance
Chart (2025)	Position
South Korean Albums (Circle)	64

== Certifications ==
Certifications
Region	Certification	Certified units/sales
South Korea (KMCA)	Platinum	250,000^{^}
^{^} Shipments figures based on certification alone.

== Release history ==
Release history for Tunnel Vision
Region	Date	Format	Label
Various	November 10, 2025	Digital download; streaming	JYP; Republic
South Korea	November 10, 2025	CD	JYP; Republic
