= It'z Different =

2019 single album by Itzy

- Digital cover

Single album by Itzy
- Released: February 12, 2019
- Recorded: 2018
- Genre: K-pop
- Length: 6:39
- Languages: Korean; English
- Label: JYP

Itzy chronology
It'z Different (2019)	It'z Icy (2019)

Singles from It'z Different
- 1. "Dalla Dalla" Released: February 12, 2019

It'z Different (stylized as IT'z DIFFERENT) is the debut single album by South Korean girl group Itzy. Released by JYP Entertainment on February 12, 2019, the album includes the lead single "Dalla Dalla".

== Background and release ==
On January 24, 2019, JYP Entertainment shared the first teaser for Itzy's debut, followed by additional images the next day. In the following week, individual member teasers were unveiled. On February 1, the first teaser for the "Dalla Dalla" music video was uploaded to JYP Entertainment's YouTube channel. On February 5, more teaser images of the members were released. The next day, the tracklist for the single album was revealed, which included two songs: "Dalla Dalla" and "Want It?". On February 7, a voice teaser for "Dalla Dalla" was released, followed by a second music video teaser the next day. Finally, on February 12, Itzy officially debuted with the release of It'z Different and the music video for "Dalla Dalla".

== Promotion ==
Itzy began promoting It'z Different by performing "Dalla Dalla" for the first time during the live broadcast "The 1st Single Live Premiere" on Naver V Live. The group continued to promote the single album on South Korean music programs such as M Countdown, Show Champion, Show! Music Core, Music Bank, and Inkigayo where they earned nine music show wins for their debut song.

== Track listing ==
It'z Different track listing
No.	Title	Lyrics	Music	Arrangement	Length
1.	"Dalla Dalla" (달라달라; lit. Different Different)	Galactika	Galactika; Atenna	Galactika	3:19
2.	"Want It?"	Lee Seu-ran; Tommy Park	Emile Ghantous; Keith Hetrick; Allison Gillis; Aimee Proal; Whitney Phillips; Erin Beck	Emile Ghantous; Keith Hetrick	3:20
Total length:					6:39

== Charts ==
"Dalla Dalla"
Chart (2019)	Peak position
Japan (Japan Hot 100)	31
Malaysia (RIM)	8
New Zealand Hot Singles (RMNZ)	20
Singapore (RIAS)	3
South Korea (Gaon)	2
South Korea (K-pop Hot 100)	2
US World Digital Song Sales (Billboard)	2

== Release history ==
Release format for It'z Different
Region	Date	Format	Label	Ref.
South Korea	February 12, 2019	Digital download; streaming	JYP Entertainment	
Various	February 14, 2019	Digital download; streaming	JYP Entertainment	
