= It'z Icy =

2019 extended play by Itzy

- Digital and "ICY" version cover.

EP by Itzy
- Released: July 29, 2019
- Recorded: 2019
- Genre: K-pop
- Length: 16:18
- Languages: Korean; English
- Label: JYP

Itzy chronology
It'z Different (2019)	It'z Icy (2019)	It'z Me (2020)

Singles from It'z Icy
- 1. "Icy" Released: July 28, 2019

It'z Icy (stylized as IT'z ICY) is the first extended play (EP) by the South Korean girl group Itzy. It was released by JYP Entertainment on July 29, 2019, and includes the lead single "Icy".

== Background and release ==
On May 13, 2019, JYP Entertainment announced that Itzy was preparing for the release of a new record. On July 9, concept photos for the group's upcoming release were unveiled. From July 14 to 18, individual teasers for each member were released. On July 24 and 25, music video teasers for "Icy" were uploaded to JYP Entertainment's YouTube channel. On July 29, Itzy released It'z Icy, alongside a music video for its lead single. Two versions of the EP's physical release were made available, IT'z, and ICY.

== Music video ==
The music video for the title track accumulated 18.1 million views within 24 hours of its release. As of June 2025, it has over 270 million views on YouTube. On August 2, the dance practice video for "Icy" was uploaded to Itzy's YouTube channel.

== Charts performance ==
On August 5, It'z Icy debuted at number 11 on the US Billboard World Albums chart and number 19 on the Billboard Heatseekers Albums. In Japan, It'z Icy debuted at number 12 on Oricon Albums Chart, and 32 on the Japan Hot Albums chart. It'z Icy also entered at number 10 on Oricon Digital Albums chart.

== Track listing ==
It'z Icy track listing
No.	Title	Lyrics	Music	Arrangement	Length
1.	"Icy"	J.Y. Park "The Asiansoul"; Penomeco	J.Y. Park "The Asiansoul"; Cazzi Opeia; Ellen Berg Tollbom; Daniel Caesar; Ludwig Lindell; Ashley Alisha; Cameron Neilson; Lauren Dyson	J.Y. Park "The Asiansoul"; Lee Hae-seul	3:11
2.	"Cherry"	Ellie Suh (153/Joombas)	Michael Fonseca; Mac Montgomery; JAX; Dan Henig	Omega & Demn	3:10
3.	"It'z Summer"	JQ; Shin Sae-rom; Kako	Poptime; Kako	Poptime; Kako	3:18
4.	"Dalla Dalla" (DallasK Remix)	Galactika	Galactika; Athena	DallasK	3:11
5.	"Want It?" (Imad Royal Remix)	Lee Seu-ran; Tommy Park	Emile Ghantous; Keith Hetrick; Allison Gillis; Aimee Proal; Whitney Phillips; Erin Beck	Emile Ghantous; Keith Hetrick	3:28
Total length:					16:21

== Charts ==
Weekly sales chart performance for It'z Icy
Chart (2019)	Peak position
French Download Albums (SNEP)	49
Hungarian Albums (MAHASZ)	38
Japanese Albums (Oricon)	12
Japanese Digital Albums (Oricon)	10
Japan Hot Albums (Billboard Japan)	32
South Korean Albums (Gaon)	3
US Heatseekers Albums (Billboard)	19
US World Albums (Billboard)	11

Annual sales chart performance for It'z Icy
Chart (2019)	Position
South Korean Albums (Gaon)	47

== Accolades ==
Year-end lists
Critic/Publication	List	Song	Rank	Ref.
MTV	The Best K-pop B-sides of 2019	"Cherry"	15	

== Release history ==
Release formats for It'z Icy
Region	Date	Format	Label	Ref.
South Korea	July 29, 2019	CD	JYP Entertainment	
Various	July 29, 2019	Digital download; streaming	JYP Entertainment	
