= Collector (album) =

2025 studio album

- Standard edition cover

Studio album by Itzy
- Released: October 8, 2025
- Length: 30:41
- Language: Japanese
- Label: Warner Japan

Itzy chronology
Girls Will Be Girls (2025)	Collector (2025)	Tunnel Vision (2025)

Singles from Collector
- 1. "Rock & Roll" Released: October 8, 2025

Collector is the second Japanese-language studio album and third overall by South Korean girl group Itzy. It was released on October 8, 2025, by Warner Music Japan. The album features 10 tracks, including the lead single "Rock & Roll", and Japanese versions of the previously released singles "Imaginary Friend", "Girls Will Be Girls", and "Gold". It also features "Algorhythm" and "No Biggie" (2024) re-recorded as a quintet.

== Background and release ==
On August 22, 2025, it was announced that Itzy would release their second Japanese studio album, Collector, on October 8. The announcement was accompanied by a series of teaser images featuring the members in pastel-colored outfits, a concept also reflected in the album's digital cover. Collector was made available in eight different physical formats, each including a CD. Two limited edition versions were also released: one including a DVD and another featuring two sets of four-cut photo strips.

== Track listing ==
Collector track listing
No.	Title	Lyrics	Music	Arrangement	Length
1.	"Rock & Roll"	Park Sang-yu; Elvyn; Dainasaurs; Avenue 52; Scott Stoddart	Dainasaurs; Avenue 52	Scott Stoddart	3:05
2.	"I.I. Know Me"	Masami Kakinuma; Alawn; Andy Love; Carmen Reece	Alawn; Andy Love; Carmen Reece	Alawn	3:38
3.	"Out of Season"	Hiyori Nara; Esum; Stella Jones	Esum; Stella Jones	Esum	2:15
4.	"Trigger"	No2zcat; Youha; Dunk; Sutt; Mayu Wakisaka	No2zcat; Youha; Dunk; Sutt	No2zcat; Sutt	3:03
5.	"Wind Ride"	Hiyori Nara; Sqvare; JJean; Avenue 52; Rouno	Sqvare; JJean; Avenue 52; Rouno	Rouno	3:08
6.	"Algorhythm (Final version)"	Mayu Wakisaka; Josef Melin; Cecilia Kallin	Josef Melin; Cecilia Kallin	Josef Melin	3:07
7.	"No Biggie (Final version)"	Yui Kimura; Lara Andersson; Pontus Petersson; Anton Nessvi	Lara Andersson; Pontus Petersson; Anton Nessvi	Pontus Petersson; Anton Nessvi	3:00
8.	"Gold" (Japanese version)	Ryan Jhun; Seon; Y0ung (MUMW); Eeeee; Masami Kakinuma	Ryan Jhun; Dem Jointz; Jennifer Decilveo; 8AE; Bailey Flores; Stan Greene	Ryan Jhun; Dem Jointz	3:08
9.	"Imaginary Friend" (Japanese version)	Ryan Jhun; Sorana Pacurar; Masami Kakinuma; James Daniel Lewis	Ryan Jhun; James Daniel Lewis; Sorana Pacurar	Ryan Jhun; James Daniel Lewis; Jun Seo; Hwan Yang	3:24
10.	"Girls Will Be Girls" (Japanese version)	Jo In-ho (Lalala Studio); Gratia	Ryan Jhun; Jack Brady; Jordan Roman; David Charles Fischer; Kristin Carpenter	Ryan Jhun; The Wavys	2:49
Total length:					30:41

Collector Limited A bonus tracks (DVD)
No.	Title	Length
1.	"'Collector' Music Video Making Movie"
2.	"'Collector' Jacket Shooting Making Movie"

== Charts ==
Weekly chart performance for Collector
Chart (2025)	Peak position
Japanese Albums (Oricon)	3

== Release history ==
Release dates and formats for Collector
Region	Date	Format	Version	Label	Ref.
Japan	October 8, 2025	CD+DVD	Limited A	Warner Japan	
Japan	October 8, 2025	CD	Limited B	Warner Japan	
Japan	October 8, 2025	CD	Regular	Warner Japan	
Japan	October 8, 2025	CD	Yeji; Lia; Ryujin; Chaeryeong; Yuna	Warner Japan	
Various	October 8, 2025	Digital download; streaming	Regular	Warner Japan	
South Korea	October 8, 2025	Digital download; streaming	Regular	JYP	
