= Checkmate (EP) =

- Digital cover

EP by Itzy
- Released: July 15, 2022
- Length: 20:43
- Languages: Korean; English
- Labels: JYP; Republic

Itzy chronology
It'z Itzy (2021)	Checkmate (2022)	Cheshire (2022)

Singles from Checkmate
- 1. "Sneakers" Released: July 15, 2022

Alternative cover
- Original digital cover

Professional ratings
Review scores
Source	Rating
IZM	2/5 stars

Checkmate is the fifth extended play (EP) by South Korean girl group Itzy. It was released on July 15, 2022, through JYP Entertainment, and Republic Records. The EP consists of seven tracks, including the lead single "Sneakers".

Checkmate was a commercial success and debuted at number one on South Korea's Circle Album Chart with 700,000 copies sold in the first week of release, marking Itzy's fourth number-one album on the chart. In September, the EP became the group's first album to be certified Million by the Korea Music Content Association (KMCA) for surpassing 1,000,000 copies sold. It also debuted at number eight on the Billboard 200, becoming Itzy's first top-ten album in the United States.

== Background and release ==
On June 2, 2022, JYP Entertainment announced that Itzy would be returning with new music in July, which would be followed by their first world tour in support of the release. The announcement featured a promotion scheduler with details of the new EP as well as a partial schedule of the tour. The EP, Itzy's first new music in nine months since the release of their debut studio album Crazy in Love (2021), was announced to be entitled Checkmate with the lead single "Sneakers". On June 13, the group teaser photo was released. On July 11, a highlight medley teaser video for the album was released. The album alongside the music video for "Sneakers" were released on July 15.

== Album cover ==
The original digital cover for Checkmate featured a dark aura with a single chess piece in the middle. On July 22, 2022, JYP changed the album cover with no prior announcement, in response to fans complaints that the original cover did not match the group's concept or promotions.

== Accolades ==
Awards and nominations for Checkmate
Year	Organization	Award	Result	Ref.
2022	Asian Pop Music Awards	Top 20 Albums of the Year (Overseas)	Won	
2022	Asian Pop Music Awards	Best Album of the Year (Overseas)	Nominated	
2023	Golden Disc Awards	Best Album (Bonsang)	Nominated	
2023	Seoul Music Awards	Bonsang Award	Nominated	

== Commercial performance ==
On July 15, JYP Entertainment announced that Checkmate had reached 720,665 pre-orders as of July 14, surpassing Twice's Formula of Love: O+T=<3 to become the fourth-most pre-ordered album by a Korean girl group. On Hanteo Chart, the album recorded over 472,394 copies in its first week of release. In South Korea, Checkmate debuted at number one with 700,000 copies sold on the Circle Album Chart for the week ending July 16, 2022, becoming Itzy's fourth number-one album and surpassing Crazy in Love (2021) as the group's best-selling album. In the United States, Checkmate landed at number eight on the Billboard 200 with 33,000 equivalent album units, of which 31,000 units were album sales. This marked Itzy's first top-ten album and their highest position on the chart, surpassing the number 11 ranking of Crazy in Love. In August 31, it is reported that the album has exceeded 1,000,000 sales on the Circle Chart.

== Track listing ==
Checkmate track listing
No.	Title	Lyrics	Music	Arrangement	Length
1.	"Sneakers"	Friday (Galactica *); OGI (Galactica *); Didrik Thott; Jessica Pierpoint	D. Thott; Sebastian Thott; Pierpoint	S. Thott	2:59
2.	"Racer"	Noday; Iris Yerin Lee; Czaer	Czaer; Noday; Lee	Czaer	3:12
3.	"What I Want"	Saebom (Lalala Studio)	Greg Bonnick; Hayden Chapman; Karin Wilhemina Eurenius	LDN Noise; Wilhemina	2:23
4.	"Free Fall"	Song Hee-jin (Solcire); Kevin Oppa (Solcire)	Song; Kevin Oppa; Christoffer Semelius	Semelius	2:59
5.	"365"	Kenzie	Kenzie; Deez; Yunsu; Ylva Dimberg	Deez; Yunsu	3:05
6.	"Domino"	Hwang Eun-bit (PNP)	Christian Fast; Gusten Dahlqvist; Jonna Hall	Dahlqvist	3:06
7.	"Sneakers" (English version)	Friday; OGI; D. Thott; Pierpoint; Sophia Pae	D. Thott; S. Thott; Pierpoint	S. Thott	2:59
Total length:					20:43

Notes

- "Racer" is sometime stylized as "RAC3R".

== Charts ==
=== Weekly charts ===
Weekly chart performance
Chart (2022)	Peak position
Belgian Albums (Ultratop Flanders)	62
Belgian Albums (Ultratop Wallonia)	194
Croatian International Albums (HDU)	11
Finnish Albums (Suomen virallinen lista)	7
Hungarian Albums (MAHASZ)	24
Japanese Albums (Oricon)	10
Japanese Combined Albums (Oricon)	9
Japanese Hot Albums (Billboard Japan)	47
Polish Albums (ZPAV)	9
South Korean Albums (Circle)	1
Swedish Physical Albums (Sverigetopplistan)	12
UK Album Downloads (Official Charts)	79
US Billboard 200	8
US World Albums (Billboard)	1

=== Monthly charts ===
Monthly chart performance
Chart (2022)	Peak position
Japanese Albums (Oricon)	22
South Korean Albums (Circle)	5

=== Year-end charts ===
Year-end chart performance
Chart (2022)	Position
South Korean Albums (Circle)	18

== Certifications and sales ==
Certifications and sales
Region	Certification	Certified units/sales
South Korea (KMCA)	Million	1,032,930

== Release history ==
Release history
Region	Date	Format	Label	Ref.
Various	July 15, 2022	CD; digital download; streaming	JYP; Republic	
