= Voltage (song) =

- Digital cover

Single by Itzy

from the album Ringo
- Language: Japanese
- B-side: "Spice"
- Released: April 6, 2022
- Genre: J-pop; pop rock
- Length: 3:41
- Label: Warner Music Japan
- Composers: SELAH; Charlotte Wilson; Frankie Day; Ayushy; THE HUB 88
- Lyricist: Mayu Wakisaka

Itzy singles chronology
"Loco" (2021)	"Voltage" (2022)	"Sneakers" (2022)

Music video
- "Voltage" on YouTube

"Voltage" is a song by the South Korean girl group Itzy. It is the group's first Japanese maxi single. The song was released by Warner Music Japan on April 6, 2022.

== Composition ==
The single contains 4 tracks, including the title song 'Voltage' and the B-side 'Spice' with the instrumental versions of both songs. "Voltage" was written by Mayu Wakisaka who wrote some of Twice's hit songs such as Candy Pop and Knock Knock. It was described as pop-rock track that characterized by strong rap, Lyrically, it contains a message of that 'We will move forward confidently' by comparing the group's exhilarating energy to the song name 'Voltage'. It was composed in the key of F Minor, with a tempo of 107 beats per minute.

== Promotion ==
To promote "Voltage", Itzy performed the song at Venue 101.

== Commercial performance ==
Prior to the release of the official release, the music video was released on March 24, it helped the single to climb to the second place on Oricon daily single chart on April 5.

== Track listing ==
CD single / digital download
No.	Title	Lyrics	Music	Arrangement	Length
1.	"Voltage"	Mayu Wakisaka	SELAH; Charlotte Wilson; Frankie Day; Ayushy; THE HUB 88	SELAH	3:41
2.	"Spice"	D&H	Kobee; Holy M	Kobee; Holy M	3:10
3.	"Voltage (Instrumental)"		SELAH; Charlotte Wilson; Frankie Day; Ayushy; THE HUB 88	SELAH	3:41
4.	"Spice (Instrumental)"		Kobee; Holy M	Kobee; Holy M	3:10
Total length:					13:44

First press limited edition — DVD Type A only
No.	Title	Length
1.	"「Voltage」Jacket Shooting Making Movie"
2.	"Itzyメンバ-のQ&A"

== Credits and personnel ==
Credits adapted from Melon.

- Itzy – vocals
- Mayu Wakisaka – lyricist
- Charlotte Wilson – composer, arranger
- Frankie Day (THE HUB) – composer, arranger
- Ayushy – composer, arranger
- THE HUB 88 (THE HUB) – composer, arranger
- SELAH – composer, arranger

== Charts ==
=== Weekly charts ===
Weekly chart performance for "Voltage"
Chart (2022)	Peak position
Japan Hot 100 (Billboard)	16
Japan (Oricon)	3

=== Monthly charts ===
Monthly chart performance for "Voltage"
Chart (2022)	Position
Japan (Oricon)	9

=== Year-end charts ===
Year-end chart performance for "Voltage"
Chart (2022)	Position
Japan (Oricon)	99
Japan Top Singles Sales (Billboard Japan)	97

== Release history ==
Release formats for Voltage
Region	Date	Format	Label	Ref.
Japan	March 22, 2022	CD; DVD; digital download; streaming	Warner Music Japan	
Various	April 6, 2022	CD; digital download; streaming	Warner Music Japan	
