= Blah Blah Blah (Itzy song) =

- Digital cover

Single by Itzy

from the album Ringo
- Language: Japanese
- B-side: "Can't Tie Me Down"
- Released: October 5, 2022
- Genre: J-pop; synth-pop
- Length: 3:06
- Label: Warner Music Japan
- Composers: Sim Eunjee; Minyoung Lee (EastWest); Yeul (1by1)
- Lyricist: Mio Jorakuji

Itzy singles chronology
"Sneakers" (2022)	"Blah Blah Blah" (2022)	"Boys Like You" (2022)

"'Blah Blah Blah" is a song by South Korean girl group Itzy. It is the group's second Japanese maxi single. The song was released by Warner Music Japan on October 5, 2022.

== Composition ==
The release contains four tracks, including the title song "Blah Blah Blah" and the B-side "Can't tie me down" with the instrumental versions of the songs. The single "Blah Blah Blah" features a rhythmic rap and an "addictive" synth melody. Lyrically, it is about "moving forward confidently without being swayed by other people's words". "Blah Blah Blah" was composed in the key of E♭ Minor, with a tempo of 116 beats per minute.

== Promotion ==
On August 5, JYP Entertainment announced through their Japanese website that Itzy will hold their first offline special event in Japan exclusively for "Itzy Japan Official Shop!". To communicate with fans. To promote "Blah Blah Blah", Itzy performed the song on the Japanese television show Music Station.

== Track listing ==
CD single / digital download
No.	Title	Lyrics	Music	Arrangement	Length
1.	"Blah Blah Blah"	Mio Jorakuji	Sim Eunjee; Minyoung Lee (EastWest); Yeul (1by1)	Sim Eunjee; Minyoung Lee (EastWest); Yeul (1by1)	3:06
2.	"Can't Tie Me Down"	Yo-Hei	SELAH; Awry (THE HUB); Ayushy; THE HUB 88 (THE HUB)	SELAH	3:05
3.	"Blah Blah Blah (Instrumental)"		Sim Eunjee; Minyoung Lee (EastWest); Yeul (1by1)	Sim Eunjee; Minyoung Lee (EastWest); Yeul (1by1)	3:06
4.	"Can't Tie Me Down (Instrumental)"		SELAH; Awry (THE HUB); Ayushy; THE HUB 88 (THE HUB)	SELAH	3:04
Total length:					12:22

First press limited edition — DVD Type A only
No.	Title	Length
1.	""Blah Blah Blah" Music Video"
2.	"Blah Blah Blah" Music Video Making Movie"

First press limited edition — DVD Type B only
No.	Title	Length
1.	""Blah Blah Blah" Jacket Shooting Making Movie"
2.	""Blah Blah Blah" Music Video ITZY's VLOG"

== Charts ==
=== Weekly charts ===
Weekly chart performance for "Blah Blah Blah"
Chart (2022)	Peak position
Japan (Japan Hot 100)	11
Japan (Oricon)	3
Japan Combined Singles (Oricon)	4

=== Monthly charts ===
Monthly chart performance for "Blah Blah Blah"
Chart (2022)	Position
Japan (Oricon)	13

=== Year-end charts ===
Year-end chart performance for "Blah Blah Blah"
Chart (2022)	Position
Japan Top Singles Sales (Billboard Japan)	88

== Release history ==
Release formats for "Blah Blah Blah"
Region	Date	Format	Label	Ref.
Japan	September 20, 2022	CD; DVD; digital download; streaming	Warner Music Japan	
Various	October 5, 2022	CD; digital download; streaming	Warner Music Japan	
