= Girls Will Be Girls (EP) =

- Digital cover

EP by Itzy
- Released: June 9, 2025
- Length: 14:38
- Languages: Korean; English
- Labels: JYP; Republic

Itzy chronology
Gold (2024)	Girls Will Be Girls (2025)	Collector (2025)

Singles from Girls Will Be Girls
- 1. "Girls Will Be Girls" Released: June 9, 2025

Professional ratings
Review scores
Source	Rating
IZM	1.5/5 stars

Girls Will Be Girls is the tenth extended play (EP) by South Korean girl group Itzy. It was released by JYP Entertainment and Republic Records on June 9, 2025, and contains five tracks, including the lead single of the same name.

== Background and release ==
On May 12, 2025, JYP Entertainment announced, through the simultaneous release of a cinematic trailer and a promotional schedule, that Itzy would release a new record titled Girls Will Be Girls on June 9. On May 26, the track listing was revealed, confirming the record to be their tenth extended play, with the lead single of the same name. Over the next three days, concept photos for the EP were released. On June 2, a highlight medley previewing the tracks was released. Music video and visual teasers for the lead single were released on June 4 and 6. The EP was released on June 9, alongside the music video for its lead single.

== Track listing ==
Girls Will Be Girls track listing
No.	Title	Lyrics	Music	Arrangement	Length
1.	"Girls Will Be Girls"	Jo In-ho (Lalala Studio)	Ryan Jhun; Jack Brady; Jordan Roman; David Charles Fischer; Kristin Carpenter	Ryan Jhun; The Wavys	2:48
2.	"Kiss & Tell"	Seyeong (153/Joombas)	Maya Rose; Karin Wilhelmina Eurenius; Tobias Näslund	Tobias Näslund	2:46
3.	"Locked N Loaded"	Noday	Alex Karlsson; T-Ma; Arineh Karimi; Jono	Jono; T-Ma	2:25
4.	"Promise"	Lee Hyeong-seok	No2zcat; Une; Youha; Dunk	No2zcat	3:44
5.	"Walk"	Bang Hye-hyun	Winnie; Heggy	Winnie	2:55
Total length:					14:38

== Charts ==
=== Weekly charts ===
Weekly chart performance
Chart (2025)	Peak position
Belgian Albums (Ultratop Flanders)	162
Croatian International Albums (HDU)	22
Finnish Physical Albums (Suomen virallinen lista)	7
Greek Albums (IFPI)	5
Japanese Albums (Oricon)	20
Japanese Combined Albums (Oricon)	28
Japanese Download Albums (Billboard Japan)	7
South Korean Albums (Circle)	2
UK Album Downloads (Official Charts)	80
US Top Album Sales (Billboard)	10
US World Albums (Billboard)	4

=== Monthly charts ===
Monthly chart performance
Chart (2025)	Position
Japanese Albums (Oricon)	39
South Korean Albums (Circle)	4

=== Year-end charts ===
Year-end chart performance
Chart (2025)	Position
South Korean Albums (Circle)	55

== Certifications ==
Certifications
Region	Certification	Certified units/sales
South Korea (KMCA)	Platinum	250,000^{^}
^{^} Shipments figures based on certification alone.

== Release history ==
Release history
Region	Date	Format	Label
Various	June 9, 2025	Digital download; streaming	JYP; Republic
South Korea	June 9, 2025	CD; cassette tape	JYP; Republic
United States; Europe	June 13, 2025	CD	JYP; Republic
