= Icy (Itzy song) =

2019 single by Itzy

Single by Itzy

from the EP It'z Icy
- Released: July 29, 2019
- Recorded: 2019
- Genre: K-pop
- Length: 3:11
- Label: JYP
- Composers: J.Y. Park "The Asiansoul"; Cazzi Opeia; Ellen Berg; Daniel Caesar; Ludwig Lindell; Ashley Alisha; Lauren Dyson
- Lyricists: J.Y. Park; Penomeco
- Producers: J.Y. Park; Lee Hae-sol

Itzy singles chronology
"Dalla Dalla" (2019)	"Icy" (2019)	"Wannabe" (2020)

Music video
- "Icy" on YouTube

"Icy" is a song by South Korean girl group Itzy from their debut EP, titled It'z Icy. It was released by JYP Entertainment as the lead single on July 29, 2019. An English-language version of "Icy" was included on Itzy's first English EP Not Shy (English Ver.), while a Japanese-language version was included on their first compilation album It'z Itzy with lyrics written by D&H.

Commercially, the song peaked at number ten on the Gaon Digital Chart, earning Itzy their second top-ten hit after "Dalla Dalla". It also topped the Billboard K-pop Hot 100, their first number-one song on the chart. Following the release of It'z Icy, Itzy promoted the song with live performances on several South Korean music television programs and amassed twelve music show trophies.

== Composition ==
"Icy" was written by J. Y. Park and Penomeco. The song is written in the key D major and has a tempo of 125 beats per minute. It has been described as a "fiery and energetic summer song that promotes the quintet's passions about music." In a showcase, Itzy described the song as an extension of the group's first record, "Dalla Dalla," sharing similar meanings but having a more festive and upbeat air. The pre-chorus lyrics, consisting of lines such as "Icy but I'm on fire" and "Look at me, I'm not a liar," serves as the lead-up to the dynamic chorus of the song, and according to Billboard's Tamar Herman, "may as well be the girl group's anthem."

== Critical reception ==
Professional ratings
Review scores
Source	Rating
IZM	3/5 stars

Pop Crush included "Icy" in their best songs of 2019 list, writing that "it's a song that should sound overwhelming in theory, but instead is balanced perfectly with strong vocals, creating an effervescent dance track that empowers listeners to be confident and believe in themselves."

== Music video ==
The music video for the title track was released at midnight of the same day and accumulated 18.1 million views within 24 hours. The music video was ranked at No. 7 on 2019 YouTube's Most Popular Music Video in South Korea, the group's second song to enter the list, with "Dalla Dalla" ranked in second place. As of November 2023, it has over 263 million views and 3.7 million likes on YouTube. The music video for "Icy" was filmed in Los Angeles.

== Accolades ==
Year-end lists
Critic/Publication	List	Rank	Ref.
YouTube	Top 10 Most-Watched MVs of 2019 Within Korea	7	

Awards
Year	Award	Category	Result	Ref.
2020	9th Gaon Chart Music Awards	Artist of the Year – Digital Music (July)	Nominated	

Music program wins
Program	Date (12 total)	Ref.
Show Champion (MBC M)	August 7, 2019	
Show Champion (MBC M)	August 14, 2019	
Show Champion (MBC M)	August 21, 2019	
M Countdown (Mnet)	August 8, 2019	
M Countdown (Mnet)	August 22, 2019	
Show! Music Core (MBC)	August 10, 2019	
Show! Music Core (MBC)	August 17, 2019	
Show! Music Core (MBC)	August 24, 2019	
Inkigayo (SBS)	August 11, 2019	
Inkigayo (SBS)	August 25, 2019	
Music Bank (KBS)	August 16, 2019	
Music Bank (KBS)	August 23, 2019	

== Commercial performance ==
"Icy" debuted at No. 11 of the Gaon Digital Chart, later peaking at No. 10 the second week, giving the group their second top ten song. It also peaked at number 1 and 7 on the Billboard K-pop Hot 100 and World Digital Song Sales charts, respectively.

== Charts ==
=== Weekly charts ===
Chart (2019)	Peak position
Japan (Japan Hot 100)	34
Singapore (RIAS)	11
South Korea (Gaon)	10
South Korea (K-pop Hot 100)	1
US World Digital Song Sales (Billboard)	7

=== Monthly charts ===
Chart (2019)	Position
South Korea (Gaon)	12

=== Year-end charts ===
Chart (2019)	Position
South Korea (Gaon)	99

== Certifications ==
Region	Certification	Certified units/sales
Streaming
Japan (RIAJ)	Silver	30,000,000^{†}
^{†} Streaming-only figures based on certification alone.

== Release history ==
Region	Date	Format	Label	Ref.
Various	July 29, 2019	Digital download, streaming	JYP Entertainment	

== See also ==
- List of K-pop Hot 100 number ones
- List of M Countdown Chart winners (2019)
