= It'z Me =

- Digital cover

EP by Itzy
- Released: March 9, 2020
- Recorded: 2019–2020
- Studio: JYPE Studios
- Genres: K-pop; dance; hip hop; rock
- Length: 21:27
- Languages: Korean; English
- Label: JYP

Itzy chronology
| It'z Icy (2019) | It'z Me (2020) | Not Shy (2020) |

Singles from It'z Me
- 1. "Wannabe" Released: March 9, 2020

It'z Me (stylized as IT'z ME) is the second extended play (EP) by South Korean girl group Itzy, released by JYP Entertainment on March 9, 2020. The EP features seven tracks, including the lead single "Wannabe", with productions from Galactika, Oak Felder, Oliver Heldens, earattack, Shim Eunji, Collapsedone, Jin by Jin, Sophie, and KASS.

The EP received positive reviews, with critics praising the group's evolving sound and empowering themes of self-confidence. Upon its release, It'z Me debuted at number one on the Gaon Album Chart, number five on the US Billboard World Albums chart, and sold over 126,000 units in its first month.

== Background and release ==
"Itzy finished filming the music video for their comeback ahead of their showcase tour in the United States. The exact timing of their comeback is undecided."

— JYP Entertainment shared to Xportsnews.

On January 28, 2020, JYP Entertainment announced that Itzy would release a new record in the spring. Teaser images for the group were unveiled from February 18 to 20, followed by individual member teasers released from February 23 to 27. The album's track listing was revealed on March 1. Music video teasers for the title track "Wannabe" were released on March 4 and 5.

On March 9, Itzy released their EP It'z Me, along with the music video for its lead single. Three physical versions of the EP were released: IT'z, ME, and WANNABE.

== Music and composition ==
It'z Me is a K-pop record that combines dance, hip hop, and rock. Its lead single "Wannabe" is a dance-pop track with house elements and was written and produced by Galactika.

Other tracks on the EP explore a variety of styles: “Ting Ting Ting” is an energetic EDM track; "That's a No No" incorporates Latin pop; "Nobody Like You" features upbeat pop rock; "You Make Me" blends pop with electronic and trap influences; "I Don't Wanna Dance" combines house and moombahton; and "24Hrs" is a hyperpop track described as a "quirky-pop stomper", notable as the only K-pop song produced by Sophie.

=== Live performances ===
On March 12, 2020, Itzy made their debut performance of "Wannabe" on M Countdown. From March 13 to April 4, the group performed the song on Music Bank, Show! Music Core, and Inkigayo.

== Critical reception ==
Professional ratings
Review scores
| Source | Rating |
|---|---|
| IZM | 2/5 stars |
| Billboard | favorable |

Billboard's Jeff Benjamin gave the EP a positive review, noting that Itzy continues their string of empowering and confident singles, with It'z Me featuring a harder, more electronic sound than their previous releases.

IZM's Kim Do-heon highlighted the message in the chorus of "Wannabe", where the group shouts "I don't wanna be somebody / Just wanna be me". They added that, while the song encourages individuality, the harmony in the group's voices evokes the idea of a collective wannabe.

== Commercial performance ==
"Wannabe" debuted at number six on the Gaon Digital Chart, marking Itzy's third top-ten hit. The song also debuted at number four on the US Billboard World Digital Song Sales chart, becoming the group's first top-five entry since "Dalla Dalla" and their third top-ten entry overall. In New Zealand, the song peaked at number 22 on the Hot Singles chart. While in Japan, it debuted at number 23. The group became the fifth K-pop female act to chart on the Canadian Hot 100, debuting at number 92. The song topped the charts in Malaysia and Singapore, becoming their first number-one hit on both charts.

On March 21, It'z Me debuted at number five on the US Billboard World Albums chart. According to Hanteo, the EP sold over 34,000 physical copies on its first day of release, selling double the amount as It'z Icy. The EP also debuted at number one on the Gaon Weekly Album Chart, marking their first number-one album in South Korea. It also debuted at number 27 in Poland, making it their first appearance on a European chart.

In February 2026, the B-side track "That's a No No" gained renewed attention following a series of live performances, with short-form videos surpassing 40 million views across various platforms. The track also climbed on the Melon daily chart, from number 961 to number 307 within a week.

=== Music video ===
The music video for the title track accumulated over 11 million views within 24 hours of its release. By April 2020, it had surpassed over 100 million views on Youtube, and as of July 2025, it has over 560 million views.

== Track listing ==
It'z Me track listing
| No. | Title | Lyrics | Music | Arrangement | Length |
|---|---|---|---|---|---|
| 1. | "Wannabe" | Galactika | Galactika | Team Galactika | 3:12 |
| 2. | "Ting Ting Ting" | Penomeco; Lee Seu-ran; Kang Eun-jeong | Warren "Oak" Felder; Janee "Jin Jin" Bennett; Oliver Heldens | Oak Felder; Oliver Heldens | 3:39 |
| 3. | "That's a No No" | Shim Eunji; Kass | Shim Eunji; Kass; Ariowa Irosogie | Shim Eunji; Kass | 3:00 |
| 4. | "Nobody Like You" | Yubin; Josh Record; Andrew Bullimore | Lee Woo-min "collapsedone"; Josh Record; Andrew Bullimore | Lee Woo-min "collapsedone" | 3:17 |
| 5. | "You Make Me" | Lee Seu-ran; Earattack; Miranda Glory Inzunza | Earattack; Miranda Glory Inzunza; Matthew Ferree | Earattack; Gong-do | 3:03 |
| 6. | "I Don't Wanna Dance" | JQ (MUMW); Jeong Se-hee (MUMW) | Anne Judith Stokke Wik; Nermin Harambašić; JinbyJin; Seung-eun Oh; Andreas Baertels | JinbyJin | 3:09 |
| 7. | "24Hrs" | Penomeco | Sophie; Lola Blanc | Sophie | 2:07 |
| Total length: | | | | | 21:27 |

== Charts ==
Weekly sales chart performance for It'z Me
| Chart (2020) | Peak position |
|---|---|
| Japanese Albums (Oricon) | 13 |
| Japanese Hot Albums (Billboard Japan) | 37 |
| Polish Albums (ZPAV) | 27 |
| South Korean Albums (Gaon) | 1 |
| UK Album Downloads (Official Charts) | 98 |
| US World Albums (Billboard) | 5 |

Monthly sales chart performance for It'z Me
| Chart (2020) | Peak position |
|---|---|
| South Korea (Gaon Album Chart) | 4 |

== Certifications and sales figures ==
Sales certifications and figures for It'z Me
| Region | Certification | Certified units/sales |
|---|---|---|
| Japan | — | 10,386 |
| South Korea | — | 198,251 |
| United States | — | 2,000 |

== Release history ==
Release formats for It'z Me
| Region | Date | Format | Label | Ref. |
|---|---|---|---|---|
| South Korea | March 9, 2020 | CD; digital download; streaming | JYP Entertainment | |
| Various | March 9, 2020 | Digital download, streaming | JYP Entertainment | |

== See also ==
- List of Gaon Album Chart number ones of 2020
- List of K-pop songs on the Billboard charts
- List of K-pop albums on the Billboard charts
- List of number-one songs of 2020 (Malaysia)
- List of number-one songs of 2020 (Singapore)
