= Fast Forward (song) =

Single by Jeon Somi

from the EP Game Plan
- Language: Korean; English
- Released: August 7, 2023
- Genre: Deep house
- Length: 2:40
- Label: The Black Label; Interscope
- Composers: Teddy; Vince; R.Tee; Bekuh Boom
- Lyricists: Teddy; Jeon Somi; Bekuh Boom; Vince

Jeon Somi singles chronology
"XOXO" (2021)	"Fast Forward" (2023)	"Ex-Mas" (2023)

Music video
- "Fast Forward" on YouTube

"Fast Forward" is a song recorded by South Korean and Canadian singer-songwriter Jeon Somi. It was released by The Black Label and Interscope Records on August 7, 2023, as the lead single from the singer's first extended play, Game Plan. It was composed by Teddy, Vince, R.Tee, and Bekuh Boom, and Jeon Somi participated in writing the lyrics along with Teddy, Bekuh Boom, and Vince.

Domestically, the song was a commercial success, peaking at number five on the Circle Digital Chart and on the Billboard's South Korea Songs, respectively, making it the singer's highest charting song on said charts. It also managed to chart in New Zealand, the US, and Singapore.

== Background ==
In October 2021, Somi's released her first studio album, XOXO, along with its title track of the same name. Prior to that, Somi's released the pre-release single "Dumb Dumb," which became her first top-ten hit on both the Circle Digital Chart and the Kpop Hot 100 at the time. The singer later released a music video for the track "Anymore" as a fan gift . On June 2, 2023, an official spokesperson from the artist's parent agency, The Black Label, confirmed to the South Korean media outlet Star News that Somi is preparing for her comeback. On July 24, her agency posted a "profile image" on Somi's official SNS, announcing the EP's release date, August 7, alongside its title track.

== Composition ==
"Fast Forward" was written by Somi alongside Teddy, Bekuh Boom, and Vince, and composed by Teddy, Vince, R.Tee, and Bekuh Boom. It is a deep house song that "coolly colors the summer with refreshing instruments," characterized by an "uplifting" pre-chorus and energetic hook. Lyrically, it is a song "that captures the desire to meet a true love". "Fast Forward"'s hook samples the introductory vocal of "Chained to the Rhythm", a 2017 track by Katy Perry.

== Critical reception ==
Business Insider ranked it number 9 in their list of The best K-pop songs of 2023 while Dazed placed it at 21 in their list of Top 50 best K-pop tracks of 2023.

== Accolades ==
Award and nominations for "Fast Forward"
Year	Organization	Award	Result	Ref.
2023	The Fact Music Awards	Best Music – Fall	Nominated	
2023	MAMA Awards	Best Dance Performance – Female Solo	Nominated	
2023	MAMA Awards	Song of the Year	Longlisted	

== Credits and personnel ==
Song credits

- Somi – vocals, creative director, lyricist
- Teddy – lyricist, composition, arrangement
- Bekuh Boom – lyricist, composition
- Vince – lyricist, composition, arrangement
- R.Tee – composition, arrangement
- Young Ju Bang – recording engineer
- Yung Dungeon – recording engineer
- Josh Gudwin – mixing engineer
- Chris Gehringer – mastering engineer

Visual credits

- Han Sa-min – music video director
- Jeawook Lee – choreographer director
- Sadeck Waff – choreography, choreographer director
- BabyZoo – choreography, choreographer director,
- Aya Sato – choreography
- Kiel Tutin – choreography

== Charts ==
=== Weekly charts ===
Weekly chart performance for "Fast Forward"
Chart (2023)	Peak positions
Global 200 (Billboard)	145
Japan Heatseekers (Billboard)	3
New Zealand Hot Singles (RMNZ)	24
Singapore (RIAS)	24
South Korea (Circle)	5
US World Digital Song Sales (Billboard)	10
Vietnam (Vietnam Hot 100)	43

=== Monthly charts ===
Monthly chart performance for "Fast Forward"
Chart (2023)	Position
South Korea (Circle)	7

=== Year-end charts ===
2023 year-end chart performance for "Fast Forward"
Chart (2023)	Position
South Korea (Circle)	67

2024 year-end chart performance for "Fast Forward"
Chart (2024)	Position
South Korea (Circle)	138

== Certifications ==
Certifications for "Fast Forward"
Region	Certification	Certified units/sales
Brazil (Pro-Música Brasil)	Gold	20,000^{‡}
^{‡} Sales+streaming figures based on certification alone.

== Release history ==
Release dates and formats for "Fast Forward"
Region	Date	Format	Label	Ref.
Various	August 7, 2023	Digital download; streaming	The Black Label; Interscope	
