= List of M Countdown Chart winners (2020) =

Winners of South Korean music program M Countdown

M Countdown Chart winners (2020)

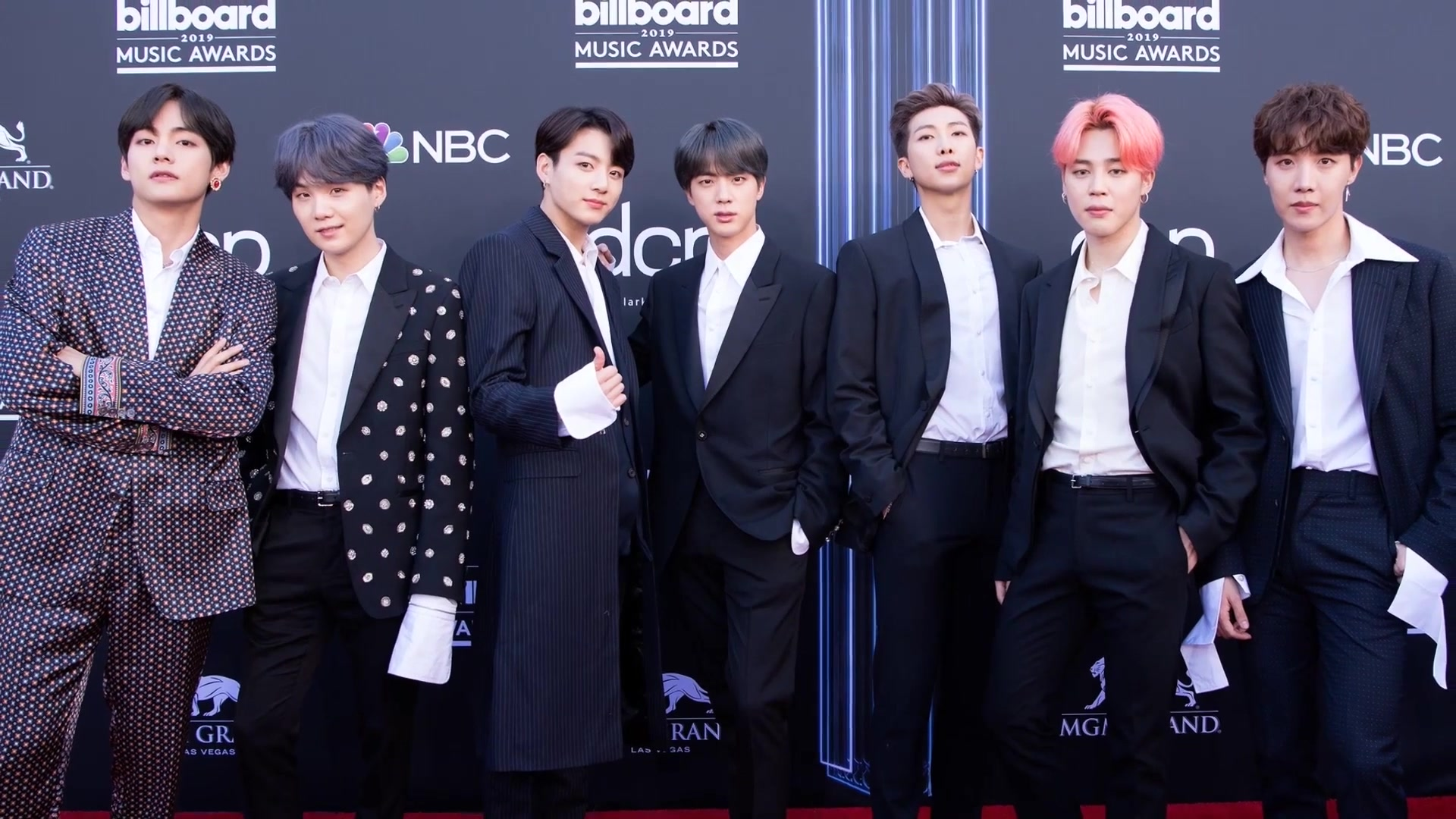
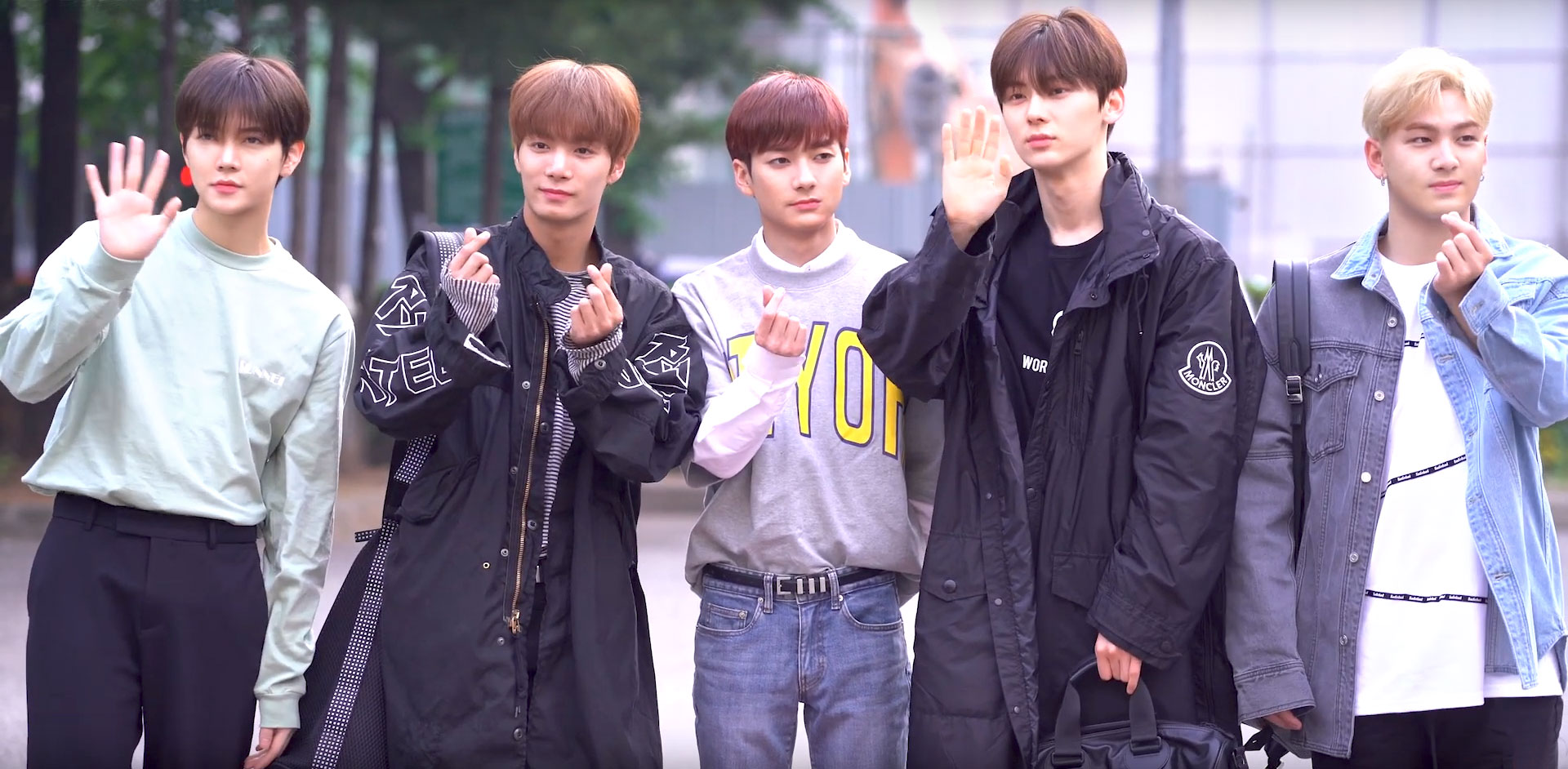
"On" by BTS (top) and "I'm in Trouble" by NU'EST (bottom) earned the only perfect scores of the year.

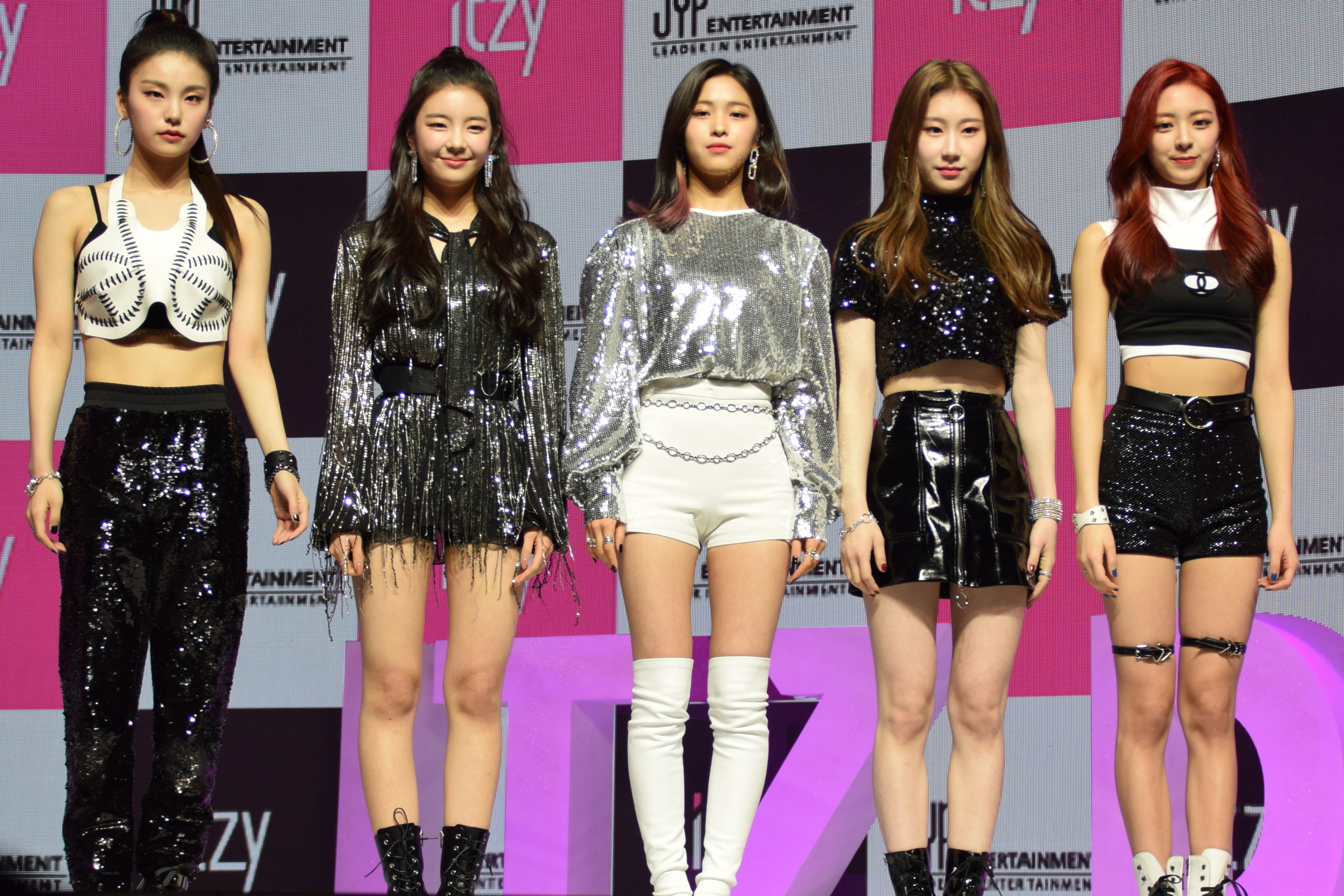
Itzy achieved their first M Countdown triple crown in 2020 and were the only artist to do so twice for the year, with their songs "Wannabe" and "Not Shy".

The M Countdown Chart is a record chart on the South Korean Mnet television music program M Countdown. Every week, the show awards the best-performing single on the chart in the country during its live broadcast.

In 2020, 33 singles ranked number one on the chart and 25 music acts received first-place trophies. Two songs collected trophies for three weeks and achieved a triple crown: "Wannabe" and "Not Shy", both by Itzy. Of all releases for the year, only two songs earned a perfect score of 11,000 points: "On" by BTS and "I'm in Trouble" by NU'EST.

== Scoring system ==
=== April 26, 2018 – May 21, 2020 ===
Scoring System: Digital Music Sales (45%), Album Sales (15%), Social Media Score (YouTube official music video views + SNS buzz) (20%), Global Fan Votes (10%), Mnet Broadcast Score (10%), SMS Live Vote 10%.

=== May 28, 2020 – present ===
Scoring System: Digital Sales (Melon, Genie, FLO) (45%), Album Sales (15%), Social Media (YouTube MV views) (15%), Global Fan Vote (15%), Mnet Broadcast (Mnet TV, MCD Stage, M2 Contents) (10%), Live Vote (for 1st nominees only) (10%).

== Chart history ==
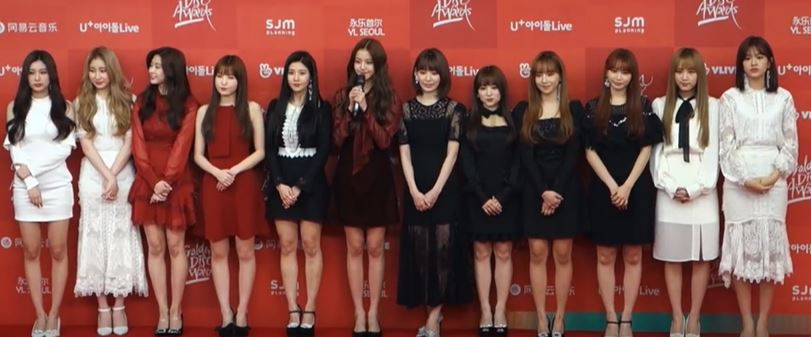
Iz*One achieved three number one singles on M Countdown: "Fiesta", "Secret Story of the Swan", and "Panorama", the most of any act in 2020.

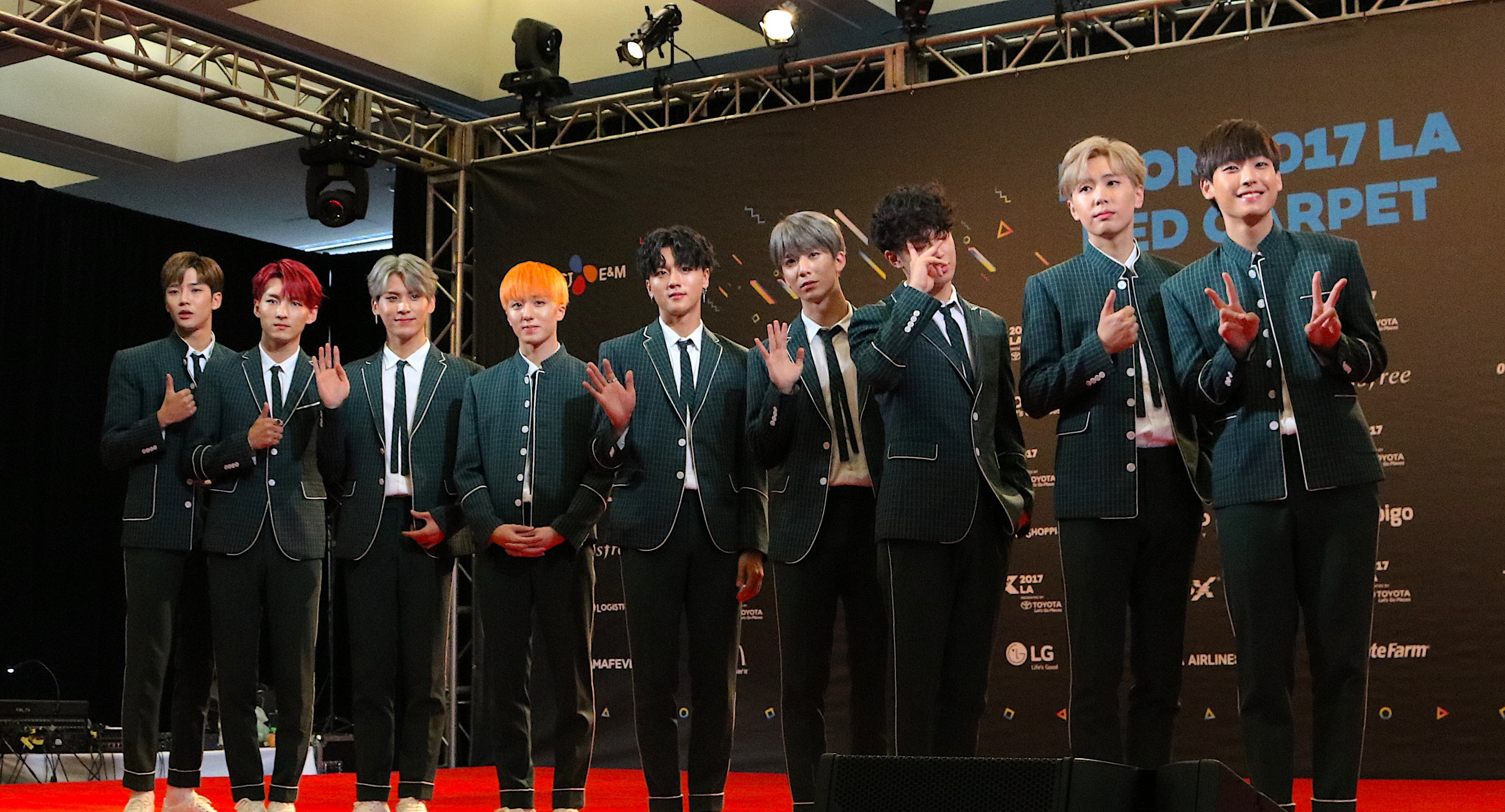
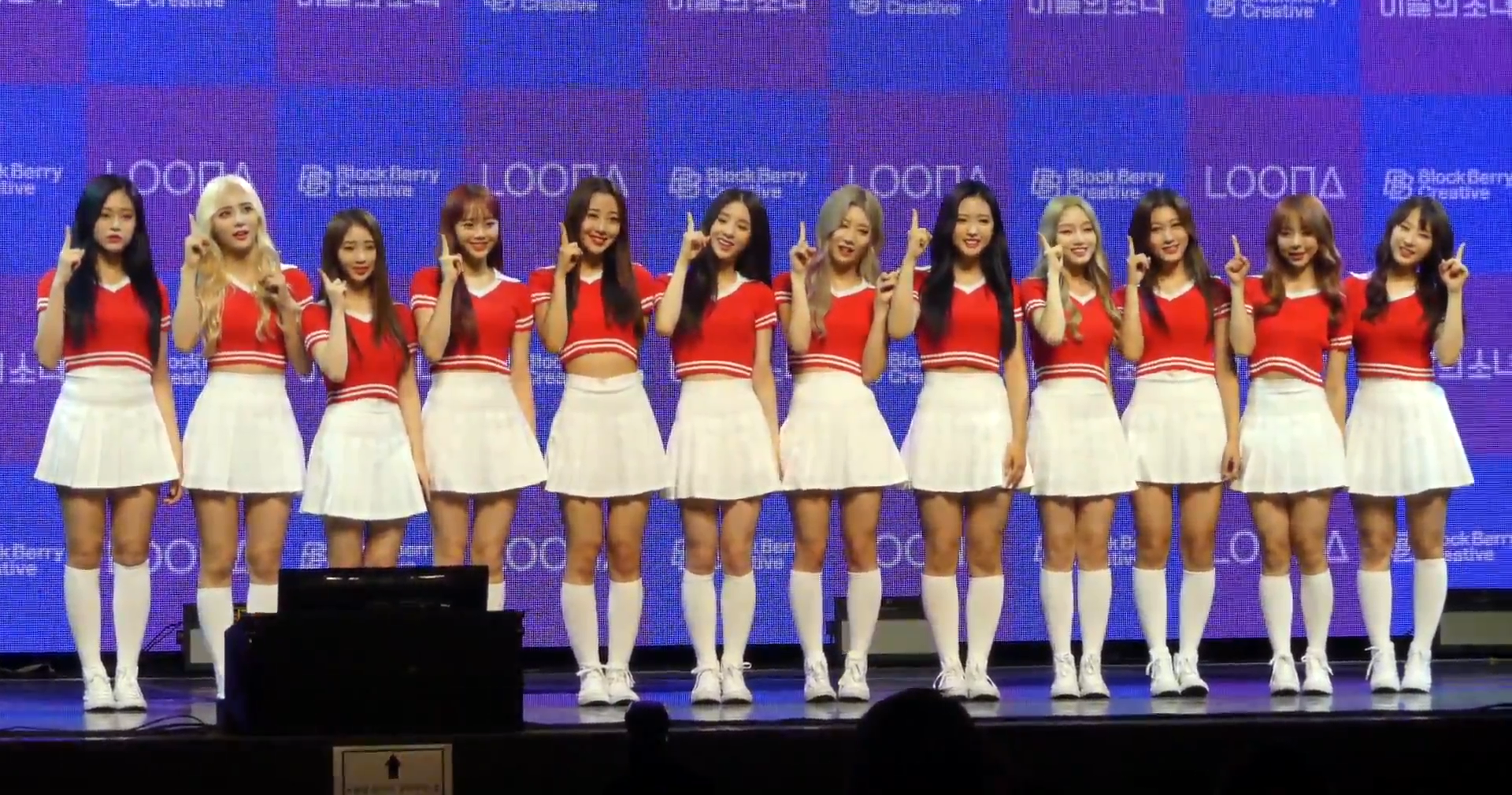
SF9 (top) and Loona (bottom) won their first-ever music show trophy on M Countdown for "Good Guy" and "So What" respectively.

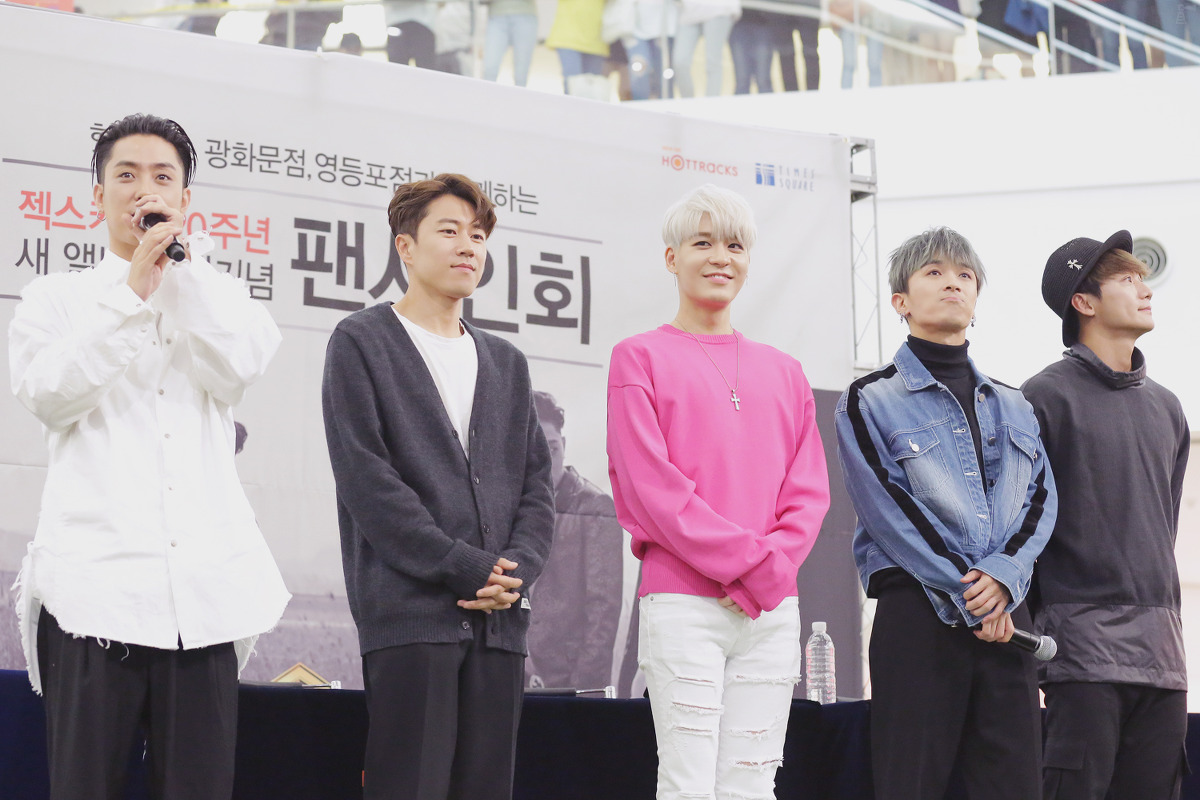
Sechs Kies won their first M Countdown trophy with "All for You".

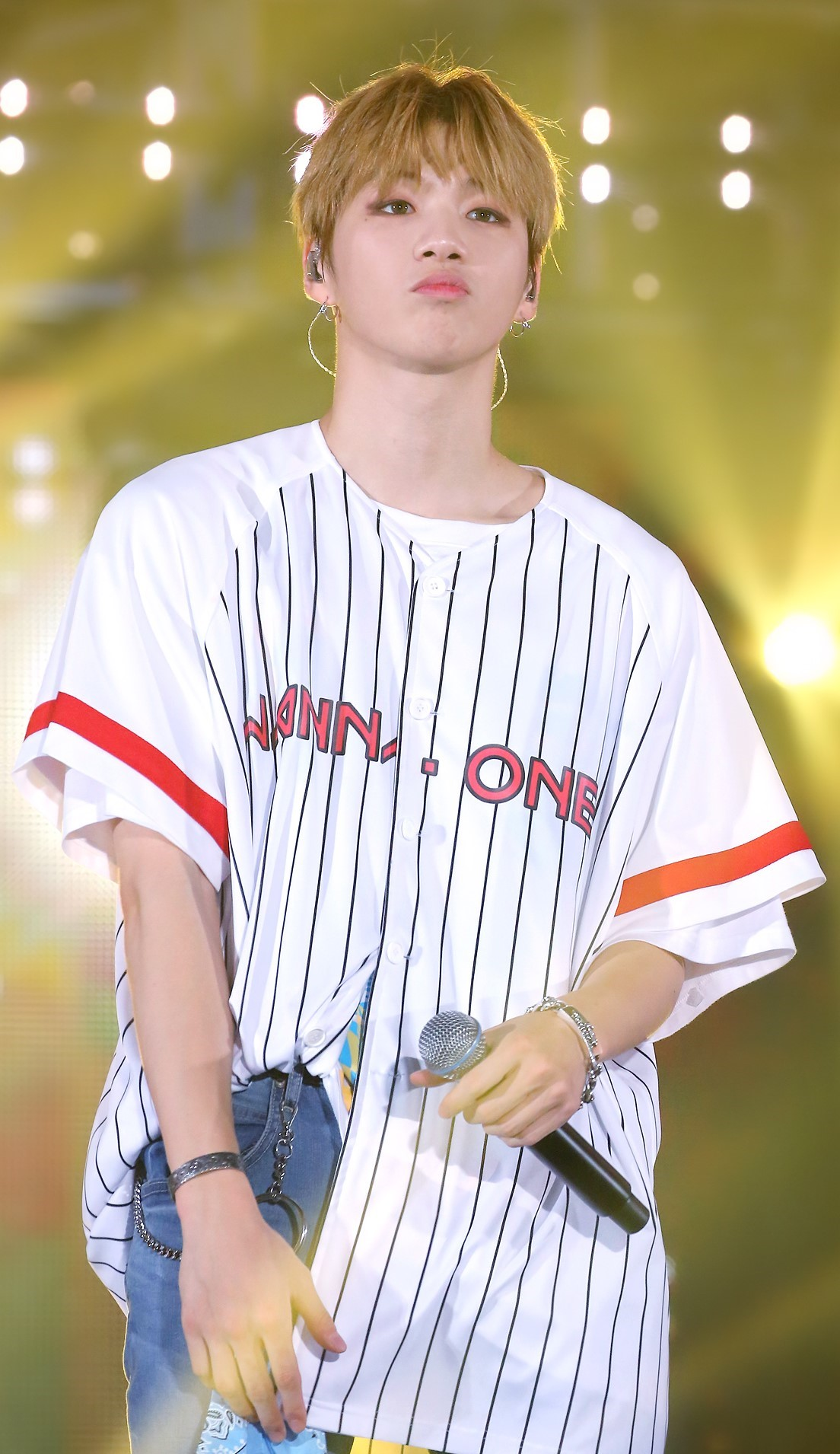
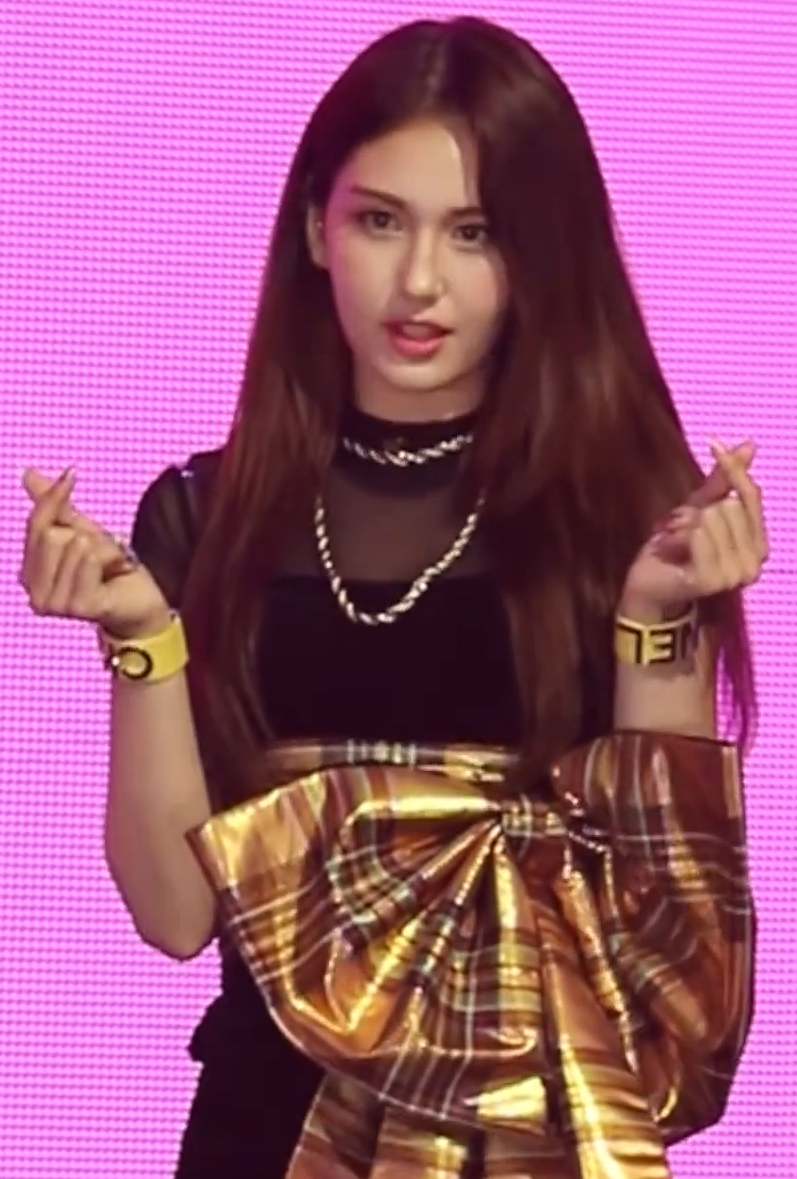
Kang Daniel (left) won his first M Countdown trophy as a soloist with "2U". Somi (right) achieved her first-ever music show win as a soloist with "What You Waiting For".

Key
	Triple Crown
	Highest score of the year
—	No show was held

Episode	Date	Artist	Song	Points	Ref.
647	January 2	New Year's Special – No Winner			
648	January 9	Momoland	"Thumbs Up"	10,125	
649	January 16	SF9	"Good Guy"	9,798	
—N/a	January 23	No Broadcast or Winner			
650	January 30	SF9	"Good Guy"	10,031	
651	February 6	Sechs Kies	"All for You"	9,213	
652	February 13	GFriend	"Crossroads"	9,461	
653	February 20	GFriend	"Crossroads"	7,492	
654	February 27	Iz*One	"Fiesta"	10,914	
655	March 5	BTS	"On"	11,000	
656	March 12	Loona	"So What"	8,075	
657	March 19	Itzy	"Wannabe"	N/A	
658	March 26	Itzy	"Wannabe"	7,902	
659	April 2	Itzy	"Wannabe"	N/A	
660	April 9	Kang Daniel	"2U"	7,664	
661	April 16	(G)I-dle	"Oh My God"	N/A	
662	April 23	Apink	"Dumhdurum"	8,628	
663	April 30	Got7	"Not By The Moon"	7,830	
664	May 7	Oh My Girl	"Nonstop"	N/A	
665	May 14	Oh My Girl	"Nonstop"	6,580	
666	May 21	NU'EST	"I'm in Trouble"	11,000	
667	May 28	NCT 127	"Punch"	9,778	
668	June 4	NCT 127	"Punch"	7,414	
669	June 11	Twice	"More & More"	9,356	
670	June 18	Cosmic Girls	"Butterfly"	9,235	
671	June 25	Iz*One	"Secret Story of the Swan"	N/A	
672	July 2	Seventeen	"Left & Right"	10,705	
673	July 9	Blackpink	"How You Like That"	8,167	
674	July 16	Blackpink	"How You Like That"	7,432	
675	July 23	GFriend	"Apple"	8,536	
676	July 30	SSAK3	"Beach Again"	6,420	
677	August 6	Somi	"What You Waiting For"	6,776	
678	August 13	(G)I-dle	"Dumdi Dumdi"	8,842	
679	August 20	(G)I-dle	"Dumdi Dumdi"	8,521	
—	August 27	No Broadcast or Winner			
680	September 3	Itzy	"Not Shy"	6,838	
681	September 10	Itzy	"Not Shy"	6,866	
682	September 17	Itzy	"Not Shy"	7,443	
683	September 24	Stray Kids	"Back Door"	7,086	
684	October 1	The Boyz	"The Stealer"	N/A	
685	October 8	The Boyz	"The Stealer"	5,432	
686	October 15	Blackpink	"Lovesick Girls"	8,691	
687	October 22	NCT U	"Make A Wish (Birthday Song)"	7,552	
688	October 29	Seventeen	"Home;Run"	7,724	
689	November 5	Twice	"I Can't Stop Me"	9,065	
690	November 12	Twice	"I Can't Stop Me"	—N/a	
691	November 19	Mamamoo	"Aya"	—N/a	
—	November 26	No Broadcast or Winner			
—	December 3	No Broadcast or Winner			
—	December 10	No Broadcast or Winner			
692	December 17	Iz*One	"Panorama"	9,364	
693	December 24	Iz*One	"Panorama"	—N/a	
—	December 31	No Broadcast or Winner			
"—" denotes an episode did not air that week.
