= What You Waiting For (Jeon Somi song) =

2020 single by Somi

Single by Jeon Somi

from the album XOXO
- Language: Korean
- Released: July 22, 2020
- Recorded: February 2020
- Genre: R&B; dance-pop; synth-pop; electronica; power-pop
- Length: 2:55
- Label: The Black Label; Interscope
- Composers: Teddy Park; R. Tee; 24; Somi
- Lyricists: Teddy; Somi; Danny Chung
- Producers: Teddy; R. Tee; 24

Jeon Somi singles chronology
"Birthday" (2019)	"What You Waiting For" (2020)	"Dumb Dumb" (2021)

Music video
- "What You Waiting For" on YouTube

"What You Waiting For" is a song released by South Korean and Canadian singer-songwriter Jeon Somi. It was released by The Black Label and Interscope Records on July 22, 2020.

== Background and release ==
On July 14, 2020, The Black Label released a promotional poster for the song with the release date on it, confirming that Somi would make a surprise comeback in about a week. Then, on July 15, they released the second promotional poster, also unveiling the title of the song "What You Waiting For". The following day, a credits poster was unveiled revealing that Somi was involved in the songs's writing and production as well. On July 18, the third promotional poster was released. On July 22, the song and its music video were released for digital download and streaming.

== Composition ==
"What You Waiting For" was written by Teddy, R.Tee, 24, Jeon Somi, Danny Chung and produced by Teddy, R. Tee, 24 The final version was fully recorded at The Black Label in Seoul, South Korea in February 2020, five months before the release, on July 22 of the same year. It is an upbeat R&B, dance-pop, synth-pop, electronica and power-pop track that incorporate elements of trop-house, EDM-pop, moombahton and 2010s house beats. The track built around an "emotional" chord progression that contrasts with "the bright" synth sound, which is considered different from somi's previous songs. The track "opens with a subtle synth-pop production, bouncing through DIY-vibe electronica and a racing, power-pop chorus as Somi tells an apprehensive lover 'Baby, I’ve been waiting for you all this time!". In the lyrics, somi narrates a story about a girl who is waiting for a confession from her crush, where she asks him "a bold question", which is, "What you waiting for?". In an interview, Somi claimed the song had no specific inspiration, adding that it might have been "the late night tacos and chicken wings" she and her producers had been waiting for.

== Music video ==
On July 17, the first music video teaser was released. Three days later, the second music video teaser was released. A day after, the third music video teaser was released. On July 22, the music video was released. The video amassed over six million views in its first 24 hours of release. By November 2020, the music video had gathered more than 18 million views.

As quoted from Forbes, "The video showed Somi who looked more confident than ever embracing different looks and sides of herself as she literally breaks through barriers." In an interview with "Idol Radio," Somi explained that she played 'sub-characters' in her music video. She explained, "This time, I played 8 roles per person. Looking at the timid Somi trapped in the frame she made, the strong Somi continues to tell her to go out and express herself and be confident". "At the end, as the timid Somi and the strong Somi combine, a new Somi with a sword in her head was born."

== Commercial performance ==
The song peaked at number 53 on the South Korean Gaon chart becoming Somi's third highest entry on the chart. In Malaysia the song peaked at number 8 becoming her first top ten hit in the country. In Singapore the song hit number two becoming her highest-charting song there. The song also peaked at number 8 on the Billboard World Digital Song Sales chart becoming her second top 10 entry on the chart.

== Accolades ==
On August 6, 2020, Somi took her first music show trophy with the song on Mnet's M Countdown.

Music program awards
Program	Date	Ref.
M Countdown	August 6, 2020	

Year-end lists
Critic/Publication	List	Rank	Ref.
Hypebae	Best K-Pop Songs and Music Videos of 2020	—N/a	

== Credits and personal ==
Credits adopted from album liner notes and Tidal.

Studios

- The Black Label Studio – recording (South Korean, Seoul)
- Gudwin music group – mixing (inc)
- The Lap – mixing (LA)
- Sterling Sound – mastering (NYC)

Song credits

- Somi – vocals, lyricist, composer
- Teddy Park – lyricist, composer, music producer, creative director, executive
- Danny Chung – lyricist
- R. Tee – composer, arranger, music producer
- 24 – composer, arranger, music producer
- Youngju Bang – recording engineer
- Yong-in Choi – recording engineer
- Josh Gudwin – mixing
- Jason Roberts – mixing
- Chris Gehringer – mastering

Visual credits

- Gee Eun – visual director & stylist
- Visual team
  - Onyou kim
  - Monica Kim
- Artwork team
  - Seuki Kim
  - Jeong Yoon Yoon
  - Chansol Joo
  - Hyona Park
  - Youngsun Cho
- photographer team
  - Jiyoung Yoon
  - Chae Dae Han
  - Junkyung Lee
  - Heejin Kim
- Stylist team
  - Jin Lim
  - Soojeong I'm
  - Hye Young Jung

== Charts ==
=== Weekly charts ===
Weekly chart performance for "What You Waiting For"
Chart (2020)	Peak position
Malaysia (RIM)	8
New Zealand Hot Singles (RMNZ)	38
Singapore (RIAS)	2
South Korea (Gaon)	53
South Korea (K-pop Hot 100)	33
US World Digital Song Sales (Billboard)	8

=== Monthly charts ===
Monthly chart performance for "What You Waiting For"
Chart (2020)	Peak positions
South Korea (Gaon)	134

== Certifications ==
Certifications for "What You Waiting For"
Region	Certification	Certified units/sales
Brazil (Pro-Música Brasil)	Gold	20,000^{‡}
^{‡} Sales+streaming figures based on certification alone.

== Release history ==
Region	Date	Format	Label
Various	July 22, 2020	Digital download; streaming	The Black Label
United States	July 22, 2020	Digital download; streaming	Interscope

== See also ==
- List of M Countdown Chart winners (2020)
