= Not Shy (song) =

2020 single by Itzy

Single by Itzy

from the EP Not Shy
- Released: August 17, 2020
- Recorded: 2020
- Genre: Trap; dance; R&B
- Length: 2:58
- Label: JYP; Republic
- Composers: Kobee; Charlotte Wilson
- Lyricist: J.Y. Park "The Asiansoul"

Itzy singles chronology
"Wannabe" (2020)	"Not Shy" (2020)	"In the Morning" (2021)

Music video
- "Not Shy" on YouTube "Not Shy (English Ver.)" on YouTube

"Not Shy" is a song recorded by South Korean girl group Itzy for their third extended play of the same name. It was released as the EP's lead single through JYP Entertainment and Republic on August 17, 2020. It is a song that blends R&B and trap-dance, driven by rapid beats and 'intense' saxophone sounds. With a mix of hip-hop, pop, and Caribbean influences, featuring lyrics by J.Y. Park. The song encourages confident expression of love without hesitation, reflecting a notable shift in the group's style with its upbeat tempo and empowering message.

Commercially, "Not Shy" peaked at number nine on the Gaon Digital Chart and at number four on the Billboard K-pop Hot 100, earning Itzy their fourth top-ten hit on both charts. The song won five music program awards in South Korea and has since been certified gold by the Recording Industry Association of Japan (RIAJ). An accompanying music video was uploaded onto JYP's YouTube channel simultaneously with the single's release and has surpassed 200 million views on the platform.

== Background ==
On June 22, 2020, it was reported that Itzy is preparing for a comeback at the end of July. On January 22, 2021 an English version of "Not Shy" was released on Itzy's English debut extended play Not Shy (English Ver.). It was accompanied by a music video featuring 3-D Zepeto avatars of the members. A Japanese version of "Not Shy" was also included on Itzy's first compilation album It'z Itzy, which was released on December 22, 2021. The Japanese lyrics were written by Yohei.

== Composition and lyrics ==
"Not Shy" composed by Kobee and Charlotte Wilson and it was written by JYP founder JY Park “The Asiansoul” who also handled the arrangement alongside Kobee and earattack. The song is an up-tempo R&B trap-dance piece, led by rapid beats and 'intense' saxophone sounds. It seamlessly blends hip-hop and pop elements with Caribbean influences, exuding a distinct 'reggae feel.' In terms of musical notation, the song is written in the key of D minor, with a tempo of 101 beats per minute.

The title song “Not Shy” delivers the message that you should express yourself confidently and be fearless in love. I think this song will encourage many people. I am most proud of this song too, as I like the message of this song very much.

— Chaeryeong, in an interview with Elle.

Lyrically, it was described as Itzy's first "love-themed song," a departure from their previous style. The song's storyline emphasizes empowering one's voice, in the context of the protagonist declaring her love to her crush—a "confession often marked by hesitancy". Through its verses, the group advocates for confident self-expression, urging listeners to convey their feelings openly and without reservation. Lines like "Why wait, what are you doing?" and "Why can't I tell you my heart?" highlight the singers' unwavering courage and honesty in love, promoting a message of authenticity and fearlessness. Additionally, phrases such as "Not shy, Not me / I tell you what I want quickly / What if I can't have it? 'Why can’t you say yeah'" serve as a source of encouragement for those grappling with expressing their emotions, inspiring them to bravely pursue their romantic desires.

== Release and promotion ==
=== Release ===
Before the release on August 17, the group conducted a live stream titled "Countdown Spot Live" via their social media platforms to engage with their fans. On the same day, they hosted another live stream named "ITZY 'Not Shy' Live Premiere" on their official YouTube channel, airing an hour and a half prior to the release. During this broadcast, the members introduced the new album, discussed the songs and choreography, and offered sneak peeks of the music video and behind-the-scenes preparations. Concurrently, the song was released on various streaming platforms.

=== Promotion ===
Itzy commenced their promotional activities on August 18, starting with appearances on South Korean radio shows like SBS's Choi Hwa-jung's Power Time and MBC's Idol Radio. Throughout the week, they graced various South Korean music programs including Mnet's M Countdown, KBS2's Music Bank, MBC's Show! Music Core, and SBS's Inkigayo, marking a successful comeback. On 25th, they appeared as a guest on MBC' FM4U's "Song of Hope at Noon, Kim Shin-young." On August 29, they performed on the American TV show MTV Fresh Out Live and later shared a full performance on their YouTube channel. On September 8, Itzy engaged with their fans in a special event called "Rooftop Live," where they performed "Not Shy" and other tracks. Their 4-week promotional schedule concluded on September 13 with another appearance on Inkigayo.

== Reception ==
Professional ratings
Review scores
Source	Rating
IZM	2.5/5 stars

Time called "Not Shy" one of the songs that defined 2020, praising its usage of the saxophone tunes, urgent percussion and "the group’s sassy utterance", as well as how the group's established their "repertoire of self-empowering anthems in the short period since it debuted in 2019." It was included in CNN Philippines' list of best K-pop songs of 2020. "Not Shy" won five music program awards, including a triple crown (or three wins) on M Countdown. It received nominations for Artist of the Year – Digital Music (August) at the 10th Gaon Chart Music Awards and Best Lyrics – Foreign at the Hong Kong Asian Pop Music Awards.

Music program awards for "Not Shy"
Program	Date	Ref.
Show Champion	August 26, 2020	
Music Bank	August 28, 2020	
M Countdown	September 3, 2020	
M Countdown	September 10, 2020	
M Countdown	September 17, 2020	

== Credits and personnel ==
Credits adopted from Melon.

Studio

- JYPE Studio – recording, mixing, digital editing
- Sterling Sound – mastering
- Studio Nomad – digital editing

Personnel

- Itzy – vocals
- Park Jin-young – lyrics, arrangement
- Sophia Pae – english lyrics, vocal director, vocal engineer
- Charlotte Wilson — composition
- Earattack — arrangement
- Kobee — composition, arrangement, vocal director, synths, bass, drum, computer programming
- Perry (PERRIE) — vocal director
- Eunjung Park — recording engineer
- Manny Marroquin— mixing engineer
- Robin Florent — mixing engineer
- Chris Galland — assisting
- Jeremie Inhaber — assisting
- Zach Pereyra— assisting
- Chris Gehringer — mastering

== Charts ==
=== Weekly charts ===
Weekly chart performance
Chart (2020)	Peak position
Global 200 (Billboard)	124
Japan (Japan Hot 100)	18
Japan Combined Singles (Oricon)	23
Malaysia (RIM)	5
New Zealand Hot Singles (RMNZ)	16
Singapore (RIAS)	2
South Korea (Gaon)	9
South Korea (K-pop Hot 100)	4
UK Indie Breakers (OCC)	12
US World Digital Song Sales (Billboard)	8

=== Monthly charts ===
Monthly chart performance
Chart (2020)	Peak Position
South Korea (Gaon)	46

=== Year-end charts ===
Year-end chart performance
Chart (2020)	Position
South Korea (Gaon)	113

== Certifications ==
Region	Certification	Certified units/sales
Streaming
Japan (RIAJ)	Gold	50,000,000^{†}
^{†} Streaming-only figures based on certification alone.

== Release history ==
Release history
Region	Date	Format	Version	Label	Ref
Various	August 17, 2020	Digital download; streaming	Original (Korean)	JYP; Republic; Dreamus	
Various	January 22, 2021	Digital download; streaming	English	JYP; Republic; Dreamus	

== See also ==
- List of K-pop songs on the Billboard charts
- List of Music Bank Chart winners (2020)
