= List of number-one songs of 2020 (Singapore) =

This is a list of the Singapore Top 30 Digital Streaming number-one songs in 2020, according to the Recording Industry Association Singapore.

== Chart history ==
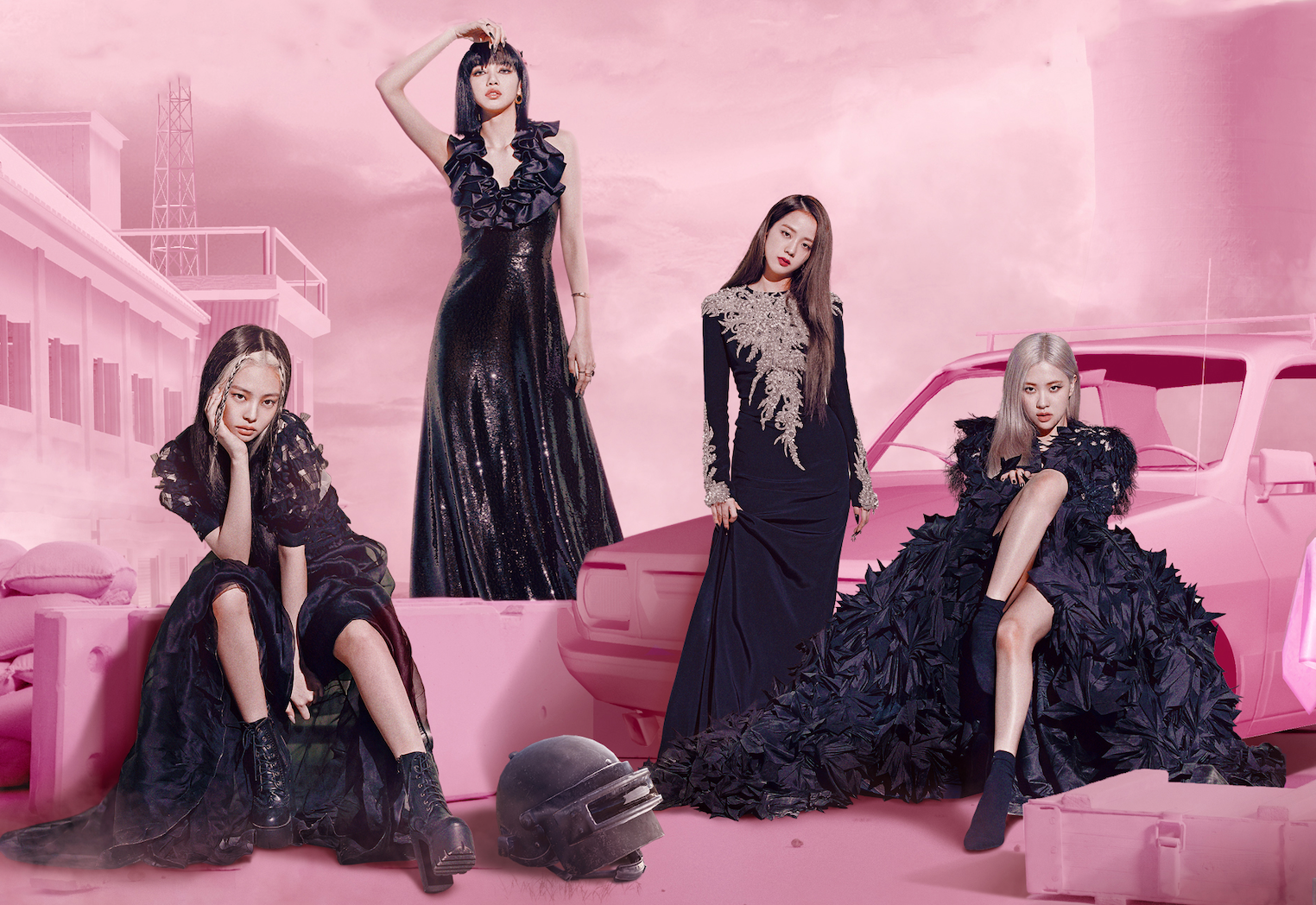
Blackpink earned the most weeks at number one in 2020, topping the chart for 12 weeks with "Sour Candy", "How You Like That" (the longest-running number-one song of the year for 8 consecutive weeks), and "Lovesick Girls".

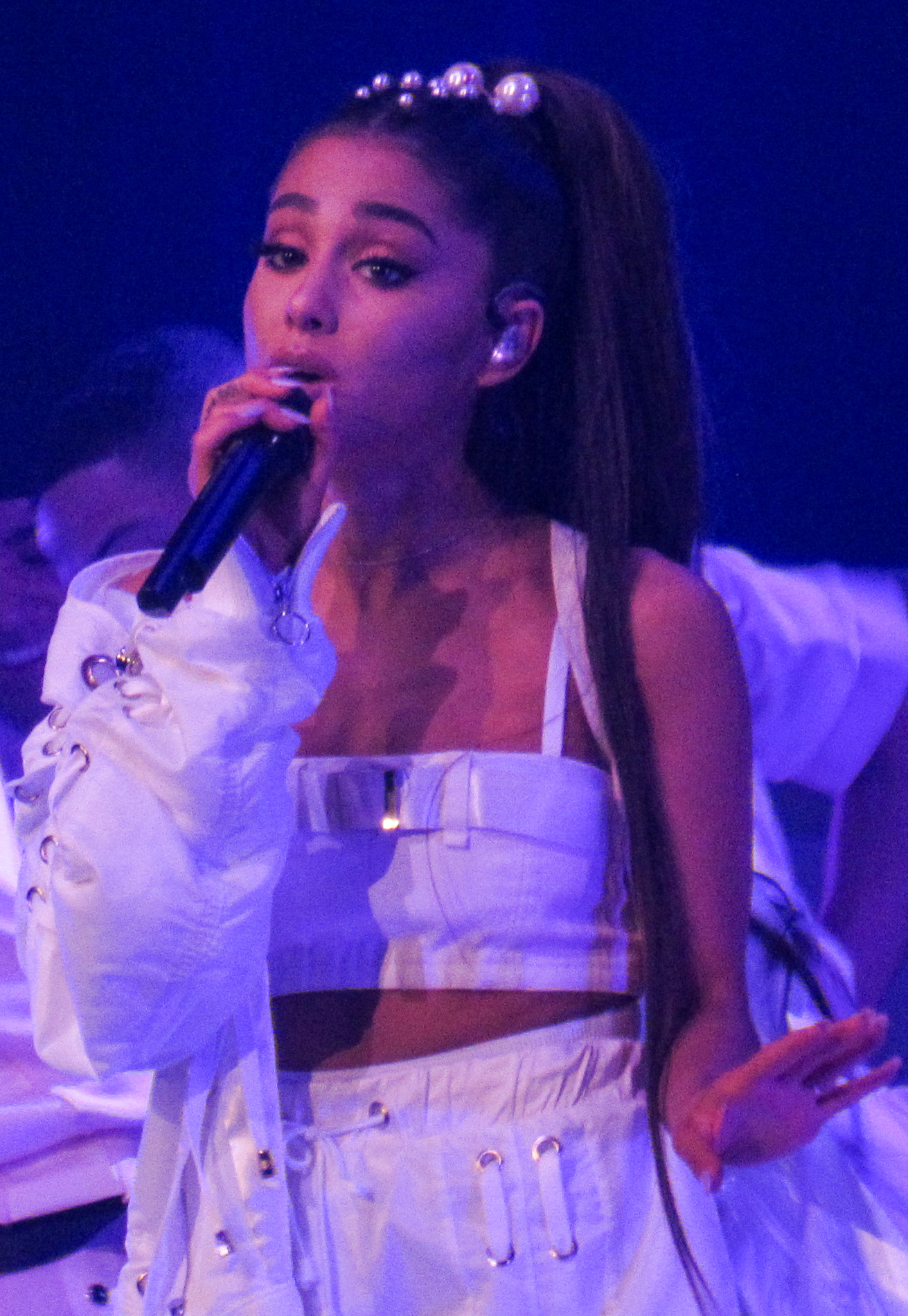
Ariana Grande tied Blackpink for the most number one hits in 2020, with "Rain on Me", "Stuck with U", and "Positions".

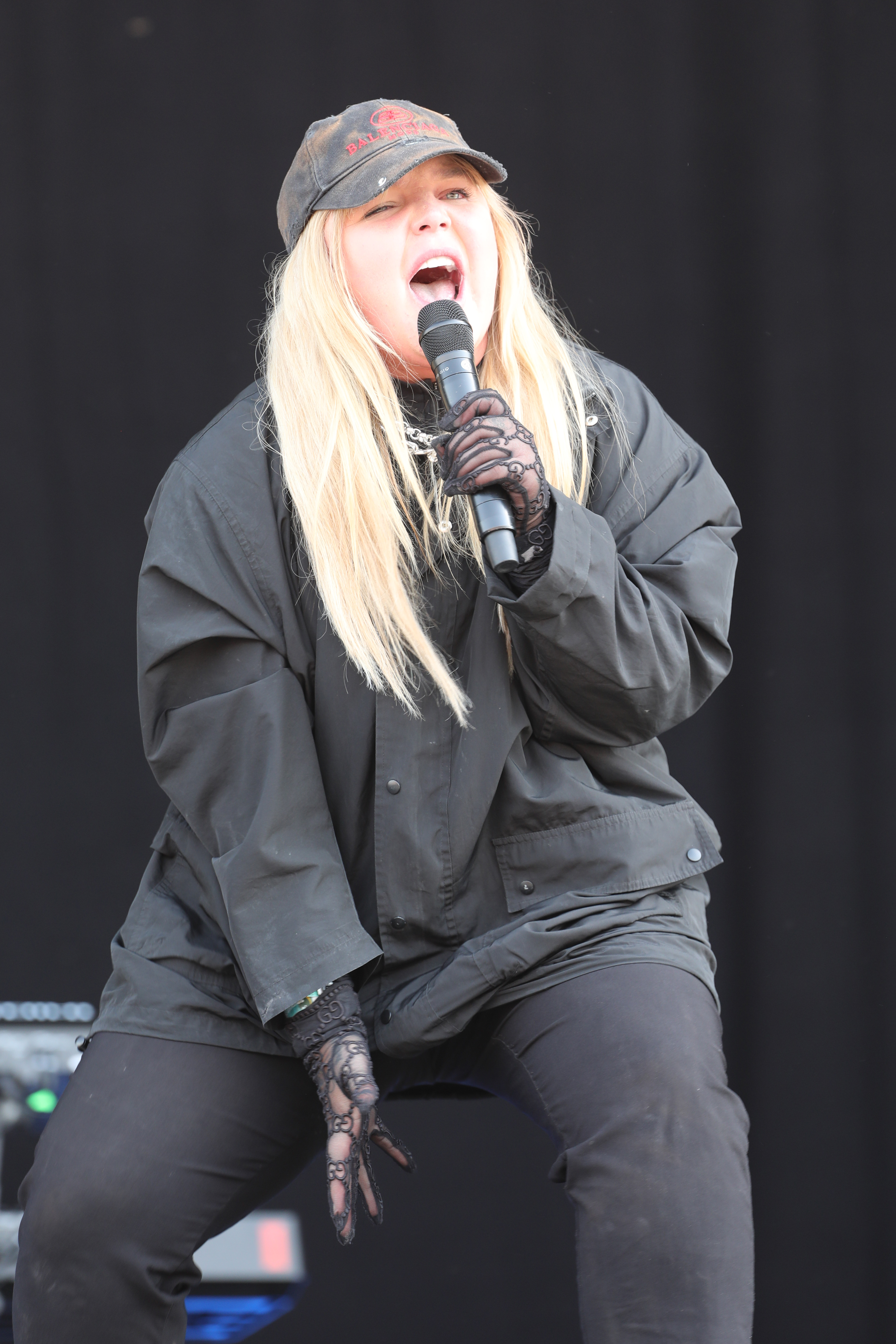
Tones and I topped the chart for 7 weeks with "Dance Monkey".

Issue Date	Song	Artist(s)	Ref.
2 January	"Psycho"	Red Velvet	
9 January	"Dance Monkey"	Tones and I	
16 January	"Dance Monkey"	Tones and I	
23 January	"Dance Monkey"	Tones and I	
30 January	"Dance Monkey"	Tones and I	
6 February	"Dance Monkey"	Tones and I	
13 February	"Dance Monkey"	Tones and I	
20 February	"Dance Monkey"	Tones and I	
27 February	"Intentions"	Justin Bieber featuring Quavo	
5 March	"Intentions"	Justin Bieber featuring Quavo	
12 March	"Intentions"	Justin Bieber featuring Quavo	
19 March	"Wannabe"	Itzy	
26 March	"Wannabe"	Itzy	
2 April	"Don't Start Now"	Dua Lipa	
9 April	"Death Bed (Coffee for Your Head)"	Powfu featuring Beabadoobee	
16 April	"Toosie Slide"	Drake	
23 April	"Blinding Lights"	The Weeknd	
30 April	"Death Bed (Coffee for Your Head)"	Powfu featuring Beabadoobee	
7 May	"Eight"	IU featuring Suga	
14 May	"Eight"	IU featuring Suga	
21 May	"Eight"	IU featuring Suga	
28 May	"Rain on Me"	Lady Gaga and Ariana Grande	
4 June	"Sour Candy"	Lady Gaga and Blackpink	
11 June	"More & More"	Twice	
18 June	"More & More"	Twice	
25 June	"Stuck with U"	Ariana Grande and Justin Bieber	
2 July	"How You Like That"	Blackpink	
9 July	"How You Like That"	Blackpink	
16 July	"How You Like That"	Blackpink	
23 July	"How You Like That"	Blackpink	
30 July	"How You Like That"	Blackpink	
6 August	"How You Like That"	Blackpink	
13 August	"How You Like That"	Blackpink	
20 August	"How You Like That"	Blackpink	
27 August	"Dynamite"	BTS	
3 September	"Dynamite"	BTS	
10 September	"Dynamite"	BTS	
17 September	"Dynamite"	BTS	
24 September	"Dynamite"	BTS	
1 October	"Dynamite"	BTS	
8 October	"Lovesick Girls"	Blackpink	
15 October	"Lovesick Girls"	Blackpink	
22 October	"Lovesick Girls"	Blackpink	
29 October	"Positions"	Ariana Grande	
5 November	"Positions"	Ariana Grande	
12 November	"Positions"	Ariana Grande	
19 November	"Positions"	Ariana Grande	
26 November	"Life Goes On"	BTS	
3 December	"Life Goes On"	BTS	
10 December	"Life Goes On"	BTS	
17 December	"Willow"	Taylor Swift	
24 December	"All I Want for Christmas Is You"	Mariah Carey	
31 December	"Your Name Engraved Herein"	Crowd Lu	

== Number-one artists ==
List of number-one artists by total weeks at number one
Position	Artist	Weeks at No. 1
1	Blackpink	12
2	BTS	9
3	Tones and I	7
4	Ariana Grande	6
5	Justin Bieber	4
6	Quavo	3
6	IU	3
6	Suga	3
7	Itzy	2
7	Powfu	2
7	Beabadoobee	2
7	Lady Gaga	2
8	Red Velvet	1
8	Dua Lipa	1
8	Taylor Swift	1
8	Mariah Carey	1
8	Crowd Lu	1
