= XOXO (song) =

Single by Jeon Somi

from the album XOXO
- Language: Korean; English
- Released: October 29, 2021
- Genre: Pop; dance-pop
- Length: 3:27
- Label: The Black Label; Interscope
- Composers: Pink Sweats; Pacific; Teddy; Jeon Somi; Kush; Danny Chung; VINCE; 24
- Lyricists: Teddy; Danny Chung; Vince; Jeon Somi; Kush

Jeon Somi singles chronology
"Dumb Dumb" (2021)	"XOXO" (2021)	"Fast Forward" (2023)

Music video
- "XOXO" on YouTube

"XOXO" is a song recorded by South Korean and Canadian singer-songwriter Jeon Somi. It was released by The Black Label and Interscope Records on October 29, 2021, as the title track from the singer's debut studio album of the same name. It was written by Teddy, Danny Chung, Vince, Jeon Somi, and Kush, and composed by them alongside Pink Sweats.

== Background and release ==
On October 14, The Black Label announced that Jeon Somi was scheduled to make a comeback with her first full-length album XOXO at the end of the month. In the following week Jeon revealed the release date and shared the tracklist of the album through her social media accounts, which included the lead single entitled "XOXO". The song and its music video were released for digital download and streaming alongside the album on October 29.

== Composition ==
"XOXO" was written by Teddy, Danny Chung, Vince, Jeon Somi, and Kush, and composed by Pink Sweats, Pacific, Teddy, and 24. The song is described as a dance-pop track with a trap beat and a layered chant-like hook. Lyrically, the song is an anthem filled with anger and centers on leaving a cheating partner and no longer letting one's feelings be trivialized. According to Somi, the title of the song is "the goodbye you send to the player who cheated on you" and 'XOXO' are "hugs and kisses that are a bit more evil than sweet”.

== Critical reception ==
NME's Carmen Chin praised the song as "ridiculously catchy" with "well-placed rap verses and an earworm of a chorus". However, she criticized it as a "foolproof but boring pop anthem" made specifically to appeal to the general audience.

== Music video ==
On October 27, the music video teaser was released. On October 29, the official music video was released. The video takes place after the music video for "Dumb Dumb" and opens with a scene of Jeon Somi discovering she’s been cheated on by her lover. She deals with her heartbreak by embarking on a revenge mission on her ex-boyfriend. She playfully wields a sledgehammer as she skips around a graffiti-covered car in an outdoor parking lot in some scenes, and completely trashes a hallway in others.

== Accolades ==
Awards and nominations
Year	Organization	Award	Result	Ref.
2021	Asian Pop Music Awards	Best Composer – Overseas (Note: Pink Sweats, Pacific, Teddy Park, and 24 credited as nominees)	Nominated	
2021	Asian Pop Music Awards	Best Music Video – Overseas	Nominated	
2021	Asian Pop Music Awards	Record of the Year – Overseas	Nominated	

== Charts ==
=== Weekly charts ===
Weekly chart performance for "XOXO"
Chart (2021)	Peak positions
Global 200 (Billboard)	185
Malaysia (RIM)	17
New Zealand Hot Singles (RMNZ)	24
Singapore (RIAS)	6
South Korea (Gaon)	43
South Korea (K-pop 100)	33
US World Digital Song Sales (Billboard)	9

=== Monthly charts ===
Chart (2021)	Peak positions
South Korea (Gaon)	52
South Korea (K-pop 100)	67

== Release history ==
Region	Date	Format	Label
Various	October 29, 2021	Digital download; streaming	The Black Label
United States	October 29, 2021	Digital download; streaming	Interscope
