= Wannabe (Itzy song) =

2020 single by Itzy

Single by Itzy

from the EP It'z Me
- Released: March 9, 2020
- Recorded: 2019–2020
- Genre: K-pop; bubblegum pop; acid house
- Length: 3:11
- Label: JYP
- Songwriter: Galactika

Itzy singles chronology
"Icy" (2019)	"Wannabe" (2020)	"Not Shy" (2020)

Music video
- "Wannabe" on YouTube "Wannabe (Japanese Ver.)" on YouTube

"Wannabe" is a song that was recorded by South Korean girl group Itzy and released on their second extended play (EP) titled It'z Me. JYP Entertainment released the song as the EP's lead single on March 9, 2020. It was written and produced by Galactika (Korean: 별들의 전쟁), who also produced the group's debut track "Dalla Dalla". The song combines house, hip-hop and pop production with bubblegum-pop melodies.

"Wannabe" received generally favorable reviews from music critics. It was a commercial success, charting in eight countries and peaking at number six on the Gaon Digital Chart and at number two on the Billboard K-pop Hot 100, their third top-ten hit in their native country. It topped the charts in Malaysia and Singapore, becoming their first number-one song on both charts. The song has since been certified gold by the Recording Industry Association of America (RIAA) and the Recording Industry Association of Japan (RIAJ).

Naive Creative Production directed the song's accompanying music video, which was uploaded onto JYP's YouTube channel simultaneously with the single's release. Within 24 hours, the music video accumulated over 11 million views and has accumulated more than 500 million views as of 2023, making it their most-viewed music video on the platform. Following the release of It'z Me, Itzy promoted the song with live performances on several South Korean music television programs and amassed eight music show trophies.

== Background and release ==
On February 19, 2020, a teaser confirming Itzy would be having a comeback on March 9 with their second EP It'z Me was released. On February 21 another teaser image was posted on the group's official social media, confirming the EP's lead single would be "Wannabe". Individual teasers for each member were released between February 24 and 28. On March 2, JYP Entertainment released a short, instrumental film of the song. More teaser images were posted for the next two days. Two teasers for the music video were released on March 5 and 6.

JYP Entertainment released "Wannabe" and its music video for digital download and streaming on March 9, 2020, as the lead single from It'z Me. On January 22, 2021, Itzy released their first English-language EP Not Shy, which includes the English version of "Wannabe".

The Japanese version of "Wannabe" was released as digital single on November 1, 2021. The Japanese lyrics were written by Yohei.

== Composition ==
"Wannabe"
A 16-second sample of "Wannabe".

"Wannabe" was written and produced by music production team Galactika (별들의전쟁), who also produced the band's debut track "Dalla Dalla". "Wannabe" combines house and hip-hop/pop production, and bubblegum-pop melodies; the lyrics stress the importance of personal identity and individuality. The song is composed in the key of F♯ minor; it has an average tempo of 122 beats per minute and runs for three minutes and eleven seconds. The members of the group said the song "delivers a message that 'I am precious as I am' ".

== Critical reception ==
"Wannabe" was met with generally positive reviews from music critics. J.M.K. of Billboard said Itzy's "brand of girl crush is less the confident scoff of BLACKPINK's 'Look at you, now look at me' and more 'Look to me, now look at you!' " and that the single "invite[s] us again to dance, gilding a shapeshifting electro-pop beat and 2000s guitar-pop chugs with whimsical flourishes".

Taylor Glasby from Dazed ranked the song at number 17 on "The 40 best K-pop songs of 2020", writing the song "joins the self-confident canon of 'Icy' and 'Dalla Dalla' but its refrain of 'I don't wanna be somebody, I wanna be me, me, me' combines youthful impatience with a universal frustration at hiding oneself, giving them their most instantly sticky and durable hit yet".

"Wannabe" on critic lists
Critic/Publication	List	Rank	Ref.
Billboard	The 20 Best K-pop Songs of 2020	15	
BuzzFeed	Best K-pop Music Videos of 2020	27	
Dazed	The 40 best K-pop songs of 2020	17	
Paper	The 40 best K-pop songs of 2020	5	
Rolling Stone	100 Greatest Songs in the History of Korean Pop Music	39	
SCMP	The best 15 singles from K-pop groups in 2020	15	

== Music video and promotion ==
The music video for "Wannabe" was released on March 9, 2020, along with the EP. The video was directed by Naive Creative Production, who also directed the videos for "Dalla Dalla" and "Icy". As of December 2021, the video had had over 400 million views and 5.3 million likes on YouTube, and was ranked sixth on 2020 YouTube's Most Popular Music Video in South Korea. On March 15, the dance practice video for "Wannabe" was released on Itzy's official YouTube channel.

To mark the EP's release, Itzy held a live broadcast on V Live, in which they also performed the full choreography of the song for the first time. The group promoted "Wannabe" on several South Korean television shows, including M Countdown, Music Bank, Show! Music Core, and Inkigayo, between March 12 and April 6.

== Commercial performance ==
"Wannabe" debuted at number six on the Gaon Digital Chart, giving the group their third top-ten song. The song debuted at number four on the US World Digital Song Sales chart. It was the group's first top-five entry since "Dalla Dalla" and their third top-ten entry overall. In New Zealand, the song peaked at number 22 on the Hot Singles chart. In Japan, it debuted and peaked at number 23, making it their highest peak on that chart. "Wannabe" was the group's debut on the Canadian Hot 100 at number 92, becoming only the sixth female K-pop act to appear on the chart after CL, Red Velvet, Blackpink, Jennie, and Twice. "Wannabe" topped the charts in Malaysia and Singapore, becoming their first number-one song on both charts.

== Credits and personnel ==
Credits adapted from NetEase Music.

- Itzy — primary vocals
- Woobin — composition, drums, keyboard
- GALACTIKA * — arrangement
- FRIDAY. (GALACTIKA *) — background vocals
- e.NA — background vocals
- CHANG (GALACTIKA *) — drums, bass, keyboard
- ATHENA (GALACTIKA *) — keyboards
- Kim Park Chella — guitar, bass
- War of Stars * (GALACTIKA *) - songwriting, composition, background vocals recording
- HONZO — digital editing
- Lee Tae-seop — mixer
- Chris Gehringer — mastering

== Accolades ==
Itzy received their second Digital Bonsang award at the 35th Golden Disc Awards, which they previously achieved with "Dalla Dalla". "Wannabe" was also nominated for a Digital Daesang. At the Mnet Asian Music Awards the song was nominated for Best Dance Performance and Song of the Year. "Wannabe" received 8 music show wins, including a triple crown on M Countdown and Inkigayo, and a double crown on Show Champion.

Awards and nominations for "Wannabe"
Year	Organization	Award	Result	Ref.
2020	Asian Pop Music Awards	Best Arranger (Overseas) (Note: Team Galactika credited as nominee)	Nominated	
2020	Mnet Asian Music Awards	Best Dance Performance Female Group	Nominated	
2020	Mnet Asian Music Awards	Song of the Year	Nominated	
2021	Gaon Chart Music Awards	Artist of the Year – Digital Music (March)	Nominated	
2021	Golden Disc Awards	Best Digital Song (Bonsang)	Won	
2021	Golden Disc Awards	Song of the Year (Daesang)	Nominated	

Music program awards
Program	Date	Ref
M Countdown	March 19, 2020	
M Countdown	March 26, 2020	
M Countdown	April 2, 2020	
Inkigayo	March 22, 2020	
Inkigayo	March 29, 2020	
Inkigayo	April 5, 2020	
Show Champion	March 25, 2020	
Show Champion	April 1, 2020	

== Charts ==
=== Weekly charts ===
Peak chart performance for "Wannabe"
Chart (2020)	Peak position
Canada Hot 100 (Billboard)	92
Japan (Japan Hot 100)	23
Japan Combined Singles (Oricon)	38
Malaysia (RIM)	1
New Zealand Hot Singles (RMNZ)	22
Singapore (RIAS)	1
South Korea (Gaon)	6
South Korea (Kpop Hot 100)	2
UK Indie Breakers (OCC)	12
US World Digital Songs (Billboard)	4

=== Monthly charts ===
Monthly chart performance for "Wannabe"
Chart (2020)	Peak position
South Korea (Gaon)	8

=== Year-end charts ===
Year-end chart performance for "Wannabe"
Chart (2020)	Position
South Korea (Gaon)	53

== Certifications ==
Region	Certification	Certified units/sales
United States (RIAA)	Gold	500,000^{‡}
Streaming
Japan (RIAJ)	Platinum	100,000,000^{†}
^{‡} Sales+streaming figures based on certification alone.^{†} Streaming-only figures based on certification alone.

== Release history ==
Release formats for "Wannabe"
Region	Date	Format	Label	Ref.
Various	March 9, 2020	Digital download, streaming	JYP Entertainment	

== See also ==
- List of Inkigayo Chart winners (2020)
- List of K-pop songs on the Billboard charts
- List of M Countdown Chart winners (2020)
- List of number-one songs of 2020 (Malaysia)
- List of number-one songs of 2020 (Singapore)
