= Dumb Dumb (Jeon Somi song) =

Single by Jeon Somi

from the album XOXO
- Language: Korean; English
- Released: August 2, 2021
- Genre: Dance-pop
- Length: 2:29
- Label: The Black Label; Interscope
- Composers: Teddy; R. Tee; 24; Dominsuk
- Lyricists: Teddy; Danny Chung; Jeon Somi

Jeon Somi singles chronology
"What You Waiting For" (2020)	"Dumb Dumb" (2021)	"XOXO" (2021)

Music video
- "Dumb Dumb" on YouTube

"Dumb Dumb" (stylized in all caps) is a song recorded by South Korean and Canadian singer-songwriter Jeon Somi. It was released by The Black Label and Interscope Records on August 2, 2021, as a pre-release single from the singer's debut studio album XOXO. The song peaked at number 8 on the Gaon Digital Chart and at number 9 on the K-pop Hot 100, becoming Somi's first top-ten single on both charts.

== Background and release ==
"Dumb Dumb"
"Dumb Dumb" is a song about a girl who has developed a crush. The track begins with a cutesy melody and lyrics accompanied by a whistle riff throughout. Jeon was credited as a co-lyricist.

On July 14, 2021, The Black Label confirmed that Jeon Somi would make a comeback, though it was unclear whether in what format the comeback would be. Then, they released first promotional poster on July 23, that revealed the format as a single, it also included the song's release date and the title of the single "Dumb Dumb". The following day the second promotional poster was released. On July 26, the third promotional poster was released. On July 28, the fourth promotional poster was released. On the next day, they released the fifth promotional poster. On August 1, a credits poster was unveiled revealing the Somi was involved in the songs's writing. On August 2, "Dumb Dumb" was released digitally at 18:00 (KST).

The original lyrics to the hook of the song were "Imma say it like it is/ cut the bullsh*t/ you dumb dumb"; in the official version, they have been translated to Korean. Jeon attributed the longer wait between comebacks to this recording process and vouched it makes the result good.

== Critical reception ==
Professional ratings
Review scores
Source	Rating
IZM	2.5/5 stars
NME	2/5 stars

NME's Rhian Daly gave the song a two-star rating calling it "frustrating and underwhelming." She commented how "Dumb Dumb" could be stronger if it was given time to develop "but at two minutes and 30 seconds, it's over before it really gets going." Although reviewing the song negatively she called the "chorus' dirty bass" and "Somi's accompanying shift into her lower register alluring and arresting." Yeom Dong-gyo of IZM gave "Dumb Dumb" a two and half star rating and said the song "blends the boldness of "What You Waiting For" and the freshness of "Birthday".

== Music video ==
On July 30, the music video teaser was released. On August 2, the official music video was released. It features Somi, who appeared as a high school student that falls in love with one of the most handsome members of the sports team at lunchtime, and then goes into operation to get a confession. It turned out, both of them were pretending to play "dumb" so they can approach each other. At the end of the video, Somi looked happy after receiving the man's confession. With some eye-catching animations inserted in the middle, the music video has been described as feeling like a teen movie. It gained ten million views in just a day.

== Promotion ==
On the same day as the song release, an online media showcase was held for Somi to celebrate the release with JooE from Momoland as the MC. Somi also held a comeback live stream on her official TikTok account.

== Accolades ==
Award and nominations for "Dumb Dumb"
Year	Organization	Award	Result	Ref.
2021	Asian Pop Music Awards	Top 20 Songs of the Year – Overseas	Won	
2021	Asian Pop Music Awards	Best Arranger – Overseas (Note: Teddy, R. Tee, and 24 credited as nominees)	Nominated	
2021	Asian Pop Music Awards	Best Dance Performance – Overseas	Nominated	
2021	Asian Pop Music Awards	Song of the Year – Overseas	Nominated	
2021	Mnet Asian Music Awards	Best Dance Performance – Solo	Nominated	
2021	Mnet Asian Music Awards	Song of the Year	Longlisted	
2022	Gaon Chart Music Awards	Song of the Year – August	Nominated	
2022	Golden Disc Awards	Best Digital Song (Bonsang)	Nominated	
2022	Joox Malaysia Music Awards	Top 5 K-Pop Hits	Won	
2022	Seoul Music Awards	Bonsang Award	Nominated	

Music program awards for "Dumb Dumb"
Program	Network	Date	Ref.
M! Countdown	Mnet	August 12, 2021	

== Charts ==
=== Weekly charts ===
Weekly chart performance for "Dumb Dumb"
Chart (2021)	Peak position
Global Excl. U.S. (Billboard)	130
Singapore (RIAS)	7
South Korea (Gaon)	8
South Korea (K-pop 100)	9
US World Digital Song Sales (Billboard)	5

=== Monthly charts ===
Monthly chart performance for "Dumb Dumb"
Chart (2021)	Peak position
South Korea (Gaon)	10
South Korea (K-pop 100)	9

=== Year-end charts ===
Year-end chart performance for "Dumb Dumb"
Chart (2021)	Position
South Korea (Gaon)	81
Chart (2022)	Position
South Korea (Circle)	188

== Certifications ==
Certifications for "Dumb Dumb"
Region	Certification	Certified units/sales
Brazil (Pro-Música Brasil)	Gold	20,000^{‡}
^{‡} Sales+streaming figures based on certification alone.

== Release history ==
Region	Date	Format	Label
Various	August 2, 2021	Digital download; streaming	The Black Label
United States	August 2, 2021	Digital download; streaming	Interscope
