= Not Shy =

- Digital and A version cover

EP by Itzy
- Released: August 17, 2020
- Recorded: 2020
- Studio: JYPE Studios
- Genres: K-pop; pop rock; hip hop
- Length: 19:36
- Languages: Korean; English
- Label: JYP

Itzy chronology
It'z Me (2020)	Not Shy (2020)	Guess Who (2021)

Singles from Not Shy
- 1. "Not Shy" Released: August 17, 2020

Not Shy is the third extended play by South Korean girl group Itzy. It was released on August 17, 2020, by JYP Entertainment. It is available in three versions and contains six tracks, including the lead single of the same name. The EP marks a growth in music production and collaboration as they tap known hitmakers such as SM Entertainment songwriter Kenzie and producers LDN Noise. Musically, Not Shy is a K-pop record that contains influences of pop rock and hip hop.

The album received positive reviews from critics, who commended Itzy's departure from themes of independence and self-love to the theme of love. Upon its release, Not Shy debuted at the top spot of the Gaon Albums Chart and went on to sell almost 206,280 copies on its first month of release in South Korea. The album also charted in Japan, Poland and the United States, peaking at number 8 on the Billboard World Albums chart.

On January 22, 2021, Itzy's English debut extended play Not Shy (English Version) was released. It included English versions of "Not Shy" and previous title tracks "Dalla Dalla", "Icy", and "Wannabe".

== Background and release ==
"“It is true that ITZY is in the middle of comeback preparations. We will announce the official schedule at a later date.”"

— JYP Entertainment shared to Xportsnews.

On June 22, 2020, it was announced that Itzy was preparing for a comeback. On July 31, Itzy released a preview of the physical Not Shy EP, and on August 3, they shared a teaser image for the comeback. On August 10, the group unveiled the track list for the EP. The music video teaser was then released on August 12, and the highlight medley released soon after on August 16. Not Shy officially released on August 17, 2020, through several music portals including iTunes and Spotify.

== Music and composition ==
The album zeroes in on the K-pop quintet's teenage years under the limelight while shouting out their loyal fans who've stood by them. Musically, Not Shy is a K-pop record that contains influences of pop-rock and hip-hop. The EP also marks a growth in music production and collaboration as they tap known K-pop hitmakers such as SM Entertainment songwriter Kenzie and producers LDN Noise.

The title track blends braggadocious hip-hop and pop production. The second track "Don't Give A What", is a fun pop-rock song that has a catchy hook. The song marks as a natural progression in this feminist theme. "SURF" is a song with a funky bassline. "ID" marks a chord progression for Itzy. "Be in Love" is Itzy's first slower vocally-focused song with a guitar melody.

== Promotion ==
=== Singles ===
"Not Shy" was released as the lead single from the album on August 17, 2020. Itzy became one of the only two girl groups (the other being Blackpink), to appear on both the Billboard Global 200 and the Billboard Global Excl. US Charts, peaking at number 124 and 70 respectively. "Not Shy" also reached the top-ten in South Korea, Singapore and Malaysia. The song went on to win a total of 5 music show wins - 1 on Show Champion and Music Bank, and 3 on MCountdown, briefly tying Itzy with Blackpink for the most wins by a girl group in 2020 with 13 accumulative wins.

== Critical reception ==
Professional ratings
Review scores
Source	Rating
IZM	2.5/5 stars
Billboard	favorable
PopCrush	positive

Heran Mamo of Billboard was positive in her review saying "Featuring six songs, Not Shy zeroes in on the K-pop quintet's teenage years under the limelight while shouting out their loyal fans who've stood by them. ITZY kicked off today's Not Shy release by also showing off the visual for the titular track, which proves the girls are not shy whatsoever". He also wrote that the song "blends braggadocious hip-hop and pop production". PopCrush's Lai Frances considered the album marks a growth in music production and collaboration. She also appreciated their themes of independence and self-love have morphed into a coming-of-age glow-up, with the group tipping their toes into the waters of singing about love.

IZM writer Seonhee Lim opined "that the song was heavily armed with sound that filled the gap, as if it contained the spirit of a young composer. The saxophone's funky rhythm dominates the whole song, and the composition that changes sharply shifts the center of gravity, adding a three-dimensional effect to the music. Overall, it is a melody that flows with power. Particularly, the part that goes from the free chorus to the chorus is smooth and plays a sufficient role to raise the expectation. The members' vocals, which are more natural than before, also play a part. However, she criticized certain factors that hinder this catharsis. The chorus 'ITZY~', which appears in the middle of the chorus, seems to be aimed at addiction, but rather, it only brings embarrassment. It feels like a forcefully fitted. In addition, EDM sounds such as'Turn down for what' and'GDFR', which were popular in the early 2010s, passed by, bringing the point of getting tired more and more in the second half".

== Commercial performance ==
=== South Korea ===
Not Shy debuted at number one on the Gaon Weekly Album Chart with 206,280 album-equivalent units, marking their largest monthly sales and streaming figures. It is Itzy's third number-one album in the country; they also became the first female artist in 2020 to more than have two number one extended plays. In its second week on the Gaon Weekly Album Chart, Not Shy fell off the chart. In its third week, it rose to number nine. The title track peaked at number nine, becoming the group's fourth top ten single.

=== Other markets ===
In Poland, the EP debuted and peaked at number 23, marking their highest ever appearance on a European chart. In the US, Not Shy peaked at number 8 on the US Billboard World Albums chart, but did not make an impact on the Billboard Heatseekers Albums.

== Track listing ==
Not Shy track listing
No.	Title	Lyrics	Music	Arrangement	Length
1.	"Not Shy"	J.Y. Park "The Asiansoul"	Kobee; Charlotte Wilson	J.Y. Park "The Asiansoul"; Kobee; Earattack	2:58
2.	"Don't Give a What"	Lee Seu-ran	Lee Woo-min "collapsedone"; Justin Reinstein; JJean; LACND	Lee Woo-min "collapsedone"; LACND	3:17
3.	"Louder"	Dr. JO	Kairos	Kairos	3:22
4.	"iD"	MosPick; Young Chance	MosPick; Young Chance	MosPick	3:27
5.	"Surf"	Danke (Lalala Studio)	Greg Bonnick; Hayden Chapman; Cazzi Opeia; Ellen Berg	LDN Noise	3:14
6.	"Be in Love"	Kenzie	Kenzie; Caesar & Loui; Cazzi Opeia	Kenzie; Caesar & Loui; Cazzi Opeia	3:21
Total length:					19:36

Not Shy (English Version) track listing
No.	Title	Lyrics	Music	Arrangement	Length
1.	"Not Shy" (English version)	J.Y. Park "The Asiansoul"; Sophia Pae	Kobee; Charlotte Wilson	J.Y. Park "The Asiansoul"; Kobee; Earattack	2:58
2.	"Wannabe" (English version)	Galactika; Sophia Pae	Galactika	Team Galactika	3:12
3.	"Icy" (English version)	J.Y. Park "The Asiansoul"; Penomeco; Sophia Pae	J.Y. Park "The Asiansoul"; Cazzi Opeia; Ellen Berg; Daniel Caesar; Ludwig Lindell; Ashley Alisha; Cameron Neilson; Lauren Dyson	J.Y. Park "The Asiansoul"; Lee Hae-seul	3:11
4.	"Dalla Dalla" (English version)	Galactika; Sophia Pae	Galactika; Atenna	Galactika	3:19
Total length:					12:40

== Charts ==
Chart performance for Not Shy
Chart (2020)	Peak position
Belgian Albums (Ultratop Flanders)	129
Japanese Albums (Oricon)	8
Japanese Hot Albums (Billboard Japan)	18
Polish Albums (ZPAV)	23
South Korean Albums (Gaon)	1
UK Album Downloads (Official Charts)	55
US World Albums (Billboard)	8

== Certifications and sales ==
Certifications and sales figures for Not Shy
Region	Certification	Certified units/sales
Japan	—	13,205
South Korea (KMCA)	Platinum	269,222

== Release history ==
Release formats for Not Shy
Region	Date	Format	Label	Ref.
South Korea	August 17, 2020	CD; digital download; streaming	JYP	
Various	August 17, 2020	Digital download, streaming	JYP	

== See also ==
- List of Gaon Album Chart number ones of 2020
- List of K-pop songs on the Billboard charts
- List of K-pop albums on the Billboard charts
- List of M Countdown Chart winners (2020)
