= XOXO (Jeon Somi album) =

- Digital and physical (KiT version) cover

Studio album by Jeon Somi
- Released: October 29, 2021
- Length: 24:20
- Languages: Korean; English
- Labels: The Black Label; Interscope

Jeon Somi chronology
XOXO (2021)	Game Plan (2023)

Singles from XOXO
- 1. "Birthday" Released: June 13, 2019; 2. "What You Waiting For" Released: July 22, 2020; 3. "Dumb Dumb" Released: August 2, 2021; 4. "XOXO" Released: October 29, 2021

XOXO is the debut studio album by South Korean and Canadian singer-songwriter Jeon Somi. It was released on October 29, 2021, by The Black Label and distributed through YG Plus and Interscope Records. The album consists of eight tracks and was supported by four singles: "Birthday", "What You Waiting For", "Dumb Dumb", and "XOXO". The album features a guest appearance by South Korean rapper and singer Giriboy.

== Background and release ==
Jeon Somi, well known as the winner of the first installation of the Produce 101 competition series and a member of the series' temporary project girl group I.O.I, began to venture out as a soloist following the conclusion of group activities under her then agency JYP Entertainment. She eventually left JYP Entertainment and joined The Black Label and made her solo debut with the digital single "Birthday" and B-side track "Outta My Head" in June 2019. Jeon made two comebacks following year-long breaks with digital singles "What You Waiting For" in July 2020, and "Dumb Dumb" in August 2021. In the press conference for "Dumb Dumb", Jeon shared that she had "spent the past year practicing and recording a lot of songs apart from "Dumb Dumb" ... and there's a lot more coming."

On October 1, 2021, the singer uploaded an image of a pile of albums, with title XOXO and her name printed on them, onto her Instagram post with the caption "Soon to be yours x̷o̷x̷o̷." On October 14, The Black Label announced that Somi is scheduled to make a comeback with her first full-length album XOXO at the end of the month. In the following week Jeon revealed the release date and shared the tracklist of the album through her social media accounts. The album was released for digital download and streaming on October 29, alongside the music video for lead single "XOXO". On December 25, the music video for "Anymore" was released.

== Critical reception ==
Professional ratings
Review scores
Source	Rating
NME	2/5 stars

Carmen Chin writing for NME criticized the songs on the album for being "repetitive and uninspired" and stated that despite Jeon Somi's "immense musical talent", the album "fails to flesh out her identity". Chin also expressed disappointment in half of the short tracklist being made up of Somi’s previous releases.

== Accolades ==
Award and nominations for XOXO
Year	Organization	Award	Result	Ref.
2021	Asian Pop Music Awards	Top 20 Albums of the Year – Overseas	Won	
2021	Asian Pop Music Awards	Best Album of the Year – Overseas	Nominated	

== Track listing ==
XOXO track listing
No.	Title	Lyrics	Music	Arrangement	Length
1.	"Dumb Dumb"	Teddy; Danny Chung; Jeon Somi	Teddy; R. Tee; 24; Dominsuk	Teddy; R. Tee; 24	2:27
2.	"XOXO"	Teddy; Chung; Vince; Somi; Kush	Pink Sweats; Pacific; Teddy; 24	Pink Sweats; Pacific; 24	3:27
3.	"Don't Let Me Go" (featuring Giriboy)	Teddy; Chung; Somi; Giriboy	Teddy; 24; Dominsuk	24; Dominsuk	2:59
4.	"Anymore"	Pink Sweats; Chung	John Hill; Pink Sweats; R. Tee; Vince	R. Tee; Wonjin Seo	3:17
5.	"Watermelon"	Somi	Somi; 24	24	3:02
6.	"Birthday"	Teddy; Brother Su; Bekuh Boom; Chung	Teddy; 24; Bekuh Boom; Somi	24; R. Tee	3:05
7.	"What You Waiting For"	Teddy; Somi; Chung	Teddy; R. Tee; 24; Somi	R. Tee; 24	2:55
8.	"Outta My Head" (어질어질; Eojireojil; lit. 'Getting Dizzy')	Somi	Somi; 24	24	3:08
Total length:					24:20

== Charts ==
=== Weekly charts ===
Chart performance for XOXO
Chart (2021)	Peak position
South Korean Albums (Gaon)	6
US World Albums (Billboard)	14

=== Monthly charts ===
Chart (2021)	Peak position
South Korean Albums (Gaon)	16

== Certifications and sales ==
Certifications for XOXO
Region	Certification	Certified units/sales
South Korea	—	60,988

== Release history ==
Release dates and formats for XOXO
Region	Date	Format	Label	Ref.
Various	October 29, 2021	Digital download; streaming	The Black Label; Interscope	
South Korea	October 29, 2021	Digital download; streaming	The Black Label	
South Korea	November 5, 2021	CD	The Black Label	
