= Birthday (Jeon Somi song) =

Single by Jeon Somi

from the album XOXO
- Language: Korean; English
- B-side: "Outta My Head"
- Released: June 13, 2019
- Genre: Pop rap
- Length: 3:05
- Label: The Black Label
- Composer(s): Teddy; 24; Bekuh Boom; Jeon Somi
- Lyricist(s): Teddy; Brother Su; Bekuh Boom; Danny Chung

Jeon Somi singles chronology
"Nov to Feb" (2017)	"Birthday" (2019)	"What You Waiting For" (2020)

Music video
- "Birthday" on YouTube

"Birthday" is the debut single by South Korean and Canadian singer-songwriter Jeon Somi. The song was released by The Black Label on June 13, 2019.

== Background and release ==
On November 21, 2018, News1 reported that Somi was working on new music with the goal of making her solo debut in March 2019. On February 23, 2019, it was reported that the debut date would be May and that she will be debuting with a song produced by Teddy, also confirming that the recording process was completed and was currently preparing to shoot the accompanying music video. It wasn't confirmed if the release will be a single or an EP.

Shortly after, The Black Label confirmed that Somi will debut in May and that the song produced by Teddy was finished, but the format of the release was not confirmed. Two days later, the agency confirmed that Somi will debut on May 1.

On April 29, it was reported that her debut date was delayed due to internal issues in her agency and the anticipated date of her debut is now late May. It was also cited that the delay was in order to consider the quality of the album. Later on that day, the agency stated that "her album production is complete but the timing of her debut has not been decided yet." It was also added that the music video was not filmed yet.

On May 1, The Black Label released a promotional poster of Somi with her name along with "Debut Coming Soon" written on it. On May 10, the second promotional poster was released, also having the same phrase from the previous photo written on it. Ten days later, The Black Label released the third promotional poster of Somi with a mysterious date written on it, confirming her debut the next month. On June 7, another promotional poster was released, revealing the title track "Birthday" and its credits. The next day, the full tracklist of two songs was released.

On June 13, 2019, "Birthday" was released alongside its music video.

== Composition ==
"Birthday" was written by Teddy, Brother Su, Bekuh Boom and Danny Chung; composed by Teddy, 24, Bekuh Boom and Somi; and arranged by 24 and R.Tee. It is a dance track described as a funky, clap-happy piece of hip-pop confection. The lyrics follow the singer celebrating herself in a refreshing way.

"Outta My Head" is the other song on the single album, written by Somi, who also participated in its composition alongside 24. It was arranged by 24 and described as an alt-R&B track.

== Music video ==
On June 12, the music video teaser for "Birthday" was released. The next day, the official music video was released. The festive setting was overflowing with popping colors and playful party elements, as if the music video was portraying the song's title in the most vibrant way. It showed Somi who perfectly pulled off a variety of styles, ranging from school uniforms to party looks, showing off her "born-to-be idol" charm.

== Commercial performance ==
"Birthday" debuted at number 51 on the Gaon Digital Chart for the week ending June 15, 2019. The following week, it ascended to number 22 on the Gaon Digital Chart, placing at number 8 on the Component Download Chart and at number 79 on the Component Streaming Chart. The lead single of the same name "Birthday" topped major South Korean charts including Mnet, Bugs and Soribada. It also debuted at the US World Digital Song Sales chart with "Outta My Head" at number 7 and 9, respectively.

== Track listing ==
Single album Birthday track listing
No.	Title	Lyrics	Music	Arrangement	Length
1.	"Outta My Head" (어질어질; Eojireojil; lit. Getting Dizzy)	Jeon Somi	Somi; 24	24	3:08
2.	"Birthday"	Teddy; Brother Su; Bekuh Boom; Danny Chung	Teddy; 24; Bekuh Boom; Somi	24; R.Tee	3:05
Total length:					6:13

== Charts ==
=== Weekly charts ===
Weekly chart performance for "Birthday"
Chart (2019)	Peak position
Malaysia (RIM)	20
New Zealand Hot Singles (RMNZ)	28
Singapore (RIAS)	8
South Korea (Gaon)	22
South Korea (K-pop Hot 100)	18
US World Digital Song Sales (Billboard)	5

=== Monthly charts ===
Monthly chart performance for "Birthday"
Chart (2019)	Peak positions
South Korea (Gaon)	50

== Release history ==
Region	Date	Format(s)	Label(s)
Various	June 13, 2019	Digital download; streaming	The Black Label
