= Jeon Somi =

South Korean and Canadian singer (born 2001)

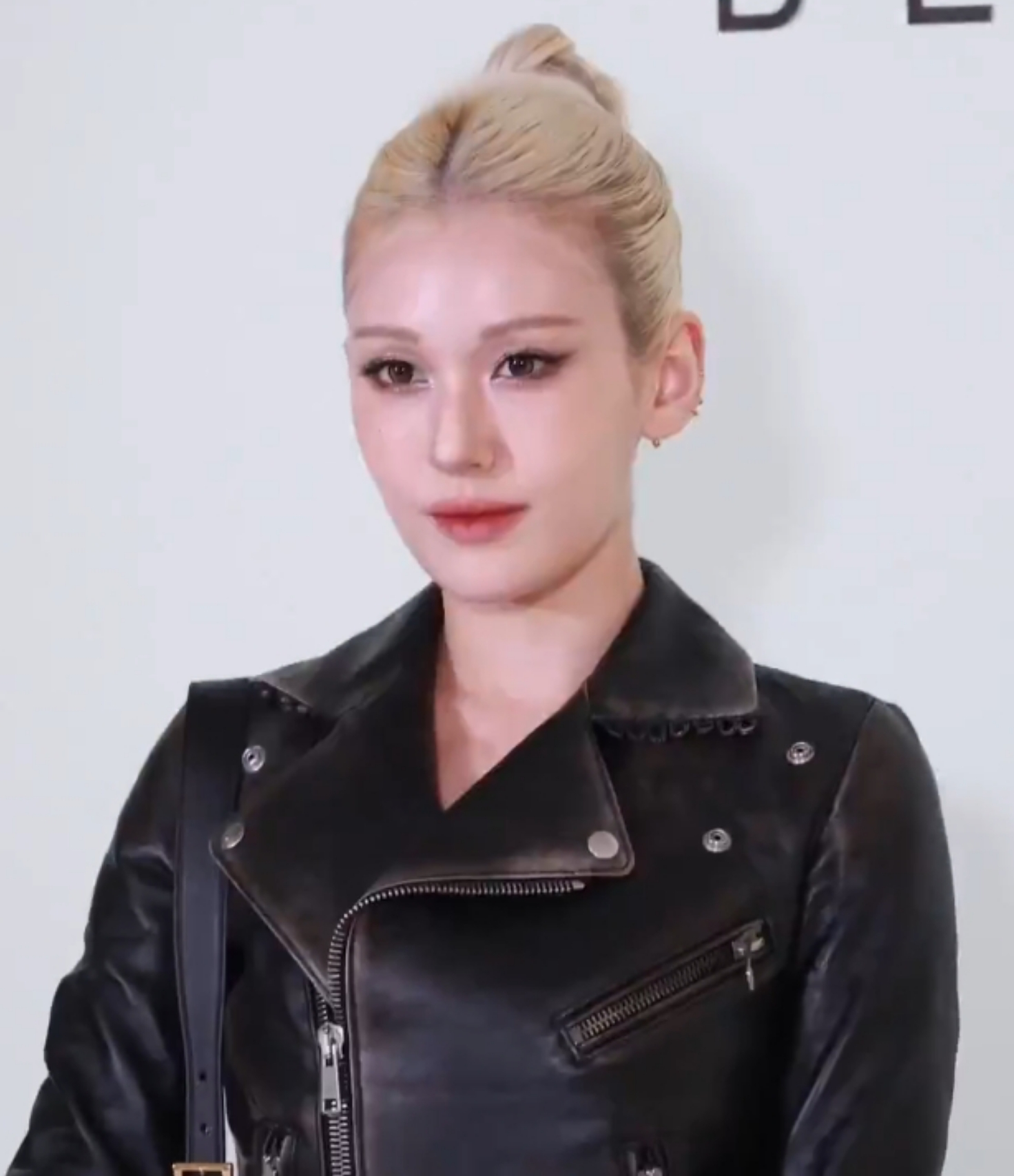
- Jeon in 2024
- Born: Ennik Somi Douma; March 9, 2001 (age 25); Windsor, Ontario, Canada
- Citizenship: South Korea; Canada; Netherlands
- Occupations: Singer; songwriter; rapper; dancer
- Musical career
- Origin: South Korea
- Genres: K-pop; dance-pop; R&B
- Years active: 2013–present
- Labels: JYP; YMC (Note: As a member of I.O.I only); The Black Label; Interscope
- Member of: I.O.I
- Website: jeonsomiofficial.com

Korean name
- Hangul: 전소미
- RR: Jeon Somi
- MR: Chŏn Somi

Ennik Somi Douma (born March 9, 2001), known professionally by her Korean name Jeon Somi (전소미), is a South Korean and Canadian singer. Born in Canada to a South Korean mother and a Dutch-Canadian father, she moved to South Korea as an infant.

Jeon initially rose to fame in South Korea as the first-place winner of the survival reality show Produce 101 and as a member of the show's corresponding eleven-piece girl group I.O.I. Following the conclusion of I.O.I's activities, Jeon signed with YG Entertainment's subsidiary, The Black Label. She made her debut as a solo artist on June 13, 2019, with the single "Birthday". In 2021, she released her first studio album XOXO, which included the top-ten single "Dumb Dumb". She achieved her first top-five single in South Korea with "Fast Forward" in 2023.

== Early life ==
Ennik Somi Douma was born on March 9, 2001, in Windsor, Ontario, to a South Korean mother Jeon Sun-hee and a Canadian father of German and Dutch descent, Matthew Douma; her paternal grandfather immigrated to Canada from Heerenveen. She is the eldest of two daughters. When she was six months old, Jeon and her parents moved to Yeonhui-dong, Seoul, in September 2001 because her mother had developed homesickness. Her father had previously resided in the area when he studied Taekwondo before moving back to Canada. At age four, she made an appearance on television with her father when he was being interviewed by KBS News for his part in clearing snow in the neighborhood.

She initially attended a school for foreigners before transferring to Seoul Midong Elementary School to practice Taekwondo. She stated that she experienced bullying and discrimination at the school because of her mixed ethnicity and wanted to dye her hair black and get surgery to blend in. She graduated from elementary school in 2013, after which she attended Cheongdam Middle School; she graduated on February 3, 2017. Jeon completed her secondary education at Hanlim Multi Art School, majoring in Practical Music and Vocal, graduating in a ceremony held on February 7, 2020.

She first dreamed of becoming a singer after watching the music video for Rihanna's "Don't Stop the Music" as a child. At age nine, she was introduced to Korean pop and discovered Park Bom of 2NE1, whom she admired for her unique voice.

== Career ==
=== 2013–2017: Career beginnings and debut with I.O.I ===
Beginning in her fourth year of elementary school, Jeon auditioned at various entertainment companies in South Korea. In 2013, as a part of the Seoul Midong Elementary School's Taekwondo demonstration team, she appeared in the Children's Day Special for Let's Go! Dream Team Season 2, where she paired with Park Joon-hyung. That same year, she sang and made an appearance in a music video for English education.

In August 2014, Jeon, her mother and her grandmother briefly made an appearance on KBS2's Hello Counselor among the studio audience. She was also cast in a cameo role alongside her sister in the 2014 film Ode to My Father by director Yoon Je-kyoon, who her father was acquainted with and needed two biracial children for his film. That same year, Jeon auditioned for JYP Entertainment with "Lonely" by 2NE1 and was accepted into the agency's trainee program. In 2015, she appeared in label-mate Got7's "Stop Stop It" music video alongside other female trainees. In May 2015, Jeon participated in Mnet reality survival program Sixteen, where she was pitted against fifteen other trainees from the agency to secure a spot in its first girl group in five years (now Twice) after the debut of Miss A; however, Jeon was eliminated in the final round and continued as a trainee. JYP Entertainment founder Park Jin-young stated she had star quality but lacked preparation.

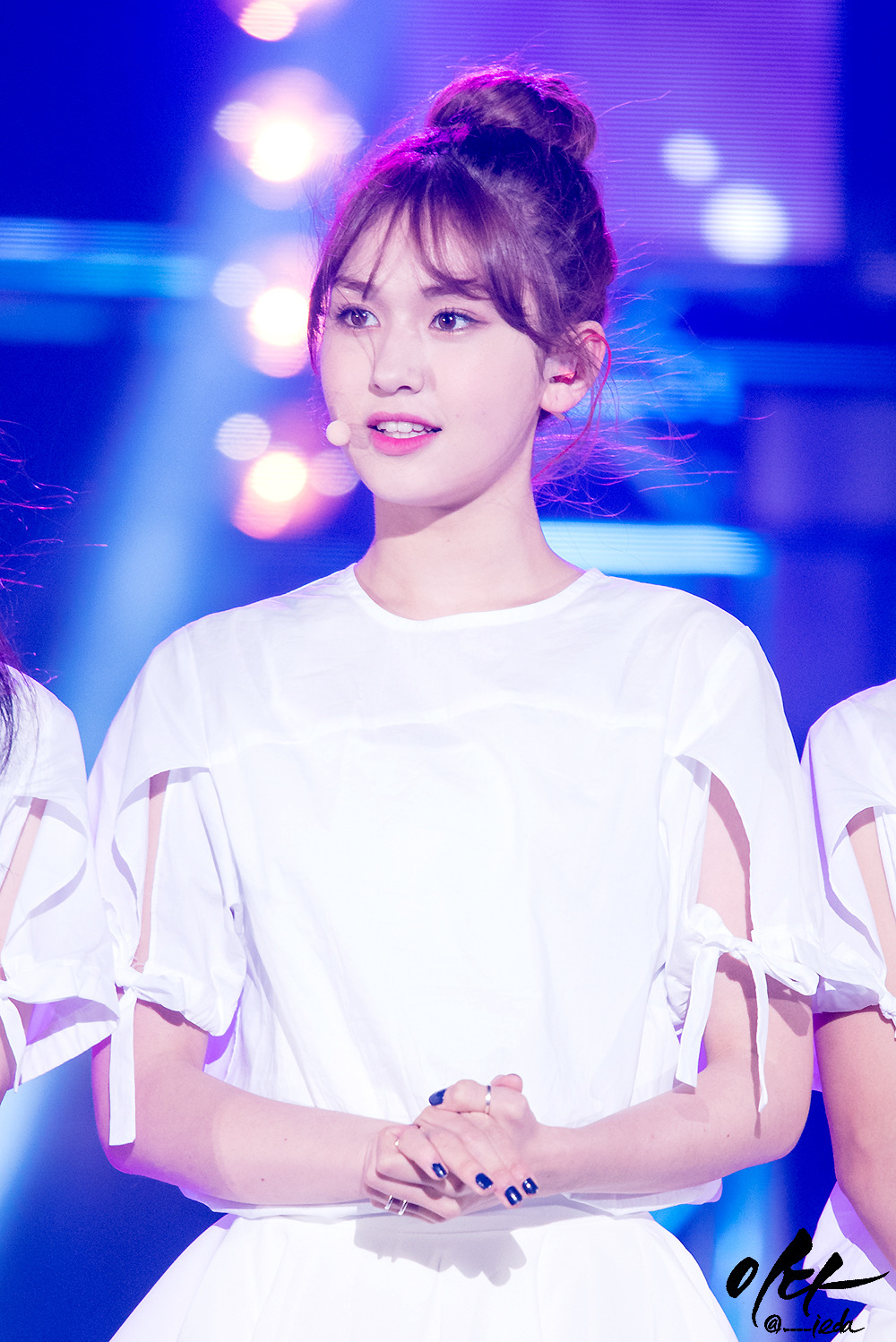
Jeon at a concert in 2016

In January 2016, as a representative of her label, Jeon participated in the competition series Produce 101 and finished in first place with 858,333 votes. After completing a two-and-a-half-year training period, fifteen-year-old Jeon officially debuted on May 4 with the project female group I.O.I and its first extended play Chrysalis under YMC Entertainment. On August 9, Jeon was included in a sub-unit of I.O.I consisting of six other members. The sub-unit released the single "Whatta Man", which debuted at number two on the Gaon Digital Chart. Jeon and her band-mates received their first-ever music show win with the single on SBS MTV's The Show. On August 29, Jeon collaborated with I.O.I band-mates Choi Yoo-jung and Chungha and Ki Hui-hyeon of DIA on the digital single "Flower, Wind and You". It entered the Gaon Digital Chart at number 48. In October, Jeon was selected as the new host for The Show, paired with singer Wooshin of UP10TION.

On January 9, 2017, it was confirmed that Jeon signed a formal contract with JYP Entertainment for her solo activities on television. The agency however, revealed they had yet to decide what path her future held. Jeon's activities with I.O.I soon ended following its disbandment on January 29, 2017. Shortly afterward, she joined the second installation of Sister's Slam Dunk as a regular cast member. On March 9, Eric Nam and Jeon released a collaborative digital single titled "You, Who?". The single charted at number 16 on the Gaon Digital Chart. On May 12, Jeon joined Unnies, a project group created by the production team of Sister's Slam Dunk 2. The group released the singles "Right?" and "Lalala Song". Upon release, the digital singles debuted at numbers two and 48, respectively, on the Gaon Digital Chart and numbers 10 and 22, respectively, on the Billboard World Digital Song Sales chart. "Right?" sold over 950,000 digital copies by the year's end.

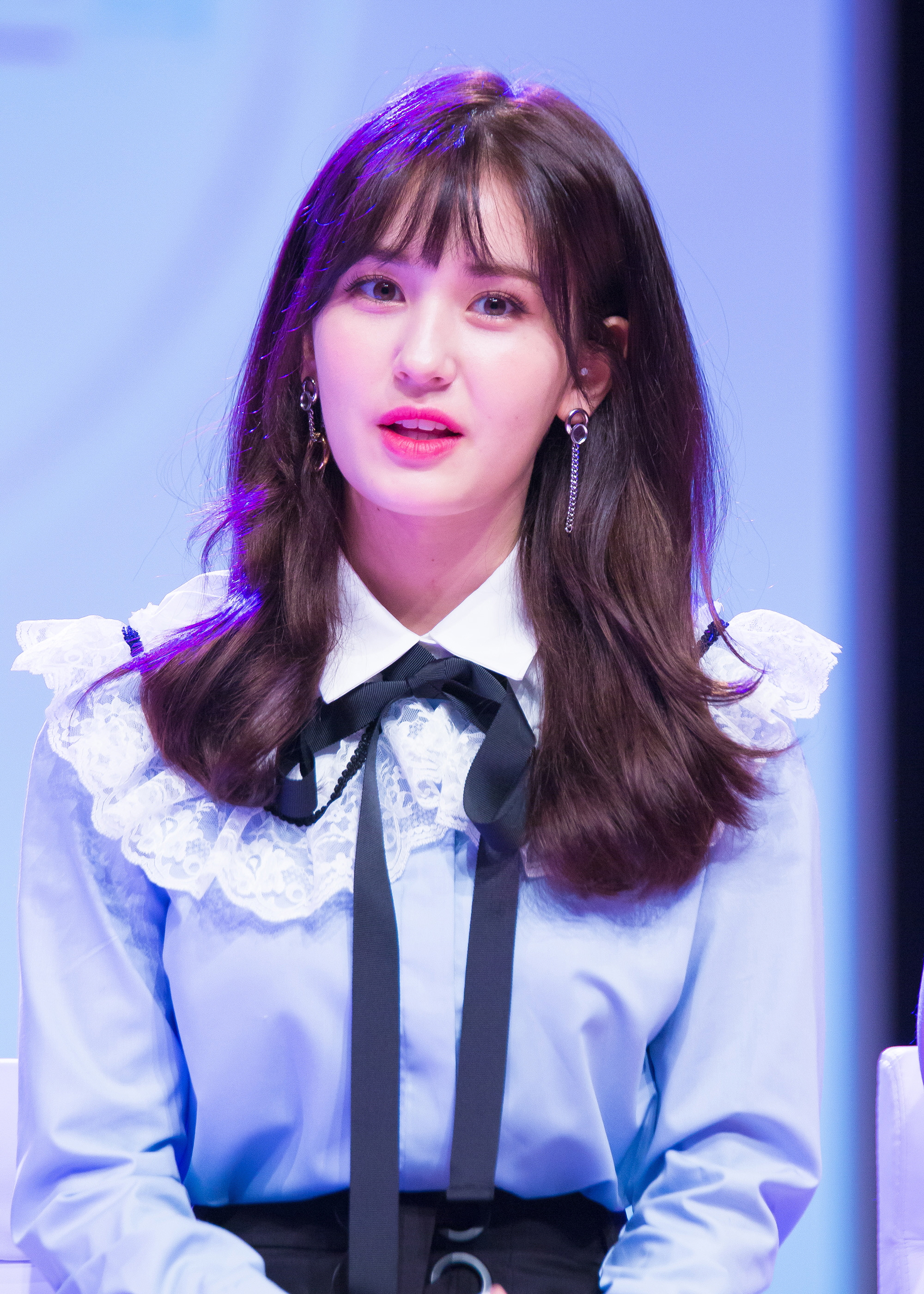
Jeon in June 2017

On March 28, 2017, Jeon joined the KBS web entertainment program Idol Drama Operation Team. On the show, she and six other girl group members worked together to write their own drama series, Let's Only Walk the Flower Road, becoming accredited scriptwriters as well as acting in the series as fictional versions of themselves in a girl group. Final filming for the show took place on May 9. The seven cast members formed a project girl group called Girls Next Door and released a single as part of the show's soundtrack. The song, "Deep Blue Eyes", was co-written and co-composed by B1A4's Jinyoung and made available on June 14 through Warner Music Korea. The group held their debut stage on July 14 at Music Bank. In November 2017, Jeon featured on the digital single "Nov to Feb" by label-mate senior Jun. K of 2PM and performed the song in the special broadcast Jun.K X Rooftop Live on V Live.

=== 2018–present: Solo debut and mainstream success ===
On August 20, 2018, Jeon departed JYP Entertainment, terminating her contract with the agency following a formal discussion and mutual agreement. The following month, she signed an exclusive contract with YG Entertainment's independent subsidiary label The Black Label, home to South Korean R&B singer Zion.T. Jeon revealed she joined the label soon after her meeting with CEO Teddy Park, citing his authenticity and feeling of content while imagining future plans for her as reasons. In addition, Jeon believed The Black Label would aid and allow her to focus on her growth both as an artist and a person, which aligned with her interests, in contrast with the constant promotions and releases often seen in the industry.

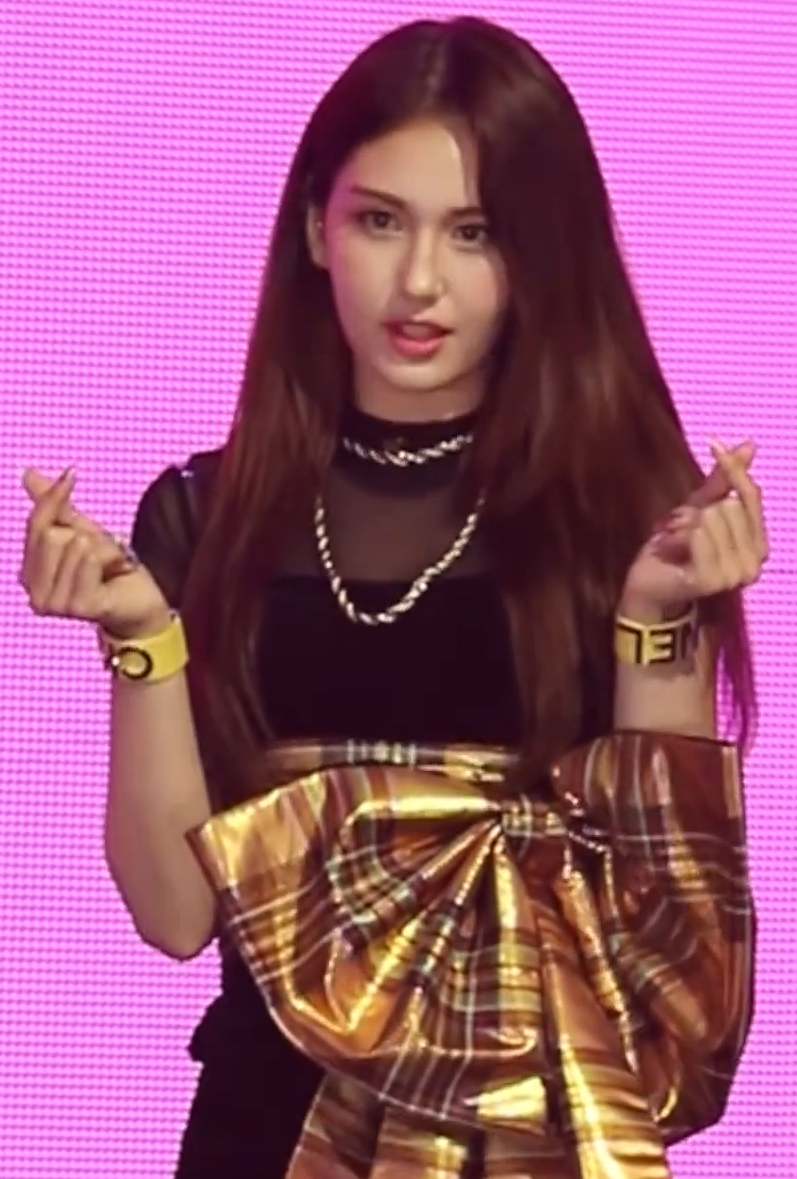
Jeon at her debut showcase for "Birthday" in 2019

On February 25, 2019, The Black Label revealed Jeon was preparing to make her debut as a solo artist with a lead single produced by Teddy. Her debut single "Birthday" was released on June 13 with an accompanying music video that surpassed four million views in 24 hours on YouTube. 18-year-old Jeon made her broadcast debut as a soloist on Show! Music Core, performing both "Birthday" and its B-side "Outta My Head" on June 15. The singles entered the Billboard World Digital Songs Chart at numbers five and nine, respectively, while "Birthday" peaked at numbers 22 and 18 on the Gaon Digital Chart and Billboard Korea K-pop 100, respectively. The lead single was also used in the trailer for Nora From Queens starring Awkwafina. Jeon soon joined the cast for Law of the Jungle in Chuuk with her father and Lose If You're Envious as one of the panelists of hosts.

On March 28, 2020, the reality series I Am Somi, was released on The Black Label's YouTube channel, a vlogging series on Jeon's life. In the sixth episode, Jeon revealed that her next release had been delayed and the series cut short due to travelling restrictions related to the coronavirus pandemic. On July 14, it was confirmed that Jeon would make her comeback on July 22 with a new single titled "What You Waiting For". On July 20, in conjunction with the release of "What You Waiting For", Jeon signed with Interscope Records and Universal Music Group for representation outside of Asia. On August 6, 2020, Jeon won her first music show trophy with "What You Waiting For" on Mnet's M Countdown.

On March 1, 2021, Jeon was invited by The Blue House to commemorate the 102nd anniversary of the Korean Declaration of Independence. The ceremony was held at Tapgol Park in Jongno District, Seoul and attended by President of South Korea, Moon Jae-in. She recited a reading from the March 1 Declaration of Independence alongside foreign activist descendants, entirely in the Korean language. The Blue House revealed they selected Jeon as a multicultural representative for her popularity as an idol promoting Korean content worldwide. Jeon and most members of I.O.I reunited on their fifth debut anniversary with the livestream special Yes, I Love It! on May 4; only members Kyulkyung and Mina were absent.

On July 23, Jeon was revealed to release a new single, "Dumb Dumb", on August 2. Its music video garnered 10 million views in under 24 hours on YouTube and 20 million views in two days, both personal records. The release peaked at numbers eight and nine on the Gaon Digital Chart and the Billboard Korea K-pop 100 respectively, marking her first top ten single as a soloist. "Dumb Dumb" also became her first chart entry in the Billboard Global Excl. U.S., debuting at number 130. In commemoration of the release, Jeon initiated a "Dumb Dumb Challenge" on TikTok, where the hashtag gained over 70 million views in two weeks and exceeded 122.7 million views the next day.

On October 14, 2021, The Black Label confirmed that Jeon would release her first full-length album, XOXO, and its lead single of the same name on October 29. The digitally-released singles "Birthday", "Outta My Head", "What You Waiting For" and "Dumb Dumb" were among the tracks on the album. The album went on to debut at number six on the Gaon Album Chart and sold 55,223 copies in the month of November. Lead single "XOXO" peaked at number 43 on the Gaon Digital Chart and became her first chart entry in the Billboard Global 200 at number 185.

On July 24, 2023, Jeon announced that she would be releasing a new extended play album Game Plan in August. The EP was released August 7, with the lead single "Fast Forward". The song was a commercial and critical success, peaking at number 5 on South Korea's Circle Digital Chart, and being named as one of the best K-pop songs of 2023 by Dazed and Business Insider. On December 12, 2023, Jeon released the special Christmas single "Ex-Mas" in collaboration with rapper Big Naughty.

On August 2, 2024, Jeon released the summer special single "Ice Cream".

On July 7, 2025, Jeon released the single "Extra". On July 21, The Black Label announced Jeon would release her second EP, Chaotic and Confused on August 11, 2025, with the track list revealed on July 30.

== Personal life ==
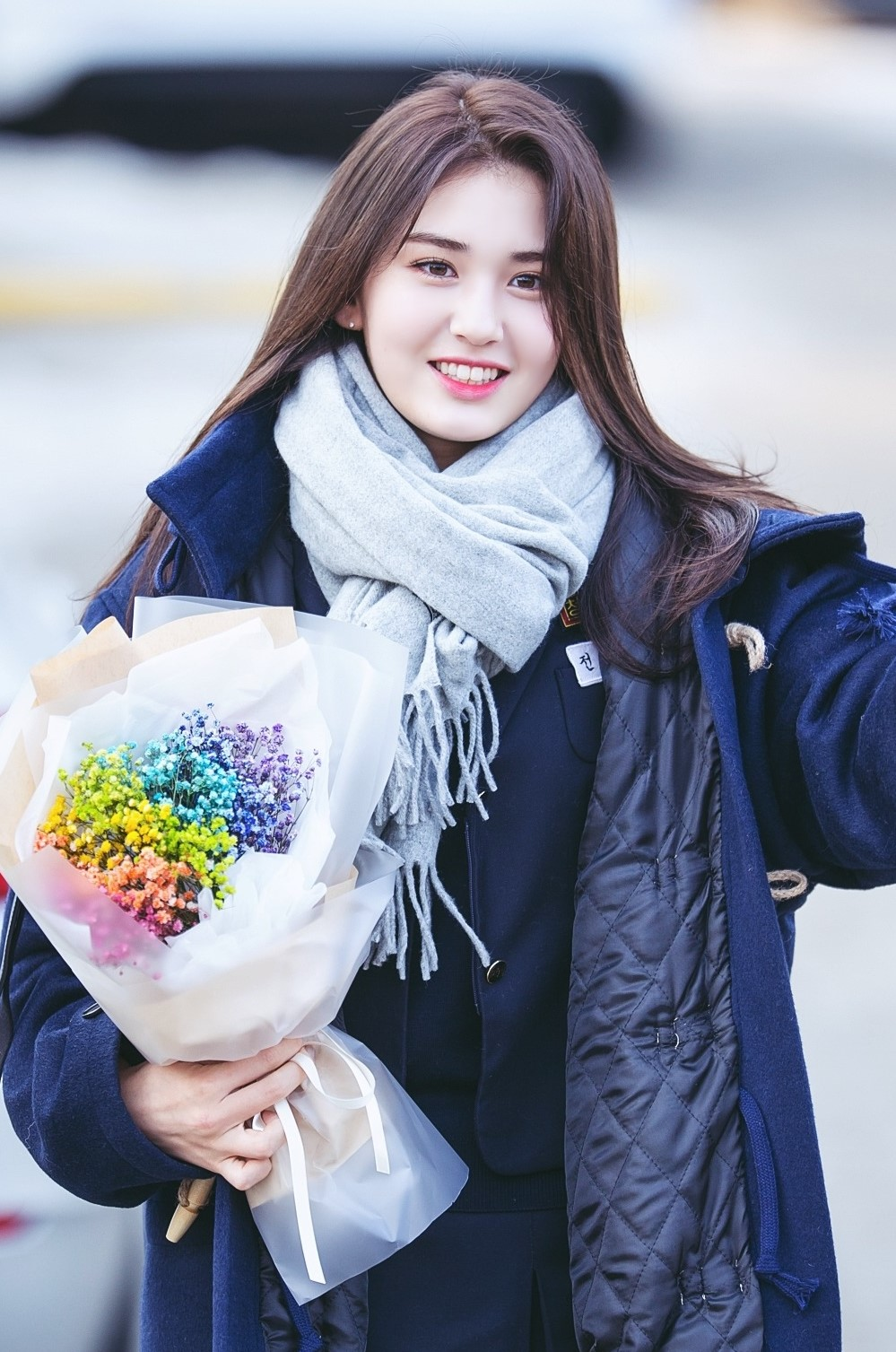
Jeon at her graduation ceremony in 2017

Jeon is accredited in Taekwondo, having practiced the Korean martial art for over 10 years and taught initially by her father, who himself achieved a fourth degree black belt. She held a third-degree black belt for some time but could not gain the fourth degree due to her young age. On May 30, 2018, 17-year-old Jeon partook in the fourth degree black belt examination held by Kukkiwon, wherein her skills qualified for the promotion. After she reached age of majority in South Korea, she applied for the conversion in dan and was officially certified as a fourth degree black belt holder, the level of an instructor qualified to run and manage a dojang.

Jeon and her family practice Korean Buddhism. She has stated that she holds three passports to South Korea, Canada and the Netherlands.

== Artistry ==
=== Fashion and style ===
As a child, Jeon enjoyed expressing herself through clothes and fashion. Her personality extended to her own style, including a Louis Vuitton bag she customized with a drawing of a unicorn, which she believed resembles herself. Jeon commented, "I like monogram patterns and colors. When I think of the monogram bag my mother carried about 10 years ago, I still think it's cool." For her single "What You Waiting For", Jeon was involved in the planning and styling process for her music video and worked closely with Serian, the current director of Vogue Korea. She selected looks portraying confidence and chose to wield a sword in the video to complete the "badass" look, with a hidden meaning relating to her birth name "Ennik", which means "sword" in Old Dutch/Old Frisian. Jeon also often invests her time in DIY projects, enjoying taking clothing apart, putting the pieces back together, tearing them apart again, and repeating the process again as part of her experiments.

=== Songwriting ===
"Outta My Head" (2019)
"Outta My Head" is a mid-tempo R&B b-side track from the debut single album, Birthday, which marked her first-ever self-composition and embarked her role as a singer songwriter.

Jeon began songwriting in her third year in middle school. Her first self-composed release, "Outta My Head" (어질어질), was written while promoting as a member of I.O.I. She was casually humming the tune following her move to The Black Label, and Teddy asked if she had come up with it. With encouragement and help from in-house producer 24, the initially bright melody turned into a mid-tempo R&B song and was included on her debut single album, Birthday.

Jeon usually records two versions of songs she writes, each in a different language. After grasping the "feel" of the song in English, the lyrics are changed to Korean. She explained, "For example, if the lyric is 'orange', it will be changed to 'how long' (in Korean), making similar pronunciations". The original lyrics to the hook of her single "Dumb Dumb" were "Imma say it like it is / cut the bullsh*t / you dumb dumb"; in the official version, they have been translated to Korean. Jeon attributed the longer wait between comebacks to this recording process and vouched it improves the result.

As a soloist under The Black Label, Jeon has gained greater artistic and creative control over her music and career. She stated, "There are a lot of great producers, songwriters, creatives and people I truly respect here. I've matured both professionally and personally a lot by learning from them and seeing how they do things up close. But there is still a lot to go. I'm still definitely learning". She credits Teddy as an important mentor in her growth as a songwriter: "Every songwriter and producer has their own way to express themselves artistically and Teddy is helping me to find my own way."

=== Influences ===
During her childhood, Jeon's favorite musicians were Cyndi Lauper, Rihanna, and 2NE1. Growing up, Jeon also listened to the music of South Korean singer Seo Taiji, whom she described as an artist who "rocked the music industry", thanks to her mother's influence. Jeon also credited her father for introducing music from various countries and listened to music on cassette tapes because of her grandmother. Jeon also cites Lee Hyori as a role model in her career as a female soloist; Lee showcased multiple different concepts throughout her career, ranging from mature to bright, which Jeon views as an inspiration for her own image as an artist. 1TYM leader and CEO of The Black Label, Teddy Park, was another key mentor and influence named by Jeon. She shared that "Teddy is without a doubt, the most successful songwriting and composing figure in K-pop, period. Period. When I first saw him, it was like seeing a unicorn up close [...] I was in awe because growing up I used to listen to his music and dream of becoming a singer [...] One piece of advice Teddy gave me was to not only just focus on being a great singer and musician, but also focus on being a great person and that's what I exactly aim to be."

== Other ventures ==
=== Endorsements ===
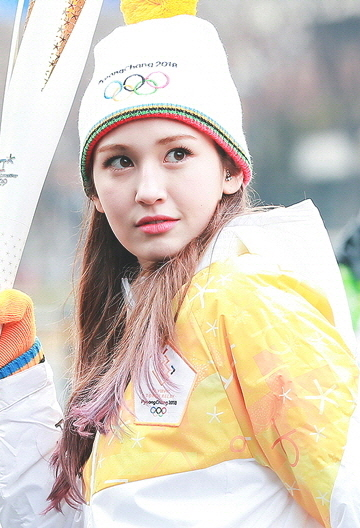
Jeon in 2018 as a torchbearer for the 2018 Winter Olympics

Her time as an I.O.I member contributed to her "Human Vitamin" image, which is also often referenced as one of many reasons she was considered for the endorsement offers she has received. She became the muse for Japanese skincare brand Hada Labo and cosmetics brands Kiss Me and Shiseido Korea, where she was also appointed as brand ambassador. Jeon also became a model for skincare brand COSRX. She has since become a brand spokesperson for ABC Mart's shoe brand Nuovo and was selected as an endorsement model for Beanpole Sports and fashion brand United Colors of Benetton Korea. In February 2022, she became the brand ambassador for Converse. In May 2023, she became an ambassador for The North Face. Outside of the beauty and fashion industries, Jeon was selected as a model for Nongshim's snack Petit Paris Rollbread and hangover product HK inno.N. Jeon has also been invited to participate in campaigns for Fanta, Reebok (Classic SS18 campaign, "Always Classic"), Louis Vuitton (2021 Eyewear Global Campaign), and Prada's Eternal Gold line.

In October 2021, Jeon became the public relation ambassador of Ministry of Culture, Sports and Tourism and participated in "Korea Contents Week" campaign.

=== Philanthropy ===
In July 2016, Jeon alongside I.O.I bandmates Nayoung and Kyulkyung, collaborated with "Shoot For Love", a campaign organized by Be Kind Organization in cooperation with the Korea Leukemia and Pediatric Cancer Association, to raise awareness and funds for children diagnosed with pediatric cancer. The trio successfully completed the missions provided and raised ₩1 million. In October 2018, she became the international ambassador of The Wetskills Foundation, a Dutch non-governmental organization focused on water management. In October 2020, Jeon, with other prominent personalities, participated in W Korea's "Love Your W", a campaign to raise awareness of breast cancer.

== Discography ==
=== Studio albums ===
List of studio albums, showing selected details, selected chart positions, and sales figures
Title	Details	Peak chart positions		Sales
Title	Details	KOR	US World	Sales
XOXO	Released: October 29, 2021; Label: The Black Label, Interscope; Formats: CD, digital download, streaming	6	14	KOR: 58,933

=== Extended plays ===
List of extended plays, showing selected details, selected chart positions, and sales figures
Title	Details	Peak chart positions	Sales
Title	Details	KOR	Sales
Game Plan	Released: August 7, 2023; Label: The Black Label, Interscope; Formats: CD, digital download, streaming; Track listing: 1. "Gold Gold Gold" (금금금); 2. "Fast Forward"; 3. "Fxxked Up" (개별로); 4. "Pisces" (자두); 5. "The Way"	9	KOR: 66,355
Chaotic & Confused	Released: August 11, 2025; Label: The Black Label, Interscope; Formats: CD, digital download, streaming; Track listing: 1. "Escapade"; 2. "Extra"; 3. "Chaotic & Confused"; 4. "Closer"; 5. "Delu"	17	KOR: 28,653

=== Singles ===
==== As lead artist ====
List of singles as lead artist, showing year released, selected chart positions, sales figures, and name of the album
Title	Year	Peak chart positions							Sales	Album
Title	Year	KOR	KOR Billb. (Note: The Billboard K-pop Hot 100 chart launched in 2011 and was discontinued in July 16, 2014. On the issue dated May 29 – June 4, 2017, the chart was re-established.)	MLY	NZ Hot	SGP	US World	WW (Note: The Billboard Global 200 chart launched and was first issued on the date September 19, 2020.)	Sales	Album
"Flower, Wind and You" (꽃, 바람 그리고 너) (with Ki Hui-hyeon, Choi Yoo-jung and Chungha)	2016	42	—	—	—	—	—	—	KOR: 38,862	Non-album singles
"You, Who?" (유후) (with Eric Nam)	2017	16	—	—	—	—	—	—	KOR: 191,765	Non-album singles
"Birthday"	2019	22	18	20	28	— (Note: "Birthday" did not enter the RIAS Top Streaming Chart, but peaked at number 8 on the regional chart.)	5	—	US: 1,000	XOXO
"What You Waiting For"	2020	53	33	8	38	4	8	—	—N/a	XOXO
"Dumb Dumb"	2021	8	9	—	—	24	5	— (Note: "Dumb Dumb" did not enter the Billboard Global 200, but peaked at number 130 on the Excl. U.S. chart.)	—N/a	XOXO
"XOXO"	2021	43	33	17	24	15	9	185	—N/a	XOXO
"Fast Forward"	2023	5	5	—	24	24	10	145	—N/a	Game Plan
"Ex-Mas" (with Big Naughty)	2023	— (Note: "Ex-Mas did not enter the Circle Digital Chart, but peaked at number 81 on the component Circle Download Chart.)	—	—	—	—	—	—	—N/a	Non-album singles
"Ice Cream"	2024	157	—	—	—	—	—	—	—N/a	Non-album singles
"Extra"	2025	134	—	—	—	—	—	—	—N/a	Chaotic & Confused
"Closer"	2025	102	—	—	—	—	—	—	—N/a	Chaotic & Confused
"—" denotes releases that did not chart or were not released in that region.

==== As featured artist ====
List of singles as featured artist, showing year released and album name
Title	Year	Album
"Nov to Feb" (Jun. K featuring Jeon Somi)	2017	My 20's

=== Other charted songs ===
List of other charted songs, showing year released, selected chart positions, and name of the album
Title	Year	Peak chart positions		Album
Title	Year	KOR Down.	US World	Album
"Outta My Head" (어질어질)	2019	198	9	XOXO
"Don't Let Me Go" (featuring Giriboy)	2021	125	—	XOXO
"Anymore"	2021	130	—	XOXO
"Watermelon"	2021	150	—	XOXO
"Gold Gold Gold" (금금금)	2023	80	—	Game Plan
"Fxxked Up" (개별로)	2023	41	—	Game Plan
"Pisces" (자두)	2023	72	—	Game Plan
"The Way"	2023	55	—	Game Plan
"Escapade"	2025	72	—	Chaotic & Confused
"Chaotic & Confused"	2025	77	—	Chaotic & Confused
"Delu"	2025	90	—	Chaotic & Confused
"—" denotes releases that did not chart or were not released in that region.

=== Songwriting credits ===
All song credits are adapted from the Korea Music Copyright Association's database unless stated otherwise.

List of songs, showing year released, artist name, and name of the album
Year	Artist	Song	Album	Lyricist		Composer	
Year	Artist	Song	Album	Credited	With	Credited	With
2017	Unnies	"Right?" (맞지?)	Non-album single	Yes	Kim Eana	No	–
2019	Herself	"Birthday"	XOXO	No	–	Yes	Teddy, Bekuh Boom, 24
2019	Herself	"Outta My Head" (어질어질)	XOXO	Yes	–	Yes	24
2020	Herself	"What You Waiting For"	XOXO	Yes	Teddy, Danny Chung	Yes	Teddy, R.Tee, 24
2021	Herself	"Dumb Dumb"	XOXO	Yes	Teddy, Danny Chung	No	–
2021	Herself	"XOXO"	XOXO	Yes	Teddy, Danny Chung, Vince, Kush	Yes	Teddy, Danny Chung, Vince, Kush
2021	Herself	"Don't Let Me Go"	XOXO	Yes	Teddy, Danny Chung, Giriboy	No	–
2021	Herself	"Watermelon"	XOXO	Yes	–	Yes	24
2023	Herself	"Gold Gold Gold" (금금금)	Game Plan	Yes	Teddy, Danny Chung	Yes	Dominsuk, 24
2023	Herself	"Fast Forward"	Game Plan	Yes	Teddy, Bekuh Boom, Vince	No	–
2023	Herself	"Fxxked Up" (개별로)	Game Plan	Yes	Teddy	Yes	Teddy, 24, Dominsuk, JuniorChef, VVN
2023	Herself	"Pisces" (자두)	Game Plan	Yes	–	Yes	Dominsuk
2023	Herself and Big Naughty	"Ex-Mas"	Non-album single	Yes	Big Naughty	Yes	NOHC, Vince, Big Naughty
2025	Herself	"Escapade"	Chaotic & Confused	Yes	Teddy, B.I.	Yes	Dominsuk, Teddy
2025	Herself	"Extra"	Chaotic & Confused	Yes	Teddy, Vince, Jo Yoon-kyung, Hwang Yu-bin (XYXX), Alna Hofmeyr, Josh Allen, Shae Jacobs	No	–
2025	Herself	"Chaotic & Confused"	Chaotic & Confused	Yes	Teddy, Johan Carlsson, Elvira Anderfjärd, Andrew Luce, B.I., Mudd the Student	No	–
2025	Herself	"Delu"	Chaotic & Confused	Yes	Vince	Yes	Dominsuk, Vince
2026	I.O.I	"IOI (Where My Girls At)"	I.O.I: Loop	Yes	–	Yes	Dominsuk
2026	I.O.I	"갑자기"	I.O.I: Loop	Yes	VVN	No	–

== Videography ==
=== Music videos ===
Year	Title	Director(s)	Ref.
2016	"Yum-Yum" (얌얌)	Unknown	(Note: CJ CheilJedang's Alaska Salmon Commercial M/V)
2017	"You, Who?" (유후) (with Eric Nam)	Unknown	
2019	"Birthday"	Unknown	
2020	"What You Waiting For"	Hobin	
2021	"Dumb Dumb"	Han Sa-min	
2021	"XOXO"	Han Sa-min	
2021	"Anymore"	Han Sa-min	
2023	"Fast Forward"	Han Sa-min	
2023	"Gold Gold Gold"	Han Sa-min	
2024	"Ice Cream"	Sunghwi (nvrmnd)	
2025	"Extra"	Rima Yoon (Rigend Film)	
2025	"Closer"	Yunah Sheep	

== Filmography ==
=== Film ===
Year	Title	Role	Notes	Ref.
2014	Ode to My Father	Mak-soon Yoon's eldest daughter	Cameo appearance	
TBA	Perfect Girl †	TBA	Filming	

=== Television shows ===
Year	Title	Role	Notes	Ref.
2015	Sixteen	Contestant	Survival show Finished 11th	
2016	Produce 101	Contestant	Survival show; formation of I.O.I; Finished 1st	
2016	Battle Trip	Traveler	Episode 12 (with Zhou Jieqiong)	
2017	Sister's Slam Dunk Season 2	Cast member	—N/a	
2017	Idol Drama Operation Team	Cast member	—N/a	(Note: Idol Drama Operation Team premiered on May 29, 2017, via Naver TV Cast and Naver V Live. It was then broadcast on KBS Joy and KBS World channel every Mondays, Wednesdays and Fridays, starting June 10.)
2017	I Can See Your Voice	Detective	Season 4 (Episode 4–5)	
2019	Not the Same Person You Used to Know	Protagonist	Season 2 (Episode 1)	
2019	Law of the Jungle in Chuuk	Cast member	Episodes 393–397	
2020	Lose If You're Envious (부러우면 지는거다)	Cast member	Dating reality show	
2020	I Am Somi (아이 엠 소미)	Herself	Reality documentary series	
2023	Boys Planet	Star master	Episode 11	
2025	Street Food Bikers	Cast Member	Cooking-themed variety show	

=== Web shows ===
Year	Title	Role	Notes	Ref.
2022	Your Daily Life	Host	TikTok Stage On Air	
2023	Yes or Hot (예스 오아 핫)	Host	Pilot show	

=== Hosting ===
Year	Title	Notes	Ref.
2016–2017	The Show	with Kim Woo-seok	
2017	26th Seoul Music Awards	with Kim Hee-chul and Tak Jae-hoon	
2018	Produce 48	Episode 1 (with Kang Daniel)	
2018	Music Bank World Tour: Berlin	with Park Bo-gum	
2020	Unite On: Live Concert	with Choi Bo-min	
2021	Inkigayo	with Jihoon and Sungchan of NCT	
2021	SBS 2021 Super Concert In Daegu	with YooA and Yunho	
2022	2022 MAMA Awards	Night 1	
2023	2023 MAMA Awards	Night 1	

=== Music video appearances ===
Year	Title	Artist	Ref.
2014	"Stop Stop It" (하지하지마)	Got7	
2016	"White Night" (하얗게 불태웠어)	Up10tion	

== Live performances ==
Fanmeeting tours

Title	Date	City	Country	Venue	Ref.
Jeon Somi Fanmeeting [CHAOS] 2025	July 19, 2025	Seoul	South Korea	Hyundai Card UNDERSTAGE	
Jeon Somi Fanmeeting [CHAOS] 2025	August 1, 2025	Tokyo	Japan	Tachikawa Stage Garden	
Jeon Somi Fanmeeting [CHAOS] 2025	August 3, 2025	Osaka	Japan	NHK Osaka Hall	

== Awards and nominations ==
Name of the award ceremony, year presented, award category, nominee(s) of the award, and the result of the nomination
Award ceremony	Year	Category	Nominee(s) / Work(s)	Result	Ref.
Allure Korea Best Of Beauty	2024	Makeup	GLYF	Won	
Asia Artist Awards	2021	Popularity Award – Singer (Female)	Jeon Somi	Nominated	
Asia Artist Awards	2023	Popularity Award – Singer (Female)	Jeon Somi	Nominated	
Asian Pop Music Awards (Note: Hosted by the Hong Kong Asia Pacific International Group and Sunway Records, the Asian Pop Music Awards bases its winners on the "Asian Pop Music Chart" which opened in September 2019.)	2021	Best Female Artist (Overseas)	Jeon Somi	Won	
Asian Pop Music Awards	2021	Top 20 Songs of the Year (Overseas)	"Dumb Dumb"	Won	
Asian Pop Music Awards	2021	Top 20 Albums of the Year (Overseas)	XOXO	Won	
Asian Pop Music Awards	2021	Best Album of the Year (Overseas)	XOXO	Nominated	
Asian Pop Music Awards	2021	Best Dance Performance (Overseas)	"Dumb Dumb"	Nominated	
Asian Pop Music Awards	2021	Best Music Video (Overseas)	"XOXO"	Nominated	
Asian Pop Music Awards	2021	Record of the Year (Overseas)	"XOXO"	Nominated	
Asian Pop Music Awards	2021	Song of the Year (Overseas)	"Dumb Dumb"	Nominated	
Circle Chart Music Awards	2022	Artist of the Year – Digital Music (August)	"Dumb Dumb"	Nominated	
Circle Chart Music Awards	2022	Mubeat Global Choice Award – Female	Jeon Somi	Nominated	
Circle Chart Music Awards	2024	Mubeat Global Choice Award – Female	Jeon Somi	Nominated	
The Fact Music Awards	2023	Best Music (Fall)	"Fast Forward"	Nominated	
Genie Music Awards	2019	The Female New Artist	Jeon Somi	Nominated	
Golden Disc Awards	2022	Best Performance	Jeon Somi	Won	
Golden Disc Awards	2022	Best Digital Song (Bonsang)	"Dumb Dumb"	Nominated	
Golden Disc Awards	2022	Seezn Most Popular Artist Award	Jeon Somi	Nominated	
Hanteo Music Awards	2021	Artist Award (Female Solo)	Jeon Somi	Nominated	
Joox Malaysia Music Awards	2022	Top 5 K-Pop Hits	"Dumb Dumb"	Won	
Korea First Brand Awards (Note: Hosted by the Korea Consumer Brand Committee and the Korea Consumer Forum, the Korea First Brand Awards bases its winners on a nationwide South Korean survey.)	2018	CF Model	Jeon Somi	Won	
Korea First Brand Awards	2022	Female Solo Singer	Jeon Somi	Won	
Korea First Brand Awards	2026	Female Solo Singer	Jeon Somi	Won	
MAMA Awards	2019	Artist of the Year	Jeon Somi	Longlisted	
MAMA Awards	2019	Best New Female Artist	Jeon Somi	Nominated	
MAMA Awards	2019	Qoo10 Favorite Female Artist	Jeon Somi	Nominated	
MAMA Awards	2019	Worldwide Fans' Choice Top 10	Jeon Somi	Nominated	
MAMA Awards	2021	Best Dance Performance Solo	"Dumb Dumb"	Nominated	
MAMA Awards	2021	Song of the Year	"Dumb Dumb"	Longlisted	
MAMA Awards	2021	Worldwide Fans' Choice Top 10	Jeon Somi	Nominated	
MAMA Awards	2023	Album of the Year	Game Plan	Longlisted	
MAMA Awards	2023	Artist of the Year	Jeon Somi	Longlisted	
MAMA Awards	2023	Best Dance Performance Female Solo	"Fast Forward"	Nominated	
MAMA Awards	2023	Best Female Artist	Jeon Somi	Nominated	
MAMA Awards	2023	Song of the Year	"Fast Forward"	Longlisted	
MAMA Awards	2023	Worldwide Fans' Choice Top 10	Jeon Somi	Nominated	
Melon Music Awards	2019	Hot Trend Award	Jeon Somi	Nominated	
Mubeat Awards	2020	Best Female Solo	Jeon Somi	Won	
Seoul Music Awards	2020	Dance Performance Award	"Birthday"	Nominated	
Seoul Music Awards	2022	Bonsang Award	"Dumb Dumb"	Nominated	
Seoul Music Awards	2022	K-Wave Award	Jeon Somi	Nominated	
Seoul Music Awards	2022	Popularity Award	Jeon Somi	Nominated	
Seoul Music Awards	2024	Bonsang Award	Game Plan	Nominated	
Seoul Music Awards	2024	K-Wave Award	Game Plan	Nominated	
Seoul Music Awards	2024	Popularity Award	Game Plan	Nominated	
