= Lovesick (EP) =

- Digital cover

EP by Chaeryeong
- Released: November 9, 2026
- Length: 12:32
- Languages: Korean; English
- Label: JYP

Singles from Lovesick
- 1. "Lovesick" Released: November 9, 2026

Lovesick is the debut extended play by South Korean singer Chaeryeong of the girl group Itzy. The four-track EP was released by JYP Entertainment on November 9, 2026, alongside its single "Lovesick".

== Background and release ==
On August 27, 2026, JTBC reported that Chaeryeong would release an album during the month of November that same year, becoming the third member of Itzy to release music as a soloist, following Yeji with Air (2025) and Yuna with Ice Cream (2026). On October 19, JYP Entertainment announced that Chaeryeong's debut solo extended play, Lovesick, would be released on November 9. The agency also released a promotional trailer, schedule, and the EP's track listing that day. The music video teasers for "Lovesick" were released on November 1 and 3. An album spoiler video was released on November 6.

== Composition ==
The title track, "Lovesick", is a pop track with lyrics about confusion and the "dreamy feeling of being helplessly in love".

== Track listing ==
Lovesick track listing
No.	Title	Lyrics	Music	Arrangement	Length
1.	"Lovesick"	Choi Si-yu; Wang Se-yun	Monster No.9; Jonna Hall	Monster No.9	3:04
2.	"Moonlit Club"	Ban Ye-ji	Shim Eun-ji; Lee Hae-sol; Adora	Lee Hae-sol	3:14
3.	"Scent"	Kwon Ye-rim; Hong Ra-im	Seora; Honeysweat; Lee Hyo-min; Seong Ji-woo	Honeysweat; Seong Ji-woo	2:49
4.	"Favorite Reason"	Chaeryeong; Lee Yeon	Young Chance; Rebbi James; Rollie; Josefin Glenmark	Rollie	3:25
Total length:					12:32

== Charts ==
Weekly chart performance for Lovesick
Chart (2026)	Peak position
Japanese Digital Albums (Oricon)	44
South Korean Albums (Circle)	14

== Release history ==
Release dates and formats
Region	Date	Format	Label
South Korea	November 9, 2026	CD	JYP
Various	November 9, 2026	Download; streaming	JYP
