= My Bias, My Boss =

2026 South Korean television series

- Promotional poster
- Hangul: 최애의 사원
- Hanja: 最愛의 社員
- Lit.: Favorite Employee
- RR: Choeaeui sawon
- MR: Ch'oeaeŭi sawŏn
- Genre: Workplace; Romantic comedy; Coming-of-age
- Based on: My Bias, My Boss by Seong Eun
- Written by: Lee Young; Kim Ji-an
- Directed by: Park Ji-hyun
- Starring: Kang Hoon; Kim Hye-jun; Cha Woo-min
- No. of episodes: 12

Production
- Running time: 70 minutes
- Production companies: Studio Dragon; Studio N; Npio Entertainment

Original release
- Network: tvN
- Release: August 3 – September 8, 2026

My Bias, My Boss (Korean: 최애의 사원) was a 2026 South Korean workplace romantic comedy television series written by Lee Young and Kim Ji-an, directed by Park Ji-hyun, and starring Kang Hoon, Kim Hye-jun, and Cha Woo-min. Based on the Naver webtoon of the same name by Seong Eun, the series depicts the story of new employee Nam Da-reum, who tries to meet her bias but ends up becoming her boss's favorite employee. It aired on tvN from August 3 to September 8, 2026, every Monday and Tuesday at 20:50 (KST). It is also available for streaming on Rakuten Viki in selected regions.

== Cast and characters ==
=== Main ===
- Kang Hoon as Kang Ha-gi

CEO of Appello Company. Despite assuming the CEO title at a young age, he built the fashion platform Appello from the ground up with grit and talent. Although he appears cold and strong, he has a warm heart. He initially suspected new employee Nam Da-reum of having an ulterior motive. But later, he fell for Da-reum, even though her heart was set on someone else. As love and friendship become entangled, the most unpredictable variable begins to disrupt his life.

- Kim Hye-jun as Nam Da-reum

New employee in Appello's marketing team. At age 17, she became a fan of Lee Chan, a member of the idol group D.N.X, following an unexpected encounter. For the subsequent 12 years, she remained a dedicated supporter of Chan. She saw fandom as central to her life and credited it with helping her cope with loneliness, shaping her goals, and shaping who she became.

- Cha Woo-min as Lee Chan

A member of idol group D.N.X who is also active as an actor. Although he seems used to receiving affection, he does not understand what true love is. He has never learned how to love or how to hold onto it. Despite frequent dating rumors, his relationships have been short-lived, and he becomes clumsy when faced with genuine sincerity. Chan's attention is drawn to Da-reum. After discovering she has been a longtime fan of over 10 years, he becomes curious about her. That curiosity develops into gratitude and then into cautious affection. He senses that she has seen sides of him he did not know existed. Though he hopes this could be true love, their relationship encounters repeated difficulties.

=== Supporting ===
==== People around Da-reum ====
- Gong Ji-ho as Park Mi-mi

Da-reum's best friend. She was the first to approach Da-reum when she was being bullied, and the two grew close while fangirling over D.N.X together. Her honest and direct personality is both an asset and a flaw, as she tends to speak her mind to everyone. She turned her passion for fitness into a career and currently works as a Pilates instructor. She is frequently approached by men asking for her number.

- Kim Ah-young as Lee Seul-a

Da-reum's best friend and owner of a pilates centre. A fan of D.N.X since her teens, she has remained by Da-reum and Mi-mi's side. She is a key witness to Da-reum's past, knowing more about Da-reum's history than anyone else. After working three years at an IT company that left her with stress, drinking, and thinning hair, she resigned three months ago and opened a smart store in a corner of her studio apartment. Roy was her favorite member of D.N.X. She continues to quietly hope that her bias, who may be going through a difficult time, is still out there somewhere.

- Jang Hye-jin as Kim Mi-ja

Da-reum's mother. She runs a rice cake business and even put up banners to celebrate her daughter's acceptance into a major corporation. With a strong "fandom DNA" — she is active in a trot singer's fan club — she exemplifies the source of Da-reum's passion. She serves as a steady support system, enabling Da-reum to smile and persevere through her warm encouragement.

==== People around Chan ====
- Yoon Hyun-suk as Hyeok

The leader of D.N.X group.

- Baek Seung as Tae-oh

The main vocalist of D.N.X.

- Jung Hyun-min as Jinu

A rapper from D.N.X.

- Chun Woo-jin as Roy

The youngest member of D.N.X.

- Tae Hang-ho as Na Won-bin

Chan's manager.

- Yuna as Yoon Cho-yi

A rising actress who garnered praise for her on-screen chemistry with Lee Chan in the romance drama Bitter Sweet. Under Chan's guidance, she rehearsed extensively with him and developed genuine feelings for him while playing his on-screen romantic partner. The role also earned her the first critical acclaim of her career.

==== Others ====
- Nam Hyun-woo as Park Young-woo

New employee in the marketing team.

- Lee Dam-hee as Lee Min-ah

MD team new employee.

- Heo Jun-seok as Choi Sung-wook

Management Support Team Manager.

- Kim So-ra as Kim Mi-young

Marketing Team Manager.

- Kim Chae-eun as Seo Hye-soo

Marketing Team Assistant Manager.

- Song Jin-woo as Lee Jin-sang

Sales Team Manager.

- Hwang Jung-min as Cheon Seon-ae

Cleaning lady.

- Jang Hyuk-jin as Kim Han-cheol

Director at SE Mulsan.

==== Special appearances ====
- Lee Ga-eun as Do Eun-yeong

The journalist who wrote the attacking articles about Chan and Da-reum, obtained their information from Cho-yi

- Yeonwoo as Han Jeong-yeon

Ha-gi and Chan's senior from high school.

== Production ==
=== Development ===
The series is a collaborative project between production company Studio Dragon, Studio N, and Npio Entertainment. It is co-written by Lee Young and Kim Ji-an, and directed by Park Ji-hyun. It is based on the Naver Webtoon of the same title by Seong Eun, which has recorded over 660 million global views.

=== Casting ===
According to the broadcasting industry, Kang Hoon and Kim Hye-jun were cast as the series leads in July 2025. Two months later, Cha Woo-min joined the cast. Yuna, who previously made her acting debut in tvN's Undercover Miss Hong, joined the cast in November 2025 and participated in a script reading.

Official casting confirmation was reported on January 29, 2026.

=== Filming ===
Principal photography began in the second half of 2025.

== Release ==
My Bias, My Boss was scheduled to premiere on tvN in the second half of 2026. The series was confirmed to premiere on August 3, 2026, and airs on a Monday–Tuesday timeslot at 20:50 (KST). It is also available for streaming on Rakuten Viki in selected regions.

== Viewership ==
My Bias, My Boss : South Korea viewers per episode (thousands)

Season	Episode number												Average
Season	1	2	3	4	5	6	7	8	9	10	11	12	Average
1	994	710	968	785	1007	887	729	744	763	724	770	707	816

Source: Audience measurement performed nationwide by Nielsen Korea.

Average TV viewership ratings
Ep.	Original broadcast date	Average audience share (Nielsen Korea)	
Ep.	Original broadcast date	Nationwide	Seoul
1	August 3, 2026	4.226% (1st)	3.899% (1st)
2	August 4, 2026	3.143% (1st)	3.025% (1st)
3	August 10, 2026	3.870% (1st)	3.416% (1st)
4	August 11, 2026	3.558% (1st)	3.365% (1st)
5	August 17, 2026	4.007% (1st)	4.094% (1st)
6	August 18, 2026	3.626% (1st)	3.397% (1st)
7	August 24, 2026	3.165% (1st)	2.975% (1st)
8	August 25, 2026	3.361% (1st)	2.897% (1st)
9	August 31, 2026	3.510% (1st)	3.003% (2nd)
10	September 1, 2026	3.216% (2nd)	2.726% (2nd)
11	September 7, 2026	3.334% (2nd)	3.129% (2nd)
12	September 8, 2026	3.116% (2nd)	2.765% (2nd)
Average		3.511%	3.224%
In the table above, the blue numbers represent the lowest ratings and the red numbers represent the highest ratings.; This drama aired on a cable channel/pay TV which normally has a relatively smaller audience compared to free-to-air TV/public broadcasters (KBS, SBS, MBC, and EBS).
