= Gold (Itzy EP) =

- Digital cover

EP by Itzy
- Released: October 15, 2024
- Length: 33:55
- Language: Korean
- Labels: JYP; Republic

Itzy chronology
Born to Be (2024)	Gold (2024)	Girls Will Be Girls (2025)

Singles from Gold
- 1. "Gold" Released: October 15, 2024; 2. "Imaginary Friend" Released: October 28, 2024

Gold is the ninth extended play by South Korean girl group Itzy. It was released by JYP Entertainment and Republic Records on October 15, 2024, and contains 11 tracks, including the singles "Gold" and "Imaginary Friend" and five tracks from Born to Be (2024) re-recorded as a quintet. The EP marks the return of Lia to group activities following her health-related hiatus.

== Background ==
Itzy performed as a quartet from September 2023 to July 2024 while Lia took a hiatus to focus on her recovery from anxiety. During this time, they released and promoted the extended play Born to Be in January 2024, and the Japanese-language single "Algorhythm" in May 2024. Lia resumed her group activities on July 8, 2024, during a livestream for the group's fifth anniversary. JYP Entertainment confirmed that Itzy would be releasing their next album in October on the same day.

== Music and lyrics ==
=== Composition ===
We created this album with the determination to properly show our colors, encompassing all those feelings. We wanted to say that we are still different

— Yuna, during a showcase for the album

Gold consists of 11 tracks and has a runtime of 33 minutes and 56 seconds. The EP's tracks revolve around the motif "our world is still different" and aim to showcase the group's versatility. Itzy collaborated with producers Ryan S. Jhun and Dem Jointz, and lyricists Jo Yoon-kyung and Bang Hye-hyun in producing the record. Changbin of Stray Kids features on "Vay" and was listed as a writer for the track.

=== Songs ===
The EP opens with the pop-rock eponymous track, which showcases the group's signature energetic sound and features the electric guitar. "Imaginary Friend" explores a sweeter melody that contrasts with the band's past work, exploring an old school pop-style acoustic sound. "Bad Girls R Us" contains elements of country pop and jazz with "sassy" motifs. Chaeryeong highlights "Supernatural" for having a "mysterious and dreamy vibes". Yeji explained that "Five" expresses the group's bond from their "first meeting to the present", deeming it an integral part of the album.

The latter part of the album are re-recorded versions of "Born to Be", "Untouchable", "Mr. Vampire", "Dynamite", and "Escalator" from Born to Be (2024), which included Lia's vocals and were noted as "Final version".

== Release and promotion ==
Gold was released on October 15, 2024, alongside the singles "Gold" and "Imaginary Friend", as Itzy's ninth extended play.

The record's title and release date were announced on September 13, alongside the promotional schedule. The album's concept trailer was released on September 30. On October 7, the six new tracks for the album were previewed through a series of videos accompanied by instrumental snippets.

The music video teasers for "Gold" were released on October 9 and 11. Following the release of Gold, Itzy held a fan meeting on November 2 to support the album.

== Track listing ==
Track listing for Gold
No.	Title	Lyrics	Music	Arrangement	Length
1.	"Gold"	Ryan S. Jhun; Seon; Y0ung (MUMW); Eeeee	Ryan S. Jhun; Dem Jointz; Jen Decilveo; 8AE; Bailey Flores; Stan Greene	Ryan S. Jhun; Dem Jointz	3:07
2.	"Imaginary Friend"	Ryan S. Jhun	Ryan S. Jhun; James Daniel Lewis; Sorana Pacurar	Ryan S. Jhun; James Daniel Lewis; Jun Seo; Hwan Yang	3:22
3.	"Bad Girls R Us"	Jo Yoon-kyung	Jason Suwito; Alexandra Maria Veltri; Noémie Legrand	Jason Suwito	3:02
4.	"Supernatural"	Bang Hye-hyun; Moon Seol-ri	Jack Brady; Jordan Roman; Austin Wolfe; Sofia Quinn	The Wavys	3:08
5.	"Five"	Myung Hye-in (Inhouse); Song Yu (Inhouse)	Kobee (Melange/Inhouse); Holy M (Melange/Inhouse); Voll (Inhouse); Ezit (Inhouse); Arineh Karimi; Jonna Hall	Kobee (Melange/Inhouse); Holy M (Melange/Inhouse); Voll (Inhouse); Ezit (Inhouse)	3:21
6.	"Vay" (featuring Changbin of Stray Kids)	Changbin (3Racha)	Changbin (3Racha); Restart; Chae Kang-hae	Restart; Chae Kang-hae	2:41
7.	"Born to Be" (Final version)	Noday	Arineh Karimi; Gusten Dahlqvist	Gusten Dahlqvist	2:58
8.	"Untouchable" (Final version)	Bang Hye-hyun; Lee Seu-ran	Maria Marcus; Zarah Christenson; Tobias Näslund	Tobias Näslund	3:14
9.	"Mr. Vampire" (Final version)	Seo Ji-eum	Kobee (Melange/Inhouse); Holy M (Melange/Inhouse); Ezit (Inhouse); Noémie Legrand; Sofia Quinn	Melange (Inhouse); Ezit (Inhouse)	2:50
10.	"Dynamite" (Final version)	Noday	Kobee (Melange/Inhouse); Holy M (Melange/Inhouse); Voll (Inhouse); Noémie Legrand; Sofia Quinn	Melange (Inhouse); Voll (Inhouse)	2:49
11.	"Escalator" (Final version)	Lee Thor	G'harah 'PK' Degeddingseze; Tricia Battani	G'harah 'PK' Degeddingseze; Tricia Battani	3:20
Total length:					33:52

== Charts ==
=== Weekly charts ===
Weekly chart performance
Chart (2024)	Peak position
Belgian Albums (Ultratop Flanders)	45
Belgian Albums (Ultratop Wallonia)	116
Croatian International Albums (HDU)	9
Greek Albums (IFPI)	15
Hungarian Albums (MAHASZ)	30
Japanese Albums (Oricon)	12
Japanese Combined Albums (Oricon)	31
Japanese Hot Albums (Billboard Japan)	38
Polish Albums (ZPAV)	67
Portuguese Albums (AFP)	20
South Korean Albums (Circle)	3
US Billboard 200	60
US World Albums (Billboard)	3

=== Monthly charts ===
Monthly chart performance
Chart (2024)	Peak position
Japanese Albums (Oricon)	44
South Korean Albums (Circle)	3

=== Year-end charts ===
Year-end chart performance
Chart (2024)	Position
South Korean Albums (Circle)	34

== Certifications ==
Certifications
Region	Certification	Certified units/sales
South Korea (KMCA)	2× Platinum	500,000^{^}
^{^} Shipments figures based on certification alone.

== Release history ==
Release history
Region	Date	Format	Label
Various	October 15, 2024	Digital download; streaming	JYP; Republic
South Korea	October 15, 2024	CD	JYP; Republic
United States	October 25, 2024	CD	JYP; Republic
