= Untouchable (Itzy song) =

Single by Itzy

from the EP Born to Be
- Language: Korean
- Released: January 8, 2024
- Genre: Dance-pop; EDM
- Length: 3:14
- Label: JYP; Republic
- Composers: Maria Marcus; Zarah Christenson; Tobias Näslund
- Lyricists: Bang Hye-hyeon; Lee Seu-ran

Itzy singles chronology
"Ringo" (2023)	"Untouchable" (2024)	"Algorhythm" (2024)

Music video
- Untouchable on YouTube

"Untouchable" is a song recorded by the South Korean girl group Itzy for their eighth extended play, Born to Be (2024). It was released as the EP's lead single through JYP Entertainment on January 8, 2024. Written by Bang Hye-hyun and Lee Seu-ran, the track carries elements of dance-pop and EDM. Lyrically, "Untouchable" conveys a message of resilience in facing the hardships of reality.

== Background and release ==
On December 4, 2023, JYP Entertainment announced Itzy's eighth extended play, Born to Be, along with its tracklist, which listed "Untouchable" as the EP's lead single, marking its release for January 8, 2024, in conjunction with the EP's release. With the release date set amid Lia's hiatus, the single was recorded by the group as a quartet.

A snippet of the single's music video depicting the quartet performing in a straight-line formation was released as the single's first teaser on January 4, 2024. Another teaser was released the following day, depicting the members in coordinating all-black outfits, performing in a stage adorned in red lights.

"Untouchable" was re-released as part of the group's ninth EP Gold in October 2024. This version, dubbed the "Final Ver.", was recorded by the group as a quintet and features Lia's vocals.

== Composition ==
"Untouchable" was co-written by Bang Hye-hyun and Lee Seu-ran and co-composed by Maria Marcus, Zarah Christenson, and Tobias Näslund. A dance-pop EDM track driven by "strong guitar sounds", the song expresses one's resilience in combatting the hardships of reality in its lyrics. It features "extremely addictive refrains" supported by an "electrifying groove" throughout its runtime of three minutes and 14 seconds. The song was written in the key of C minor and carries an average tempo of 105 bpm.

== Accolades ==
On South Korea music programs, "Untouchable" achieved a first place win on the January 19 episode of Music Bank in 2024.

Program	Date	Ref.
Music Bank	January 19, 2024	

== Music video ==
The music video was released in conjunction with the EP on January 8, 2024. The visual depicts the members "strutting into the spotlight" while being surrounded by a "wall of soldiers holding up riot shields", as they perform "dynamic choreography" as their weapon. Azrin Tan of Vogue Singapore posited that the visual presents a "mature" image of the group, noting the song's "slick" choreography and the styling of the members for the video. The video culminates in the quartet causing an explosion once the soldiers close in the group, as they continue performing.

== Charts ==
=== Weekly charts ===
Weekly chart performance for "Untouchable"
Chart (2024)	Peak position
Singapore Regional (RIAS)	22
South Korea (Circle)	93
US World Digital Song Sales (Billboard)	8

=== Monthly charts ===
Monthly chart performance for "Untouchable"
Chart (2024)	Position
South Korea (Circle)	145

== Release history ==
Release history for "Untouchable"
Region	Date	Format	Label
Various	January 8, 2024	Digital download; streaming	JYP; Republic
