= Cho Han-gyul =

South Korean actor (born 2002)

- Born: September 10, 2002 (age 24); South Korea
- Other name: Cho Han-gyeol
- Education: Chungryang High School
- Occupation: Actor
- Years active: 2020–present
- Agent(s): Sublime (2019–2026); Ringcoms Entertainment (2026–present)

Korean name
- Hangul: 조한결
- RR: Jo Hangyeol
- MR: Cho Han'gyŏl
- Website: Official website

Cho Han-gyul (Korean: 조한결; born September 10, 2002) is a South Korean actor. He is best known for his roles in The Haunted Palace (2025) and Undercover Miss Hong (2026).

== Career ==
Cho Han-gyul made his acting debut in the 2020 web drama Let Me Off the Earth. He subsequently gained wider public recognition through his appearances in KBS1's Be My Dream Family (2021) and KBS2's Jinxed at First (2022).

In 2026, Cho starred in tvN's workplace comedy series Undercover Miss Hong where he played a corporate manager who likes conspiracy theories opposite Park Shin-hye and Ko Kyung-pyo.

== Filmography ==
=== Television series ===
Key
†	Denotes television productions that have not yet been released

Year	Title	Role	Ref.
2021	Be My Dream Family	Im Heon	
2022	Jinxed at First	Jo Jang-geun	
2024	Connection	Jang Jae-gyeong (young)	
2024	Romance in the House	Son Hyung-gi	
2025	The Haunted Palace	Bibi	
2025	The Winning Try	Kang Tae-pung	
2025	My Youth	Kim Seok-joo (young)	
2026	Undercover Miss Hong	Albert Oh / Oh Ah-ram	
2027	High School Queen †	Lee Do-yun / Lee Nyeong	

=== Web series ===
Year	Title	Role	Ref.
2020–2021	Let Me Off the Earth	Cho Han-gyeol	
2023	Love Mate	Jung Ha-ram	
2023	Blue Temperature	Soo-hyuk	
2023	Dongsu Super	Kim Dong-su	

=== Music video appearances ===
Year	Title	Artist	Ref.
2020	"빗소리"	Yoon Do-hyun	
2021	"MAGNETIC ft. Jackson Wang"	Rain	
