= Ha Yoon-kyung =

South Korean actress (born 1992)

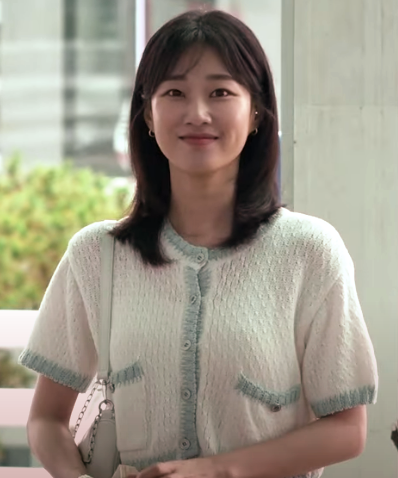
- Ha in August 2022
- Born: October 20, 1992 (age 33); Seoul, South Korea
- Education: Korea National University of Arts
- Occupation: Actress
- Years active: 2015–present
- Agent: HODU&U Entertainment

Korean name
- Hangul: 하윤경
- RR: Ha Yungyeong
- MR: Ha Yun'gyŏng

Ha Yoon-kyung (Korean: 하윤경; born October 20, 1992) is a South Korean actress. She is best known for her roles in television series such as Hospital Playlist (2020–2021), Extraordinary Attorney Woo (2022), See You in My 19th Life (2023) and Undercover Miss Hong (2026).

== Life and career ==
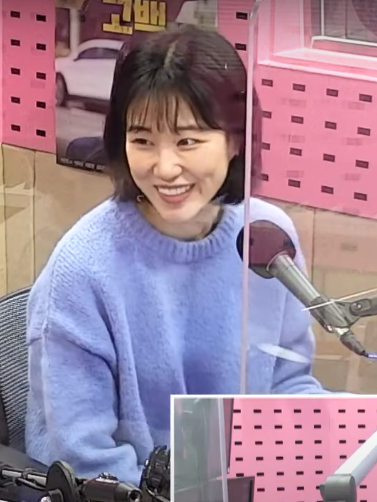
Ha in February 2021

Ha Yoon-kyung was born on October 20, 1992, in Seodaemun District, Seoul, South Korea. She started out her career as a theatre actress in the 2015 play Ballade Pour Roxanna. Ha was involved in various independent films before appearing in television productions.

In 2026, Ha starred in TvN's workplace comedy series Undercover Miss Hong where she played an opportunistic secretary opposite Park Shin-hye and Ko Kyung-pyo.

== Filmography ==
=== Film ===
Year	Title	Role	Notes	Ref.
2015	Socialphobia	Ha-young/Re-na		
2016	Stay with Me	Ha Yoon		
2016	Squid	Daughter/Heji		
2017	Mr Subjective	Ji-sun		
2018	Taklamakan	Soo-eun		
2018	Park Hwa-young	Yoon-kyung		
2019	Hello	Yeo-bin		
2021	Go Back	Ji-won	Independent film	
2022	Gyeong-ah's Daughter	Yeonsu	Independent film	
2023	Concerning My Daughter	Re In	Independent film	

=== Television series ===
Year	Title	Role	Notes	Ref.
2018	Matrimonial Chaos	Joo Soo-kyung		
2018	Queen of Mystery 2	Kang Joo-yeon		
2020–2021	Hospital Playlist	Heo Seon-bin	Season 1–2	
2021	She Would Never Know	Chae Yeon-seung		
2021	KBS Drama Special: "A Moment of Romance"	Jung Yun-jeong	one act-drama	
2022	O'Pening: "Shared Office Hookup"	Wi Da-in	one act-drama	
2022	Extraordinary Attorney Woo	Choi Soo-yeon		
2023	Dr. Romantic	Herself	Cameo (episode 2); Season 3	
2023	See You in My 19th Life	Yoon Cho-won		
2024	Flex X Cop	Hong Eun-a	Cameo (episode 6–8)	
2024	The Frog	Yoon Bo-min (young)		
2024	Gangnam B-Side	Min Seo-jin		
2025	Resident Playbook	Heo Seon-bin	Special appearance (Ep. 3)	
2026	Undercover Miss Hong	Go Bok-hee		
2026	The Apartment Job	Kang Ha-ri		
2026	Marble of God	Geol-seung		

=== Music video appearances ===
Year	Song title	Artist	Ref.
2014	"The Seven Year Itch"	Yangbans	
2024	"Unending Days"	Kyuhyun	

== Theater ==
Year	Title	Role	Ref.
2015	Ballade Pour Roxanna (록산느를 위한 발라드)	Roxanna	
2016	Nakwon (낙원)	Seo Minkyung	

== Discography ==
=== Soundtrack appearances ===
Title	Year	Album
"Snowy Night" (눈 오는 밤)	2022	Gyeong-ah's Daughter OST

== Awards and nominations ==
Name of the award ceremony, year presented, category, nominee of the award, and the result of the nomination
Award ceremony	Year	Category	Nominee / work	Result	Ref.
Baeksang Arts Awards	2023	Best New Actress – Television	Extraordinary Attorney Woo	Nominated	
Baeksang Arts Awards	2023	Best New Actress – Film	Gyeong-ah's Daughter	Nominated	
Baeksang Arts Awards	2026	Best Supporting Actress – Television	Undercover Miss Hong	Nominated	
Bechdel Day	2022	Bechdelians of the Year	Gyeong-ah's Daughter	Won	
Busan Film Critics Awards	2022	Best New Actress	Gyeong-ah's Daughter	Won	
Women in Film Korea Festival	2022	Best Newcomer Award	Gyeong-ah's Daughter	Won	
