= Ice Cream (Yuna song) =

Song by Yuna

from the EP Ice Cream
- Language: English; Korean
- Released: March 23, 2026
- Length: 2:51
- Label: JYP
- Composers: Marc Sibley; Nathan Cunningham; Feyi; Breyan Stanley Isaac; MLite
- Lyricists: Exy; Perrie; Uyeon

Music video
- "Ice Cream" on YouTube

Professional ratings
Review scores
Source	Rating
IZM	2.5/5 stars

"Ice Cream" is a song recorded by South Korean singer Yuna for her debut extended play (EP) Ice Cream. It was released as the lead single by JYP Entertainment on March 23, 2026.

== Background and release ==
On March 2, 2026, JYP Entertainment announced that Yuna would make her solo debut with the EP Ice Cream, set for release on March 23, 2026. This made her the second member of Itzy to debut solo, following Yeji.

The track listing for the EP was revealed on March 9, with "Ice Cream" confirmed as the lead single. Music video teasers were released on March 16 and 18, followed by an album spoiler video on March 20.

== Composition ==
"Ice Cream" was written by Exy, Perrie and Uyeon, and composed by Marc Sibley, Nathan Cunningham, Feyi, Breyan Stanley Isaac and Mlite. The song is described as a bubblegum pop track with a bright and catchy sound, conveying a message about enjoying the moment freely as it melts away like ice cream.

Musically, the track is composed in the key C-sharp major and has a tempo of 143 beats per minute.

I was very nervous, and my heart was beating really fast when I first heard the song because I immediately felt like it was mine, I also kept thinking about how I would share it with our fans and how much they would like it.

— Yuna, on first hearing the song

== Promotion ==
Yuna performed "Ice Cream" for the first time on Mnet M Countdown on March 26. She continued promotions with performances on KBS's Music Bank on March 27 and SBS's Inkigayo on March 29.

== Charts ==
Chart performance for "Ice Cream"
Chart (2026)	Peak position
South Korea (Circle)	121

== Release history ==
Release history for "Ice Cream"
Region	Date	Format	Label
Various	March 23, 2026	Digital download; streaming	JYP
