= Born to Be (EP) =

- Digital cover

EP by Itzy
- Released: January 8, 2024
- Studios: JYPE Studio (Seoul); Galactika Studios (Seoul)
- Genres: EDM; dance-pop; rock
- Length: 31:30
- Language: Korean
- Labels: JYP; Republic
- Producer: J.Y. Park "The Asiansoul"

Itzy chronology
Ringo (2023)	Born to Be (2024)	Gold (2024)

Singles from Born to Be
- 1. "Untouchable" Released: January 8, 2024

Professional ratings
Review scores
Source	Rating
AllMusic	3.5/5 stars
IZM	2.5/5 stars

Born to Be is the eighth extended play by the South Korean girl group Itzy. The EP was released on January 8, 2024, through JYP Entertainment, and Republic Records, six months following the release of Kill My Doubt (2023). Released during Lia's hiatus, the EP was promoted by the group as a quartet.

Aspiring to explore different genres and styles, Born to Be sees Itzy explore different genres and styles. Thematically, the EP revolves around the concept of the members being female warriors who embody strength and leave a "lasting expression".

Born to Be consists of ten tracks, led by the single "Untouchable". The EP features the first solo tracks performed by the members of the quintet, with the music videos for each track being released sequentially in the run-up to the EP's release. The album was also supported by pre-release music videos for album tracks "Born to Be" and "Mr. Vampire".

== Background ==
On July 31, 2023, Itzy released their seventh extended play (EP) Kill My Doubt, which explored themes of overcoming adversity and self-doubt and carried elements of pop. Following the album's release, Lia announced that she would take a hiatus to focus on her mental health from September 18, after having experienced "extreme levels of anxiety". Amid Lia's hiatus, on November 17, JYP Entertainment announced that she opted to not participate in the production and promotion of the group's next release in January 2024, reiterating her recovery as a priority. Nonetheless, Lia recorded "Blossom" in advance for the album and the song was confirmed to be included in the tracklist of the release. "Blossom" was released the same day as the announcement and was accompanied by a lyric video.

== Music and lyrics ==
=== Composition ===
"Our new album is so powerful, powerful to the extent that you'll be able to taste the smell of the flame burning hot."

— Yeji, in a press interview for Born to Be

Born to Be has a runtime of 31 minutes and 30 seconds and contains a total of ten tracks. In a press release, JYP Entertainment envisioned the concept of the album as a "fusion of wild, bold and understated charm", with Itzy acting as charismatic female warriors who leave a "lasting impression" by "embodying both outer and inner strength". The group explored different genres and styles for the album in an effort to "get out of our [their] comfort zones". Described by Yuna as a "box full of gifts", the album is composed of "powerful performances" that express the confidence of the members.

With the members credited for the lyrics and composition for their solo tracks, the album is the first release to see the members participate in songwriting and composition. Moreover, it is the first Itzy release to feature solo tracks from the members. In addition to its members, the girl group also worked with composers Maria Marcus, Tobias Näslund, and lyricists Bang Hye-hyun, and Lee Seu-ran for the album.

=== Songs ===
The album opens with the lead track "Born to Be", an EDM track that expresses the members' "bold ambition to go as desired in a free-born world". In "Untouchable", the title track of the release, the members sing about their resilience through a midtempo dance-pop EDM track characterized by "strong guitar sounds". "Mr. Vampire" discusses the thrill of falling in love through vampire-inspired metaphors backed by "sweet, dreamy" melodies.

The solo tracks begin with Yeji's "Crown on My Head", a rock and roll-influenced track that expresses confidence in its lyrics. Lia follows with "Blossom", which she describes as being "filled with my sincerity that I want to express to fans". Ryujin's "Run Away" follows as a modern rock song that depicts "one's willingness to act as a villain for someone who lacks courage". "Mine", Chaeryeong's solo track, is characterized by a "groovy shuffle rhythm" and a "dreamy guitar sound". The last solo track and the album's penultimate track, "Yet, But", Yuna's solo track, incorporates synth sounds and guitar riffs and carries the message of "shining like a diamond".

== Release and promotion ==
On December 4, 2023, the quintet's eighth extended play, Born to Be, was formally announced through a "fiery" teaser video, with the album's tracklist being unveiled simultaneously. Born to Be follows Itzy's EP Kill My Doubt released in July 2023.

=== Marketing ===
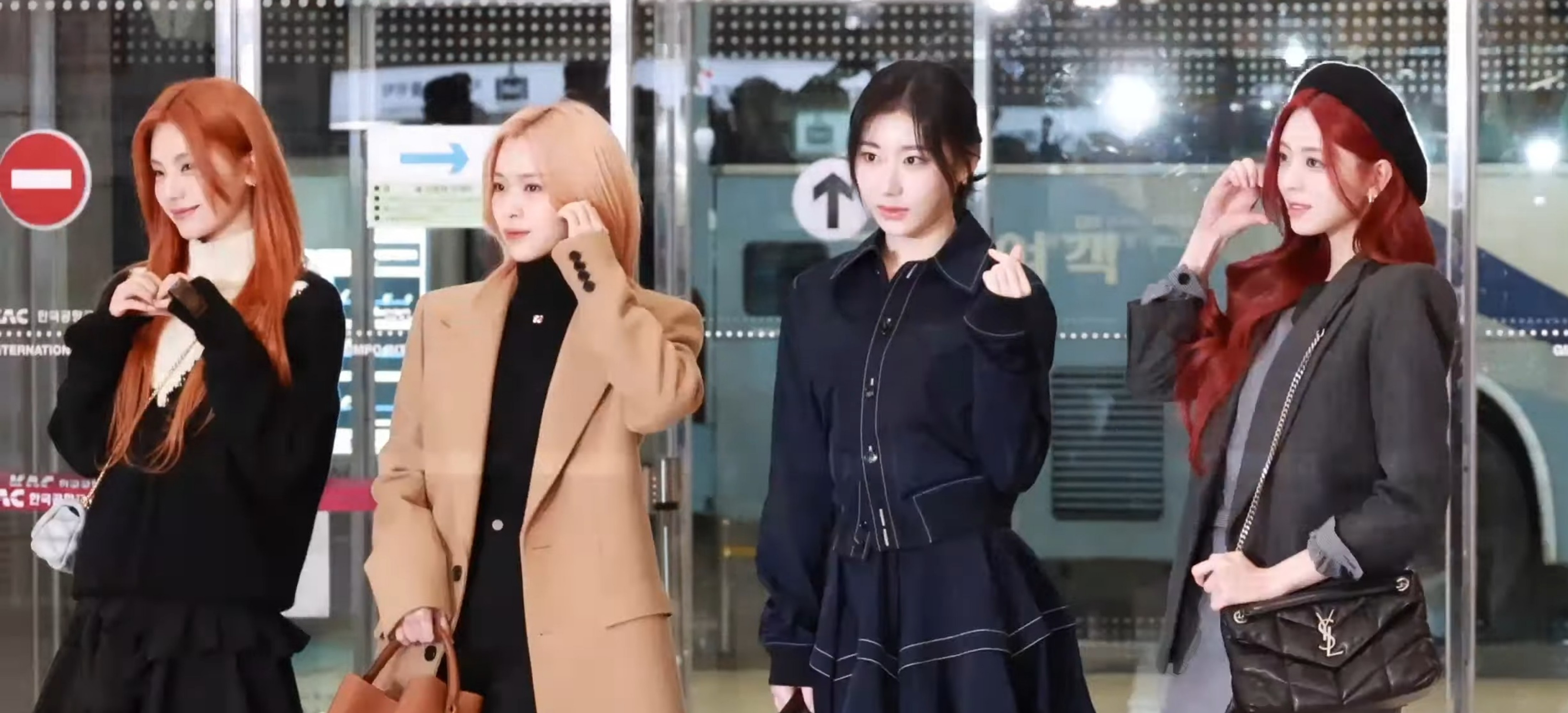
Itzy departing the airport as a quartet in December 2023

"Born to Be", the first track to be released from the album, was promoted through promotional photos released from December 11 through 15. The images depict the members sporting cropped tops and leather while posing in a cave. Ahead of the release of the music video for "Mr. Vampire", on December 29, promotional photos for the track were released. A preview of the track's music video was also released. Teasers for "Untouchable" were first released on January 4.

=== Music videos ===
In total, the album was supported by seven music videos and one lyric video. The first of seven music videos was released on December 18, with the music video for the title track "Born to Be", which depict the members in computer-generated volcanic settings performing choreography composed by choreographer Choi Young-jun.

Prior to the album's release, solo tracks performed by the members of quintet were released, each accompanied by a music video. Lia's solo track, "Blossom", the first of the solo tracks released, was instead released with an accompanying lyric video on November 18, as a gift for longing fans following the extension of her hiatus. The second, Yeji's "Crown on My Head", followed on December 20. Ryujin's "Run Away" then followed as the third solo track on December 22. Chaeryeong's "Mine" was released as the fourth track on December 25. The final solo track, that of Yuna, "Yet, But", was released on December 27.

Pre-release single "Mr. Vampire" was also supported by a music video. Released on January 2, the choreography-based visual is set in an enclosed space where the members discuss their ideal types and express the thrill of falling in love. The final music video, that of the lead single "Untouchable", was released in conjunction with the album on January 8.

=== World tour ===
With the announcement of the album, JYP Entertainment announced that Itzy will embark on the Born to Be World Tour to support the album, beginning with two shows at the Jamsil Arena, from February 24 to 25, 2024, the latter day being live streamed through Beyond Live. More dates, spanning from March through August 2024, were announced on January 26, with shows to be held across Asia, North America, Europe South America, and Oceania. The tour concluded on August 10 at the AsiaWorld–Arena in Hong Kong.

== Accolades ==
=== Listicles ===
Listicles
Publisher	Year	Listicle	Placement	Ref.
Billboard	2024	The 20 Best K-Pop Albums of 2024 (So Far): Staff Picks	6th	

== Track listing ==
Born to Be track listing
No.	Title	Lyrics	Music	Arrangement	Length
1.	"Born to Be"	Noday	Arineh Karimi; Gusten Dahlqvist	Gusten Dahlqvist	2:58
2.	"Untouchable"	Bang Hye-hyun; Lee Seu-ran	Maria Marcus; Zarah Christenson; Tobias Näslund	Tobias Näslund	3:14
3.	"Mr. Vampire"	Seo Ji-yun	Kobee (Melange/InHouse); Holy M (Melange/InHouse); Ezit (InHouse); Noémie Legrand; Sofia Quinn	Melange (InHouse); Ezit (InHouse)	2:50
4.	"Dynamite"	Noday	Kobee (Melange/InHouse); Holy M (Melange/InHouse); Voll (InHouse); Noémie Legrand; Sofia Quinn	Melange (InHouse); Ezit (InHouse)	2:49
5.	"Crown on My Head" (Yeji solo)	Yeji; Friday (Galactika); Jvde (Galactika)	War of Stars (Galactika); Yeji; Pablo (Galactika); Woobin	Team Galactika	3:12
6.	"Blossom" (Lia solo)	Lia; Sim Eun-ji	Lia; Sim Eun-ji	Sim Eun-ji	3:14
7.	"Run Away" (Ryujin solo)	Ryujin; Friday (Galactika); Jvde (Galactika)	War of Stars (Galactika); Pablo (Galactika); Ryujin; Woobin	Team Galactika	3:36
8.	"Mine" (Chaeryeong solo)	Chaeryeong; Selah	Chaeryeong; Lee Woo-min "Collapsedone"; Justin Reinstein; Anna Timgren	Collapsedone	2:48
9.	"Yet, But" (Yuna solo)	Yuna; Saint	Yuna; Lee Woo-min "Collapsedone"; Machi (MRCH)	Collapsedone	3:25
10.	"Escalator"	Lee Tor-eu	G'harah 'PK' Degeddingseze; Tricia Battani	G'harah 'PK' Degeddingseze; Tricia Battani	3:20
Total length:					31:30

== Charts ==
=== Weekly charts ===
Weekly chart performance
Chart (2024)	Peak position
Belgian Albums (Ultratop Flanders)	73
Belgian Albums (Ultratop Wallonia)	108
Croatian International Albums (HDU)	3
French Albums (SNEP)	153
Greek Albums (IFPI)	18
Japanese Albums (Oricon)	22
Japanese Combined Albums (Oricon)	29
Japanese Hot Albums (Billboard Japan)	30
Portuguese Albums (AFP)	13
South Korean Albums (Circle)	1
Swedish Physical Albums (Sverigetopplistan)	11
UK Album Downloads (Official Charts)	14
US Billboard 200	62
US World Albums (Billboard)	2

=== Monthly charts ===
Monthly chart performance
Chart (2024)	Position
Japanese Albums (Oricon)	48
South Korean Albums (Circle)	3

=== Year-end charts ===
Year-end chart performance
Chart (2024)	Position
South Korean Albums (Circle)	44

== Release history ==
Release dates and formats
Region	Date	Format	Version	Label	Ref
Various	January 8, 2024	CD; digital download; streaming	A; B; C; Limited	JYP; Republic	
South Korea	January 8, 2024	Nemo	Nemo	JYP; Republic	
