= Lia (South Korean singer) =

South Korean singer (born 2000)

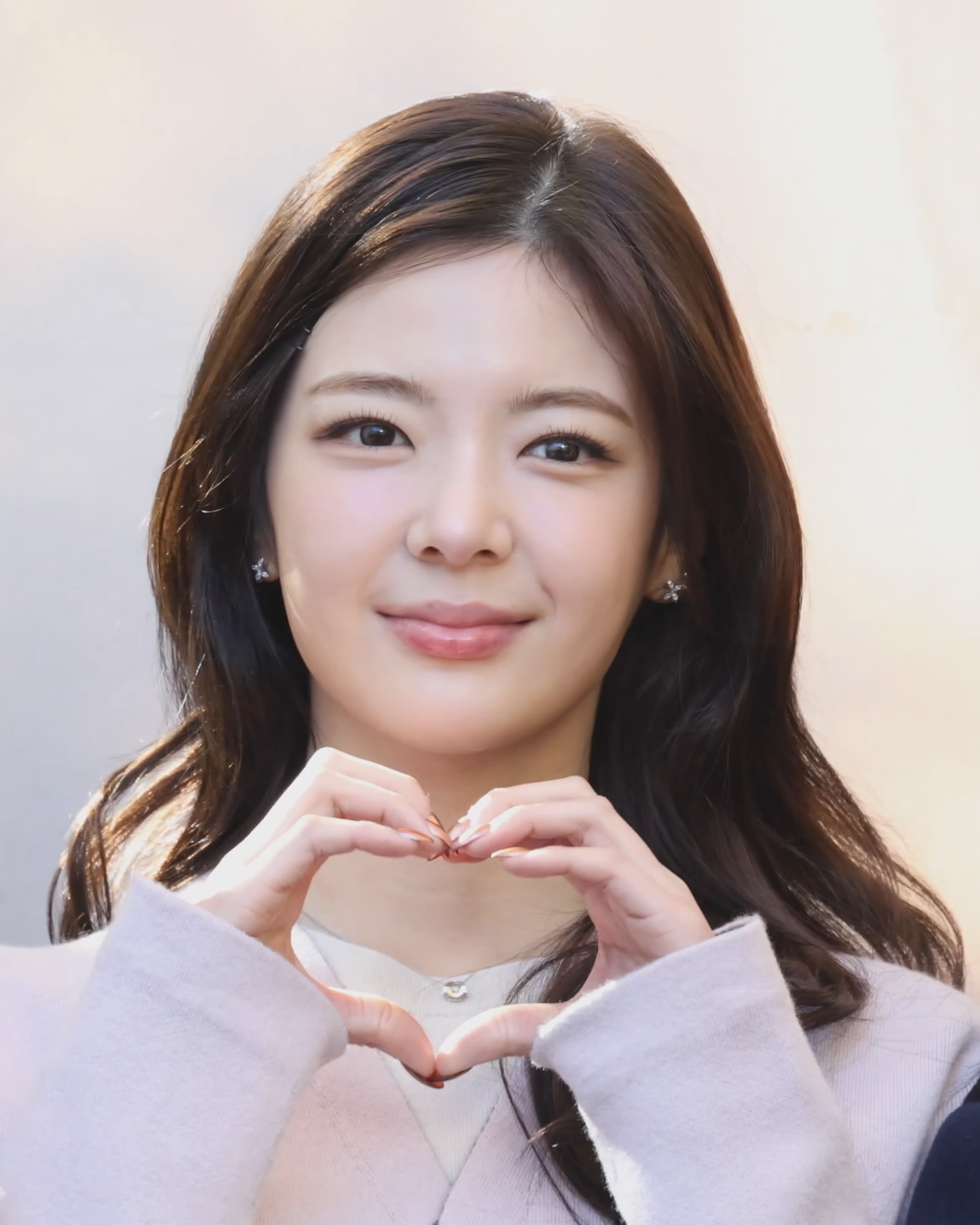
- Lia in November 2025
- Born: Choi Ji-su; July 21, 2000 (age 26); Incheon, South Korea
- Education: School of Performing Arts Seoul
- Occupation: Singer
- Musical career
- Genres: K-pop; J-pop
- Instrument: Vocals
- Years active: 2019–present
- Label: JYP
- Member of: Itzy

Korean name
- Hangul: 최지수
- RR: Choe Jisu
- MR: Ch'oe Chisu

Signature
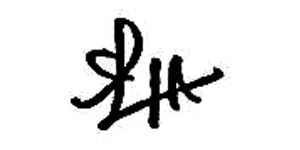

Choi Ji-su (Korean: 최지수; born July 21, 2000), better known by her stage name Lia (리아), is a South Korean singer. She is a member of the South Korean girl group Itzy, formed by JYP Entertainment in 2019.

== Early life ==
Lia was born on July 21, 2000, as Choi Ji-su, in Incheon, South Korea. While in elementary school, she moved to Toronto, Canada. She initially passed an audition for SM Entertainment when she was 14, but backed out due to a disagreement with her parents. Lia returned to South Korea and attended North London Collegiate School Jeju. In 2017, she passed an audition for JYP Entertainment and trained for two years. She later graduated from the School of Performing Arts Seoul.

== Career ==
=== 2019–present: Debut with Itzy ===
On February 12, 2019, Lia officially debuted as a member of Itzy with the release of their first single album, It'z Different, and the music video for its lead single "Dalla Dalla". In 2022, she released her solo song "Always Be Your Star" for MBC's The Red Sleeve. Later that year, she recorded "Blue Flower" for tvN's Alchemy of Souls 2, which peaked at number 184 on the Circle Chart. On May 26, 2023, Lia released "One Hundred Love" for the original soundtrack of Dr. Romantic.

On September 18, 2023, JYP Entertainment announced that Lia would be taking a hiatus to focus on treatment for anxiety. During her break, she released "Blossom", a solo track dedicated to her fans, which she co-wrote with Sim Eun-ji as part of Itzy's solo performances on the EP Born to Be.

On July 9, 2024, JYP Entertainment announced that Lia would resume activities with Itzy, starting with a new album set for release in the second half of the year. In the same year, she recorded "Why Not" for SBS's The Fiery Priest 2, and "Woodahe" for JTBC's The Tale of Lady Ok.

== Other ventures ==
=== Fashion ===
In March 2023, Lia was featured in a solo pictorial for Elle Korea, where she shared her personal style and reflections. In the accompanying interview, she discussed Itzy's identity, emphasizing the importance of living authentically and spreading positive energy. She also reflected on her personal growth and journey alongside Itzy.

=== Philanthropy ===
In August 2022, Lia donated ₩30 million (equivalent to ₩32.48 million or US$24,230.81 in 2025) to The Hope Bridge National Disaster Relief Association to support flood victims. In December 2023, she donated ₩30 million (equivalent to ₩31.35 million or US$23,389.39 in 2025) to the National Cancer Center Foundation to support pediatric cancer patients.

== Discography ==
=== Soundtrack appearances ===
List of soundtrack appearances, showing year released, selected chart positions and album name
| Title | Year | Peak chart positions | Album |
| Title | Year | KOR | Album |
|---|---|---|---|
| "Always Be Your Star" | 2022 | — (Note: "Always Be Your Star" did not enter the Gaon Digital Chart, but peaked at number 6 and 34 on Gaon BGM Chart and Gaon Download Chart, respectively.) | The Red Sleeve OST |
| "Blue Flower" | 2022 | 184 | Alchemy of Souls: Light and Shadow OST |
| "One Hundred Love" | 2023 | — (Note: "One Hundred Love" did not enter the Circle Digital Chart, but peaked at number 10 and 122 on Circle BGM Chart and Circle Download Chart, respectively.) | Dr. Romantic 3 OST |
| "Why Not" | 2024 | — (Note: "Why Not" did not enter the Circle Digital Chart, but peaked at number 116 on the Download Chart.) | The Fiery Priest 2 OST |
| "Woodahe" (with Choo Young-woo) | 2024 | — (Note: "Woodahe" did not enter the Circle Digital Chart, but peaked at number 56 on the Download Chart.) | The Tale of Lady Ok OST |
| "One Day" | 2025 | — (Note: "One Day" did not enter the Circle Digital Chart, but peaked at number 168 on the Download Chart.) | Ms. Incognito OST |
| "How I Love You" | 2026 | — (Note: "How I Love You" did not enter the Circle Digital Chart, but peaked at number 120 on the Download Chart.) | Idol I OST |
"—" denotes a recording that did not chart or was not released in that region.

=== Other charted songs ===
List of other charted songs, with selected chart positions, showing year released and album title
| Title | Year | Peak chart positions | Album |
| Title | Year | KOR DL | Album |
|---|---|---|---|
| "Blossom" (Note: credited to Itzy, but the track is a solo by Lia) | 2024 | 49 | Born to Be |
| "Asylum" (Note: credited to Itzy, but the track is a solo by Lia) | 2026 | 57 | Motto |

=== Composition credits ===
All song credits are adapted from the Korea Music Copyright Association's database unless stated otherwise.

List of songs, showing year released, artist name, and name of the album
| Year | Artist | Song | Album | Lyricist | | Composition | | Ref. |
| Year | Artist | Song | Album | Credited | With | Credited | With | Ref. |
|---|---|---|---|---|---|---|---|---|
| 2024 | Herself | "Blossom" | Born to Be | Yes | Sim Eun-ji | Yes | Sim Eun-ji | |
| 2025 | Itzy | "Focus" | Tunnel Vision | Yes | Yeji, Ryujin, Chaeryeong, Yuna, Noday | No | —N/a | |

== Filmography ==
=== Hosting ===
| Year | Title | Notes | Ref. |
|---|---|---|---|
| 2020 | 9th Gaon Chart Music Awards | with Leeteuk | |
| 2020 | Dream Concert | with Eunhyuk and Cha Eun-woo | |
| 2021 | 10th Gaon Chart Music Awards | with Leeteuk | |
