= Imaginary Friend (Itzy song) =

Single by Itzy

from the EP Gold
- Language: Korean
- Released: October 15, 2024
- Genre: Dance-pop
- Length: 3:22
- Label: JYP; Republic
- Composers: Ryan S. Jhun; James Daniel Lewis; Sorana Pacurar
- Lyricist: Ryan S. Jhun

Itzy singles chronology
| "Gold" (2024) | "Imaginary Friend" (2024) | "Girls Will Be Girls" (2025) |

Music video
- "Imaginary Friend" on YouTube

"Imaginary Friend" is a song recorded by South Korean girl group Itzy for their ninth extended play, Gold. It was released as the EP's second single by JYP Entertainment on October 15, 2024.

== Background and release ==
On July 9, 2024, JYP Entertainment announced that Itzy would be releasing a new record in October 2024. On September 13, the agency confirmed that the group's ninth extended play, Gold, would be released on October 15. The track listing and promotional schedule were also released on the same day, with "Gold" and "Imaginary Friend" announced as the lead singles. On October 7, together with five tracks from the EP, the preview for "Imaginary Friend" was released. The song was released alongside the extended play on October 15. The music video teasers for "Imaginary Friend" were later released on October 23 and 25. The English version of the song was released on October 25. On October 28, the music video was released.

== Composition ==
"Imaginary Friend" was produced by Ryan S. Jhun alongside James Daniel Lewis who contributed to the composition and arrangement, with Sorana Pacurar participating in the composition, and Jun Seo and Hwan Yang participating in the arrangement. It was described as a pop-dance song that combines vintage pop guitar, acoustic band sound, and vocal harmonies with mellow tones.

== Promotion ==
Following two weeks of promotion for "Gold" on music programs, promotion for "Imaginary Friend" began. Itzy performed on two music programs in the first week of promotion: KBS's Music Bank on November 1, and SBS's Inkigayo on November 3.

== Credits and personnel ==
Credits adapted from Melon.

Studio

- JYPE Studio – recording, digital editing
- 821 Sound – digital editing
- Alawn Music Studios – mixing

Personnel

- Itzy – vocals
- Perrie – background vocals
- Sorana Pacurar – background vocals, composition
- Ryan S. Jhun – lyrics, composition, arrangement, vocal directing, programming
- James Daniel Lewis – composition, arrangement, programming
- Jun Seo – arrangement, programming
- Hwan Yang – arrangement, programming
- Uhm Se-hee – recording
- Im Chan-mi – recording, digital editing
- Kwak Bo-eun – recording
- Yue – digital editing
- Kim Min-hee – digital editing
- Alawn – mixing

== Release history ==
Release history for "Imaginary Friend"
| Region | Date | Format | Version | Label |
|---|---|---|---|---|
| Various | October 15, 2024 | Digital download; streaming | Original | JYP; Republic |
| Various | October 25, 2024 | Digital download; streaming | English | JYP; Republic |
