= Gold (Itzy song) =

- English version cover

Single by Itzy

from the EP Gold
- Language: Korean
- Released: October 15, 2024
- Genre: Pop rock
- Length: 3:07
- Label: JYP; Republic
- Composers: Ryan S. Jhun; Dem Jointz; Jen DeCilveo; 8AE; Bailey Flores; Stan Greene
- Lyricists: Ryan S. Jhun; Seon; Young; Eeeee

Itzy singles chronology
| "Algorhythm" (2024) | "Gold" (2024) | "Imaginary Friend" (2024) |

Music video
- "Gold" on YouTube

Professional ratings
Review scores
| Source | Rating |
|---|---|
| IZM | 1.5/5 stars |

"Gold" is a song recorded by South Korean girl group Itzy for their ninth extended play of the same name. It was released as the EP's lead single by JYP Entertainment on October 15, 2024.

== Background and release ==
On July 9, 2024, JYP Entertainment confirmed that Itzy would release a new record in October 2024. On September 13, the agency announced they would release their ninth extended play, Gold, on October 15. The track listing and promotional schedule were also released on the same day, with "Gold" and "Imaginary Friend" announced as the singles. On October 7, the preview of "Gold" alongside five tracks from the EP was released. The music video teasers were released on October 9 and 11. The song was released alongside its music video and the extended play on October 15. Later, Itzy released the English version of the song, alongside "Imaginary Friend" on October 25.

== Composition ==
"Gold" was produced by Ryan S. Jhun alongside Dem Jointz who contributed to the composition and arrangement, with Seon, Y0ung, and Eeeee participating in the lyrics writing, and Jen DeCilveo, 8AE, Bailey Flores, and Stan Greene participating in the composition. It was described as a "powerful" pop rock song characterized by an "electric guitar" rhythm with lyrics about "the overwhelming emotions and unfamiliar feelings when the world completely changes after meeting someone".

== Promotion ==
Prior to the release of Gold, on October 15, 2024, Itzy held a live event on YouTube aimed at introducing the extended play and its songs, including "Gold", and connecting with their fanbase. They subsequently performed on three music programs in the first week of promotion: Mnet's M Countdown on October 17, KBS's Music Bank on October 18, and MBC's Show! Music Core on October 19.

== Track listing ==
- Digital download and streaming – English version
1. "Gold" (English version) – 3:07
2. "Imaginary Friend" (English version) – 3:22

== Credits and personnel ==
Credits adapted from the EP's liner notes.

Studio

- JYPE Studio – recording, digital editing
- 821 Sound – digital editing
- Alawn Music Studios – mixing

Personnel

- Itzy – vocals
- Perrie – background vocals
- Ryan S. Jhun – lyrics, composition, arrangement, vocal directing, programming
- Seon – lyrics
- Y0ung – lyrics
- Eeeee – lyrics
- Dwayne "Dem Jointz" Abernathy Jr – composition, arrangement, programming
- Jen DeCilveo – composition
- Alexis Andrea Boyd a.k.a. 8AE – composition
- Bailey Flores – composition
- Stan Greene – composition
- Uhm Se-hee – recording
- Im Chan-mi – recording, digital editing
- Kwak Bo-eun – recording
- Lee Chang-hoon – recording
- Yue – digital editing
- Kim Gap-su – digital editing
- Kim Min-hee – digital editing
- Alawn – mixing

== Charts ==
Chart performance for "Gold"
| Chart (2024) | Peak position |
|---|---|
| South Korea (Circle) | 122 |

== Release history ==
Release history for "Gold"
| Region | Date | Format | Version | Label |
|---|---|---|---|---|
| Various | October 15, 2024 | Digital download; streaming | Original | JYP; Republic |
| Various | October 25, 2024 | Digital download; streaming | English | JYP; Republic |
