= Air (Yeji song) =

- English version cover

Single by Yeji

from the EP Air
- Language: Korean
- Released: March 10, 2025
- Genre: Synth-pop
- Length: 3:15
- Label: JYP
- Composers: G'harah "PK" Degeddingseze; Tricia Battani; Kirsten Collins
- Lyricists: J.Y. Park "The Asiansoul"; Yeji; Bang Hye-hyun (JamFactory); 3! (Lalala Studio)

Music video
- "Air" on YouTube

"Air" is a song recorded by South Korean singer Yeji for her debut extended play (EP) of the same name. The synth-pop track, co-written by Yeji, seeks to convey the intense sense of immersion she experiences while performing on stage. It was released as the lead single by JYP Entertainment on March 10, 2025.

== Background and release ==
On January 17, 2025, it was announced that Yeji was preparing for her solo debut. On February 10, JYP Entertainment released a trailer for Yeji's debut EP, Air, along with a promotional schedule. The tracklist was revealed on February 14, confirming "Air" as the lead single. An album spoiler featuring a preview of the song was released on March 3. Music video teasers followed on March 5 and 7. The single "Air" was officially released on March 10, with an English version released on March 14.

== Composition ==
"Air" is a synth-pop song characterized by 80's-inspired bass rhythms and an addictive hook. Yeji co-wrote the lyrics to capture the feeling of being fully immersed in the moment, which for her is closely tied to dance. She described the song's concept as reminiscent of the classic Hans Christian Andersen fairy tale "The Red Shoes". Yeji explained that the song is about being so consumed by dance that you can't stop, even if you want to. She added that this uncontrollable urge is captured in both the lyrics and the music video.

== Music video ==
The music video features Yeji's refined artistry, developed throughout her career as an idol. It showcases her performing intricate and fluid dance movements across various settings, culminating in a dramatic finale where she leads a full dance crew in an empty warehouse. The video emphasizes Yeji's stage presence and dedication, reflecting her deep absorption while dancing on stage.

== Promotion ==
Yeji performed "Air" on four music programs, including Mnet's M Countdown on March 13, KBS's Music Bank on March 14, MBC's Show! Music Core on March 15, and SBS's Inkigayo on March 16.

== Credits and personnel ==
Credits adapted from the EP's liner notes.

=== Studio ===
- JYPE Studio – recording, digital editing
- 821 Sound – mastering
- Alawn Music Studios – mixing

=== Personnel ===
- J.Y. Park "The Asiansoul" – lyrics
- Yeji – vocals, lyrics
- Bang Hye-hyun – lyrics
- 3! (Lalala Studio) – lyrics
- G'harah "PK" Degeddingseze – composition, arrangement, all instruments
- Tricia Battani – composition
- Kirsten Collins – composition
- Noday – vocal direction
- Perrie – background vocals
- Yue – digital editing
- Lee Sang-yeop – digital editing
- Lim Chan-mi – digital editing, recording
- Koo Hye-jin – recording
- Alawn – mixing
- Kwon Nam-woo – mastering

== Charts ==
Chart performance for "Air"
Chart (2025)	Peak position
South Korea (Circle)	102
UK Singles Downloads (Official Charts)	100
US World Digital Song Sales (Billboard)	9

== Publication lists ==
Publication lists for "Air"
Critic/Publication	List	Rank	Ref.
Billboard	The 25 Best K-Pop Songs of 2025 (So Far): Critic's Picks	20	
Dazed	The 30 best K-pop tracks of 2025	—N/a	
NME	The 25 best K-pop songs of 2025	24	

== Release history ==
Release history for "Air"
Region	Date	Format	Version	Label
Various	March 10, 2025	Digital download; streaming	Korean	JYP
Various	March 14, 2025	Digital download; streaming	English	JYP
