= Girls Will Be Girls (song) =

- Remixes cover

Single by Itzy

from the EP Girls Will Be Girls
- Language: Korean
- Released: June 9, 2025
- Length: 2:48
- Label: JYP; Republic
- Composers: Ryan Jhun; Jack Brady; Jordan Roman; David Charles Fischer; Kristin Carpenter
- Lyricist: Jo In-ho (Lalala Studio)

Itzy singles chronology
"Imaginary Friend" (2024)	"Girls Will Be Girls" (2025)	"Rock & Roll" (2025)

Music video
- "Girls Will Be Girls" on YouTube

"Girls Will Be Girls" is a song recorded by South Korean girl group Itzy for their tenth extended play of the same name. It was released as the EP's lead single by JYP Entertainment on June 9, 2025.

== Background and release ==
On May 12, 2025, JYP Entertainment announced that Itzy would be releasing a new record titled Girls Will Be Girls on June 9. On May 26, the tracklist was revealed, with "Girls Will Be Girls" announced as the lead single for the extended play. On June 2, a preview of the song was released as part of a highlight medley video. Music video and visual teasers for the song were released on June 4 and 6. The song was released alongside its music video and the extended play on June 9.

== Composition ==
"Girls Will Be Girls" was produced by Ryan Jhun, with Jo In-ho (Lalala Studio) participating in the lyrics writing, Jack Brady, Jordan Roman, David Charles Fischer and Kristin Carpenter participating in the composition, and The Wavys participating in the arrangement. It was described as "a harmonious blend of dynamic beats and expansive vocal harmonies".

== Promotion ==
Prior to the release of Girls Will Be Girls on June 9, 2025, Itzy held a live countdown event on YouTube aimed at introducing the extended play and its songs, including "Girls Will Be Girls", and connecting with their fanbase. They subsequently performed on four music programs in the first week of promotion: Mnet's M Countdown on June 12, KBS's Music Bank on June 13, MBC's Show! Music Core on June 14, and SBS's Inkigayo on June 15.

== Track listing ==
- Digital download and streaming – Remixes
1. "Girls Will Be Girls" (English version) – 2:47
2. "Girls Will Be Girls" (tech house remix) – 2:46
3. "Girls Will Be Girls" (EDM remix) – 2:35
4. "Girls Will Be Girls" (rock remix) – 2:27

== Credits and personnel ==
Credits adapted from Melon.

Studio

- JYPE Studio – recording, digital editing
- Alawn Music Studios – mixing
- 821 Sound Mastering – mastering

Personnel

- Itzy – vocals
- Kim Bo-ah – background vocals, vocal directing
- Jo In-ho (Lalala Studio) - lyrics
- Ryan Jhun – composition, arrangement, vocal directing, programming
- Jack Brady – composition
- Jordan Roman – composition
- David Charles Fischer – composition
- Kristin Carpenter – composition
- The Wavys – arrangement, programming
- Noday – vocal directing
- Kwak Bo-eun – recording
- Goo Hye-jin – recording
- Choi Hye-jin – recording, digital editing
- Alawn – mixing
- Kwon Nam-woo – mastering

== Charts ==
Chart performance for "Girls Will Be Girls"
Chart (2025)	Peak position
Singapore Regional (RIAS)	24
South Korea (Circle)	102

== Release history ==
Release history for "Girls Will Be Girls"
Region	Date	Format	Version	Label
Various	June 9, 2025	Digital download; streaming	Original	JYP; Republic
Various	June 13, 2025	Digital download; streaming	English; Remixes	JYP; Republic
