= Undercover Miss Hong =

2026 South Korean television series

- Promotional poster
- Hangul: 언더커버 미쓰홍
- RR: Eondeokeobeo Misseu Hong
- MR: Ŏndŏk'ŏbŏ Missŭ Hong
- Genre: Workplace comedy
- Written by: Moon Hyun-kyung
- Directed by: Park Seon-ho; Na Ji-hyun
- Starring: Park Shin-hye; Ko Kyung-pyo; Ha Yoon-kyung; Cho Han-gyeol
- Music by: Park Se-jun
- Country of origin: South Korea
- Original language: Korean
- No. of episodes: 16

Production
- Executive producers: So Jae-hyun; Kim Min-jeong; Park Jae-sam; Lee Seung-heee; Park Soo-hwa
- Producer: Ellen Oh
- Cinematography: Yeom Ho-wang; Gu Ja-hoon
- Editors: Jung Il-hwan; Kim Byung-rok
- Running time: 74–78 minutes
- Production companies: Celltrion Entertainment; Studio Dragon

Original release
- Network: tvN
- Release: January 17 – March 8, 2026

Undercover Miss Hong (Korean: 언더커버 미쓰홍) is a 2026 South Korean workplace comedy television series written by Moon Hyun-kyung, directed by Park Seon-ho and Na Ji-hyun, and starring Park Shin-hye in the title role, along with Ko Kyung-pyo, Ha Yoon-kyung, and Cho Han-gyeol. Set in 1997 Seoul, the series follows an elite securities inspector Hong Keum-bo, who goes undercover as a 20-year-old junior employee at a suspicious investment firm, navigating workplace chaos, hidden agendas, and comedic misadventures while investigating financial wrongdoing. It aired on tvN from January 17, to March 8, 2026, every Saturday and Sunday at 21:10 (KST). It is also available for streaming on TVING and Netflix.

== Synopsis ==
Hong Keum-bo is a 35-year-old elite inspector at the Financial Supervisory Service who knows nothing but work. Using her naturally youthful appearance, she goes undercover as a 20-year-old junior employee at Hanmin Investment & Securities where suspicious funds have been detected. As Keum-bo navigates life as an inexperienced entry-level employee, she encounters comedic mishaps, unexpected friendships, and workplace drama, all while secretly investigating financial wrongdoing. Along the way, she must balance her dual identity, confront corporate intrigue, and navigate complicated relationships, including her interactions with the ambitious CEO Shin Jung-woo and her lively younger sister Hong Jang-mi.

== Cast and characters ==
=== Main ===
- Park Shin-hye as Hong Keum-bo

A senior inspector of the Capital Market Investigation Division at the Financial Supervisory Service (FSS) and a Certified Public Accountant, Keum-bo is a Seoun University graduate known for her specialty in investigating economic crimes. When her key contact, Myeong-hwi, dies in a car accident before he can provide evidence of corporate corruption, the investigation's whistleblower goes into hiding. Under the direction of her superior, Keum-bo undergoes an undercover assignment to retrieve a secret ledger from within the Hanmin Investment & Securities. With the help of her sister, Hong Jang-mi, she assumes her younger sister's name and identity as a 20-year-old high school graduate, and enters the firm as a junior clerk during their 1997 recruitment cycle.

- Ko Kyung-pyo as Shin Jung-woo

A management consultant and corporate investigator who is appointed as the new president of Hanmin Investment & Securities after working at an investment firm in Hong Kong. He prioritizes financial data in his business operations and has a history of using various methods to achieve corporate objectives. His plans change when he meets Hong Jang-mi, who resembles his former college acquaintance, Keum-bo. Although told that Jang-mi is Keum-bo's younger sister, he remains skeptical of her identity while managing a professional crisis that leads him to reconsider his previous methods.

- Ha Yoon-kyung as Go Bok-hee

A secretary at Hanmin Investment & Securities and Jang-mi's dormitory roommate. Due to financial instability caused by her brother's gambling, she seeks to save one million dollars to immigrate to the United States. Following the death of the company president, she is served a termination notice but remains employed after Jang-mi intervenes on her behalf. Although she accepts the assistance, she maintains a skeptical attitude toward Jang-mi's background and motivations.

- Cho Han-gyeol as Albert Oh / Oh A-ram

The grandson of Chairman Kang Pil-beom and Division Manager of the Risk Management Division at Hanmin Investment & Securities. Following the death of his uncle, Myeong-hwi, he is designated as a successor candidate by Chairman Kang. A former film student, he shows little interest in corporate management and spends his work hours watching movies. He becomes involved in the company's internal power struggles after taking an interest in Jang-mi, an entry-level clerk whose actions frequently disrupt the workplace.

=== Supporting ===
==== Seoul City Dormitory for Single Female Workers, Room 301 ====
- Choi Ji-soo as Kang Nora / Kang Eun-joo

The daughter of Chairman Kang and a successor to Hanmin Investment & Securities. Following a kidnapping incident during her childhood, she lived in the United States, and her adult identity has not been disclosed to the public. She returns to Korea after the death of her half-brother to claim an inheritance that requires her to attain permanent employee status at the company. Under the alias Kang Eun-joo, she joins the firm as an entry-level clerk and resides in a company dormitory, where she coordinates with Jang-mi to adapt to the workplace.

- Kang Chae-young as Kim Mi-sook

An employee at the Hanmin Investment & Securities Magang Branch and a resident of Room 301. She is noted for her religious faith and often acts as a mediator among her roommates. Due to her ability to remember names and faces, she has received recognition at her branch for her service and performance.

- Kim Se-a as Kim Beom

Mi-sook's daughter who stays in the dormitory while her mother and the other roommates are at work, eventually being discovered after hiding in a wardrobe.

==== Hanmin Investment & Securities Risk Management Division ====
- Kim Do-hyun as Bang Jin-mok (Yehppee)

A veteran employee at Hanmin Investment & Securities and former fund manager. Despite being repeatedly passed over for promotions and displaying a dismissive attitude toward office decorum, he remains with the firm due to his role in managing the aftermath of corporate incidents and internal crises. He is known for his confrontational history with company leadership, including the late Myeong-hwi.

- Jang do-ha as Lee Yong-gi

An engineering PhD and developer at Hanmin Investment & Securities who participated in the creation of the firm's first cyber banking system. A member of the Risk Management Division, he maintains a professional respect for Manager Bang and a friendly rapport with Albert. He also harbors unrequited feelings for Keum-bo.

==== Key Personnel of Hanmin Investment & Securities ====
- Seo Hyun-chul as So Kyung-dong

A veteran trader at Hanmin Investment & Securities with over 26 years of service and a close confidant of Chairman Kang. He served as the long-time mentor and chief advisor to the late Myeong-hwi. Despite his significant internal influence and reputation among his peers, he reportedly attempted to resign following Myeong-hwi's death, though he remains with the firm.

- Im Chul-soo as Cha Jung-il

General Manager of the Research Division at Hanmin Investment & Securities who utilized his lifelong friendship with the late Myeong-hwi to advance within the company. Following the Myeong-hwi's death, he focuses on maintaining his professional standing under new management. Alongside Kyung-dong and Jin-mok, he is a member of a group of veteran employees nicknamed "So-Bang-Cha".

- Kim Hyung-mook as Oh Deok-gyu

Managing Director of Hanmin Investment & Securities and Chairman Kang's son-in-law. A former government official, he utilizes an extensive network within the financial and political sectors to exert influence. Following the death of Myeong-hwi, he seeks to position himself as the successor to the company and views his son, Albert, as a key part of his plan for control.

- Park Mi-hyun as Song Ju-ran

Chief of Staff at Hanmin Investment & Securities and a long-time confidant of Chairman Kang. Having risen from an entry-level position to become the firm's first female Chief of Staff, she leads the "Yeou-hoe," an internal organization for female employees. She plays a pivotal role in the company's succession struggle, supporting Kang No-ra to prevent Managing Director Oh and Albert Oh from gaining control of the firm.

==== The Founding Family of Hanmin Investment & Securities ====
- Lee Deok-hwa as Kang Pil-beom

Founding chairman of Hanmin Investment & Securities. A self-made tycoon who established the firm following the Korean War, he is faced with a succession crisis after the death of his only son. During the 1997 IMF crisis, he seeks to maintain control of his corporate empire by weighing options between government bailouts and foreign investment, while navigating a complex relationship with his surviving heirs, Nora and Albert.

- Byun Jung-soo as Choi In-ja

Nora's mother and former second wife of Chairman Kang. Following a high-profile divorce and years spent in the United States, she returns to assist her daughter in the succession battle at Hanmin Investment & Securities. She views a strategic marriage between Nora and Jung-woo as a means to secure the family's influence over the company.

- Choi Won-young as Kang Myeong-hwi (special appearance)

The late son of Chairman Kang and the former heir apparent of Hanmin Investment & Securities. Despite his initial success and popularity within the firm, he grew disillusioned with his father's management style and corruption. He died in a car accident while attempting to expose the Chairman's legal indiscretions, leaving a power vacuum that triggered the firm's succession struggle.

==== Financial Supervisory Service ====
- Kim Won-hae as Yun Jae-beom

Director of the Capital Market Investigation Division at the Financial Supervisory Service and Keum-bo's supervisor. He recruited Keum-bo into the regulatory body after her previous career was derailed by whistleblowing. He initiates the secret undercover investigation into Hanmin Investment & Securities without official backing, driven by a mix of professional confidence in Keum-bo's abilities and personal responsibility for her past.

- Han Soo-ho as Nam Dong-gi

Team Leader of the Capital Market Investigation Division at the Financial Supervisory Service. As Keum-bo's peer and rival, he actively seeks to undermine her career. He serves as an informant for Hanmin Investment & Securities, providing Managing Director Oh with confidential internal information from the regulatory agency.

==== Hong Keum-bo's Family ====
- Lee Soo-mi as Kim Soon-jung

Keum-bo's mother who runs Ullala Chicken with her husband.

- Kim Young-woong as Hong Chun-seop

Keum-bo's father who runs Ullala Chicken with his wife.

- Shin Yu-na as Hong Jang-mi (special appearance)

Keum-bo's younger sister. A graduate of a vocational high school with an interest in beauty and fashion, she provides the necessary aesthetic transformation and the legal identity for Keum-bo to carry out her undercover operation.

==== Others ====
- Jung I-rang as Kim Nam-ju

Residential advisor of the Seoul City Dormitory for Single Female Workers.

- Kim Roi-ha as Bong Dal-soo

A former organized crime associate who operates an auto repair shop. He assists Ju-ran, an acquaintance from his hometown, with various tasks.

- Park Jung-pyo as a prosecutor (special appearance)
- An Seol-a as Seol-ah

One of the three university-graduate secretaries at Hanmin Investment & Securities. Representing the 1990s X-Generation, she is a diligent professional who often finds herself in conflict with Bok-hee and Keum-bo due to her competitive nature and quick-witted adaptability.

- Lee Soo-jung as Lee Soo-jung

A member of the university-graduate secretary trio at Hanmin Investment & Securities. She is also in conflict with Bok-hee, engaging in exclusionary behavior such as withholding scheduling information.

- Hwang Hwi as an employee

A member of the Trading Division at Hanmin Investment & Securities. He facilitates a fraudulent sell-off of Hanye Electronics stock as part of a price manipulation scheme.

- Tae Hang-ho as Pak Ki-soo (special appearance)

President of One Million Investment who is involved in a stock price manipulation case. He goes into hiding following a major trading error at Hanmin Investment & Securities but is eventually apprehended at an airport by Keum-bo.

== Episodes ==
No.	Title	Original release date
1	"The Woman Known as the Witch of Yeouido"; Transliteration: "Yeouido manyeora bullineun yeoja" (Korean: 여의도 마녀라 불리는 여자)	January 17, 2026
Financial Supervisory Service investigator Hong Keum-bo exposes a stock manipulation scheme but loses her secret informant, Hanmin Investment & Securities President Kang Myeong-hwi, in a suspicious fatal car accident. With the investigation halted and Keum-bo facing disciplinary action for her unauthorized cooperation with the deceased, she becomes convinced Myeong-hwi was murdered to protect the company's slush funds. To recover the hidden ledgers and identify a mysterious whistleblower known as "Yehppee", Keum-bo assumes the identity of her 20-year-old sister, Hong Jang-mi. She passes the Hanmin Investment & Securities recruitment exam with the highest score and infiltrates the company as an entry-level employee. Upon moving into the employee dormitory, she is assigned to a room with the Chairman's daughter, Kang No-ra, and secretary Go Bok-hee, who immediately finds Keum-bo's face suspiciously familiar.
2	"Between Recruitment and Infiltration"; Transliteration: "Ipsawa chimtu sai" (Korean: 입사와 침투 사이)	January 18, 2026
Keum-bo begins working at Hanmin, where she deals with workplace hierarchy and forms a bond with her roommate, Go Bok-hee, following a dispute with other employees. Her mission is complicated when her ex-boyfriend, Shin Jung-woo, is appointed as the new company president. To prevent him from recognizing her, Keum-bo assists Bok-hee in becoming Jung-woo's secretary by sharing information about his personal preferences. Keum-bo later discovers that Bok-hee has a history of embezzlement and is in possession of the slush fund ledger. While Keum-bo enters the president's office to search for evidence regarding the late Kang Myeong-hwi, she is nearly discovered by Jung-woo.
3	"Right Under the Nose and in the Line of Fire"; Transliteration: "Deungjan miteun eodupgo tteugeopda" (Korean: 등잔 밑은 어둡고 뜨겁다)	January 24, 2026
Under the alias Hong Jang-mi, Keum-bo successfully avoids recognition by her ex-boyfriend, Jung-woo. While undercover, she defends her roommate, Bok-hee, against workplace harassment from General Manager Cha Jung-il, despite an ongoing personal dispute over a suspected slush fund ledger. Keum-bo subsequently leads her team in implementing Hanmin Securities' first company-wide intranet and gains entry into the exclusive "Yeouido Pirates" online community with help from Albert Oh. While investigating General Manager So Kyung-dong, Keum-bo thwarts a fraudulent 3 billion won stock trade, but the responsible employee frames her for the error. To avoid exposure by former colleagues investigating the incident, Keum-bo fakes a medical emergency, but is ultimately summoned to a disciplinary committee overseen by Jung-woo. A flashback reveals their past: Keum-bo ended their engagement years prior after Jung-woo, then her colleague at an accounting firm, chose to conceal Hanmin's corporate corruption.
4	"Sleeping with the Enemy"; Transliteration: "Jeokgwaui dongchim" (Korean: 적과의 동침)	January 25, 2026
Following her disciplinary hearing, Keum-bo is tasked with retrieving a trade cancellation form from One Million Investment to rectify a 3 billion won loss, which is revealed to be a slush fund scheme orchestrated by Chairman Kang Pil-beom. To verify Keum-bo's identity, Jung-woo visits her parents' restaurant, but Keum-bo maintains her cover by claiming to be her own younger sister, Hong Jang-mi. With the anonymous help of her roommates via the "Yeouido Pirates" network and an assist from Albert Oh, Keum-bo intercepts the investment firm's CEO at the airport and secures the necessary documents to keep her job. After anonymously informing Jung-woo of the corruption, Keum-bo and her roommates celebrate getting their salary and, upon returning to the dormitory, their room is mess and an unidentified intruder is discovered hiding in a closet.
5	"Ready or Not, Here I Come"; Transliteration: "Kkokkkok sumeora meorikarak boilla" (Korean: 꼭꼭 숨어라 머리카락 보일라)	January 31, 2026
As tension mounts within Hanmin, Jung-woo confirms that "Hong Jang-mi" is actually Keum-bo working undercover to investigate the company's illegal slush funds. Meanwhile, a dormitory crisis unfolds when Keum-bo discovers her roommate, Kim Mi-sook, has been hiding her young daughter, Beom; though initially resistant, Keum-bo permits the child to stay after Beom accidentally sees her confidential investigation notebook. The corporate investigation centers on the "So-Bang-Cha" trio: So Kyung-dong, Bang Jin-mok, and Cha Jung-il, eventually uncovering that Secretary Song Ju-ran has been using Hanmin Outstanding Women's Club employee accounts to facilitate money laundering, even resorting to the violent disposal of an employee to maintain the secret. Seeking to consolidate his power, Jung-woo positions himself as a potential son-in-law to Chairman Kang, while Keum-bo resolves to infiltrate the club to gather more evidence. Ju-ran notices the striking physical resemblance between Keum-bo and a woman from a surveillance photograph, placing Keum-bo's entire undercover operation at immediate risk of exposure.
6	"The Silence of the Misses"; Transliteration: "'Yang'deurui chimmuk" (Korean: '양'들의 침묵)	February 1, 2026
Jung-woo confirms that Keum-bo is operating undercover at Hanmin under the alias "Hong Jang-mi". After a series of confrontations, Jung-woo forces a confession by halting a company elevator, leading Keum-bo to admit her true identity. The investigation into the firm's slush funds shifts toward the club managed by Ju-ran. Keum-bo learns from her supervisor, Yun Jae-beom, that a recently deceased member of this club was found in a reservoir, suggesting the group's involvement in money laundering. Meanwhile, Bok-hee attempts to flee the dormitory due to the prison release of her abusive brother, but she remains after Keum-bo intervenes to stop his physical assault. To gather intelligence on the Kang family, Keum-bo accepts a date with Albert, which leads to her witnessing him in the company of a man who previously attempted to kidnap her.
7	"I Know What You Did Last Summer"; Transliteration: "Naneul nega jinan yeoreume han ireul algo ittda" (Korean: 나는 네가 지난 여름에 한 일을 알고 있다)	February 7, 2026
Keum-bo successfully identifies "Yehppee", the whistleblower who authored the Hanmin's slush fund ledger. The investigation reveals that Albert was not colluding with the criminal car center owner but was actually investigating the suspicious brake failure that caused Myeong-hwi's death. After Keum-bo rescues Albert from an assault by the shop owner, he shares his findings, leading Keum-bo to realize that the missing ledger was inadvertently destroyed after being hidden by Bok-hee. Despite orders from Jae-beom to abandon the mission, Keum-bo sets a trap to lure out the whistleblower at a location previously used by Myeong-hwi. En route to the meeting, Keum-bo is intercepted by Bok-hee's abusive brother but is rescued by Jung-woo, whose timely intervention allows her to proceed. Although the whistleblower initially flees their encounter, Keum-bo later confronts Jin-mok at the office, revealing she has uncovered his secret identity as Yehppee.
8	"Money Monster"; Transliteration: "Meoni monseuteo" (Korean: 머니 몬스터)	February 8, 2026
The IMF crisis begins, causing widespread financial instability. Chairman Kang orders the falsification of three years of accounting records to secure a government subsidies for Hanmin. Keum-bo attempts to replace these forged documents with the original ledgers during a night shift, but Jung-woo intervenes. He uses this situation to create a conflict between Keum-bo and Jin-mok, leading Jin-mok to believe that Keum-bo intended to turn him over to the authorities. This manipulation results in Jin-mok refusing to cooperate with Keum-bo's investigation further. During this time, Keum-bo discovers that her parents have lost their entire savings due to the collapse of the "New Korea Fund", which was marketed by her own firm. At the same time, the company begins a series of layoffs to cut costs, leaving many of Keum-bo's colleagues unemployed. Keum-bo realizing that legal channels may not be sufficient to hold the chairman accountable for the financial losses of the public.
9	"Two Letters"; Transliteration: "Du gaeui pyeonji" (Korean: 두 개의 편지)	February 14, 2026
Following the hospitalisation of Mi-sook, Keum-bo discovers a 300-billion-won slush fund hidden in a Swiss account registered under Nora's name. Keum-bo decides to intercept this money to compensate the employees facing layoffs and the investors who lost their savings. She recruits her roommate, Bok-hee, to assist with the plan, utilizing Bok-hee's history with embezzlement. The two begin tracking the movement of the funds while avoiding detection by the company's security team. Meanwhile, Jung-woo's true objective is revealed: he intends to facilitate the acquisition of Hanmin by DK Ventures at a low price during the economic downturn. Keum-bo also learns that Jung-woo had previously intervened in a legal matter on her behalf nine years ago, though she remains suspicious of his current activities. Keum-bo and Bok-hee identify a regional bank where a portion of the funds is being held for a manual transfer, setting the stage for their attempt to take the money.
10	"Clash of the Titans"; Transliteration: "Yongjaenghotu" (Korean: 용쟁호투)	February 15, 2026
Keum-bo officially resigns from her position at the Financial Supervisory Service to focus entirely on her undercover role as a entry-level employee at Hanmin. She and Bok-hee use Nora as an unintentional decoy to enter a provincial bank where the slush funds are located. The plan requires Bok-hee to impersonate Secretary Song over the telephone to provide the necessary verbal authorization for a large cash withdrawal. While the operation is underway at the bank, the former members of the Risk Management Division gather to discuss their career difficulties following the corporate restructuring. Nora attempts to reconcile with her roommates by offering to pay for Mi-sook's medical bills, but her offer is rejected due to her family's role in the crisis. The residential supervisor discovers that Mi-sook's daughter is living in the building, forcing Keum-bo to move the child to her parents' home. The bank manager initiates the verification call to Secretary Song's office while Keum-bo waits for the result.
11	"The Masked Pirate"; Transliteration: "Gamyeoneul sseun haejeok" (Korean: 가면을 쓴 해적)	February 21, 2026
Bok-hee successfully completes the phone impersonation, allowing Keum-bo to withdraw the first segment of the slush funds. Keum-bo then focuses on identifying the "Yeouido Pirates", an anonymous group that has been leaking Hanmin's internal data. She discovers that the group consists of Albert and IT specialist Lee Yong-gi. After Albert learns that Keum-bo is a thirty-five-year-old undercover inspector rather than a twenty-year-old clerk, he and Yong-gi agree to join her team. The four individuals begin combining their technical and investigative skills to target the remaining 300 billion won in the chairman's accounts. Simultaneously, Nora notices that Keum-bo and Jung-woo share a specific memory regarding Christmas music, leading her to suspect they were previously in a relationship. Jung-woo continues his efforts to close down the Yeouido Pirates' website to protect the DK Ventures takeover, unaware that the group is now working directly with Keum-bo.
12	"Money Never Sleeps"; Transliteration: "Doneun jamdeulji anneunda" (Korean: 돈은 잠들지 않는다)	February 22, 2026
Keum-bo orchestrates a sting operation alongside Bok-hee, Albert, and Yong-gi targeting Executive Director Oh Deok-gyu. By exploiting rumors of a currency-laundering scheme, the group tricks Deok-gyu into swapping actual slush funds for crates of bricks. The resulting panic forces him to liquidate his holdings, allowing the "Yeouido Pirates" to purchase a significant stake in Hanmin Investment & Securities. This corporate maneuvering is tied to a past revelation: the accountant who died during the scandal nine years ago was the brother of Keum-bo's supervisor, Jae-beom. While the nation participates in the "Gold-collecting Campaign" during the IMF crisis, Mi-sook regains consciousness, leading to a reunion for the Room 301 roommates. However, the withdrawal of the funds alerts Secretary Song, who begins an investigation into the discrepancy. Jung-woo also appears conflicted after learning the details of the tragedy that motivated Keum-bo's actions.
13	"Witch Hunt"; Transliteration: "Manyeosanyang" (Korean: 마녀사냥)	February 28, 2026
After Hong Keum-bo reveals she has been working under the alias "Hong Jang-mi", Ju-ran discovers that 24 billion won in slush funds has been withdrawn. Following a physical confrontation, Keum-bo blackmails Ju-ran into ousting Shin Jung-woo by threatening to reveal the lost funds to Chairman Kang. Meanwhile, Bok-hee protects Keum-bo during a break-in at the dormitory, solidifying their bond. Keum-bo later uses a recorded conversation of Jung-woo's takeover plot to turn Chairman Kang against him, leading to Jung-woo's immediate dismissal from Hanmin and his abandonment by DK Ventures. In the aftermath, Nora discovers the hidden slush funds in her room and joins forces with Keum-bo after expressing resentment toward her father's past negligence. Keum-bo reveals she orchestrated Jung-woo's firing specifically to recruit him as an M&A expert for her own team, the Yeouido Pirates.
14	"The Era of Great Pirates"; Transliteration: "Daehaejeogui sidae" (Korean: 대해적의 시대)	March 1, 2026
Keum-bo successfully recruits Jung-woo into the Yeouido Pirates after disclosing that her goals involve the late Myeong-hwi and the Swiss slush funds of Chairman Kang. During this process, the other team members, including Albert, discover that Keum-bo and Jung-woo were previously in a relationship. Using account data stolen from Ju-ran's safe by Bok-hee, the group withdraws capital from various banks across Seoul to fund the purchase of Hanmin's stock. The power struggle within the company leads Chairman Kang to promise the president position to whoever identifies the leader of the Yeouido Pirates. Keum-bo manipulates this by having Albert falsely claim leadership to his father, Deok-gyu. Although Albert briefly becomes president, Keum-bo ensures both he and his father are ousted through leaked recordings and embezzlement frames. This allows Nora to take the presidency instead. While Nora hesitates to finalize the Swiss fund withdrawal due to fear, Keum-bo and Jung-woo manage to secure enough shares to become the second-largest shareholders of the company. Jung-woo then informs Chairman Kang that the Pirates purchased their stake using the Chairman's own redirected slush funds.
15	"No Mercy"; Transliteration: "Injeongsajeong bol geot eopda" (Korean: 인정사정 볼 것 없다)	March 7, 2026
Ju-ran attempts to dismantle the Yeouido Pirates by orchestrating the arrest of Bok-hee. During a confrontation at Ullala Chicken, Nora identifies Bong Dal-su as her childhood kidnapper. Although Nora's mother, Choi In-ja (Byun Jung-soo), confronts Chairman Kang Pil-beom (Lee Deok-hwa) about Ju-ran's involvement in the kidnapping, the Chairman prioritizes his position, leading Choi In-ja to grant Keum-bo her 1% stake in the company. The conflict culminates at a shareholders' meeting where a motion to dismiss Chairman Kang fails with 41.4% of the vote. In response, the Chairman organizes a New Year's press conference to introduce Nora as the new face of Hanmin. However, Nora rejects the scripted image, appearing in a standard company uniform instead. She publicly credits her colleagues for teaching her the meaning of family and announces her decision to grant proxy power of her entire stake—including the 9% inherited from late Myeong-hwi—to the Yeouido Pirates, effectively threatening her father's control.
16	"We of the New Millennium"; Transliteration: "Saecheonnyeonui urideul" (Korean: 새천년의 우리들)	March 8, 2026
Nora triggers a major investigation by exposing Chairman Kang's overseas slush funds. Attempting to flee, Pil-beom abandons his secretary, Ju-ran, who is subsequently betrayed by Dal-su. During the embezzlement trial, Jin-mok appears as a surprise witness, providing the decisive testimony needed to corroborate Keum-bo's evidence. Investigations into Dal-su's properties reveal links to the 1988 accounting fraud case and the death of a colleague, resolving a decade-long mystery. Keum-bo, Bok-hee, and Nora rescue Ju-ran from the Chairman's basement, leading to Dal-su's arrest. Chairman Kang is also apprehended after being deceived by In-ja. One year later, the protagonists have transitioned to new roles: Bok-hee operates a private investigation firm, Nora studies to become a pastry chef, and Mi-sook earns a promotion. Jung-woo and Keum-bo settle their past grievances with a handshake. Keum-bo accepts a new undercover assignment as an insurance clerk to investigate fraud.

== Production ==
=== Development ===
Undercover Miss Hong was developed under the working title Miss Undercover Boss (Korean: 미스언더커버보스; RR: Miseueondeokeobeoboseu). The series is directed by Park Seon-ho, who helmed Business Proposal (2022) and Brewing Love (2024), and Na Ji-hyun, written by Moon Hyun-kyung, who penned Memorials (2020), planned and produced by Studio Dragon with Celltrion Entertainment.

=== Casting ===
In March 2025, Park Shin-hye had reportedly reached a tentative agreement to appear in the series. Two months later, Ko Kyung-pyo was reportedly cast as the male lead. In June 2025, both Ha Yoon-kyung and Cho Han-gyeol were reportedly cast alongside Park and Ko. In July 2025, Park, Ko, Ha, and Cho were confirmed to star. Additionally, Yuna was cast marking her acting debut.

== Original soundtrack ==
The series' soundtrack was oversaw by Park Se-jun and produced by Blix Entertainment, marking the company's first project in television drama music production. The company's strategy for the project involved a partnership between its management and established musicians to oversee the score.

=== Album ===
Undercover Miss Hong Original Sound Track

Soundtrack album by Various artists
- Released: March 8, 2026
- Studios: Seoul; Glab; 821 Sound Mastering
- Length: 138:17
- Language: Korean
- Labels: Music Buddy; Studio Dragon; Kakao Entertainment
- Producer: Kim Kyu-nam

Singles from Undercover Miss Hong Original Sound Track
- 1. "The Shape of Memories" Released: January 18, 2026; 2. "Life Comes Back Around" Released: January 24, 2026; 3. "Endlessly" Released: January 25, 2026; 4. "Dance Tonight" Released: February 1, 2026; 5. "Back to You Again" Released: February 7, 2026; 6. "The Open Road" Released: February 14, 2026

All lyrics are written by Park Shin-young, Lee Ki-hwan, Joo Se-hoon(Kiple), Taibian, Dr.Ba$$(1), and Jung Hyeon-jun; all music is composed by Chanran, Kim Young-sung, Lee, Joo, Cona(Kiple), Taibian, Dr.Ba$$(1), and Coda.

CD 1
No.	Title	Artist	Length
1.	"The Shape of Memories" (기억앨범)	Song Ha-young (Fromis 9)	4:12
2.	"Life Comes Back Around" (인생은 부메랑)	Bae Gi-seong	2:52
3.	"Endlessly"	Jacob (The Boyz)	3:00
4.	"Dance Tonight"	Sondia	3:27
5.	"Back to You Again"	Kassy	2:54
6.	"The Open Road" (탄탄대로)	Lee Sang-mi (Ex)	3:24
7.	"The Shape of Memories" (기억앨범; Inst.)		4:12
8.	"Life Comes Back Around" (인생은 부메랑; Inst.)		2:52
9.	"Endlessly" (Inst.)		3:00
10.	"Dance Tonight" (Inst.)		3:27
11.	"Back to You Again" (Inst.)		2:54
12.	"The Open Road" (탄탄대로; Inst.)		3:24
Total length:			39:38

All music is composed by Woo Ji-hoon, Park Se-jun, Kim Dong-hyeok, Choi Moon-seok, Kim Tae-hwan, 5Talent, Na Yoon-sik, Na Sang-jin, Gi Se-in, Yoo Hui-yeon, Park Suk-won, Joo Ji-hoon, Jeon Hyun-ji, Park Ye-chan, Song Jin-seok, Lee Nyeom, Yoon Song, KingMing, Ryu Won-kwang, Jeon Ji-hoon, and Song Jae-kyung.

CD 2
No.	Title	Length
1.	"Spy of Spy"	1:56
2.	"Cherry on Top"	2:31
3.	"Finding a Clue"	1:55
4.	"Go Ahead"	2:02
5.	"It Stays in My Mind"	3:03
6.	"Jumping over the Wall"	1:46
7.	"Loneliness in the Abyss"	3:15
8.	"Prevailing Notion"	3:06
9.	"Comedy Files"	2:06
10.	"Eyes in the Mirror"	2:50
11.	"Funk It Out"	2:04
12.	"Last Choice"	2:01
13.	"Penrose Stairs"	1:52
14.	"Silent War"	2:49
15.	"The Path to Parenthood"	2:41
16.	"Under Gate"	3:02
17.	"Ziant"	2:24
18.	"Let Us Rock"	1:18
19.	"Sneaky Business"	1:17
20.	"Beginning of the Investigation"	2:53
21.	"Back Then"	1:52
22.	"Tail Cutting"	2:14
23.	"Please Grow Up"	2:30
24.	"Completed"	2:21
25.	"Heeled Heels"	2:00
26.	"Accident by Accident"	2:07
27.	"Shadow Network"	2:22
28.	"A Counterattack"	2:26
29.	"Lasy Word"	2:27
30.	"Time Don't Stop"	2:28
31.	"Canon Ball Jack"	2:56
32.	"Clue to the Case"	2:19
33.	"Under Quiet Stars"	1:48
34.	"The Season Has Changed"	2:51
35.	"Break the Line"	2:15
36.	"A Sudden Question"	2:30
37.	"Bunny Hop"	1:43
38.	"Legends Awaken"	2:17
39.	"Back to One's Seat"	1:41
40.	"The Silent One"	2:43
41.	"Tiptoe Trouble"	1:12
42.	"The Truth Comes Out"	3:06
43.	"Double Agent"	1:40
Total length:		98:39

=== Singles ===
Singles included on the album were released from January 18 to February 14, 2026.

Original soundtrack (Part 1–6)

Part 1

All lyrics are written by Park Shin-young; all music is composed by Chanran and Kim Young-sung.

Released on January 18, 2026
No.	Title	Artist	Length
1.	"The Shape of Memories" (기억앨범)	Song Ha-young (Fromis 9)	4:12
2.	"The Shape of Memories" (기억앨범; Inst.)		4:12
Total length:			8:24

Part 2

All lyrics are written by Lee Ki-hwan and Joo Se-hoon(Kiple); all music is composed by Lee, Joo, and Cona(Kiple).

Released on January 24, 2026
No.	Title	Artist	Length
1.	"Life Comes Back Around" (인생은 부메랑)	Bae Gi-seong	2:52
2.	"Life Comes Back Around" (인생은 부메랑; Inst.)		2:52
Total length:			5:44

Part 3

All lyrics are written by Taibian and Dr.Ba$$(1); all music is composed by Taibian, Dr.Ba$$(1), and Coda.

Released on January 25, 2026
No.	Title	Artist	Length
1.	"Endlessly"	Jacob (The Boyz)	3:00
2.	"Endlessly" (Inst.)		3:00
Total length:			6:00

Part 4

All lyrics are written by Jung Hyeon-jun; all music is composed by Taibian, Dr.Ba$$(1), and Coda.

Released on February 1, 2026
No.	Title	Artist	Length
1.	"Dance Tonight"	Sondia	3:27
2.	"Dance Tonight" (Inst.)		3:27
Total length:			6:54

Part 5

All lyrics are written by Jung Hyeon-jun; all music is composed by Taibian, Dr.Ba$$(1), and Coda.

Released on February 7, 2026
No.	Title	Artist	Length
1.	"Back to You Again"	Kassy	2:54
2.	"Back to You Again" (Inst.)		2:54
Total length:			5:48

Part 6

All lyrics are written by Taibian; all music is composed by Taibian, Dr.Ba$$(1), and Coda.

Released on February 14, 2026
No.	Title	Artist	Length
1.	"The Open Road" (탄탄대로)	Lee Sang-mi (Ex)	3:24
2.	"The Open Road" (탄탄대로; Inst.)		3:24
Total length:			6:48

==== Chart performance ====
List of singles, showing year released, with selected chart positions and notes
Title	Year	Peak chart positions	Notes
Title	Year	KOR DL	Notes
"The Shape of Memories" (Song Ha-young)	2026	41	Part 1
"Life Comes Back Around" (Bae Gi-seong)	2026	143	Part 2
"Endlessly" (Jacob)	2026	118	Part 3
"Dance Tonight" (Sondia)	2026	63	Part 4
"Back to You Again" (Kassy)	2026	81	Part 5
"The Open Road" (Lee Sang-mi)	2026	135	Part 6

== Release ==
Undercover Miss Hong was reportedly scheduled to air in the first half of 2026. It premiered on tvN on January 17, 2026, and airs every Saturday and Sunday at 21:10 (KST). The series is also available for streaming on TVING in South Korea and Netflix globally.

== Reception ==
=== Viewership ===
Undercover Miss Hong premiered on January 17, 2026, with a nationwide viewership rating of 3.5% and a metropolitan area rating of 3.2%. While the first episode reached a peak of 4.3%, the series saw an upward trend in subsequent weeks. The penultimate episode, broadcast on March 7, recorded the series' highest average ratings of 13.1% nationwide and 14.0% in the Seoul metropolitan area. The final episode on March 8 averaged 12.4% nationwide and 13.0% in the capital, ranking first in its time slot across all cable and terrestrial channels, particularly within the 20–49 age demographic.

In Netflix, the series entered the global weekly chart for non-English shows at number 6 on the week of January 19–25, 2026, appearing in the top 10 rankings of 41 countries and garnered a total of 1.9 million views. It rose on the chart by one rank the following week then peak at number 4 on the week of February 2–8.

Undercover Miss Hong : South Korea viewers per episode (millions)

Season	Episode number																Average
Season	1	2	3	4	5	6	7	8	9	10	11	12	13	14	15	16	Average
1	0.949	1.380	1.252	1.757	1.421	2.011	1.753	2.274	1.673	2.158	2.587	2.456	2.527	2.727	3.131	3.008	2.067

Source: Audience measurement performed nationwide by Nielsen Korea.

Average TV viewership ratings
Ep.	Original broadcast date	Average audience share (Nielsen Korea)	
Ep.	Original broadcast date	Nationwide	Seoul
1	January 17, 2026	3.512% (1st)	3.171% (1st)
2	January 18, 2026	5.672% (1st)	5.697% (1st)
3	January 24, 2026	5.224% (1st)	5.165% (1st)
4	January 25, 2026	7.408% (1st)	7.236% (1st)
5	January 31, 2026	5.859% (1st)	6.120% (1st)
6	February 1, 2026	7.995% (1st)	8.688% (1st)
7	February 7, 2026	7.491% (1st)	7.535% (1st)
8	February 8, 2026	9.381% (1st)	10.052% (1st)
9	February 14, 2026	7.061% (1st)	7.075% (1st)
10	February 15, 2026	8.605% (1st)	8.451% (1st)
11	February 21, 2026	10.587% (1st)	10.738% (1st)
12	February 22, 2026	10.119% (1st)	10.547% (1st)
13	February 28, 2026	10.643% (1st)	10.868% (1st)
14	March 1, 2026	11.808% (1st)	12.335% (1st)
15	March 7, 2026	13.121% (1st)	13.957% (1st)
16	March 8, 2026	12.363% (1st)	12.968% (1st)
Average		8.553%	8.788%
In the table above, the blue numbers represent the lowest ratings and the red numbers represent the highest ratings.; This series aired on a cable channel/pay TV which normally has a relatively smaller audience compared to free-to-air TV/public broadcasters (KBS, SBS, MBC, and EBS).

=== Accolades ===
Award ceremony	Year	Category	Recipient(s)	Result	Ref.
Baeksang Arts Awards	2026	Best Supporting Actress	Ha Yoon-kyung	Nominated	
Baeksang Arts Awards	2026	Best New Actress	Choi Ji-soo	Nominated	
