= Ice Cream (EP) =

- Digital cover

EP by Yuna
- Released: March 23, 2026
- Length: 11:33
- Languages: English; Korean
- Label: JYP

Singles from Ice Cream
- 1. "Ice Cream" Released: March 23, 2026

Ice Cream is the debut solo extended play (EP) by South Korean singer Yuna of the girl group Itzy. It was released by JYP Entertainment on March 23, 2026, and contains four tracks, including the lead single of the same name.

== Background and release ==
On March 2, 2026, JYP Entertainment announced that Yuna would make her solo debut with the EP Ice Cream, scheduled for release on March 23, 2026. A promotional schedule was released on the same day.

The track listing was revealed on March 9, with "Ice Cream" announced as the lead single. Music video teasers for the song were released on March 16 and 18. An album spoiler video was released on March 20.

== Track listing ==
Ice Cream track listing
No.	Title	Lyrics	Music	Producer(s)	Length
1.	"Ice Cream"	Exy; Perrie; Uyeon	Marc Sibley; Nathan Cunningham; Feyi; Breyan Stanley Isaac; MLite	Space Primates	2:51
2.	"B-Boy"	Airy (Inhouse)	Ikki; Amanda Kongshaung; Elias Edman	Elias Edman	3:01
3.	"Blue Maze"	Kiera (Inhouse)	No2zcat; Ondine; Haris	No2zcat	2:50
4.	"Hyper Dream"	Kim Da-bin (Inhouse)	Shim Eun-ji; Lee Hae-sol; Hilda Stenmalm; Bård Bonsaksen	Lee Hae-sol; Sim Eunjee^{[v]}	2:51
Total length:					11:33

=== Note ===
- ^{^[v]} signifies a vocal producer

== Personnel ==
Credits are adapted from Tidal.

- Yuna – vocals
- C'SA – background vocals (all tracks), vocal arrangement (tracks 1–3), sound editing (1, 3)
- Kwak Bouen – engineering
- Kwon Namwoo – mastering
- Lee Changhoon – engineering (1)
- Lee Taesub – mixing (1)
- Lim Hongjin – engineering (2, 3)
- Eom Sehee – mixing (2)
- No2zcat – bass, drums, synthesizer (3)
- Matthew Kim – engineering (3)
- Kim Gabsoo – mixing (3)
- Lee Hae-sol – keyboards, synthesizer (4)
- Sim Eunjee – vocal arrangement (4)
- Choi Hyejin – engineering (4)
- Seo Eun II – engineering (4)
- Yoon Won-kwon – mixing (4)

== Charts ==
=== Weekly charts ===
Weekly chart performance for Ice Cream
Chart (2026)	Peak position
Japanese Digital Albums (Oricon)	49
Japanese Western Albums (Oricon)	11
Japanese Download Albums (Billboard Japan)	43
South Korean Albums (Circle)	2
US World Albums (Billboard)	12

=== Monthly charts ===
Monthly chart performance for Ice Cream
Chart (2026)	Peak position
South Korean Albums (Circle)	8

== Release history ==
Release history for Ice Cream
Region	Date	Format	Label
South Korea	March 23, 2026	CD	JYP
Various	March 23, 2026	Digital download; streaming	JYP
