= Yuna (singer, born 2003) =

South Korean singer and actress (born 2003)

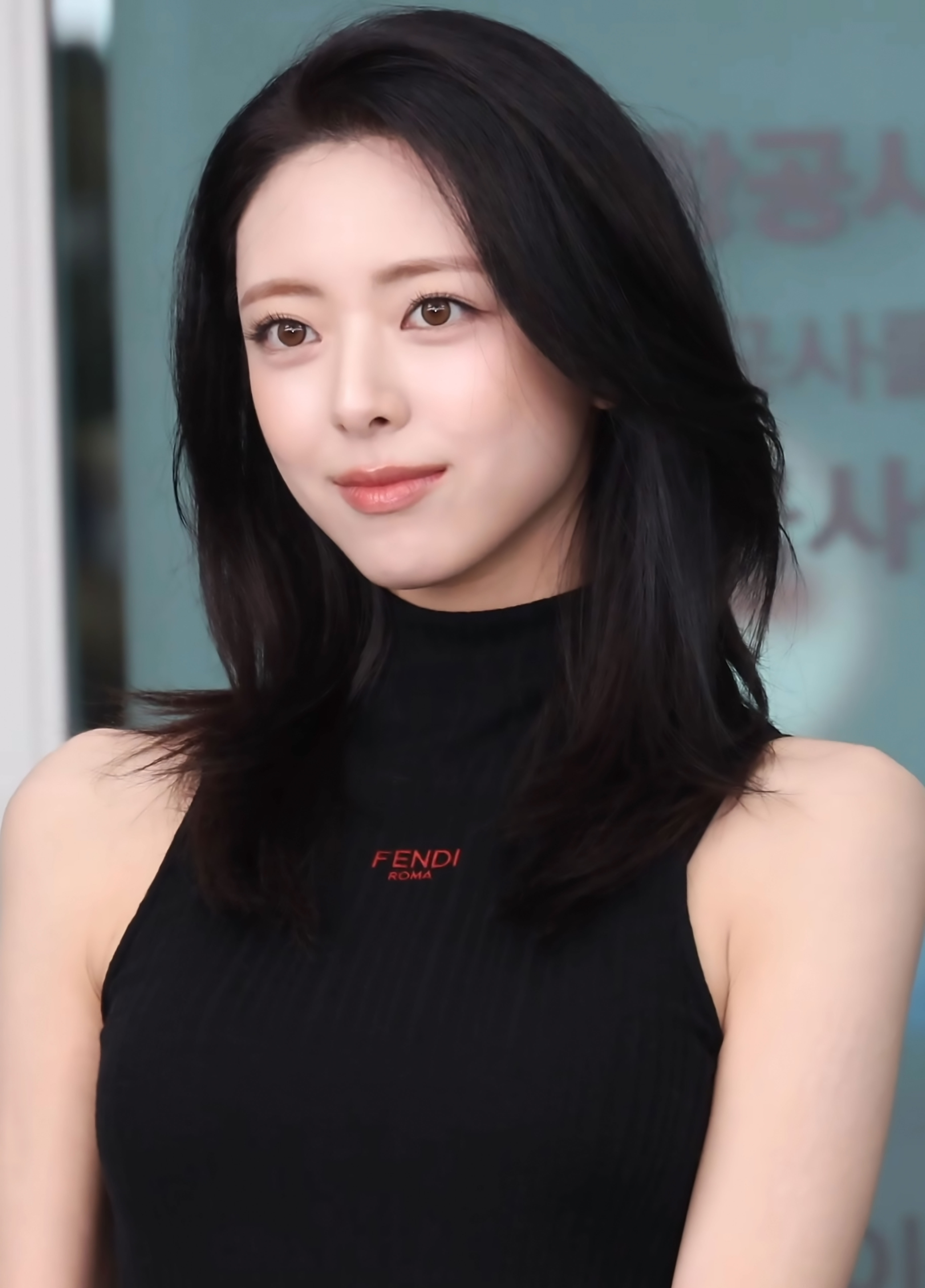
- Yuna in 2025
- Born: Shin Yu-na; December 9, 2003 (age 22); Suwon, South Korea
- Education: Hanlim Multi Art School
- Occupations: Singer; dancer; rapper; actress
- Musical career
- Genres: K-pop; J-pop
- Instrument: Vocals
- Years active: 2019–present
- Label: JYP
- Member of: Itzy

Korean name
- Hangul: 신유나
- RR: Sin Yuna
- MR: Sin Yuna

Shin Yu-na (Korean: 신유나; born December 9, 2003), known mononymously as Yuna, is a South Korean singer, dancer, rapper, and actress. She is a member of the South Korean girl group Itzy, formed by JYP Entertainment in 2019. She made her acting debut in 2026 in Undercover Miss Hong and appeared in My Bias, My Boss. Yuna released her solo debut extended play (EP), Ice Cream, in March 2026.

== Early life ==
Shin Yu-na was born on December 9, 2003, in Suwon, South Korea. While in middle school, she competed in national-level floorball tournaments, representing Gyeonggi. In 2016, she was discovered by a JYP Entertainment casting agent at a music festival and successfully auditioned to join the agency as a trainee. She attended high school at Hanlim Multi Art School and graduated in February 2022.

== Career ==
=== 2017: Pre-debut ===
In 2017, Yuna appeared in the first episode of Stray Kids alongside her future groupmates Yeji, Ryujin, and Chaeryeong. In the same year, she appeared in BTS's "Love Yourself" highlight reel alongside Ryujin. Yuna was not initially included in Itzy's lineup but was later added as the final member of the group.

=== 2019–2024: Debut with Itzy and solo activities ===
Yuna officially debuted with Itzy in February 2019, with the release of their first single album, It'z Different, and the music video for its lead single "Dalla Dalla". One month after debut, she placed second in the Korean Business Research Institute's brand reputation ranking for individual girl group members, behind only Blackpink's Jennie. On December 22, 2021, Yuna won the "Best Weekly Idol Individual Cam (Female)" award at the 2021 K-Champ Awards.

In December 2022, Yuna performed a solo cover of Lee Hyori's "U-Go-Girl" at the 2022 KBS Song Festival: Y2K. The performance was regarded as a highlight and became the event's most viewed solo act. Lee praised Yuna's cover during Itzy's appearance on The Seasons, saying she enjoyed seeing younger artists recreating her past performances.

In December 2023, Yuna performed a cover of Jennie's "You & Me" at the 2023 SBS Gayo Daejeon, where her solo performance was once again praised as one of the highlights of the event. On December 27, she released the music video for "Yet, but", her solo track from Itzy's eighth EP Born to Be.

In December 2024, Yuna performed a cover of Alaina Castillo's "Pocket Locket" with Aespa's Karina and Nmixx's Sullyoon at the 2024 MBC Music Festival. Alongside Jang Won-young, the trio is recognized as the main visuals of their fourth-generation girl groups and nicknamed "Jang-Ka-Sull-Yu" by fans, which heightened anticipation for their appearance at the event. Their performance was well received and helped boost the song's popularity in South Korea.

=== 2025–present: Acting debut and solo debut ===
On July 1, 2025, Yuna was cast in the 2026 tvN retro office drama Undercover Miss Hong for her acting debut, portraying Hong Jang-mi, the spirited younger sister of the protagonist. She was also cast in the 2026 tvN romance drama My Bias, My Boss, portraying a top actress.

On March 23, 2026, Yuna released her debut solo EP, Ice Cream, alongside a music video for its lead single of the same name.

== Other ventures ==
=== Fashion and endorsements ===
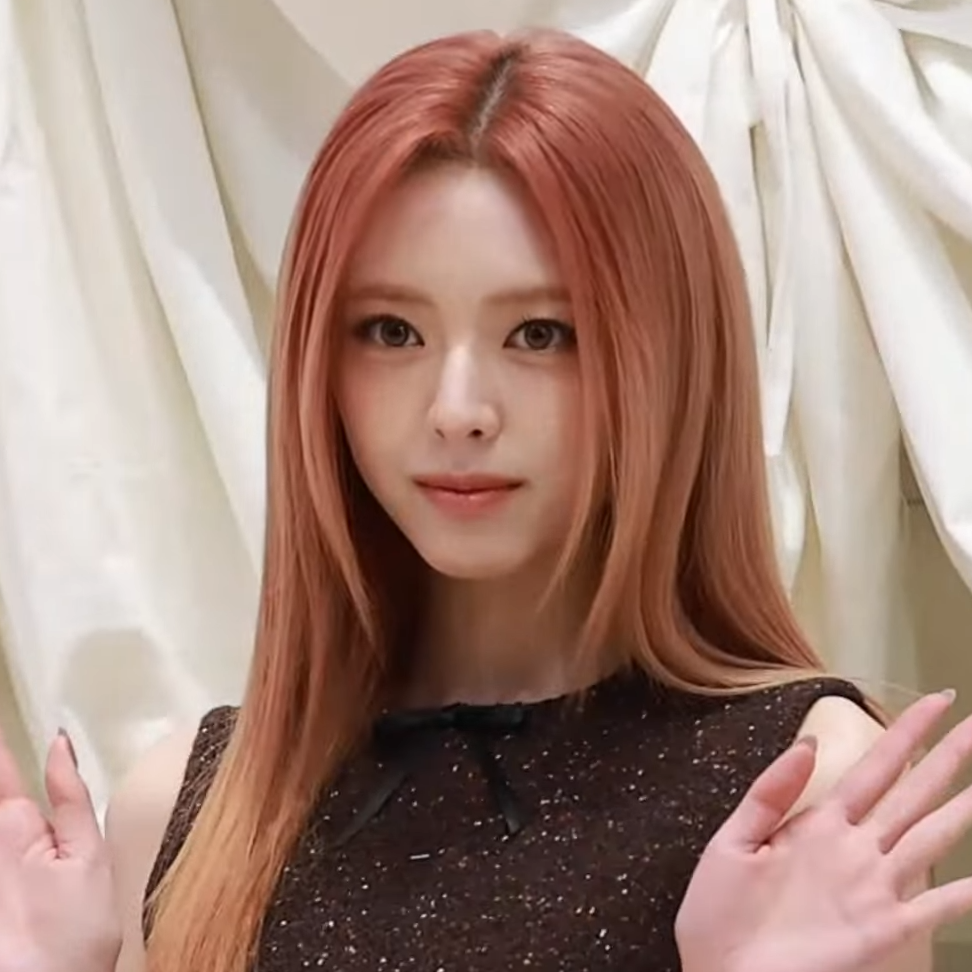
Yuna at the Suecomma Bonnie pop-up event in Seoul, 2025

In September 2024, Yuna attended Paris Fashion Week as a guest of Danish fashion brand Ganni for the showcase of their Spring/Summer 2025 collection. In November, she fronted MLB's winter campaign and appeared in Vogue Korea's November issue, modeling streetwear-inspired padded jackets and accessories photographed by Yun Song-i. Later that month, she was named the muse for the Korean cosmetics brand Naming.

In January 2025, Yuna was selected as the muse for Dynafit's Spring/Summer 2025 women's line, promoting the campaign slogan "Now Begin" to encourage fitness journeys. In February, she attended Coach's Fall/Winter 2025 collection launch in Manhattan, where she was profiled by Lee Jaehee for Elle Korea.

In March 2026, Yuna was selected as the global ambassador for Infinix Mobile.

== Discography ==
=== Extended plays ===
List of extended plays, showing selected details, peak chart positions and sales
Title	Details	Peak chart positions		Sales
Title	Details	KOR	US World	Sales
Ice Cream	Released: March 23, 2026; Label: JYP; Formats: CD, digital download, streaming	2	12	KOR: 158,229

=== Singles ===
==== As lead artist ====
Title	Year	Peak chart positions		Album
Title	Year	KOR	CHN KOR	Album
"Ice Cream"	2026	121	9	Ice Cream

=== Other charted songs ===
List of other charted songs, showing year released, selected chart positions, and name of the album
Title	Year	Peak chart positions		Album
Title	Year	KOR DL	CHN KOR	Album
"Yet, but" (Note: credited to Itzy, but the track is a solo by Yuna)	2024	50		Born to Be
"B-Boy"	2026	42	75	Ice Cream
"Blue Maze"	2026	46	70	Ice Cream
"Hyper Dream"	2026	45	86	Ice Cream
"Tangerine" (Note: credited to Itzy, but the track is a solo by Yuna)	2026	59	16	Motto

=== Composition credits ===
Composition credits are registered with the Korea Music Copyright Association.

Title	Year	Artist	Album	Composer	Lyricist	Ref.
"Yet, but"	2024	Herself	Born To Be	Yes	Yes	
"Focus"	2025	Itzy	Tunnel Vision	No	Yes	

== Videography ==
=== Music videos ===
List of music videos, showing year released, and directors
Year	Title	Director(s)	Ref.
2023	"Yet, but"	Ha Jeong-hoon, Lee Hye-sung (Hattrick)	
2026	"Ice Cream"	Minha Hwang (Rigend)	

=== Other appearances ===
Year	Title	Artist	Notes	Ref.
2017	Love Yourself Highlight Reel	BTS	Jung Kook's friend	

== Filmography ==
=== Television series ===
Year	Title	Role	Notes	Ref.
2026	Undercover Miss Hong	Hong Jang-mi	Special appearance	
2026	My Bias, My Boss	Yoon Choi		

=== Television shows ===
Year	Title	Role	Notes	Ref.
2017	Stray Kids		Pre-debut	
2021	SBS Gayo Daejeon	Host	with Key and Boom	
