= Chaeryeong =

South Korean singer and dancer (born 2001)

- Chaeryeong in 2026
- Born: Lee Chae-ryeong; June 5, 2001 (age 25); Yongin, South Korea
- Education: Hanlim Multi Art School
- Occupations: Singer; dancer
- Years active: 2013–present
- Relatives: Lee Chae-yeon (sister)
- Musical career
- Genres: K-pop; J-pop
- Instrument: Vocals
- Years active: 2019–present
- Label: JYP
- Member of: Itzy

Korean name
- Hangul: 이채령
- RR: I Chaeryeong
- MR: I Ch'aeryŏng

Signature
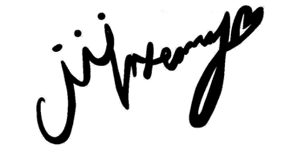

Lee Chae-ryeong (Korean: 이채령; born June 5, 2001), known mononymously as Chaeryeong, is a South Korean singer and dancer. She is a member of the South Korean girl group Itzy, formed by JYP Entertainment in 2019. Chaeryeong released her debut solo extended play (EP), Lovesick, in November 2026.

== Early life ==
Lee Chae-ryeong was born on June 5, 2001, in Yongin, South Korea. She is the younger sister of singer Lee Chaeyeon, who was a member of the girl group Iz*One. She attended high school at Hanlim Multi Art School, where she studied musical theatre alongside Ryujin.

== Career ==
=== 2013–2017: Pre-debut ===
In 2013, Chaeryeong appeared as a contestant on the third season of K-pop Star alongside her sister Chaeyeon. Both were praised for their dancing skills and soon became trainees at JYP Entertainment. In 2015, the sisters participated in Mnet's reality girl group survival show Sixteen, which determined the lineup for the girl group Twice. In 2017, she appeared in the first episode of Stray Kids alongside her future groupmates Yeji, Ryujin, and Yuna.

=== 2019–present: Debut with Itzy and solo debut ===
Chaeryeong officially debuted with Itzy in February 2019, with the release of their first single album, It'z Different, and the music video for its lead single "Dalla Dalla". In August 2021, she was selected as Studio Choom's "Artist of the Month" and performed a solo dance cover of Camila Cabello's "Cry for Me".

In June 2023, she featured on the track "Doremifasolatido" from Lee Chan-hyuk's album Umbrella. In November, Chaeryeong and groupmate Yeji appeared as mentors on SBS's reality survival series Universe Ticket. On December 25, she released the music video for "Mine", her solo track from Itzy's eighth EP Born to Be. The song debuted at number 51 on the Circle Download Chart. On December 19, 2024, she released the track "21" for the series Who Is She.

On October 18, 2026, JYP Entertainment announced that she would make her solo debut with the extended play Lovesick on November 9.

== Other ventures ==
=== Fashion ===
In March 2023, Chaeryeong made her solo fashion debut with a pictorial in Marie Claire Korea. Later, in November, she featured in Elle Korea's December 2023 issue.

=== Philanthropy ===
In March 2025, Chaeryeong donated ₩20 million to support victims and firefighters affected by wildfires in Ulsan, North Gyeongsang, and South Gyeongsang. The donation was made through the Hope Bridge Korea Disaster Relief Association and the Korea Fire Officers' Mutual Aid Association.

== Discography ==
=== Extended plays ===
List of extended plays, showing selected details, selected chart positions, and sales figures
Title	Details	Peak chart positions	Sales
Title	Details	KOR	Sales
Lovesick	Released: November 9, 2026; Label: JYP; Formats: CD, digital download, streaming	14	KOR: 93,765

=== Singles ===
List of singles, showing year released, selected chart positions and album name
Title	Year	Peak chart positions	Album
Title	Year	KOR	Album
"Lovesick"	2026	177	Lovesick

=== Soundtrack appearances ===
List of soundtrack appearances, showing year released, selected chart positions and album name
Title	Year	Peak chart positions	Album
Title	Year	KOR DL	Album
"21"	2024	138	Who Is She OST
"Midnight Glow"	2026	81	No Tail to Tell OST

=== Other charted songs ===
List of other charted songs, with selected chart positions, showing year released and album title
Title	Year	Peak chart positions	Album
Title	Year	KOR DL	Album
"Mine" (Note: credited to Itzy, but the track is a solo by Chaeryeong)	2024	51	Born to Be
"Undefined" (Note: credited to Itzy, but the track is a solo by Chaeryeong)	2026	66	Motto

=== Guest appearances ===
Title	Year	Artist	Album
"Doremifasolatido"	2023	Lee Chan-hyuk	Umbrella

=== Songwriting credits ===
All song credits are adapted from the Korea Music Copyright Association's database unless stated otherwise.

List of songs, showing year released, artist name, and name of the album
Year	Artist	Song	Album	Lyricist		Composition		Ref.
Year	Artist	Song	Album	Credited	With	Credited	With	Ref.
2024	Itzy	"Mine"	Born to Be	Yes	Selah	Yes	Lee Woo-bin "collapsedone", Justin Reinstein, Anna Timgren	
2025	Itzy	"Focus"	Tunnel Vision	Yes	Yeji, Lia, Ryujin, Yuna, Noday	No	—N/a	
2026	Herself	"Favorite Reason"	Lovesick	Yes	Lee Yeon (ARTiffect)	No	—N/a	

== Videography ==
=== Music videos ===
List of music videos, showing year released, and directors
Title	Year	Director(s)	Ref.
"Mine"	2023	Lee Hye-sung, Ha Jeong-hoon (Hattrick)	
"Lovesick"	2026	Guzza	

== Filmography ==
=== Television shows ===
Year	Title	Role	Ref.
2013–2014	K-pop Star 3	Contestant	
2015	Sixteen	Contestant	
2017	Stray Kids	Participant	
2023	Universe Ticket	Mentor	

=== Web shows ===
Year	Title	Role	Ref.
2023	Chaeryeong goes to K University	Host	
2024	Chaeryeong Making Friends	Host	
2025	Life Update	Host	
