= Air (EP) =

- Digital cover

EP by Yeji
- Released: March 10, 2025
- Genre: K-pop
- Length: 12:15
- Language: Korean
- Labels: JYP; Republic

Singles from Air
- 1. "Air" Released: March 10, 2025

Air is the debut solo extended play (EP) by South Korean singer Yeji of the girl group Itzy. It was released by JYP Entertainment on March 10, 2025, and features four tracks, including the lead single of the same name.

== Background and release ==
On January 17, 2025, it was announced that Yeji was preparing for her solo debut. On February 10, JYP Entertainment released a trailer for Yeji's debut EP, Air. Four days later, the tracklist was unveiled, confirming "Air" as the lead single. This was followed by a series of concept photos and short films promoting the album. On March 3, a highlight medley previewing the EP's songs was released. Music video teasers for the lead single were unveiled on March 5 and 7. Finally, on March 10, Yeji released her first EP, Air, along with a music video for its lead single of the same name.

== Theme and composition ==
"The message of "Air" is about showcasing my presence, my aura, through my first solo debut. There's a lyric that says, 'You take my breath away', and when I think about those overwhelming moments, they were always on stage. That's the message I wanted to convey."

— Yeji, on the theme of "Air"

Yeji contributed to the lyrics of the title track, which aims to convey the immersive experience she has while performing on stage. The song blends synth-pop elements with a strong bassline and a catchy hook. "Invasion" is an island-inspired track; "Can't Slow Me, No" brings high-energy beats infused with Latin rhythms; "258" closes the EP with "angelic vocals" layered over an uplifting beat.

== Critical reception ==
Professional ratings
Review scores
Source	Rating
IZM	2.5/5 stars

Chyenne Tatum of Grammy wrote that the EP "sees Yeji fully embrace the positively overwhelming sensations she feels when she's onstage". She described the lead single "Air" as having "dreamy synth-pop production", which is "immediately followed by three captivating tracks, "Invasion", "Can't Slow Me, No", and "258", that venture into some of the most tantalizing electronica and dance-pop sounds K-pop has heard in a long while".

NME ranked "Air", the title track, among the best K-pop songs of 2025. "Yeji’s solo debut was one of 2025's most satisfying surprises. Over dark electro beats, the Itzy leader plays with the idea of being breathless and enjoying it, conveying this tension with a vulnerability that becomes more intense as the song moves toward its climax".

== Track listing ==
Air track listing
No.	Title	Lyrics	Music	Arrangement	Length
1.	"Air"	J.Y. Park "The Asiansoul"; Yeji; Bang Hye-hyun (Jam Factory); 3! (Lalala Studio)	G'harah "PK" Degeddingseze; Tricia Battani; Kirsten Collins	Degeddingseze	3:15
2.	"Invasion"	Danke (Lalala Studio)	Degeddingseze; Tricia Battani; Kirsten Collins	Degeddingseze	2:48
3.	"Can't Slow Me, No"	Noday	Woo Min Lee "Collapsedone"; Justin Reinstein; Anna Timgren	Collapsedone; Reinstein	2:59
4.	"258"	Ryan S. Jhun; JQ	Jhun; Sorana; Jaro Omar; Inverness; Ferras	Jhun; Inverness; Ferras; Sorana; Omar	3:13
Total length:					12:15

== Charts ==
=== Weekly charts ===
Weekly chart performance for Air
Chart (2025)	Peak position
Greek Albums (IFPI)	33
Japanese Digital Albums (Oricon)	27
South Korean Albums (Circle)	3
US Top Album Sales (Billboard)	17
US World Albums (Billboard)	6

=== Monthly charts ===
Monthly chart performance for Air
Chart (2025)	Position
South Korean Albums (Circle)	8

=== Year-end charts ===
Year-end chart performance for Air
Chart (2025)	Position
South Korean Albums (Circle)	75

== Certifications ==
Certifications for Air
Region	Certification	Certified units/sales
South Korea (KMCA)	Platinum	250,000^{^}
^{^} Shipments figures based on certification alone.

== Release history ==
Release history for Air
Region	Date	Format	Label
Various	March 10, 2025	Digital download; streaming	JYP; Republic
South Korea	March 10, 2025	CD	JYP; Republic
United States	March 14, 2025	CD	JYP; Republic
Europe	March 14, 2025	CD	JYP; Republic
