= Yeji (singer) =

South Korean singer and dancer (born 2000)

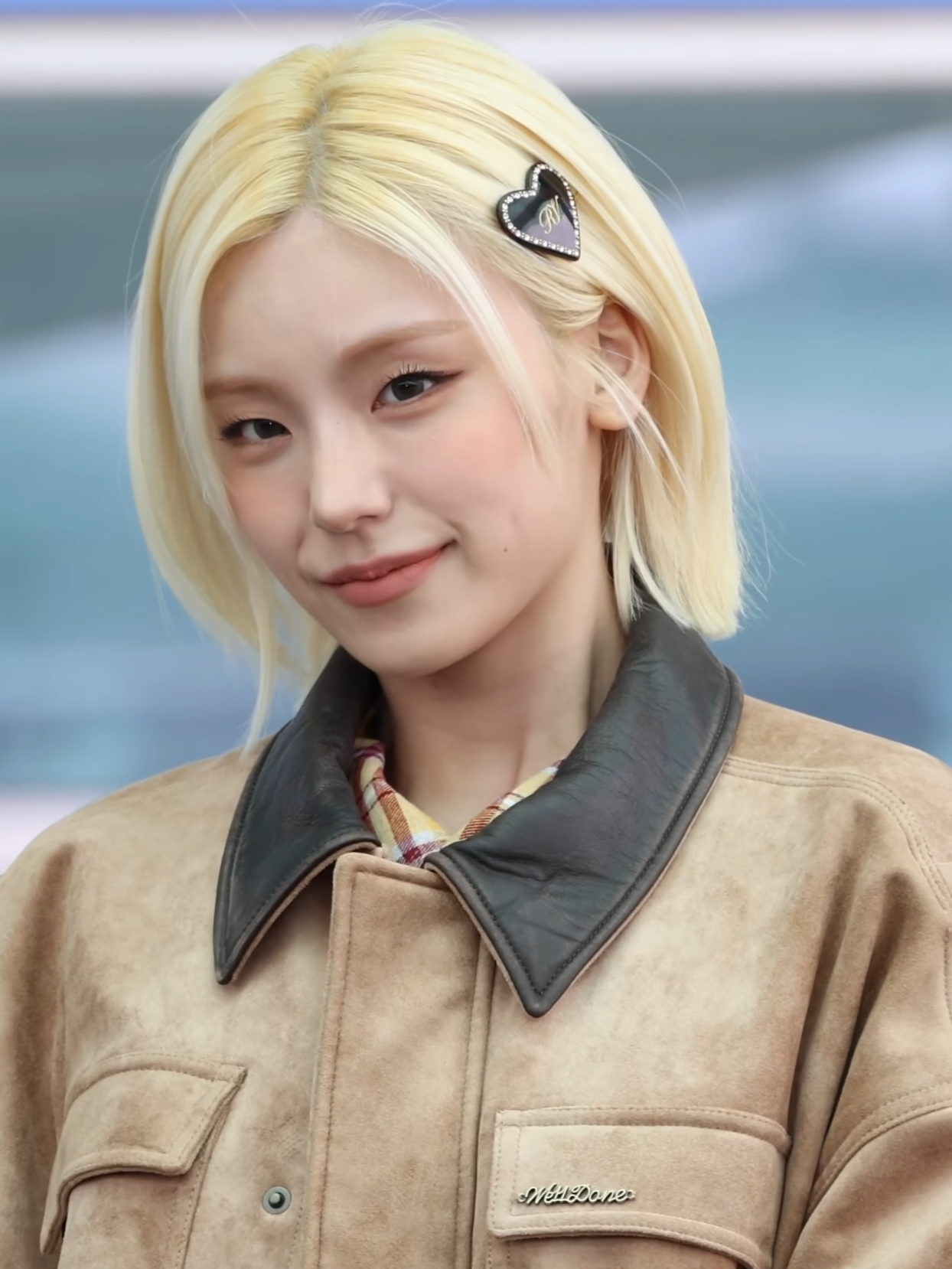
- Yeji in March 2026
- Born: Hwang Ye-ji; May 26, 2000 (age 26); Seoul, South Korea
- Education: Jeonju Commercial Information High School
- Occupations: Singer; dancer
- Musical career
- Genres: K-pop; J-pop
- Instrument: Vocals
- Years active: 2019–present
- Label: JYP
- Member of: Itzy

Korean name
- Hangul: 황예지
- RR: Hwang Yeji
- MR: Hwang Yeji

Signature
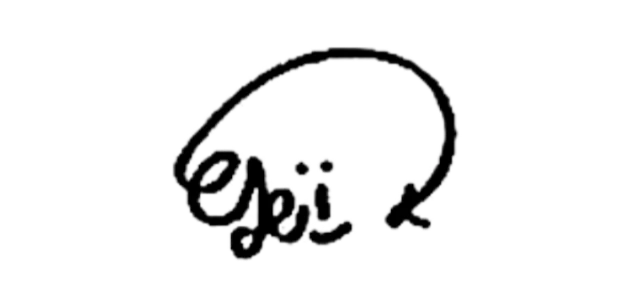

Hwang Ye-ji (Korean: 황예지; born May 26, 2000), known mononymously as Yeji, is a South Korean singer and dancer. She is the leader of the South Korean girl group Itzy, formed by JYP Entertainment in 2019. Yeji released her debut solo extended play (EP), Air, in March 2025.

== Early life ==
Hwang Ye-ji was born on May 26, 2000, in Seoul, South Korea, and grew up in Jeonju. While in elementary school, she dreamed of becoming a singer. Her older sister encouraged her to start dancing by showing her choreography from Wonder Girls' songs, which inspired her to enroll in a local dance academy. She later attended Jeonju Commercial Information High School.

== Career ==
=== 2015–2018: Pre-debut ===
In 2015, Yeji became a trainee at JYP Entertainment after auditioning with Twice's song "Like Ooh-Ahh". Later that year, she made a brief appearance as a backup dancer in episode 8 of the television drama Second 20s. In 2017, she appeared in the first episode of Stray Kids alongside her future groupmates Ryujin, Chaeryeong, and Yuna. The following year, she participated in SBS's The Fan, where 2PM's Junho introduced her as "JYP's secret weapon". Her performance gained positive attention, building anticipation ahead of her debut.

=== 2019–present: Itzy and solo debut ===
On January 20, 2019, Yeji was revealed as the leader of Itzy. The group officially debuted on February 12, 2019, with the release of their first single album, It'z Different, and the music video for its lead single "Dalla Dalla". On August of the year, Yeji claimed the 1st spot in the Korean Business Research Institute's brand reputation ranking for individual girl group members. On March 19, 2021, Yeji was selected as Studio Choom's "Artist of the Month", during which she covered "River" by Bishop Briggs and shared insights into her dance journey. In June 2022, Yeji and fellow member Ryujin performed Bebe Rexha's "Break My Heart Myself" in Studio Choom's "Mix & Max" series.

She continued her solo activities in May 2023 with a video cover of "Uchiage Hanabi (Fireworks)" by Daoko and Kenshi Yonezu. In November, Yeji and groupmate Chaeryeong appeared as mentors on SBS's reality survival series Universe Ticket. On December 20, she released the music video for "Crown On My Head", her solo track from Itzy's eighth EP Born To Be. In September 2024, Yeji released a cover of IU's "Strawberry Moon". On December 1, she released her first OST, "Think about you", for the romantic comedy series Love Your Enemy.

On January 17, 2025, it was announced that Yeji would be making her solo debut. On March 10, she released her first EP, Air, along with a music video for its lead single of the same name. She co-wrote the lead single's lyrics to convey the intense immersion she experiences while performing on stage.

== Other ventures ==
=== Fashion and endorsements ===
In 2023, Yeji appeared on the cover of the April issue of W Korea. The following month, she featured on the cover of Elle Korea alongside labelmate Felix. In 2024, she appeared in the August issue of Allure Korea. In September, she attended Dolce & Gabbana's Spring/Summer 2025 show at Milan Fashion Week. On December 10, 2024, Yeji was chosen to attend the pop-up store opening of South Korean makeup brand Tirtir in Seongsu-dong, Seoul.

In February 2025, Yeji was announced as a brand ambassador for Roger Vivier. In April, she appeared in the brand's "Un Été à Paris" Summer 2025 campaign, which featured her modeling Belle Vivier accessories at the Pont Neuf and various Parisian gardens. The same month, she was featured in Harper's Bazaar Korea. She was also featured in the October 2025 issue of Elle Hong Kong.

=== Philanthropy ===
In March 2025, Yeji donated ₩50 million (US$37,500) to the Hope Bridge Korea Disaster Relief Association to aid wildfire victims and firefighters in Ulsan, Gyeongbuk, and Gyeongnam, South Korea.

== Discography ==
=== Extended plays ===
List of extended plays, showing selected details, selected chart positions, sales figures, and certifications
Title	Details	Peak chart positions		Sales	Certifications
Title	Details	KOR	US World	Sales	Certifications
Air	Released: March 10, 2025; Label: JYP; Formats: CD, digital download, streaming	3	6	KOR: 326,710	KMCA: Platinum

=== Singles ===
==== As lead artist ====
List of singles as lead artist, showing year released, selected chart positions and album name
Title	Year	Peak chart positions		Album
Title	Year	KOR	US World	Album
"Air"	2025	102	9	Air

==== As featured artist ====
List of singles as featured artist, showing year released, selected chart positions and album name
Title	Year	Peak chart positions	Album
Title	Year	KOR DL	Album
"Break My Heart Myself" (Bebe Rexha featuring Yeji and Ryujin)	2022	120	Non-album single

=== Soundtrack appearances ===
List of soundtrack appearances, showing year released, selected chart positions and album name
Title	Year	Peak chart positions	Album
Title	Year	KOR DL	Album
"Think About You"	2024	67	Love Your Enemy OST

=== Other charted songs ===
List of other charted songs, showing year released, selected chart positions, and name of the album
Title	Year	Peak chart positions	Album
Title	Year	KOR DL	Album
"Crown on My Head" (Note: credited to Itzy, but the track is a solo by Yeji)	2024	43	Born to Be
"Invasion"	2025	68	Air
"Can't Slow Me, No"	2025	71	Air
"258"	2025	67	Air
"Pocket" (Note: credited to Itzy, but the track is a solo by Yeji)	2026	15	Motto

=== Composition credits ===
All song credits are adapted from the Korea Music Copyright Association's database unless stated otherwise.

List of songs, showing year released, artist name, and name of the album
Year	Artist	Song	Album	Lyricist		Composition		Ref.
Year	Artist	Song	Album	Credited	With	Credited	With	Ref.
2024	Herself	"Crown on My Head"	Born to Be	Yes	Friday (Galactika), Jvde (Galactika)	Yes	War of Stars (Galactika), Pablo (Galactika), Woobin	
2025	Herself	"Air"	Air	Yes	J.Y. Park "The Asiansoul", Beong Hye-hyeon, 3! (Lalala Studio)	No	N/A	
2025	Itzy	"Focus"	Tunnel Vision	Yes	Lia, Ryujin, Chaeryeong, Yuna, Noday	No	N/A	

== Videography ==
=== Music videos ===
List of music videos, showing year released, and directors
Title	Year	Director(s)	Ref.
"Crown on My Head"	2023	Ha Jeong-hoon, Lee Hye-sung (Hattrick)	
"Air"	2025	Song Taejong	

== Filmography ==
=== Television shows ===
Year	Title	Role	Notes	Ref.
2017	Stray Kids	Participant	Appeared in episode 1	
2018	The Fan	Contestant	Eliminated in the 5th episode.	
2023	Universe Ticket	Mentor		

=== Hosting ===
Year	Title	Notes	Ref.
2021	Show! Music Core	Special MC	
