= TvN (South Korean TV channel) =

South Korean television network

tvN
- Logo used since 2021
- Country: South Korea
- Broadcast area: South Korea; Southeast Asia
- Headquarters: CJ E&M Center, 66 Sangamsan-ro, Sangam-dong, Mapo District, Seoul, South Korea

Programming
- Language: Korean
- Picture format: 1080i HDTV

Ownership
- Owner: CJ ENM Entertainment Division (CJ Group)
- Key people: Kang Ho-sung (President & CEO)
- Sister channels: tvN Drama; tvN Show; tvN Story; tvN Sports; tvN Asia

History
- Launched: October 9, 2006; 20 years ago
- Former names: Channel M (Asian feed)

Links
- Website: tvn.cjenm.com

Availability

Streaming media
- TVING (South Korea): Live C00551

tvN (originally standing for Total Variety Network) is a South Korean nationwide pay television network owned by CJ ENM Entertainment Division. tvN programming consists of a variety of entertainment content focused on television series and variety shows. It is available on cable, on satellite through SkyLife, and on IPTV platforms in South Korea. Since 2014, the network has been headed by Kang Ho-sung. From June 28, 2010, to April 30, 2013, tvN Go was broadcast by renting a channel from Korea DMB.

== Logos ==
2006–08

2008–12

2012–21

since 2021

== Dramas ==
tvN dramas are exported to various countries globally. tvN's highest-rated television drama series are Queen of Tears, Crash Landing on You, Reply 1988 and Guardian: The Lonely and Great God. The final episode of Queen of Tears earned a 24.850% nationwide audience share, making it the third highest ratings recorded by a Korean cable television drama. While Crash Landing on You became the first tvN drama to cross 20% ratings, and was critically acclaimed for its screenplay, direction and performances. Reply 1988 received both critical and audience acclaim, with its finale episode achieved an 18.8% nationwide audience share and making it the highest rated drama in Korean cable television history for the next three years. In addition, Guardian: The Lonely and Great God was also a hit and consistently topped cable television viewership ratings in its time slot. Its final episode recorded an 18.680% nationwide audience share, the second highest ratings of a Korean cable television drama at the time. It received critical acclaim and became a cultural phenomenon in South Korea.

To date, tvN dramas hold 28 spots of the 50 on the list of highest-rated Korean dramas in cable television. The following dramas aired on tvN, with the highest average audience share ratings (nationwide).

=== Household viewership ratings ===
Top 20 series per nationwide household rating
#	Series	Nationwide household rating (Nielsen)	Final episode date	Ref.
1	Queen of Tears	24.850%	April 28, 2024	
2	Crash Landing on You	21.683%	February 16, 2020	
3	Reply 1988	18.803%	January 16, 2016	
4	Guardian: The Lonely and Great God	18.680%	January 21, 2017	
5	Mr. Sunshine	18.129%	September 30, 2018	
6	Mr. Queen	17.371%	February 14, 2021	
7	Bon Appétit, Your Majesty	17.107%	September 28, 2025	
8	Crash Course in Romance	17.038%	March 5, 2023	
9	Under the Queen's Umbrella	16.852%	December 4, 2022	
10	Jeongnyeon: The Star Is Born	16.458%	November 17, 2024	
11	Vincenzo	14.636%	May 2, 2021	
12	Our Blues	14.597%	June 12, 2022	
13	100 Days My Prince	14.412%	October 30, 2018	
14	Hospital Playlist	14.142%	May 28, 2020	
15	Hospital Playlist 2	14.080%	September 16, 2021	
16	Undercover Miss Hong	13.121%	March 8, 2026	
17	Hometown Cha-Cha-Cha	12.665%	October 17, 2021	
18	Signal	12.544%	March 12, 2016	
19	Hotel del Luna	12.001%	September 1, 2019	
20	Marry My Husband	11.951%	February 20, 2024	

=== Viewers count ===
Top 20 series per nationwide viewers (million) since 2018 (Note: The number of viewers was released on Nielsen starting January 2018.)
#	Series	Nationwide viewers number in million (Nielsen)	Final episode date	Ref.
1	Queen of Tears	6.399	April 28, 2024	
2	Crash Landing on You	6.337	February 16, 2020	
3	Mr. Queen	4.749	February 14, 2021	
4	Mr. Sunshine	4.631	September 30, 2018	
5	Crash Course in Romance	4.329	March 5, 2023	
6	Bon Appétit, Your Majesty	4.213	September 28, 2025	
7	Under the Queen's Umbrella	4.029	December 4, 2022	
8	Hospital Playlist 2	3.853	September 16, 2021	
9	Vincenzo	3.841	May 2, 2021	
10	Jeongnyeon: The Star Is Born	3.840	November 17, 2024	
11	Hotel del Luna	3.674	September 1, 2019	
12	Our Blues	3.419	June 12, 2022	
13	100 Days My Prince	3.264	October 30, 2018	
14	Hometown Cha-Cha-Cha	3.237	October 17, 2021	
15	Undercover Miss Hong	3.131	March 8, 2026	
16	Prison Playbook	3.063	January 18, 2018	
17	Twenty-Five Twenty-One	3.047	April 3, 2022	
18	Marry My Husband	2.938	February 20, 2024	
19	Memories of the Alhambra	2.853	January 20, 2019	
20	Little Women	2.618	October 9, 2022	
