= List of awards and nominations received by Itzy =

Itzy awards and nominations
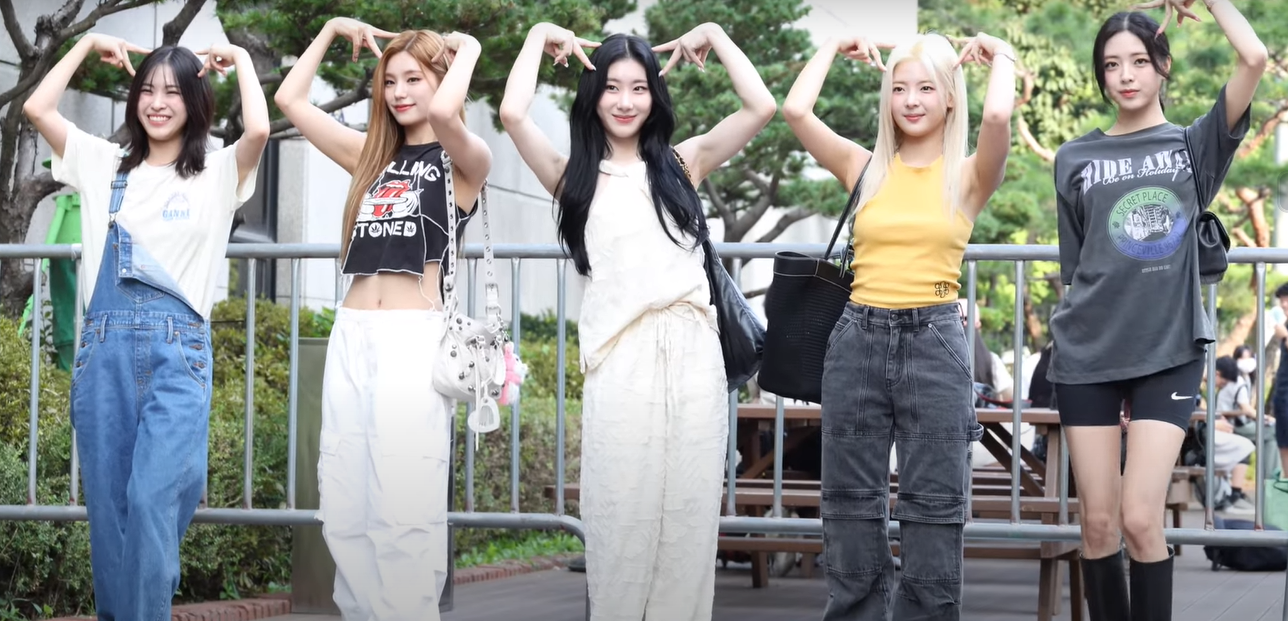
- Itzy in August 2023
Awards and nominations
Award	Wins	Nominations
Asia Artist Awards	6	11
Asian Pop Music Awards	5	14
Brand Customer Loyalty Awards	0	1
Brand of the Year Awards	1	1
Circle Chart Music Awards	3	16
Dong-A.com's Pick	1	1
The Fact Music Awards	5	9
Genie Music Awards	1	4
Golden Disc Awards	3	17
Hanteo Music Awards	1	6
Japan Gold Disc Awards	1	1
Joox Indonesia Music Awards	0	1
Joox Thailand Music Awards	0	2
K-Global Heart Dream Awards	1	1
Korea First Brand Awards	1	1
Korean Music Awards	0	2
MAMA Awards	2	15
Melon Music Awards	1	4
MTV Europe Music Awards	0	1
MTV Video Music Awards	0	1
Seoul Music Awards	2	22
Soribada Best K-Music Awards	2	3
TMElive International Music Awards	1	1
V Live Awards	1	2

Totals (Note: Certain award groups do not simply award one winner. They acknowledge several different recipients, have runners-up, and have third place. Since this is a specific recognition and is different from losing an award, runner-up mentions are considered wins in this award tally. For simplification and to avoid errors, each award in this list has been presumed to have had a prior nomination.)
- Wins: 38
- Nominations: 137

Itzy is a South Korean girl group formed by JYP Entertainment, consisting of members Yeji, Lia, Ryujin, Chaeryeong, and Yuna. Since their debut in 2019, the group has received numerous accolades, including three Circle Chart Music Awards, three Golden Disc Awards, two MAMA Awards, one Melon Music Award, and two Seoul Music Awards. They have also gained international recognition with nominations at the MTV Europe Music Awards and MTV Video Music Awards.

Itzy debuted with the single album It'z Different, featuring the lead single "Dalla Dalla". The track achieved commercial success and won the Digital Bonsang at the 34th Golden Disc Awards. The success of their debut led Itzy to make history as the first K-pop girl group to achieve a "Rookie Grand Slam", winning all major Rookie of the Year awards at the 34th Golden Disc Awards, 9th Gaon Chart Music Awards, 2019 Melon Music Awards, 2019 Mnet Asian Music Awards, and the 29th Seoul Music Awards. They also won Rookie of the Year at the 2019 Genie Music Awards and the 4th Asia Artist Awards, and were nominated for Best Korean Act at the 2019 MTV Europe Music Awards.

In 2020, Itzy released their third EP, It'z Me, with its lead single "Wannabe", which won the Digital Bonsang at the 35th Golden Disc Awards. Their first studio album, Crazy in Love, was released in 2021, with its lead single "Loco" earning the group their first nomination at the MTV Video Music Awards for Best K-Pop. In 2022, the group released their sixth EP, Cheshire, and won Artist of the Year at the 12th Circle Chart Music Awards. Since 2023, Itzy has received several awards and nominations, maintaining their presence both in South Korea and internationally.

== Awards and nominations ==
Name of the award ceremony, year presented, award category, nominee(s) of the award, and the result of the nomination
Award ceremony	Year	Category	Nominee(s)/work(s)	Result	Ref.
Asia Artist Awards	2019	Rookie of the Year – Music	Itzy	Won	
Asia Artist Awards	2019	Popularity Award – Music	Itzy	Nominated	
Asia Artist Awards	2019	StarNews Popularity Award – Female Group	Itzy	Nominated	
Asia Artist Awards	2020	Hot Issue Award – Music	Itzy	Won	
Asia Artist Awards	2020	Choice Award – Music	Itzy	Won	
Asia Artist Awards	2021	Best Musician Award	Itzy	Won	
Asia Artist Awards	2021	Popularity Award – Female Group	Itzy	Nominated	
Asia Artist Awards	2022	Asia Celebrity – Music	Itzy	Won	
Asia Artist Awards	2022	Best Artist Award – Music	Itzy	Won	
Asia Artist Awards	2023	Popularity Award – Singer (Female)	Itzy	Nominated	
Asia Artist Awards	2026	Popularity Award – Group (Female)	Itzy	Pending	
Asian Pop Music Awards (Note: Hosted by the Hong Kong Asia Pacific International Group and Sunway Records, the Asian Pop Music Awards bases its winners on the "Asian Pop Music Chart" which opened in September 2019.)	2020	Best Group (Overseas)	It'z Me	Nominated	
Asian Pop Music Awards	2021	Top 20 Albums of the Year (Overseas)	Crazy in Love	Won	
Asian Pop Music Awards	2021	Top 20 Songs of the Year (Overseas)	"In the Morning"	Won	
Asian Pop Music Awards	2021	Top 20 Songs of the Year (Overseas)	"Loco"	Won	
Asian Pop Music Awards	2021	Best Album of the Year (Overseas)	Crazy in Love	Nominated	
Asian Pop Music Awards	2021	Best Group (Overseas)	Crazy in Love	Nominated	
Asian Pop Music Awards	2021	Song of the Year (Overseas)	"In the Morning"	Nominated	
Asian Pop Music Awards	2022	Top 20 Albums of the Year (Overseas)	Checkmate	Won	
Asian Pop Music Awards	2022	Best Album of the Year (Overseas)	Checkmate	Nominated	
Asian Pop Music Awards	2022	Best Group (Overseas)	Checkmate	Nominated	
Asian Pop Music Awards	2022	Song of the Year (Overseas)	"Sneakers"	Nominated	
Asian Pop Music Awards	2023	Top 20 Songs of the Year (Overseas)	"Cake"	Won	
Asian Pop Music Awards	2023	Song of the Year (Overseas)	"Cake"	Nominated	
Asian Pop Music Awards	2023	Best Group (Overseas)	Kill My Doubt	Nominated	
Brand Customer Loyalty Awards	2021	Best Female Idol Group	Itzy	Nominated	
Brand of the Year Awards	2019	Female Rookie Idol of the Year	Itzy	Won	
Circle Chart Music Awards	2020	New Artist of the Year – Digital	Itzy	Won	
Circle Chart Music Awards	2020	New Artist of the Year – Album	Itzy	Nominated	
Circle Chart Music Awards	2020	Artist of the Year – Digital Music (February)	"Dalla Dalla"	Nominated	
Circle Chart Music Awards	2020	Artist of the Year – Digital Music (July)	"Icy"	Nominated	
Circle Chart Music Awards	2021	World K-Pop Rookie	Itzy	Won	
Circle Chart Music Awards	2021	Artist of the Year – Digital Music (March)	"Wannabe"	Nominated	
Circle Chart Music Awards	2021	Artist of the Year – Digital Music (August)	"Not Shy"	Nominated	
Circle Chart Music Awards	2021	Mubeat Global Choice Award – Female	Itzy	Nominated	
Circle Chart Music Awards	2022	Artist of the Year – Digital Music (April)	"In the Morning"	Nominated	
Circle Chart Music Awards	2022	Artist of the Year – Digital Music (September)	"Loco"	Nominated	
Circle Chart Music Awards	2022	Mubeat Global Choice Award – Female	Itzy	Nominated	
Circle Chart Music Awards	2023	Artist of the Year – Global Digital Music (November)	"Cheshire"	Won	
Circle Chart Music Awards	2023	Artist of the Year – Global Digital Music (July)	"Sneakers"	Nominated	
Circle Chart Music Awards	2023	Artist of the Year – Physical Album (4th Quarter)	Cheshire	Nominated	
Circle Chart Music Awards	2023	Mubeat Global Choice Award – Female	Itzy	Nominated	
Circle Chart Music Awards	2024	Mubeat Global Choice Award – Female	Itzy	Nominated	
Dong-A.com's Pick	2019	Idol Expected to Grow Well	Itzy	Won	
The Fact Music Awards	2019	Next Leader	Itzy	Won	
The Fact Music Awards	2020	Best Performer	Itzy	Won	
The Fact Music Awards	2020	TMA Popularity Award	Itzy	Nominated	
The Fact Music Awards	2021	Artist of the Year (Bonsang)	Itzy	Won	
The Fact Music Awards	2021	Fan N Star Choice Artist	Itzy	Nominated	
The Fact Music Awards	2022	Artist of the Year (Bonsang)	Itzy	Won	
The Fact Music Awards	2023	Artist of the Year (Bonsang)	Itzy	Won	
The Fact Music Awards	2023	Best Music – Fall	"Cake"	Nominated	
The Fact Music Awards	2023	Idolplus Popularity Award	Itzy	Nominated	
Genie Music Awards	2019	The Female New Artist	Itzy	Won	
Genie Music Awards	2019	The Top Artist	Itzy	Nominated	
Genie Music Awards	2019	Genie Music Popularity Award	Itzy	Nominated	
Genie Music Awards	2019	Global Popularity Award	Itzy	Nominated	
Golden Disc Awards	2020	Best Digital Song (Bonsang)	"Dalla Dalla"	Won	
Golden Disc Awards	2020	Rookie of the Year Award	Itzy	Won	
Golden Disc Awards	2020	Song of the Year (Daesang)	"Dalla Dalla"	Nominated	
Golden Disc Awards	2020	Popularity Award	Itzy	Nominated	
Golden Disc Awards	2020	NetEase Music Fans' Choice K-pop Star Award	Itzy	Nominated	
Golden Disc Awards	2021	Best Digital Song (Bonsang)	"Wannabe"	Won	
Golden Disc Awards	2021	Song of the Year (Daesang)	"Wannabe"	Nominated	
Golden Disc Awards	2021	Best Album (Bonsang)	Not Shy	Nominated	
Golden Disc Awards	2021	QQ Music Popularity Award	Itzy	Nominated	
Golden Disc Awards	2021	Curaprox Popularity Award	Itzy	Nominated	
Golden Disc Awards	2022	Best Album (Bonsang)	Crazy in Love	Nominated	
Golden Disc Awards	2022	Best Digital Song (Bonsang)	"In the Morning"	Nominated	
Golden Disc Awards	2022	Seezn Most Popular Artist Award	Itzy	Nominated	
Golden Disc Awards	2023	Best Album (Bonsang)	Checkmate	Nominated	
Golden Disc Awards	2023	TikTok Most Popular Artist Award	Itzy	Nominated	
Golden Disc Awards	2024	Best Album (Bonsang)	Kill My Doubt	Nominated	
Golden Disc Awards	2024	Bugs Most Popular Artist Award (Female)	Itzy	Nominated	
Hanteo Music Awards	2021	Artist Award – Female Group	Itzy	Won	
Hanteo Music Awards	2021	WhosFandom Award	Itzy	Nominated	
Hanteo Music Awards	2023	Artist of the Year	Itzy	Nominated	
Hanteo Music Awards	2023	WhosFandom Award	Itzy	Nominated	
Hanteo Music Awards	2024	Artist of the Year	Itzy	Nominated	
Hanteo Music Awards	2024	WhosFandom Award	Itzy	Nominated	
Japan Gold Disc Awards	2021	Best 3 New Artists – Asia	Itzy	Won	
Joox Indonesia Music Awards	2021	Korean Artist of the Year	Itzy	Nominated	
Joox Thailand Music Awards	2022	Korean Song of the Year	"In the Morning"	Nominated	
Joox Thailand Music Awards	2022	Top Social Global Artist of the Year	Itzy	Nominated	
K-Global Heart Dream Awards	2023	K-Global Bonsang (Main Prize)	Itzy	Won	
Korea First Brand Awards (Note: Hosted by the Korea Consumer Brand Committee and the Korea Consumer Forum, the Korea First Brand Awards bases its winners on a nationwide South Korean survey.)	2019	New Female Artist	Itzy	Won	
Korean Music Awards	2020	Best Pop Song	"Dalla Dalla"	Nominated	
Korean Music Awards	2020	Rookie of the Year	Itzy	Nominated	
MAMA Awards	2019	Best New Female Artist	Itzy	Won	
MAMA Awards	2019	Artist of the Year	Itzy	Nominated	
MAMA Awards	2019	Favorite Female Artist	Itzy	Nominated	
MAMA Awards	2019	Worldwide Fans' Choice Top 10	Itzy	Nominated	
MAMA Awards	2020	Best Dance Performance Female Group	"Wannabe"	Nominated	
MAMA Awards	2020	Song of the Year	"Wannabe"	Nominated	
MAMA Awards	2020	Worldwide Fans' Choice Top 10	Itzy	Nominated	
MAMA Awards	2021	Best Dance Performance Female Group	"In the Morning"	Nominated	
MAMA Awards	2021	Best Female Group	Itzy	Nominated	
MAMA Awards	2021	Song of the Year	"In the Morning"	Nominated	
MAMA Awards	2021	Worldwide Fans' Choice Top 10	Itzy	Nominated	
MAMA Awards	2022	Artist of the Year	Itzy	Nominated	
MAMA Awards	2022	Best Female Group	Itzy	Nominated	
MAMA Awards	2022	Worldwide Fans' Choice Top 10	Itzy	Nominated	
MAMA Awards	2023	Worldwide Fans' Choice Top 10	Itzy	Nominated	
MAMA Awards	2025	Fans' Choice Top 10 – Female	Itzy	Won	
Melon Music Awards	2019	Best New Artist – Female	Itzy	Won	
Melon Music Awards	2019	Top 10 Artists	Itzy	Nominated	
Melon Music Awards	2019	Best Song Award	"Dalla Dalla"	Nominated	
Melon Music Awards	2019	Best Dance – Female	"Dalla Dalla"	Nominated	
MTV Europe Music Awards	2019	Best Korean Act	Itzy	Nominated	
MTV Video Music Awards	2022	Best K-Pop	"Loco"	Nominated	
Seoul Music Awards	2020	New Artist Award	Itzy	Won	
Seoul Music Awards	2020	Popularity Award	Itzy	Nominated	
Seoul Music Awards	2020	Hallyu Special Award	Itzy	Nominated	
Seoul Music Awards	2020	QQ Music Most Popular K-Pop Artist Award	Itzy	Nominated	
Seoul Music Awards	2021	Discovery of the Year	Itzy	Won	
Seoul Music Awards	2021	Bonsang Award	It'z Me	Nominated	
Seoul Music Awards	2021	Legend Rookie	Itzy	Nominated	
Seoul Music Awards	2021	Popularity Award	Itzy	Nominated	
Seoul Music Awards	2021	K-wave Popularity Award	Itzy	Nominated	
Seoul Music Awards	2022	Bonsang Award	Crazy in Love	Nominated	
Seoul Music Awards	2022	Popularity Award	Itzy	Nominated	
Seoul Music Awards	2022	K-wave Popularity Award	Itzy	Nominated	
Seoul Music Awards	2023	Bonsang Award	Checkmate	Nominated	
Seoul Music Awards	2023	Popularity Award	Itzy	Nominated	
Seoul Music Awards	2023	K-wave Popularity Award	Itzy	Nominated	
Seoul Music Awards	2024	Main Award (Bonsang)	Itzy	Nominated	
Seoul Music Awards	2024	Popularity Award	Itzy	Nominated	
Seoul Music Awards	2024	Hallyu Special Award	Itzy	Nominated	
Seoul Music Awards	2025	Main Prize (Bonsang)	Itzy	Nominated	
Seoul Music Awards	2025	Popularity Award	Itzy	Nominated	
Seoul Music Awards	2025	K-Wave Special Award	Itzy	Nominated	
Seoul Music Awards	2025	K-pop World Choice – Group	Itzy	Nominated	
Soribada Best K-Music Awards	2019	The Rookie Award	Itzy	Won	
Soribada Best K-Music Awards	2019	The Favorite Female Artist Award	Itzy	Nominated	
Soribada Best K-Music Awards	2020	New K-Wave Artist Award	Itzy	Won	
TMElive International Music Awards	2025	Best International Stage Performance	Itzy	Won	
V Live Awards	2019	Global Rookie Top 5	Itzy	Won	
V Live Awards	2019	The Most Loved Artist	Itzy	Nominated	
