= Cheshire (disambiguation) =

Cheshire is a county in the northwest of England.

Cheshire may also refer to:

== Places in the United States ==
- Cheshire, Connecticut
- Cheshire, Massachusetts
  - Cheshire (CDP), Massachusetts, a census-designated place
- Cheshire, Ohio, a village in Gallia County
- Cheshire, Delaware County, Ohio, an unincorporated community
- Cheshire, Oregon
- Cheshire County, New Hampshire
- Cheshire Township, Michigan
- Cheshire Township, Ohio

== Other ==
- Cheshire (UK Parliament constituency), former United Kingdom parliament constituency
- Cheshire (character), a villain in DC Comics
- Cheshire (passenger train), a named passenger train operated by the Boston & Maine railroad
- Cheshire (South), a former regional English rugby union league
- Cheshire (surname), a list of people with the name
- Cheshire cheese, a traditional cheese produced in Cheshire, England
- HMS Cheshire, a ship of the British Royal Navy 1927–1957
- Cheshire (EP), 2022 release from Itzy
  - "Cheshire" (song), 2022 song by Itzy
- A fictional character in video game Bayonetta Origins: Cereza and the Lost Demon

== See also ==
- Cheshire Bridge (disambiguation)
- Cheshire Cat (disambiguation)
