= List of Itzy concert tours =

Itzy concert tours
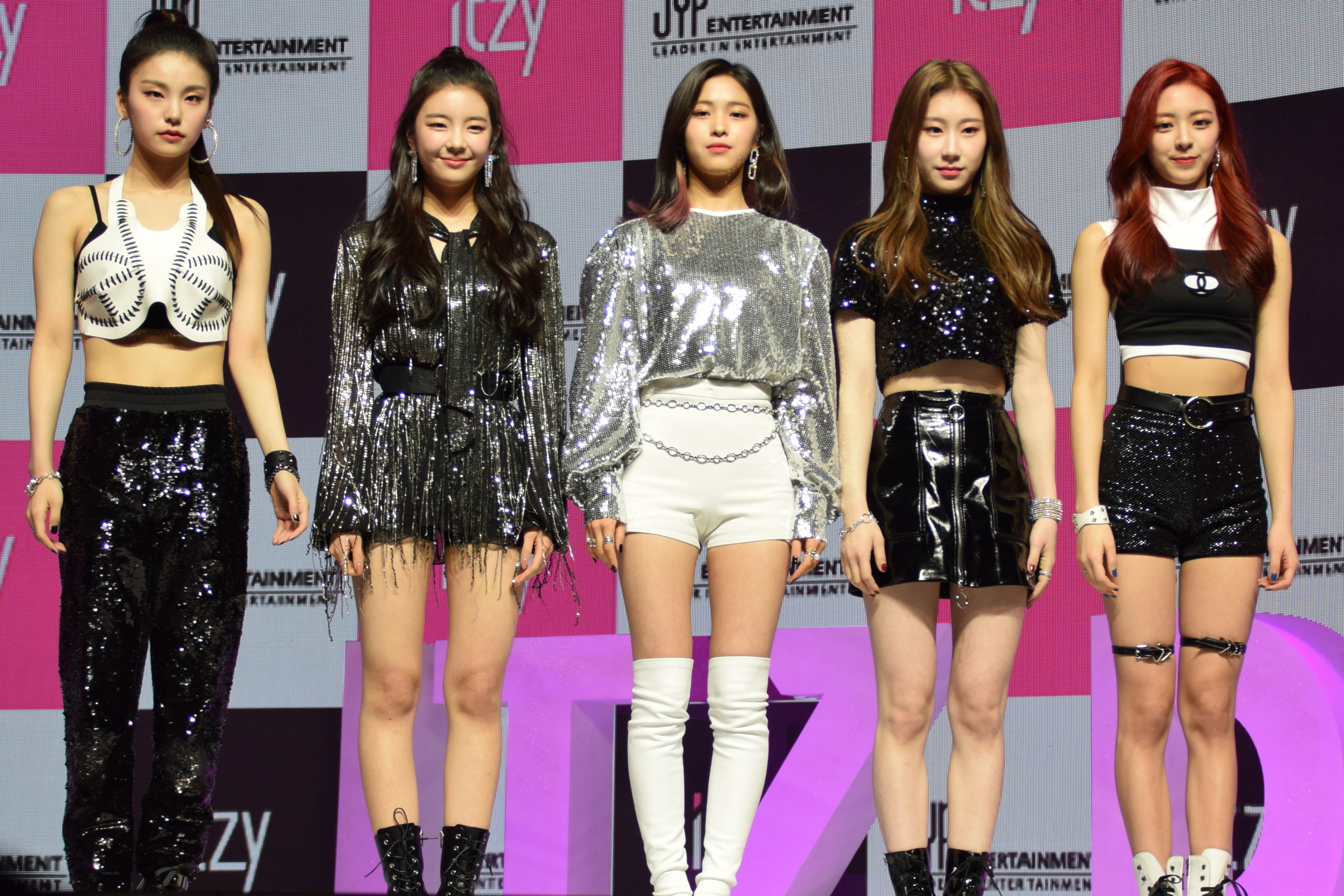
- Itzy in 2019
- Concert tours: 3
- Showcases: 2

South Korean girl group Itzy has performed in three concert tours and two official showcases since their debut in 2019.

The Checkmate World Tour (2022–2023), the group's debut concert tour, began in South Korea in August 2022 and later expanded to North America and other parts of Asia, supporting their fifth extended play (EP), Checkmate.

The Born to Be World Tour (2024), their second world tour, began in South Korea in February 2024 and included shows across Asia, Oceania, the Americas, and Europe, supporting their eighth EP, Born to Be.

The Tunnel Vision World Tour (2026), their third world tour, began in South Korea in February 2026 and is held in support of their eleventh EP, Tunnel Vision.

== Concert tours ==
Checkmate World Tour
- World tour by Itzy
- Associated album: Checkmate
- Start date: August 6, 2022
- End date: April 8, 2023
- Legs: 3
- No. of shows: 12 in Asia; 8 in North America; 20 in total

Itzy concert chronology
- Checkmate World Tour (2022–2023); Born to Be World Tour (2024)

=== Checkmate World Tour ===
The Checkmate World Tour was the first worldwide concert tour by South Korean girl group Itzy, held in support of their fifth EP, Checkmate (2022).

On June 2, 2022, JYP Entertainment announced that Itzy would return with new music in July and embark on their first world tour. The tour began on August 6, 2022, in Seoul, South Korea, and included 20 shows across Asia and North America. The second show in Seoul was live-streamed and later restreamed via Beyond Live. Additional dates were added in Southeast Asia in October 2022.

Setlist in Seoul

Act 1

1. "In the Morning" (MAMA version)
2. "Sorry Not Sorry" (MAMA version)
3. "Shoot!"
4. "What I Want"
5. "365"
6. "Boss Bitch" (Ryujin cover)
7. "Cherry"
8. "Icy"
9. "Free Fall"
10. "#Twenty"
11. "Maniac" (Yuna cover)
12. "Red" (Lia cover)

Act 2

13. "Wannabe"
14. "Dalla Dalla"
15. "Sneakers"

Act 3

16. "Bloodline" (Chaeryeong cover)
17. "Hotter than Hell" (Yeji cover)

Act 4

18. "Want It?"
19. "Nobody Like You"
20. "Loco" (shortened)
21. "Not Shy" (Extended live version)

Encore

22. "Domino"
23. "Trust Me (Midzy)" (English version)
24. "It'z Summer"
25. "Be in Love"
Setlist in North America

Act 1

1. "In the Morning" (MAMA version)
2. "Sorry Not Sorry" (MAMA version)
3. "Shoot!"
4. "What I Want"
5. "365"
6. "Boss Bitch" (Ryujin cover)
7. "Cherry"
8. "Icy"
9. "Free Fall"
10. "#Twenty"
11. "Maniac" (Yuna cover)
12. "Red" (Lia cover)

Act 2

13. "Wannabe"
14. "Dalla Dalla"
15. "Sneakers"

Act 3

16. "Bloodline" (Chaeryeong cover)
17. "Hotter than Hell" (Yeji cover)

Act 4

1. "Boys Like You"
2. "Nobody Like You"
3. "Loco" (shortened)
4. "Not Shy" (Extended live version)

Encore

1. "Domino"
2. "Trust Me (Midzy)" (English version)
3. "It'z Summer"
4. "Be in Love"
Setlist in Asia (Excluding Japan)

Act 1

1. "In the Morning" (MAMA version)
2. "Sorry Not Sorry" (MAMA version)
3. "Shoot!"
4. "What I Want"
5. "365"
6. "Boss Bitch" (Ryujin cover)
7. "Cherry"
8. "Icy"
9. "Free Fall"
10. "#Twenty"
11. "Maniac" (Yuna cover)
12. "Red" (Lia cover)

Act 2

1. "Wannabe"
2. "Dalla Dalla"
3. "Sneakers"

Act 3

1. "Bloodline" (Chaeryeong cover)
2. "Hotter than Hell" (Yeji cover)

Act 4

1. "Cheshire"
2. "Loco" (shortened)
3. "Not Shy" (Extended live version)

Encore

1. "Domino"
2. "Trust Me (Midzy)" (Taipei and Hong Kong - Chinese version)
3. "Boys Like You"
4. "Nobody Like You"
Setlist in Japan

Act 1

1. "In the Morning" (MAMA version)
2. "Sorry Not Sorry" (MAMA version)
3. "Shoot!"
4. "Voltage"
5. "Boss Bitch" (Ryujin cover)
6. "Blah Blah Blah"
7. "Icy"
8. "Free Fall"
9. "#Twenty"
10. "Maniac" (Yuna cover)
11. "Red" (Lia cover)

Act 2

12. "Wannabe"
13. "Dalla Dalla"
14. "Sneakers"

Act 3

1. "Bloodline" (Chaeryeong cover)
2. "Hotter than Hell" (Yeji cover)

Act 4

1. "Cheshire"
2. "Loco" (shortened)
3. "Not Shy" (Extended live version)

Encore

20. "Domino"
21. "Trust Me (Midzy)" (Japanese version)
22. "It'z Summer"
23. "Boys Like You"
24. "Nobody Like You"

==== Tour dates ====
Date	City	Country	Venue	Attendance
August 6, 2022	Seoul	South Korea	SK Olympic Handball Gymnasium; Beyond Live (Note: August 7 only.)	10,000
August 7, 2022	Seoul	South Korea	SK Olympic Handball Gymnasium; Beyond Live	10,000
October 26, 2022	Los Angeles	United States	YouTube Theater	—
October 29, 2022	Phoenix	United States	Arizona Federal Theatre	—
November 1, 2022	Dallas	United States	Toyota Music Factory	—
November 3, 2022	Houston	United States	Smart Financial Centre	—
November 5, 2022	Atlanta	United States	Fox Theatre	—
November 7, 2022	Chicago	United States	Rosemont Theatre	—
November 10, 2022	Boston	United States	MGM Music Hall	—
November 13, 2022	New York City	United States	Hulu Theater	—
January 14, 2023	Pasay	Philippines	SM Mall of Asia Arena	—
January 15, 2023	Pasay	Philippines	SM Mall of Asia Arena	—
January 28, 2023	Singapore		The Star Performing Arts Centre	—
February 4, 2023	Jakarta	Indonesia	Tennis Indoor Senayan	—
February 22, 2023	Chiba	Japan	Makuhari Event Hall; Beyond Live (Note: February 23 only.)	—
February 23, 2023	Chiba	Japan	Makuhari Event Hall; Beyond Live	—
February 26, 2023	Taoyuan	Taiwan	NTSU Arena	8,000
March 11, 2023	Hong Kong	China	AsiaWorld–Expo	—
March 12, 2023	Hong Kong	China	AsiaWorld–Expo	—
April 8, 2023	Bangkok	Thailand	Thunder Dome	—
Total				N/A

Born to Be World Tour
- World tour by Itzy
- Promotional poster for Seoul show
- Associated album: Born to Be
- Start date: February 24, 2024
- End date: August 10, 2024
- Legs: 3
- No. of shows: 11 in Asia; 11 in North America; 5 in Europe; 2 in Latin America; 3 in Oceania; 32 in total

Itzy concert chronology
- Checkmate World Tour (2022-2023); Born to Be World Tour (2024); Tunnel Vision World Tour (2026)

=== Born to Be World Tour ===
The Born to Be World Tour was the second worldwide concert tour by South Korean girl group Itzy, held in support of their eighth EP, Born to Be (2024).

On December 3, 2023, JYP Entertainment announced that Itzy would return with new music the following month, accompanied by their second world tour. The tour schedule was revealed on January 26, 2024, and a second show was later added in Toronto for June 29, 2024.

The tour began on February 24, 2024, in Seoul, South Korea, and included 30 shows across Asia, Oceania, the Americas, and Europe. Due to Lia's hiatus, the tour was promoted with four members, although she appeared in the audience at the second Seoul concert.

Setlist in Seoul / US / EMEA / Asia Only

Act 1

1. "Born to Be" (Extended intro)
2. "Racer"
3. "Kidding Me"
4. "Mr. Vampire"
5. "Swipe"
6. "Wannabe" (Extended dance break intro)

Act 2

7. "Mine" (Chaeryeong solo)
8. "Run Away" (Ryujin solo)
9. "Yet, But" (Yuna solo)
10. "Crown on My Head" (Yeji solo, extended outro)

Act 3

11. "Untouchable" (Extended intro)
12. "Gas Me Up"
13. "Dynamite"
14. "Psychic Lover"
15. "Don't Give a What"
16. "Loco" (Dancers extended outro)

Act 4

17. "Not Shy" (Extended band intro)
18. "Cake"
19. "Sneakers" (Chanting outro)
20. "Kill Shot"
21. "Escalator" (Extended outro)

Encore

22. "Love Is"
23. "Be in Love"
24. "Chillin' Chillin'"
25. "Dalla Dalla" (Extended outro)
Setlist in Japan Only

Act 1

1. "Born to Be" (Extended intro)
2. "Racer"
3. "Kidding Me"
4. "Mr. Vampire"
5. "Swipe"
6. "Wannabe" (Extended dance break intro)

Act 2

7. "Mine" (Chaeryeong solo)
8. "Run Away" (Ryujin solo)
9. "Yet, But" (Yuna solo)
10. "Crown on My Head" (Yeji solo, extended outro)

Act 3

11. "Untouchable" (Extended intro)
12. "Ringo"
13. "Algorhythm"
14. "Psychic Lover"
15. "Don't Give a What"
16. "Loco" (Dancers extended outro)

Act 4

17. "Not Shy" (Extended band intro)
18. "Cake"
19. "Sneakers" (Chanting outro)
20. "Kill Shot"
21. "Escalator" (Extended outro)

Encore

22. "Sugar‐holic"
23. "Spice"
24. "No Biggie"
25. "Dalla Dalla" (Extended outro)
Setlist in Manila and Hong Kong

Act 1

1. "Born to Be" (Extended intro)
2. "Racer"
3. "Kidding Me"
4. "Mr. Vampire"
5. "Swipe"
6. "Wannabe" (Extended dance break intro)

Act 2

7. "Mine" (Chaeryeong solo)
8. "Run Away" (Ryujin solo)
9. "Yet, But" (Yuna solo)
10. "Crown on My Head" (Yeji solo, extended outro)

Act 3

11. "Untouchable" (Extended intro)
12. "Gas Me Up"
13. "Dynamite"
14. "Psychic Lover"
15. "Don't Give a What"
16. "Loco" (Dancers extended outro)

Act 4

17. "Not Shy" (Extended band intro)
18. "Cake"
19. "Sneakers" (Chanting outro)
20. "Kill Shot"
21. "Escalator" (Extended outro)

Encore

22. "Love Is"
23. "Be in Love"
24. "Boys Like You"
25. "Dalla Dalla" (Extended outro)

==== Tour dates ====
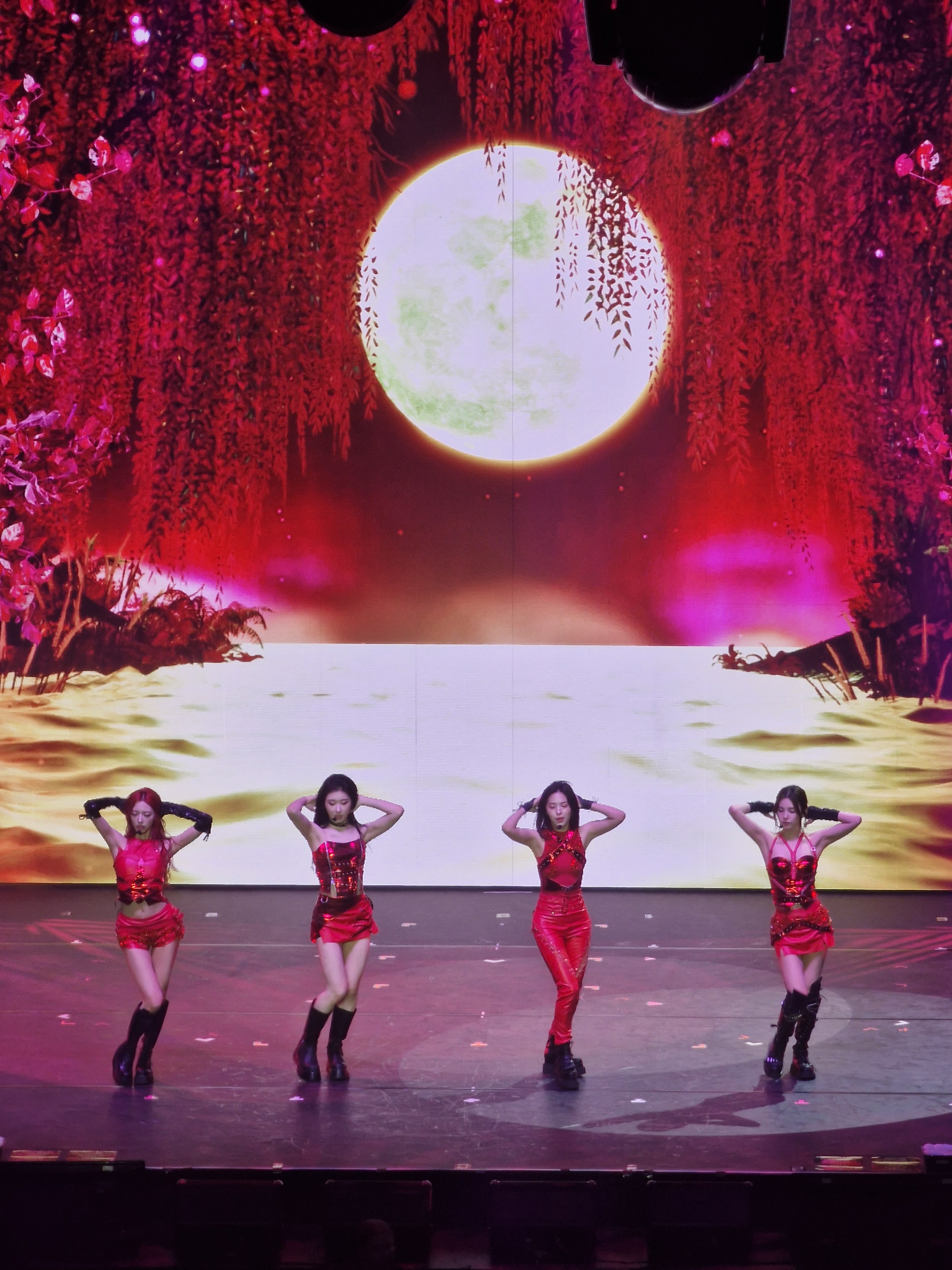
Itzy in Amsterdam, Netherlands

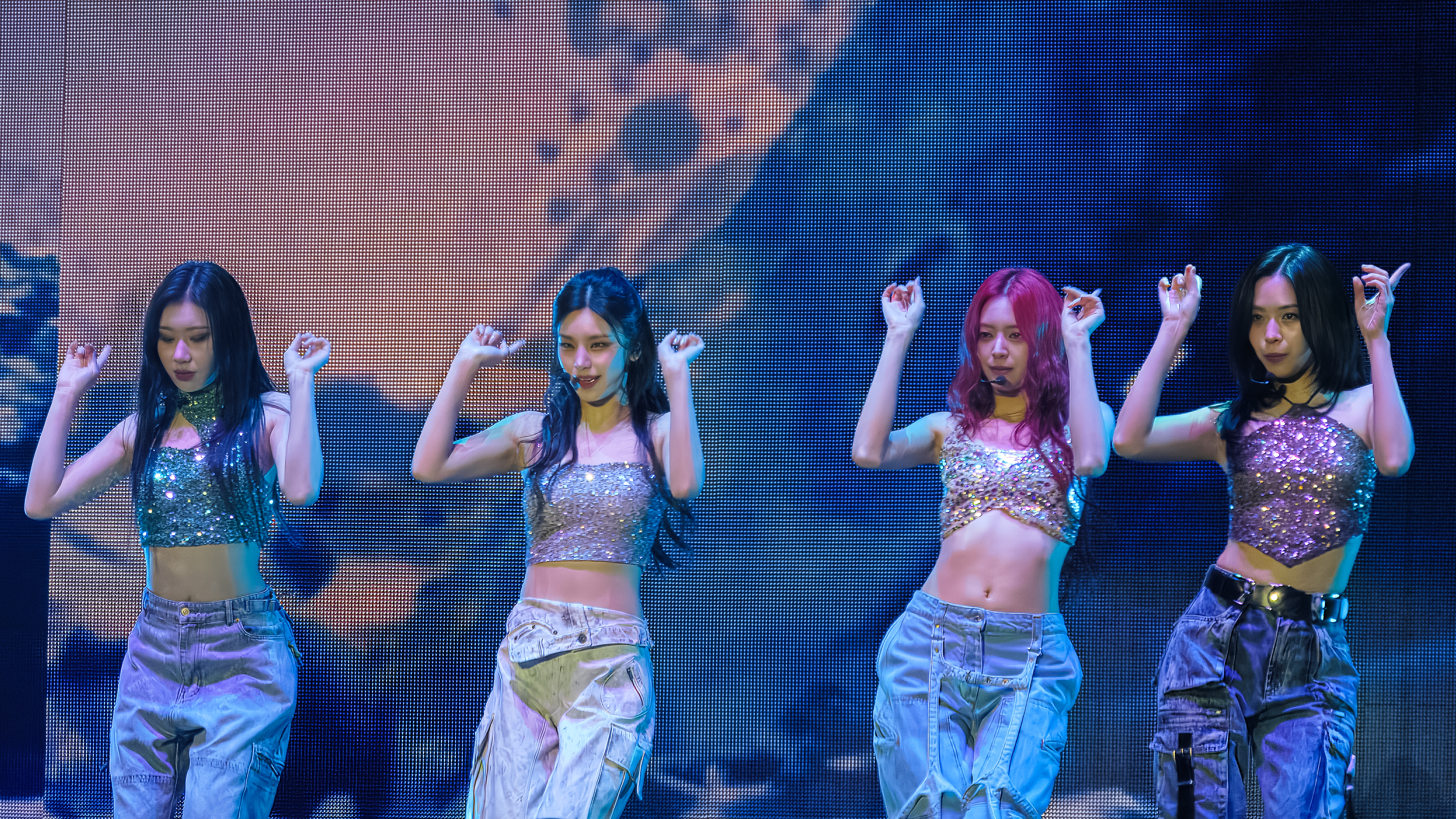
Itzy in Seattle, United States

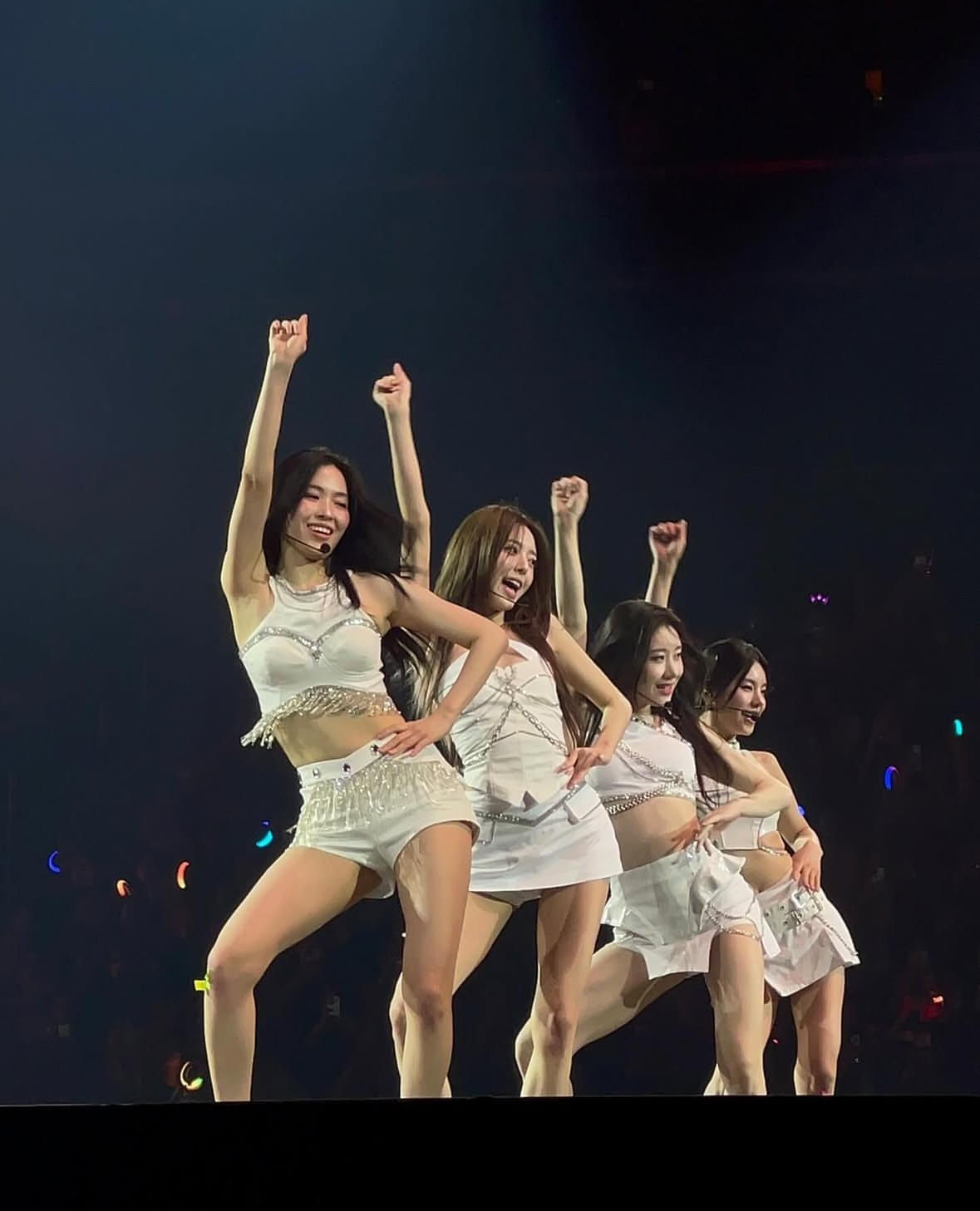
Itzy in Manila, Philippines

Date	City	Country	Venue	Attendance
February 24, 2024	Seoul	South Korea	Jamsil Arena	—
February 25, 2024	Seoul	South Korea	Jamsil Arena	—
March 16, 2024	Bangkok	Thailand	Impact Arena	—
March 21, 2024	Auckland	New Zealand	Spark Arena	—
March 24, 2024	Sydney	Australia	International Convention Centre	—
March 26, 2024	Melbourne	Australia	Margaret Court Arena	—
April 6, 2024	Singapore		Singapore Indoor Stadium	7,500
April 15, 2024	Mexico City	Mexico	Pepsi Center	—
April 18, 2024	Santiago	Chile	Movistar Arena	—
April 24, 2024	London	United Kingdom	Wembley Arena	—
April 26, 2024	Paris	France	Zénith Paris	—
April 28, 2024	Berlin	Germany	Velodrom	—
May 1, 2024	Amsterdam	Netherlands	AFAS Live	—
May 4, 2024	Madrid	Spain	Palacio Vistalegre	—
May 17, 2024	Tokyo	Japan	Yoyogi National Gymnasium	45,000
May 18, 2024	Tokyo	Japan	Yoyogi National Gymnasium	45,000
May 19, 2024	Tokyo	Japan	Yoyogi National Gymnasium	45,000
May 22, 2024	Osaka	Japan	Osaka-jō Hall	45,000
June 6, 2024	Seattle	United States	WAMU Theater	—
June 8, 2024	Oakland	United States	Oakland Arena	—
June 11, 2024	Inglewood	United States	Kia Forum	—
June 14, 2024	Sugar Land	United States	Smart Financial Centre	—
June 16, 2024	Irving	United States	Toyota Music Factory	—
June 18, 2024	Atlanta	United States	Fox Theatre	—
June 20, 2024	Fairfax	United States	EagleBank Arena	—
June 23, 2024	Newark	United States	Prudential Center	—
June 26, 2024	Chicago	United States	Rosemont Theatre	—
June 28, 2024	Toronto	Canada	Great Canadian Casino Resort	—
June 29, 2024	Toronto	Canada	Great Canadian Casino Resort	—
July 20, 2024	Taipei	Taiwan	Taipei Arena	—
August 3, 2024	Manila	Philippines	SM Mall of Asia Arena	—
August 10, 2024	Hong Kong	China	AsiaWorld–Arena	—
Total				—

=== Tunnel Vision World Tour ===
Tunnel Vision World Tour
- World tour by Itzy
- Promotional poster for Seoul show
- Location: Asia; Oceania; Europe
- Associated albums: Tunnel Vision; Motto
- Start date: February 13, 2026
- End date: October 3, 2026
- Legs: 2
- No. of shows: 13 in Asia; 2 in Oceania; 4 in Europe; 19 in total

Itzy concert chronology
- Born to Be World Tour (2024); Tunnel Vision World Tour (2026)

The Tunnel Vision World Tour was the third worldwide concert tour by South Korean girl group Itzy, held in support of their eleventh EP, Tunnel Vision (2025). The tour also featured the debut of solo songs that were later released on the group's twelfth EP, Motto, in 2026.

On October 28, 2025, JYP Entertainment announced that Itzy would embark on their third world tour. The tour began with three nights at Jamsil Indoor Stadium in Seoul, South Korea, from February 13 to 15, 2026. One show, in Auckland, New Zealand, was cancelled. The tour concluded in Singapore on October 3, 2026.

Setlist in Seoul and Australia Only

Act 1

1. "TUNNEL VISION"
2. "DYT"
3. "Girls Will Be Girls"

MENT

4. "Walk"
5. "Kiss & Tell"
6. "WANNABE"

Act 2

7. "Supernatural"
8. "Nocturne"
9. "Imaginary Friend"

Act 3

10. "Asylum" (Lia solo – unreleased)
11. "Tangerine" (Yuna solo – unreleased)
12. "Pocket" (Yeji solo – unreleased)
13. "Undefined" (Chaeryeong solo – unreleased)
14. "LOOK" (Ryujin solo – unreleased)

Act 4

15. "GOLD"
16. "Wild Wild West"
17. "In The Morning"
18. "THAT'S A NO NO" (Half)

MENT

19. "Sorry Not Sorry"
20. "Not Shy"
21. "LOCO"

Encore

22. "Mirror"
23. "FIVE"

MENT

24. "8-BIT HEART"
25. "SNEAKERS" (Half)
26. "CAKE" (Half)
27. "Dalla Dalla" (Half)

Double Encore

28. "That's a No No" (Half - Seoul Day 3 Only)
Setlist in Tokyo Only

Act 1

1. "TUNNEL VISION"
2. "DYT"
3. "Girls Will Be Girls"

MENT

4. "Walk"
5. "Kiss & Tell"
6. "WANNABE"

Act 2

7. "Supernatural"
8. "Nocturne"
9. "Imaginary Friend"

Act 3

10. "Asylum" (Lia solo)
11. "Tangerine" (Yuna solo)
12. "Pocket" (Yeji solo)
13. "Undefined" (Chaeryeong solo)
14. "LOOK" (Ryujin solo)

Act 4

15. "GOLD"
16. "Wild Wild West"
17. "In the Morning"
18. "THAT'S A NO NO"

MENT

19. "ROCK & ROLL"
20. "Not Shy"
21. "LOCO"

Encore

22. "Trigger"
23. "FIVE"

MENT

24. "8-BIT HEART"
25. "Voltage"
26. "Blah Blah Blah"
27. "RINGO"
28. "Algorhythm"
Note: Yeji performed in a "limited capacity" due to a back injury.
Setlist in Hong Kong through Singapore

Act 1

1. "TUNNEL VISION"
2. "DYT"
3. "Girls Will Be Girls"

MENT

4. "Walk"
5. "Kiss & Tell"
6. "WANNABE"

Act 2

7. "Supernatural"
8. "Imaginary Friend"
9. "Motto"

Act 3

10. "Asylum" (Lia solo)
11. "Tangerine" (Yuna solo)
12. "Pocket" (Yeji solo)
13. "Undefined" (Chaeryeong solo)
14. "LOOK" (Ryujin solo)

Act 4

15. "GOLD"
16. "Wild Wild West"
17. "In The Morning"
18. "THAT'S A NO NO" (Half)

MENT

19. "Sorry Not Sorry"
20. "Not Shy"
21. "LOCO"

Encore

22. "Mirror"
23. "FIVE"

MENT

24. "8-BIT HEART"
25. "SNEAKERS" (Half)
26. "CAKE" (Half)
27. "Dalla Dalla" (Half)

Double Encore
Hong Kong and Manila

28. "THAT'S A NO NO"

Kaohsiung Day 2

28. "Boys Like You"

Macao, Taipei and Singapore

28. "Psychic Lover"

==== Tour dates ====
Date	City	Country	Venue	Attendance
February 13, 2026	Seoul	South Korea	Jamsil Arena	—
February 14, 2026	Seoul	South Korea	Jamsil Arena	—
February 15, 2026	Seoul	South Korea	Jamsil Arena	—
April 17, 2026	Melbourne	Australia	John Cain Arena	—
April 19, 2026	Sydney	Australia	International Convention Centre	—
May 9, 2026	Tokyo	Japan	Keio Arena Tokyo	—
May 10, 2026	Tokyo	Japan	Keio Arena Tokyo	—
June 20, 2026	Hong Kong		AsiaWorld–Arena	—
June 27, 2026	Kaohsiung	Taiwan	Kaohsiung Arena	24,000
June 28, 2026	Kaohsiung	Taiwan	Kaohsiung Arena	24,000
July 4, 2026	Bangkok	Thailand	Impact Arena	—
July 11, 2026	Manila	Philippines	SM Mall of Asia Arena	—
August 15, 2026	Macau	China	Venetian Arena	—
September 5, 2026	Taipei	Taiwan	Taipei Arena	10,000
September 11, 2026	London	United Kingdom	Wembley Arena	—
September 13, 2026	Amsterdam	Netherlands	AFAS Live	—
September 15, 2026	Paris	France	Zénith Paris	—
September 17, 2026	Frankfurt	Germany	Festhalle Frankfurt	—
October 3, 2026	Singapore		Singapore Indoor Stadium	—
Total				—

List of cancelled shows
Date	City	Country	Venue	Reason
April 22, 2026	Auckland	New Zealand	Spark Arena	Cancelled due to unforeseen circumstances.

== Showcases ==
=== Itzy 'It'z Different' Debut Showcase ===
Itzy launched promotions for It'z Different with a live broadcast event titled "The 1st Single Live Premiere" on V Live, during which they performed "Dalla Dalla" for the first time.

=== Itzy Premiere Showcase Tour 'Itzy? Itzy!' ===
Showcase concert dates
Date	City	Country	Venue
Asia
November 2, 2019	Jakarta	Indonesia	Plenary Hall JCC
November 9, 2019	Macau	China	Broadway Theatre
December 1, 2019	Taipei	Taiwan	Taipei International Convention Center
December 8, 2019	Manila	Philippines	New Frontier Theater
December 13, 2019	Singapore		Suntec Convention & Exhibition Centre
December 21, 2019	Bangkok	Thailand	Union Hall
North America
January 17, 2020	Los Angeles	United States	The Novo by Microsoft
January 19, 2020	Minneapolis	United States	State Theatre
January 22, 2020	Houston	United States	Bayou Music Center
January 24, 2020	Washington D.C.	United States	Warner Theatre
January 26, 2020	New York City	United States	Kings Theatre
