= John Cheshire =

John Cheshire may refer to:

- John Cheshire (RAF officer) (born 1942), retired British Royal Air Force commander
- John Cheshire (boxer) (born 1947), British boxer
- John Cheshire (rugby league) (1933–2024), Welsh rugby league footballer
- John Cheshire (physician) (1695–1762), English physician
