= Cheshire (surname) =

Cheshire is a surname, derived from the English county of Cheshire. Notable people with the surname include:

- Drew Cheshire (born 1991), English rugby union player
- Edward Cheshire (c.1841–1919), British brewer and Mayor of Smethwick
- Elizabeth Cheshire (born 1967), American actress
- Fleming D. Cheshire (1849–1922), American businessman, interpreter, and diplomat
- Geoffrey Cheshire (1886–1978), British barrister, scholar, and writer
- Godfrey Cheshire (born 1951), American film critic, film writer, and director
- Harry Cheshire (1891–1968), American actor
- Ian Cheshire (engineer) (1936–2013), Scottish petroleum engineer
- Ian Cheshire (businessman) (born 1959), British businessman
- Jenny Cheshire, British sociolinguist and professor
- John Cheshire (RAF officer) (born 1942), British retired senior Royal Air Force commander
- John Cheshire (boxer) (born 1947), British boxer
- John Cheshire (rugby league) (1933–2024), Welsh rugby league footballer
- Joseph Blount Cheshire (1850–1932), American Episcopal bishop of North Carolina, US
- Leonard Cheshire (1917–1992), British World War II RAF pilot and philanthropist
- Lorraine Cheshire (1960–2025), English actress
- Maxine Cheshire (1930–2020), American newspaper reporter
- Oliver Cheshire (born 1988), English fashion model and writer
- Pip Cheshire (1950–2026), New Zealand architect
- Rowan Cheshire (born 1995), British freestyle skier
- Simon Cheshire (born 1964), British author of children's literature
- Stuart Cheshire, computer scientist and programmer at Apple
