= Ian Cheshire =

Ian Cheshire may refer to:

- Ian Cheshire (engineer) (1936–2013), British petroleum engineer
- Ian Cheshire (businessman) (born 1959), British businessman
