= Kill My Doubt =

- Digital cover

EP by Itzy
- Released: July 31, 2023
- Studio: JYPE Studio (Seoul)
- Genre: K-pop
- Length: 17:41
- Language: Korean
- Labels: JYP; Republic
- Producers: Aryay; Philip von Boch Scully; FLYT; Rado; Gingerbread; daysof1993; Gusten Dahlqvist; David Burris

Itzy chronology
Cheshire (2022)	Kill My Doubt (2023)	Ringo (2023)

Singles from Kill My Doubt
- 1. "Cake" Released: July 31, 2023

Kill My Doubt (stylized in all caps) is the seventh extended play (EP) by South Korean girl group Itzy, released on July 31, 2023, through JYP Entertainment, and Republic Records, eight months following the release of Cheshire (2022).

Inspired by the conversations shared by the members and their company following the release of Cheshire, Kill My Doubt lyrically revolves around the message of overcoming adversity and self-doubt. The EP comprises six tracks and is supported by the lead single "Cake". The release of the EP was preceded by music videos for album tracks "Bet on Me" and "None of My Business". Commercially, Kill My Doubt debuted at number one on South Korea's Circle Album Chart with 1,299,329 copies sold in the first week of release, becoming Itzy's sixth number-one album on the chart. In October 2023, the EP was certified Million by the Korea Music Content Association (KMCA) for surpassing 1,000,000 copies sold, the group's third million-seller album.

== Background ==
In 2022, Itzy released their fifth and sixth extended plays. Checkmate, their fifth EP, was released on July 15 and was accompanied by a world tour of the same name, which ran from August 2022 to April 2023. While on tour, Itzy released their sixth EP, Cheshire, on November 30.

While both releases were met with commercial success, "Sneakers", the lead single of Checkmate, was subject to criticism and contention, in contrast to positive reception received by the album's B-side tracks. Meanwhile, Cheshire was seen as a "mature update" to the quintet's sound, though the pre-release single "Boys Like You" was criticized by media outlets such as NME, for having "painfully juvenile" lyrics.

Following the release of Cheshire, the quintet began working on their next release. Such plans were first revealed by member Chaeryeong in an interview with the American morning program Good Day New York on May 22, 2023. On June 18, Sports Chosun reported that Itzy would release new music in the summer, which would mark their first release in over seven months. The following day, fans sent trucks bearing protest messages to the headquarters of JYP Entertainment demanding better treatment and promotion of the group. Soon thereafter, JYP Entertainment announced the group's seventh extended play, titled Kill My Doubt, through a teaser trailer. The trailer was followed by the release of the EP's track list and details of the promotion schedule. Amid the promotions for the EP, the protests continued.

== Music and lyrics ==
"It is a story about what to do when you are most anxious and how to overcome it when it is the most difficult. Kill My Doubt is an album made based on the conversations we had at that time."

— Lia, on her understanding of the EP on an interview with W Korea.

Kill My Doubt has runtime of 17 minutes and 41 seconds and consists of six tracks. Thematically, the album revolves around the message of overcoming adversity. In an interview with W Korea, member Lia explained that the EP was derived on conversations from the one-on-one interviews between the members and the company's production team during the post-production phase of Cheshire. Member Yuna added that the EP intends to "deliver the message that we should overcome and regain our confidence".

A variety of songwriters were involved in the writing of the extended play, including Black Eyed Pilseung, who had previously worked with Twice, and Park Jin-young.

=== Songs ===
The opening track, "Bet on Me", is a pop song inspired by Park's conversations with the members. The song departs from the quintet's characteristic powerful style and delves into a vulnerable approach, exploring themes of anxiety, confidence, and empowerment. "Cake", the second track, serves as the EP's lead single, and is characterized by the use of energetic brass and drum sounds, expressing the members' confidence. The third track, "None of My Business", is a pop song that expresses apathy towards a former lover characterized a mellow, rhythmic sound.

== Release and promotion ==
=== Marketing ===
SK Olympic Handball Gymnasium (pictured in 2008 before remodeling) will be the venue of Itzy's showcase for the EP.

An "album spoiler" video with audio snippets of the EP's songs and their corresponding choreographies was released online on July 16. Featuring only Yeji and Ryujin, the video prompted online debate regarding the absence of the remaining three members. The music for the lead single, "Cake", was promoted through teaser trailers released on July 26 and 28.

The EP was released on July 31, in conjunction with the music video for the "Cake". The quintet held a showcase at the SK Olympic Handball Gymnasium in support of Kill My Doubt on the day of the EP's release. A pop-up store at the Hyundai Seoul was opened in support of the EP from July 27 to August 9, where visitors were given pre-access to the EP's six tracks.

The production of the EP was chronicled in three "album documentaries" released on YouTube; the first was released on July 19.

=== Music videos ===
In addition to the lead single, "Cake", B-side tracks "Bet on Me" and "None of My Business" also received music videos, serving as pre-releases. In a media interview, member Ryujin explained that "Bet on Me" received a music video as the song "best interprets the meaning of the album", while "None of My Business" received a music video as the song's characteristic rhythmic sound was suited for a summer release.

The music video was for "Bet on Me" was released online on July 3, with concept art preceding its release, while the music video for "None of My Business" followed on July 24. The video for "Bet on Me" aimed to capture the feeling of being alone, depicting the members in everyday settings, wearing clothing contrasting with their usual bold outfits. It ends with the members running through a dark tunnel, towards a bright light. In the summer-themed video for "None of My Business", the members perform choreography created by Lachica. The final music video, for the lead single "Cake", was released alongside the EP on July 31.

=== Concept art ===
Multiple trailers and concept art were released to promote the EP. The EP's first teaser trailer saw the members pose confidently in streetwear on multiple sets to an ominous instrumental. In concept art released on July 11, Itzy was in a space with a "mysterious purple light" and punching bags, showcasing outfits with a "flashy sporty look". More concept art followed the next day, in which the members were seen in hip-hop inspired outfits. Concept art released on July 13 depicted them in a locker room.

Cho Sung-woon of Sports Donga compared the concept photos for "Bet on Me" to a movie poster, describing them as having a "melancholic tone". The first teaser trailer for "Cake" showcased the members in matching red and white outfits with the text "cake", performing choreography on their hands. In the second teaser trailer, the members were outdoors, where they spilled glitter and balloons from a truck.

== Accolades ==
Awards and nominations for Kill My Doubt
Year	Organization	Award	Result	Ref.
2024	Golden Disc Awards	Best Album (Bonsang)	Nominated	

== Commercial performance ==
On August 1, the Hanteo Chart reported that the album sold over 318,000 units on the day of its release.

== Track listing ==
Kill My Doubt track listing
No.	Title	Lyrics	Music	Arrangement	Length
1.	"Bet on Me"	J.Y. Park "The Asiansoul"; 12h51m (VeryGoods)	David (Mickey) Karbal; Philip von Boch Scully; Ben Samama; Eli Teplin; Lauren Dyson; Kendall Grayson Brower	Karbal; von Boch Scully	3:19
2.	"Cake"	B.E.P; Jeon Goon	B.E.P; FLYT	Rado; FLYT	3:18
3.	"None of My Business"	Lee Seu-ran; Rachel West; Barry Cohen	West; Cohen	Gingerbread	3:22
4.	"Bratty" (나쁜애)	Ellie Suh (153/Joombas); Lilijune (153/Joombas); Adrienne Ben Haim (Note: Also known as Hadar Adora.); Larus Arnarson; Michael Ojike McHenry	Ben Haim; Arnarson; McHenry	DaysOf1993	2:42
5.	"Psychic Lover"	Danke (Lalala Studio)	Christian Fast; Gusten Dahlqvist; Sofia Quinn; Noémie Legrand	Dahlqvist	2:44
6.	"Kill Shot"	Kang Eun-jeong	Quinn; David James Burris; Legrand	Burris	2:16
Total length:					17:41

== Credits and personnel ==
Personnel

- Itzy – vocals (all tracks)
- J.Y. Park “The Asiansoul" – lyrics, vocal direction, digital editing (track 1)
- 12h51m (VeryGoods) – lyrics (track 1)
- David (Mickey) Karbal – composition (track 1)
- Philip von Boch Scully – composition, arrangement, copyright control programming sessions (track 1)
- Ben Samana – composition (track 1)
- Eli Tepin – composition, keyboard (track 1)
- Lauren Dyson – composition (track 1)
- Kendall Bryson Brower – composition (track 1)
- Aryay (Ascap) – arrangement, original publishing, copyright control programming sessions (track 1)
- Perrie – vocal direction, (track 1, 3–5), background vocals (track 1, 3–6)
- Lee Sang-yeop – digital editing, recording (track 1)
- Koo Hye-jin – recording (track 1–2)
- Tony Maserati – mixing (track 1)
- David K. Younghyun – mixing (track 1)
- Kwon Nam-woo – mastering (track 1)
- B.E.P. – lyrics, composition (track 2)
- FLYT – composition, arrangement, sessions guitar, bass, digital editing (track 2)
- Rado (B.E.P.) – arrangement, string, vocal direction, background vocals, digital editing (track 2)
- Ashley Alisha – background vocals (track 2)
- Eom Sae-hee – recording (track 2)
- Kim Min-hee – recording (track 2)
- Curtis Douglas – mixing (track 2)
- Chris Gehringer – mastering (track 2)
- Lee Seu-ran – lyrics (track 3)
- Rachel West – lyrics, composition (track 3)
- Barry Cohen – lyrics, composition (track 3)
- Gingerbread – arrangement, copyright control sessions, programming, guitar, drums, synthesizer, drums, data analysis (track 3)
- Lim Hong-jin – digital editing (track 3–4)
- Lim Chan-mi – digital editing (track 3–4, 6), recording (track 6)
- Lee Tae-seop – mixing (track 3, 5–6)
- Kwon Nam-moo – mastering (track 3–6)
- Ellie Suh (153/Joombas) – lyrics (track 4)
- Liljune (153/Joombas) – lyrics (track 4)
- Adrienne Ben Haim – lyrics, composition (track 4)
- Larus Arnarson – lyrics, composition (track 4)
- Michael Ojike McHenry – lyrics, composition (track 4)
- Daysof1993 – arrangement (track 4)
- Camo – vocal direction (track 4)
- Lee Sang-yeop – digital editing (track 4)
- Danke (La La La Studio) – lyrics, composition (track 5)
- Christian Fast – composition (track 5)
- Gusten Dahlqvist – composition (track 5)
- Sofia Quinn – composition (track 5–6)
- Noémie Legrand – composition (track 5–6)
- Gusten Dahlqvist – arrangement, copyright control sessions, computer programming, keyboard (track 5)
- Yue – digital editing (track 5)
- Seo Eun-il – recording (track 5)
- Kang Eun-jang – lyrics (track 6)
- David Burris – composition, arrangement, copyright control sessions, computer programming, keyboard (track 6)
- Young Chance – vocal direction (track 6)

Locations

- JYP Publishing (KOMCA) – original publishing, sub-publishing (track 1)
- VeryGoods – original publishing (track 1)
- BellaBella Publishing (BMI) – original publishing (track 1)
- Spirit Two Music – original publishing (track 1)
- BeachBreak Publishing (BMI) – original publishing (track 1)
- THG Publishing / Sony Music (BMI) – original publishing (track 1)
- EKKO Music Rights (powered by CTGA) – sub-publishing (track 1), original publishing (track 6)
- Kobalt/EKKO – sub-publishing (track 1)
- JYPE Studio – digital editing, recording (all tracks), mixing (track 3, 6)
- Chapel Swing Studios – mixing (track 1)
- 821 Sound Mastering – mastering (track 1, 3–6)
- Universal Music Publishing – original publishing (track 2)
- Music Cube Inc. – original publishing (track 2)
- 821 Sound – recording (track 2)
- Sterling Sound – mixing (track 2)
- Call Me Lisa – original publishing (track 3)
- Songs For Jude & Elle – original publishing (track 3)
- There Are Songs of Pulse (ASCAP) – original publishing (track 3)
- That Ginger Dude (BMI) – original publishing (track 3)
- 153/Joombas Publishing – original publishing, sub-publisher (track 4)
- House of Borealis Publishing/Big Chune Music/Where Da Kasz At (BMI) – original publishing (track 4)
- Beats N Ballads/Honua Music (ASCAP) – original publishing (track 4)
- Ekko (kobalt admin) – original publishing (track 4)
- Emits Son Songs (BMI) – original publishing (track 4)
- Lalala Studio – original publishing (track 5)
- Fast Cut Music Publishing – original publishing (track 5)
- Cosmos Music Publishing – original publishing (track 5)
- Seven Summits Music / Sofia Since 96 Publishing – original publishing (track 5–6)
- Seven Peaks Music / Bébé Dior – original publishing (track 5–6)
- Iconic Sounds – sub-publishing (track 5)
- Admin by Sony Music Publishing Worldwide – sub-publishing (track 5)
- Music Cube – sub-publishing (track 5)
- UMPG – sub-publishing (track 5–6)

== Charts ==
=== Weekly charts ===
Weekly chart performance
Chart (2023)	Peak position
Belgian Albums (Ultratop Flanders)	110
Belgian Albums (Ultratop Wallonia)	100
Croatian International Albums (HDU)	9
French Albums (SNEP)	148
German Albums (Offizielle Top 100)	38
Greek Albums (IFPI)	7
Hungarian Albums (MAHASZ)	35
Japanese Albums (Oricon)	22
Japanese Combined Albums (Oricon)	22
Japanese Hot Albums (Billboard Japan)	29
Polish Albums (ZPAV)	14
South Korean Albums (Circle)	1
Swedish Physical Albums (Sverigetopplistan)	13
Swiss Albums (Schweizer Hitparade)	89
UK Album Downloads (Official Charts)	58
US Billboard 200	23
US World Albums (Billboard)	2

=== Monthly charts ===
Monthly chart performance
Chart (2023)	Position
Japanese Albums (Oricon)	26
South Korean Albums (Circle)	6

=== Year-end charts ===
Year-end chart performance
Chart (2023)	Position
South Korean Albums (Circle)	26

== Certifications ==
Certifications
Region	Certification	Certified units/sales
South Korea (KMCA)	Million	1,000,000^{^}
^{^} Shipments figures based on certification alone.

== Release history ==
Release dates and formats
Region	Date	Format	Version	Label	Ref.
Various	July 31, 2023	CD; digital download; streaming	A; B; C; D; Limited; Special (Bet on Me)	JYP; Republic	
Various	July 31, 2023	CD	Digipack	JYP; Republic	
Various	July 31, 2023	Cassette		JYP; Republic	
