= Cheshire Cat (disambiguation) =

The Cheshire Cat is a fictional character from Lewis Carroll's Alice's Adventures in Wonderland and derived works.

Cheshire Cat may also refer to:

== Music ==
- Cheshire Cat (Blink-182 album), 1995
- Cheshire Cat (Ronnie Foster album), 1975
- Cheshire Cat, an MC featured on Leftfield's album Rhythm and Stealth

== Other uses ==
- Cheshire Cat (DC Comics), a DC Comics character
- Cheshire Cat (Marvel Comics), a Marvel Comics character
- Cheshire Cat idiom or opaque pointer, a computer programming technique
- Cheshire Cat Eating House, a cafe in the Widows' Almshouses, Nantwich, Cheshire, England
- Quantum Cheshire cat, a phenomenon in quantum physics

== See also ==
- Cheshire (disambiguation)
