= Crazy in Love (Itzy album) =

- Digital cover

Studio album by Itzy
- Released: September 24, 2021
- Genre: K-pop
- Length: 51:09
- Languages: Korean; English
- Label: JYP

Itzy chronology
What'z Itzy (2021)	Crazy in Love (2021)	It'z Itzy (2021)

Singles from Crazy in Love
- 1. "Loco" Released: September 24, 2021

Crazy in Love is the first studio album by South Korean girl group Itzy, released on September 24, 2021, by JYP Entertainment. The album contains sixteen tracks, including the lead single "Loco".

It achieved commercial success, debuting at number one on South Korea's Gaon Album Chart and at number 11 on the US Billboard 200, marking Itzy's highest-charting album in the United States. In February 2022, the album was certified 2× platinum by the Korea Music Content Association for selling over 500,000 copies.

== Background and release ==
On August 13, 2021, JYP Entertainment announced that Itzy would release their first studio album, Crazy in Love, on September 24. The promotional schedule was revealed on August 31. An opening trailer was released on September 6, followed by a group teaser photo for the lead single "Loco" on September 7. The album's track listing was unveiled on September 10, and a highlight medley teaser video was released on September 20. On September 21, the music video teaser for album track "Swipe" was released, followed by the teaser for "Loco" on September 22.

== Composition ==
Crazy in Love consists of sixteen tracks. The lead single, "Loco", is described as a song that "expresses the strong attraction first felt, in the style of Generation Z". "Swipe" conveys a warning to someone who crosses the line, featuring "808 drum beats, heavy bass, and melodic rap flowing over a retro clarinet". "Sooo Lucky" is a pop track characterized by a "funky guitar" and "cool bass", with lyrics about the miracle of finding love among billions. "#Twenty" is a hip hop song that captures "the excitement and flutter of just turning 20". "Gas Me Up" reflects the anxiety felt before going on stage while emphasizing self-confidence. "Love Is" is a modern pop song delivering an "impressive message" about how "love grows more complicated and difficult as emotions deepen". "Chillin' Chillin'" depicts "the excitement of going on a trip away from ordinary daily life". The album concludes with "Mirror", a track that "maximizes its charm" with emotional vocals and a warm message: "I am already good enough as I am".

== Critical reception ==
Professional ratings
Review scores
Source	Rating
AllMusic	3.5/5 stars
IZM	2.5/5 stars
NME	3/5 stars
The Straits Times	4/5 stars

Tanu I. Raj of NME gave Crazy in Love a three-star review, noting that while the album is "conceptually and logically sound in ushering in an era of maturity" for the group, it lacks the empowering message that initially drew fans to Itzy. In contrast, Benson Ang of The Straits Times awarded the album four stars, praising its "catchy" and "high-energy" tracks and highlighting that it "makes for a great soundtrack for a girls' night out".

== Accolades ==
Awards and nominations for Crazy in Love
Year	Organization	Award	Result	Ref.
2021	Asian Pop Music Awards	Top 20 Albums of the Year (Overseas)	Won	
2021	Asian Pop Music Awards	Best Album of the Year (Overseas)	Nominated	
2022	Golden Disc Awards	Best Album (Bonsang)	Nominated	
2022	Seoul Music Awards	Bonsang Award	Nominated	

== Commercial performance ==
In South Korea, Crazy in Love debuted at number two on the Gaon Album Chart in the chart issue dated September 19–25, 2021. The album debuted at number four on the Gaon Monthly album chart with 335,610 copies sold, becoming Itzy's highest-selling album. By the end of 2021, the album surpassed 500,124 copies sold. In November 2021, Crazy in Love was certified Platinum by the Korea Music Content Association for selling over 250,000 copies. In February 2022, it was certified 2× Platinum for selling over 500,000 copies. Crazy in Love peaked at number one on the Gaon Album Chart in the chart issue dated January 30-February 5, 2022.

In the United States, the album debuted at number 11 on the Billboard 200 and at number one on the Top Album Sales chart with 22,000 sales, of which CD sales comprised 21,000 and 1,000 were via digital download. This was the group's second and highest-charting entry on the Billboard 200 after Guess Who earlier in the year and marked their first leader on the Top Album Sales chart. The album debuted at number one on Billboard's World Albums and Independent Albums charts in the same week as well.

In Japan, the album debuted at position 8 on the Oricon Albums Chart in the chart issue dated October 11, 2021. The album also debuted at position 34 on Billboard Japan Hot Albums in the chart issue dated September 29, 2021.

== Promotion ==
Prior to the album's release, on September 24, 2021, Itzy held a live event called "ITZY #OUTNOW COMEBACK SHOW" on Naver Now to introduce the album and connect with their fans.

== Track listing ==
Track listing for Crazy in Love
No.	Title	Lyrics	Music	Arrangement	Length
1.	"Loco"	Star Wars (Galactika)	Star Wars (Galactika); Atenna (Galactika); Woo Bin (Galactika)	Team Galactika	3:11
2.	"Swipe"	Jo Yoon-kyung	Ludvig Lindell; Josefin Glenmark; Oneye	Ludvig Lindell	2:57
3.	"Sooo Lucky"	Shim Eun-ji	Shim Eun-ji; Lee Min-young (EastWest); Yeul (1by1)	Lee Min-young (EastWest); Yeul (1by1); Shim Eun-ji	3:22
4.	"#Twenty"	Baek Geum-min (JamFactory); Earattack	Earattack; Charles "Chizzy" Stephens; Chan's; Eniac; Patricia K; Kim Bo-mi; April Bender	Earattack; Charles "Chizzy" Stephens; Chan's	2:54
5.	"B[oo]m-Boxx"	Jo In-ho (lalala studio)	Ian Asher; Anne Judith Stokke Wik; Nermin Harambašić; Ronny Svendsen	Ian Asher	3:13
6.	"Gas Me Up"	Vacation	250; Ylva Dimberg	250	2:29
7.	"Love Is"	Choi Ji-yoon (153/Joombas)	Harold Philippon; Kim Yeon-seo; Anne Judith Stokke Wik; Ronny Svendsen	Alawn	3:27
8.	"Chillin' Chillin'"	Yoon Ye-ji	Young Chance; Shorelle; David Anthony Eames	Bangkok	3:26
9.	"Mirror"	Jo Yoon-kyung	Sebastian Thott; Rosanna Enér	Sebastian Thott	4:18
10.	"Loco" (English version)	Star Wars (Galactika); Sophia Pae	Star Wars (Galactika); Atenna (Galactika); Woo Bin (Galactika)	Team Galactika	3:11
11.	"Dalla Dalla" (달라달라; instrumental)		Star Wars (Galactika); Atenna (Galactika)	Team Galactika	3:19
12.	"Icy" (instrumental)		J.Y. Park "The Asiansoul"; Cazzi Opeia; Ellen Berg Tollbom; Daniel Caesar; Ludwig Lindell; Ashley Alisha; Cameron Neilson; Lauren Dyson	J.Y. Park "The Asiansoul"; Lee Hae-seul	3:11
13.	"Wannabe" (instrumental)		Star Wars (Galactika); Woo Bin (Galactika)	Team Galactika	3:11
14.	"Not Shy" (instrumental)		Kobee; Charlotte Wilson	Kobee; Earattack; J.Y. Park "The Asiansoul"	2:57
15.	"In the Morning" (마.피.아. In the morning; instrumental)		Lyre; J.Y. Park "The Asiansoul"; Earattack; Kass; Lee Hae-sol	Lyre; J.Y. Park "The Asiansoul"; Lee Hae-sol; Earattack	2:52
16.	"Loco" (instrumental)		Star Wars (Galactika); Atenna (Galactika); Woo Bin (Galactika)	Team Galactika	3:11
Total length:					51:09

iTunes bonus track
No.	Title	Lyrics	Length
17.	"Thanks To." (Voice Track for Midzy)	Yeji; Lia; Ryujin; Chaeryeong; Yuna	17:22
Total length:			68:31

== Credits and personnel ==
Credits adapted from Melon.

Studio

- JYPE Studios – recording, digital editing, mixing (track 1–10)
- GALACTIKA Studios – recording, digital editing (track 1 and 10)
- Vibe Music Studio 606 – digital editing (track 5)
- Canton House Studios – mixing (track 1 and 10)
- GLAB Studios – mixing (track 3)
- JoeLab – mixing (track 8)
- Sterling Sound – mastering (track 1 and 10)
- 821 Sound Mastering – mastering (track 2–9)

Personnel

- Itzy – vocals, background vocals
- Star Wars (Galactika) – lyrics, composition, recording (track 1 and 10)
- Jo Yoon-kyung – lyrics (track 2 and 9)
- Shim Eun-ji – lyrics, composition, arrangement, vocal directing (track 3)
- Baek Geum-min (JamFactory) – lyrics (track 4)
- Jo In-ho (lalala studio) – lyrics (track 5)
- Vacation – lyrics (track 6)
- Choi Ji-yoon (153/Joombas) – lyrics (track 7)
- Yoon Ye-ji – lyrics (track 8)
- Earattack – lyrics, composition, arrangement, instruments (track 4)
- Sophia Pae – lyrics (track 10), background vocals (track 1, 5, and 9–10), vocal directing (track 5 and 9–10)
- Athena (Galactika) – composition, synthesizer, keyboard, bass, digital editing (track 1 and 10)
- Woo Bin (Galactika) – composition, synthesizer, keyboard, bass (track 1 and 10)
- Ludwig Lindell – composition, arrangement, programming (track 2)
- Josefin Glenmark – composition, background vocals (track 2)
- Oneye – composition (track 2)
- Lee Min-young (EastWest) – composition, arrangement, vocal directing, programming, bass, drum (track 3)
- Yeul (1by1) – composition, arrangement, programming, piano, bass, drum (track 3)
- Charles "Chizzy" Stephens – composition, arrangement, instruments (track 4)
- Chan's – composition, arrangement, instruments (track 4)
- Eniac – composition (track 4)
- Patricia K – composition (track 4)
- Kim Bo-mi – composition (track 4)
- April Bender – composition (track 4)
- Team Galactika – arrangement (track 1 and 10)
- Ian Asher – composition, arrangement, programming, instruments (track 5)
- Anne Judith Stokke Wik – composition (track 5 and 7)
- Nermin Harambašić – composition (track 5)
- Ronny Svendsen – composition (track 5 and 7)
- 250 – composition, arrangement, vocal directing, programming, instruments (track 6)
- Ylva Dimberg – composition (track 6)
- Harold Philippon – composition (track 7)
- Kim Yeon-seo – composition, background vocals, vocal directing (track 7)
- Young Chance – composition, vocal directing, digital editing (track 8)
- Shorelle – composition, vocal directing (track 8)
- David Anthony Eames – composition (track 8)
- Sebastian Thott – composition, arrangement, programming, instruments (track 9)
- Rosanna Enér – composition (track 9)
- Alawn – arrangement, programming, mixing, bass, synthesizer, drums (track 7)
- Bangkok – arrangement, programming, instruments (track 8)
- Ra.L – background vocals (track 2 and 4)
- Friday (Galactika) – background vocals, vocal directing (track 1 and 10)
- e.NA (Galactika) – background vocals (track 1 and 10)
- OGI (Galactika) – background vocals (track 1 and 10)
- Aiden – background vocals (track 1 and 10)
- Yi Da-eun – background vocals (track 3)
- Sound Kim – background vocals (track 8)
- Earattack – recording, vocal directing (track 2 and 4)
- Um Se-hee – recording, digital editing, (track 1–3, 5, and 10)
- Park Eun-jung – recording (track 1, 8, and 10)
- Yi Sang-yeop – recording (track 2 and 6)
- Gu Hye-jin – recording (track 3–5, 7–9)
- Choi Hye-jin – recording (track 7)
- Jeong Yu-ra – digital editing (track 2 and 4)
- Jiyoung Shin NYC – digital editing (track 3)
- Jeong Mo-yeon – digital editing (track 5 and 9)
- Yue – digital editing (track 6–7)
- Kang Sun-young – digital editing (track 8)
- Jaycen Joshua – mixing (track 1 and 10)
- Jacob Richards – mixing (assistant) (track 1 and 10)
- Mike Seaberg – mixing (assistant) (track 1 and 10)
- DJ Riggins – mixing (assistant) (track 1 and 10)
- Im Hong-jin – mixing (track 2 and 9)
- Shin Bong-won – mixing (track 3)
- Lee Tae-seop – mixing (track 4)
- Park Eun-jung – mixing (track 5)
- MasterKey – mixing (track 6)
- Uncle Jo – mixing (track 8)
- Kang Dong-ho – mixing (assistant) (track 8)
- Chris Gehringer – mastering (track 1 and 10)
- Kwon Nam Woo – mastering (track 2–9)
- Chang (Galactika) – drums, synthesizer, keyboard, bass (track 1 and 10)
- Park Cella Kim – guitar (track 1 and 10)
- Jeong Su-wan – guitar (track 3)

== Charts ==
=== Weekly charts ===
Weekly chart performance
Chart (2021–22)	Peak position
Belgian Albums (Ultratop Flanders)	26
Belgian Albums (Ultratop Wallonia)	41
Finnish Albums (Suomen virallinen lista)	21
Hungarian Albums (MAHASZ)	13
Japan Hot Albums (Billboard Japan)	34
Japanese Albums (Oricon)	8
South Korean Albums (Gaon)	1
UK Album Downloads (Official Charts)	39
US Billboard 200	11
US Independent Albums (Billboard)	1
US World Albums (Billboard)	1

=== Monthly charts ===
Monthly chart performance
Chart (2021)	Peak position
South Korean Albums (Gaon)	4

=== Year-end charts ===
Year-end chart performance
Chart (2021)	Position
South Korean Albums (Gaon)	27

== Certifications ==
Certifications
Region	Certification	Certified units/sales
South Korea (KMCA)	2× Platinum	608,345
United States	—	22,000

== Release history ==
Release dates and formats
Region	Date	Format	Label
Various	September 24, 2021	CD; digital download; streaming	JYP
