= John Cheshire (physician) =

English physician

- Born: 1695
- Died: 1762 (aged 66–67)
- Occupation: Physician

John Cheshire (1695–1762) was an English physician.

== Biography ==
Cheshire is stated to have been educated at Oxford, although he does not seem to have graduated from there. He practised medicine in Leicester and the surrounding district, but never entered the London College of Physicians. He attained local celebrity and wrote two medical books: ‘A Treatise upon the Rheumatism,’ first published at Leicester in 1723, and afterwards in an enlarged edition, London, 1735; and ‘The Gouty Man's Companion,’ Nottingham, 1747. A case related (p. 14, ed. 1728; p. 26, ed. 1735) shows that Cheshire did not clearly distinguish between gout and chronic rheumatism. Of acute rheumatism his account shows little clinical knowledge, and is mixed up with trivial passages from other authors and much self-praise. For chronic rheumatism he recommends the waters of Kedlestone (p. 148), and for acute rheumatism advises cold baths and sweating between blankets (p. 75). ‘The Gouty Man's Companion’ is more interesting, but contains no important observations. Cheshire advises temperance as a preventive, draws up a diet scale, recommends tea in the afternoon, calomel and emetics during the attack, mercury in the intervals. He had observed that sciatic pain was sometimes a part of a general gouty condition, and this is almost the only weighty remark in all his pages. Of his personal history and character his medical writings give some glimpses. They show that he himself suffered from gout, that he had a high opinion of his own merits, and that he had been patronised by William, the third lord Craven. Craven was one of the followers of Pulteney, and in a servile dedication Cheshire goes out of his way to join in the cry against Robert Walpole as a corrupt and wicked minister, who ought to be impeached ‘in order to satisfy the well-grounded resentment of an injured nation.’
