= 12th Circle Chart Music Awards =

2023 South Korean award ceremony

- Official poster
- Date: February 18, 2023
- Location: KSPO Dome, Seoul
- Country: South Korea
- Presented by: Korea Music Content Association and SPOTV
- Hosted by: Doyoung; Miyeon
- Most awards: BTS (5)
- Most nominations: BTS; Blackpink; Ive (6)
- Website: circlechartmusicawards.com

Television/radio coverage
- Network: STATV; SPOTV2

The 12th Circle Chart Music Awards (Korean: 써클차트 뮤직 어워즈 2022) was an award ceremony organized by Circle Chart, held at KSPO Dome in Seoul on February 18, 2023. It recognized the best artists and recordings, primarily based on Circle Music Chart of the year from December 1, 2021, to November 30, 2022. The ceremony was hosted by Doyoung and Miyeon.

It was broadcast live on STATV and SPOTV2 in South Korea. It was also available to watch live on online platform Idolplus.

On December 7, 2022, it was announced that the Gaon Chart Music Awards rebranded as Circle Chart Music Awards.

== Winners and nominees ==
Winners and nominees are listed in alphabetical order. Winners are listed first and emphasized in bold.

=== Main awards ===
Artist of the Year – Global Digital Music
December 2021	January 2022
**Ive – "Eleven"**; Aespa – "Dreams Come True"; Be'O – "Counting Stars" (featuring Beenzino); BTS – "Butter (Holiday Remix)"; IU – "Winter Sleep"	**Kep1er – "Wa Da Da"**; Enhypen – "Polaroid Love"; Got the Beat – "Step Back"; Choi Ye-na – "Smiley" (featuring (Bibi); Taeyeon – "Can't Control Myself"
February 2022	March 2022
**Taeyeon – "INVU"**; Nmixx – "O.O"; STAYC – "Run2U"; Treasure – "Jikjin"; Treasure – "Darari"	**(G)I-dle – "Tomboy"**; NCT Dream – "Glitch Mode"; Stray Kids – "Maniac"; Red Velvet – "Feel My Rhythm"; Jay Park – "Ganadara" (featuring IU)
April 2022	May 2022
**Ive – "Love Dive"**; Big Bang – "Still Life"; Seventeen – "Darl+ing"; Psy – "That That" (featuring Suga); Jessi – "Zoom"	**Le Sserafim – "Fearless"**; NCT Dream – "Beatbox"; Seventeen – "Hot"; Tomorrow X Together – "Opening Sequence"; Tomorrow X Together – "Good Boy Gone Bad"
June 2022	July 2022
**BTS – "Yet to Come (The Most Beautiful Moment)"**; Nayeon – "Pop!"; BTS – "Run BTS"; BTS – "For Youth"; BTS – "Born Singer"	**Aespa – "Girls"**; Itzy – "Sneakers"; J-Hope – "More"; J-Hope – "Arson"; Seventeen – "_World"
August 2022	September 2022
**Blackpink – "Pink Venom"**; Ive – "After Like"; NewJeans – "Attention"; NewJeans – "Hype Boy"; Twice – "Talk That Talk"	**Blackpink – "Shut Down"**; Blackpink – "Typa Girl"; Blackpink – "Hard to Love"; Blackpink – "The Happiest Girl"; Crush – "Rush Hour" (featuring J-Hope)
October 2022	November 2022
**Le Sserafim – "Antifragile"**; (G)I-dle – "Nxde"; Stray Kids – "Case 143"; Seulgi – "28 Reasons"; Jin – "The Astronaut"	**Itzy – "Cheshire"**; Red Velvet – "Birthday"; Red Velvet – "Bye Bye"; Bibi – "Bibi Vengeance"; Kara – "When I Move"
Artist of the Year – Physical Album
1st Quarter (December 2021 – February 2022)	2nd Quarter (March – May 2022)
**NCT – Universe**; Enhypen – Dimension: Answer; Nmixx – Ad Mare; SM Town – 2021 Winter SM Town: SMCU Express; Treasure – The Second Step: Chapter One	**Seventeen – Face the Sun**; NCT Dream – Glitch Mode; NCT Dream – Beatbox; Stray Kids – Oddinary; Tomorrow X Together – Minisode 2: Thursday's Child
3rd Quarter (June – August 2022)	4th Quarter (September – November 2022)
**BTS – Proof**; Aespa – Girls; Enhypen – Manifesto: Day 1; Ive – After Like; Seventeen – Sector 17	**Stray Kids – Maxident**; Blackpink – Born Pink; Itzy – Cheshire; NCT 127 – 2 Baddies; Jin – The Astronaut
New Artist of the Year
Digital Music	Physical Album
**NewJeans – "Attention"**; Ive – "Eleven"; Kep1er – "Wa Da Da"; Le Sserafim – "Fearless"; Nmixx – "O.O"	**Ive – After Like**; Kep1er – Doublast; Le Sserafim – Antifragile; NewJeans – New Jeans; Nmixx – Entwurf

=== Other awards ===
Other Categories	Winner
Record Production of the Year	(G)I-dle (Cube Entertainment) – I Never Die
Discovery of the Year – Hiphop	Be'O
Discovery of the Year – Rock & Metal	Younha
Composer of the Year	Ryan S. Jhun
Lyricist of the Year	Seo Ji-eum
Performer of the Year – Musical Instrument	Choi In-sung
Performer of the Year – Chorus	Sophia Pae
Style of the Year – Performance Director	Kim Eun-ju & Kim Young-hoo
Style of the Year – Visual Director	Park Min-hee
Female Solo Artist of the Year	Nayeon
Male Solo Artist of the Year	Lim Young-woong
Female Group of the Year	Blackpink
Male Group of the Year	Seventeen
New Icon of the Year	Nmixx
New Icon of the Year	Choi Ye-na
Hot Performance of the Year	Enhypen
Song of the Year in International Pop	The Kid Laroi and Justin Bieber – "Stay"
International Rising Star of the Year	Gayle
Music Steady Seller of the Year	Lim Young-woong – "Love Always Runs Away"
World K-Pop Star	Tomorrow X Together
World K-Pop Rookie	STAYC
Retail Album of the Year	BTS – Proof
Best Kit Album of the Year	NCT
Social Hot Star of the Year	BTS
Mubeat Global Choice – Female	Blackpink
Mubeat Global Choice – Male	Lim Young-woong
Idolplus Global Artist	BTS
Idolplus New Star	Tempest

== Performers ==
Order of the performance, name of the artist(s), and song(s) they performed
Order	Artist(s)	Song performed
1	WeDemBoyz	Dance performance (Note: Kendrick Lamar's "N95", Tobe Nwigawe & Fat Nwigawe's "Get a Lil Bag", and Treasure's "VolKno")
2	Nmixx	"O.O" + "Dice"
3	Kep1er	"Wa Da Da" + "We Fresh"
4	Pengsoo and Jung Ji-so	"This is Pengsoo"
5	Tempest	"Dragon" + "Bad News"
6	Choi Ye-na	"Love War" + "Smiley"
7	Be'O	"Counting Stars" + "Without You" + "Flick"
8	Enhypen	"One in a Billion" + "Future Perfect (Pass the Mic)" + "Fever"
9	Just B	2022 All the K-POP (Dance medley) (Note: BTS' "Yet to Come (The Most Beautiful Moment)", Ive's "Eleven", NCT U's "Universe (Let's Play Ball)", Taeyeon's "INVU", Le Sserafim's "Fearless", (G)I-dle's "Tomboy", Blackpink's "Pink Venom", Ive's "Love Dive", Stray Kids' "Case 143", Itzy's "Cheshire", Seventeen's "Hot", Le Sserafim's "Antifragile", and Blackpink's "Shut Down")
10	STAYC	"Beautiful Monster" + "Run2u" + "Teddy Bear"
11	Tomorrow X Together	"Good Boy Gone Bad" + "Sugar Rush Ride"
12	Aespa	"Illusion" + "Girls"
13	BSS	"Fighting" + "Just Do It"

== Presenters ==
Order of the presentation, name of the artist(s), and award(s) they presented
Order	Artist(s)	Presented
1	Moon Sang-min and Oh Ye-ju	New Icon of the Year
2	Lee Jin-ho and Hwang Jae-song	Artist of the Year – Digital Music (December, January, February)
3	Shin Seung-ho and Kim Da-som	Artist of the Year – Digital Music (March, April, May)
4	Pengsoo and Jung Ji-so	World K-Pop Star and Best Kit Album of the Year
5	Kim Ho-young	Idolplus Global Artist and Idolplus New Star
6	Sunghoon	Performer of the Year – Musical Instrument, Chorus
7	Vata and Ingyoo (WeDemBoyz)	Discovery of the Year – Hiphop, Rock & Metal
8	Lee Yi-kyung and Lee Mi-joo	Hot Performance of the Year
8	Lee Hye-ri and Kim Young-dae	World K-POP Star, Female and Male Group of the Year
9	Yoon Il-sang	Composer of the Year and Lyricist of the Year
10	Seo Hyun-woo and Cha Joo-young	Artist of the Year – Digital Music (June, July, August)
11	Park Sung-hoon and Park Ji-hyun	Artist of the Year – Physical Album (1st and 2nd Quarter)
12	Lee Je-hoon	Record Production of the Year
