= Cheshire Bridge =

Cheshire Bridge may refer to:

- Cheshire Bridge (Connecticut River), connecting New Hampshire and Vermont, U.S.
- Cheshire Bridge, an historic bridge in the Atlanta area of Georgia, U.S.
  - Cheshire Bridge Road, in Atlanta, named after the bridge
