= Boys Like You (Itzy song) =

Single by Itzy

from the EP Cheshire
- Language: English
- Released: October 21, 2022
- Studio: JYPE (Seoul); The Hub (Seoul)
- Genre: Pop
- Length: 3:43
- Label: JYP; Republic
- Composer(s): Didrik Thott; Sebastian Thott; Hayley Aitken
- Lyricist(s): Didrik Thott; Hayley Aitken; Sara Davis; Ellie Suh (153/Joombas); Juhee Lee (MUMW)

Itzy singles chronology
"Blah Blah Blah" (2022)	"Boys Like You" (2022)	"Cheshire" (2022)

Music video
- "Boys Like You" on YouTube

"Boys Like You" is a song recorded by the South Korean girl group Itzy. It was released by JYP Entertainment and Republic Records on October 21, 2022. The song is the group's first English single and serves as a pre-release for the group's sixth EP Cheshire. "Boys Like You" is a pop song with punk elements composed by Didrik Thott, Sebastian Thott, Hayley Aitken and written by Didrik Thott, Hayley Aitken, Sara Davis, Ellie Suh (153/Joombas) and Juhee Lee (MUMW).

== Background and release ==
On October 17, JYP Entertainment announced that Itzy would release an English single titled "Boys Like You", which would serve as a pre-release song for the group's upcoming album. The first teaser for the music video was released the following day.

A concept poster of the members was released on October 19, while a second teaser for the music video was released the next day. The song along with its music video were released on October 21.

== Composition ==
The song was composed by Didrik Thott, Sebastian Thott, and Hayley Aitken, while the lyrics was written by Didrik Thott, Hayley Aitken, Sara Davis, Ellie Suh, and Lee Joo Hee. Arrangement was handled by Sebastian Thott. It is a pop song that incorporates punk elements, "catchy" rhythmic rap, and ad-libs. The lyrics showcase the group realizing their worth and refusing to "take back a two-timing boyfriend."

== Credits and personnel ==
Credits adopted from Melon.

Studio

- JYP Studios — digital editing, recording
- The Hub Studio A — recording
- Chapel Swing Studios — mixing
- Sterling Sound — mastering

Personnel

- Itzy — vocals
- Didrik Thott — lyricist, composition
- Hayley Aitken — lyricist, composition
- Sara Davis — lyricist
- Ellie Suh (153/Joombas) — lyricist
- Juhee Lee (MUMW) — lyricist
- Sebastian Thott — composition, arrangement, keyboard, sessions computer programming
- Frankie Day (The Hub) — background vocals, vocal director
- Brian U — vocal director, recording
- Friday (Galactica) — vocal director
- Lee Sang-yeop — digital editing, recording
- Lim Chan-mi — digital editing
- Um Se-hee — recording
- Ku Hye-jin — recording
- Tony Maserati — mixing
- David K — mixing
- Younghyun — mixing
- Valley Glen — mixing
- Chris Gehringer — mastering

== Charts ==
Chart performance for "Boys Like You"
Chart (2022)	Peak position
South Korea BGM (Circle)	125
South Korea Download (Circle)	42

== Release history ==
Release history for "Boys Like You"
Region	Date	Format	Label	Ref.
Various	October 21, 2022	Digital download; streaming	JYP; Republic	
