= John Cheshire (rugby league) =

Wales international rugby league player (1933–2024)

Personal information
- Full name: John Harry Cheshire
- Born: 9 February 1933 Wattsville, Wales
- Died: 4 September 2024 (aged 91)

Playing information
- Position: Centre
Club
Years	Team	Pld	T	G	FG	P
1955–62	Salford	255	43	141		411
1962–64	Oldham RLFC	10	0	0	0	0
	Total	265	43	141	0	411
Representative
Years	Team	Pld	T	G	FG	P
1959	Wales	1	1			3

John Harry Cheshire (9 February 1933 – 4 September 2024) was a Welsh professional rugby league footballer who played in the 1950s and 1960s. He played at representative level for Wales, and at club level for Salford and Oldham RLFC, as a centre.

== Background ==
Cheshire was born in Wattsville, in the Newport district of Wales on 9 February 1933. He died on 4 September 2024, at the age of 91.

== International honours ==
Cheshire won a cap for Wales while at Salford in 1959.
