= Cheshire (song) =

Single by Itzy

from the EP Cheshire
- Language: Korean
- Released: November 30, 2022
- Studio: JYPE Studio; Sterling Sound; Studio Nomad
- Genre: Dance-pop
- Length: 3:02
- Label: JYP; Republic
- Composers: Timothy Tan; Ciara Muscat; Josefin Glenmark; Jar (153/Joombas); Justin Reinstein; JJean
- Lyricists: Hwang Su-min (153/Joombas); Jeong Ha-ri (153/Joombas)

Itzy singles chronology
"Boys Like You" (2022)	"Cheshire" (2022)	"Cake" (2023)

Music video
- Cheshire on YouTube

Professional ratings
Review scores
Source	Rating
IZM	2.5/5 stars

"Cheshire" is a song recorded by South Korean girl group Itzy for their sixth extended play of the same name. It was released as the EP's lead single by JYP Entertainment and Republic Records on November 30, 2022.

== Background and release ==
On November 7, 2022, JYP Entertainment announced Itzy would be releasing their sixth extended play titled Cheshire on November 30, with the promotional schedule released on the same day. On November 24, the track listing was released with "Cheshire" announced as the lead single. The following day, the track spoiler video was released. The music video teasers was released on November 28 and 29. The song was released alongside its music video and the EP on November 30.

== Composition ==
"Cheshire" was written by Hwang Su-min and Jeong Ha-ri of 153/Joombas, composed and arranged primarily by Timothy Tan and Justin Reinstein along with Ciara Muscat, Josefin Glenmark, Jar (153/Joombas), and JJean for the composition. It was described as a dance-pop song featuring "fresh piano riff and strong bass rhythm" with lyrics that conveys the message of "believing in your own feelings as there is no right answer to your worries and questions about yourself". "Cheshire" was composed in the key of G major, with a tempo of 99 beats per minute.

== Commercial performance ==
"Cheshire" debuted at number 105 on South Korea's Circle Digital Chart in the chart issue dated November 27 – December 3, 2022. It ascended to number 89 in the following week. In Singapore, the song debuted number 24 on the RIAS Top Streaming Chart, and number 12 on the RIAS Top Regional Chart in the chart issue dated December 2–8, 2022. In Taiwan, the song debuted at number 16 on the Billboard Taiwan Songs in the chart issue dated December 17, 2022. In Netherlands, the song debuted at number 31 on the Dutch Global 40 in the chart issue dated December 5, 2022.

== Promotion ==
Following the release of Cheshire, on November 30, 2022, the group performed "Cheshire" at 2022 MAMA Awards. They subsequently performed on three music programs in the first week: KBS's Music Bank on December 2, MBC's Show! Music Core on December 3, and SBS's Inkigayo on December 4. On the second and final week, they performed on Music Bank on December 9 where they won first place, Show! Music Core on December 10, and Inkigayo on December 11.

== Accolades ==
"Cheshire" received a first place music program award on the December 9, 2022, broadcast of Music Bank. At the 12th Circle Chart Music Awards, "Cheshire" won the Artist of the Year – Global Digital Music (November) award, beating Red Velvet's "Birthday" and Kara's "When I Move".

== Credits and personnel ==
Credits adapted from Melon.

Studio

- JYPE Studio – recording, mixing, digital editing
- Sterling Sound – mastering
- Studio Nomad – digital editing

Personnel

- Itzy – vocals
- Song Hee-jin (Solcire) – background vocals
- Hwang Su-min (153/Joombas) – lyrics
- Jeong Ha-ri (153/Joombas) – lyrics
- Timothy Tan – composition, arrangement, synth, bass, piano/keys, drum
- Justin Reinstein – composition, arrangement, synth
- Ciara Muscat – composition
- Josefin Glenmark – composition
- Jar (153/Joombas) – composition
- JJean – composition
- Goo Hye-jin – recording, digital editing
- Lee Tae-seop – mixing
- Chris Gehringer – mastering
- Kwon Nam-woo – mastering
- Choi – digital editing
- Mr Cho (Solcire) – digital editing
- Noday – vocal directing

== Charts ==
=== Weekly charts ===
Weekly chart performance
Chart (2022)	Peak position
Netherlands (Global 40)	31
Singapore (RIAS)	24
South Korea (Circle)	89
Taiwan (Billboard)	16

=== Monthly charts ===
Monthly chart performance
Chart (2022)	Peak position
South Korea (Circle)	102

== Release history ==
Release history
Region	Date	Format	Label
Various	November 30, 2022	Digital download; streaming	JYP; Republic

== See also ==
- List of Music Bank Chart winners (2022)
