= Cheshire (EP) =

- Digital cover

EP by Itzy
- Released: November 30, 2022
- Recorded: 2022
- Studio: JYPE Studios; The Hub Studio
- Length: 12:33
- Language: Korean
- Label: JYP; Republic
- Producer: Justin Reinstein; Timothy Tan; Joshua Leung; Stian Nyhammer Olsen; Jacob "Ontrackz" Andersson; Sebastian Thott

Itzy chronology
Checkmate (2022)	Cheshire (2022)	Kill My Doubt (2023)

Singles from Cheshire
- 1. "Boys Like You" Released: October 21, 2022; 2. "Cheshire" Released: November 30, 2022

Cheshire is the sixth extended play by South Korean girl group Itzy. It was released by JYP Entertainment and Republic Records on November 30, 2022, and contains four tracks, including the pre-release English-language single "Boys Like You", and the lead single of the same name.

Cheshire was a commercial success, where it debuted at number one on South Korea's Circle Album Chart with 779,525 copies sold in the first week of release, becoming Itzy's fifth number-one album on the chart. In January 2023, the EP was certified Million by the Korea Music Content Association (KMCA) for surpassing 1,000,000 copies sold, the group's second million-seller album.

== Background and release ==
On October 21, 2022, Itzy released the pre-release English-language single "Boys Like You" prior to the release of their upcoming album. On November 7, JYP Entertainment announced Itzy would be releasing their sixth extended play titled Cheshire on November 30, with the promotional schedule released on the same day. On November 9, the first concept film was released. On November 16, the second concept film was released. On November 24, the track listing was released with "Cheshire" announced as the lead single. The following day, the track spoiler video was released. The music video teasers for lead single "Cheshire" was released on November 28 and 29. The EP was released alongside the music video for "Cheshire" on November 30.

== Composition ==
The opening track "Cheshire," serves as the album's lead single. It was inspired by the "mischievous" Cheshire Cat from the 1951 Disney movie Alice in Wonderland. It was described as the opposite of the previous lead single "Sneakers". If the latter was more “energetic” and full of "peppy vibe and shouty delivery," then this one flirts with more darker, "subdued" instrumentals, "bold lyrics," groovy, and "sensuous" composition. It's characterized by a "funky" bassline and gritty electronic beats. Lyrically, it’s moved away from the "straightforward takes on love" in comparison to their past music; on "Cheshire," the group become "active players in the game of love, pushing and pulling the subject of their affections to fulfill their every whim and fancy. They almost veer into a femme-fatale approach to romance, though they are motivated by mischief (hence the Cheshire Cat inspiration) rather than more nefarious intentions." Followed by the second track, "Snowy," that samples Beethoven's classical piece "Für Elise". It combines with a keyboard instrumental that "emulates the sound of twinkling bells, all while instilling a dark, unsettling atmosphere." The third track, "Freaky," is a R&B-pop song that takes a more "laid-back" and minimalist approach with lyrics about "shake off a persistent ex-lover." The closing track "Boys Like You," is the group's first English-language song, released prior to the album. It is a pop song that incorporates punk elements, "catchy" rhythmic rap, and ad-libs. The lyrics showcase the group realizing their worth and refusing to "take back a two-timing boyfriend."

== Critical reception ==
Professional ratings
Review scores
Source	Rating
NME	3/5 stars

Gladys Yeo of NME praised Cheshire as "a mature update to Itzy's sound", giving the album a three-star review. In particular, she found the title track's "darker, more subdued instrumentation" appealing and saw its lyrics as a departure from the group's previous music, with a bolder approach to romance. However, Yeo criticized the pre-release single "Boys Like You" as unfitting on the album with "painfully juvenile" lyrics.

== Accolades ==
Awards and nominations for Cheshire
Year	Organization	Award	Result	Ref.
2023	Circle Chart Music Awards	Artist of the Year – Physical Album (4th Quarter)	Nominated	

== Track listing ==
Track listing for Cheshire
No.	Title	Lyrics	Music	Arrangement	Length
1.	"Cheshire"	Hwang Su-min (153/Joombas); Jeong Ha-ri (153/Joombas)	Timothy Tan; Ciara Muscat; Josefin Glenmark; Jar (153/Joombas); Justin Reinstein; JJean	Timothy Tan; Justin Reinstein	3:02
2.	"Snowy"	Jang Jeong-won (Jam Factory)	Stian Nyhammer Olsen; Julia Bognar Finnseter; Paulos Solbø; Joshua Leung	Stian Nyhammer Olsen; Joshua Leung	2:53
3.	"Freaky"	Moon Seol-ri	Jacob "Ontrackz" Andersson; Molly Rosenstrom	Jacob "Ontrackz" Andersson	2:55
4.	"Boys Like You"	Didrik Thott; Hayley Aitken; Sara Davis; Ellie Suh (153/Joombas); Lee Joo-hee (MUMW)	Didrik Thott; Sebastian Thott; Hayley Aitken	Sebastian Thott	3:43
Total length:					12:33

== Credits and personnel ==
Studio

- JYPE Studio – recording (all tracks), mixing (track 1–3), digital editing (all tracks)
- The Hub Studio A – recording (track 4)
- Chapel Swing Studios – mixing (track 4)
- Sterling Sound – mastering (track 1, 4)
- 821 Sound Mastering – mastering (track 2–3)
- Studio Nomad – digital editing (track 1)

Personnel

- Itzy – vocals (all tracks)
- Song Hee-jin (Solcire) – background vocals (track 1)
- E.so (Galactika) – background vocals (track 2)
- Jvde (Galactika) – background vocals, vocal directing (track 2)
- Sophia Pae – background vocals, vocal directing (track 3)
- Frankie Day (The Hub) – background vocals, vocal directing (track 4)
- Hwang Su-min (153/Joombas) – lyrics (track 1)
- Jeong Ha-ri (153/Joombas) – lyrics (track 1)
- Jang Jeong-won (Jam Factory) – lyrics (track 2)
- Moon Seol-ri – lyrics (track 3)
- Didrik Thott – lyrics, composition (track 4)
- Hayley Aitken – lyrics, composition (track 4)
- Sara Davis – lyrics (track 4)
- Ellie Suh (153/Joombas) – lyrics (track 4)
- Lee Joo-hee (MUMW) – lyrics (track 4)
- Timothy Tan – composition, arrangement, synth, bass, piano/keys, drum, producer (track 1)
- Justin Reinstein – composition, arrangement, synth, producer (track 1)
- Ciara Muscat – composition (track 1)
- Josefin Glenmark – composition (track 1)
- Jar (153/Joombas) – composition (track 1)
- JJean – composition (track 1)
- Stian Nyhammer Olsen – composition, arrangement, computer programming, keyboard, producer (track 2)
- Joshua Leung – composition, arrangement, computer programming, keyboard, producer (track 2)
- Julia Bognar Finnseter – composition (track 2)
- Paulos Solbø – composition (track 2)
- Jacob "Ontrackz" Andersson – composition, arrangement, computer programming, keyboard, producer (track 3)
- Molly Rosenstrom – composition (track 3)
- Sebastian Thott – composition, arrangement, computer programming, keyboard, producer (track 4)
- Goo Hye-jin – recording (all tracks), digital editing (track 1, 3)
- Im Chan-mi – recording (track 2), digital editing (track 4)
- Eom Sae-hee – recording (track 4), digital editing (track 2)
- Lee Sang-yeop – recording, digital editing (track 4)
- Brian U – recording, vocal directing (track 4)
- Lee Tae-seop – mixing (track 1)
- Im Hong-jin – mixing (track 2–3)
- Tony Maserati – mixing (track 4)
- David K. Younghyun – mixing (track 4)
- Chris Gehringer – mastering (track 1, 4)
- Kwon Nam-woo – mastering (track 2–3)
- Choi – digital editing (track 1)
- Mr Cho (Solcire) – digital editing (track 1)
- Noday – vocal directing (track 1)
- Friday (Galactika) – vocal directing (track 2, 4)

== Charts ==
=== Weekly charts ===
Weekly chart performance
Chart (2022–2023)	Peak position
Belgian Albums (Ultratop Flanders)	67
Croatian International Albums (HDU)	2
Hungarian Albums (MAHASZ)	11
Japanese Albums (Oricon)	10
Japanese Combined Albums (Oricon)	13
Japanese Hot Albums (Billboard Japan)	39
South Korean Albums (Circle)	1
US Billboard 200	25
US World Albums (Billboard)	2

=== Monthly charts ===
Monthly chart performance
Chart (2022)	Peak position
Japanese Albums (Oricon)	28
South Korean Albums (Circle)	1

=== Year-end charts ===
Year-end chart performance
Chart (2022)	Position
South Korean Albums (Circle)	20

== Certifications and sales ==
Certifications and sales
Region	Certification	Certified units/sales
South Korea (KMCA)	Million	1,008,630

== Release history ==
Release history
Region	Date	Format	Label
South Korea	November 30, 2022	CD	JYP; Republic
Various	November 30, 2022	Digital download; streaming	JYP; Republic
