= Ian Cheshire (engineer) =

British petroleum engineer (1936–2013)

Ian Muir Cheshire (12 April 1936 – 28 November 2013) was a British petroleum engineer who developed the ECLIPSE reservoir simulator.

== Life and career ==
Cheshire was born on 12 April 1936 in London, England. He served during the Korean War. Cheshire worked for Schlumberger where he was a Schlumberger Fellow from 1999 to 2003.

He was awarded the Anthony F. Lucas Gold Medal by the Society of Petroleum Engineers in 2001. He was also awarded the Queen's Award for Technology in 1985.

Muir died in Oxfordshire on 28 November 2013, at the age of 77.
