= Cake (Itzy song) =

Single by Itzy

from the EP Kill My Doubt
- Language: Korean
- Released: July 31, 2023
- Studio: JYPE Studio (Seoul); 821 Studio (Seoul); Sterling Sound
- Genre: Pop; hip hop
- Length: 3:19
- Label: JYP; Republic
- Composers: B.E.P; Flyt
- Lyricists: B.E.P; Jeon Goon
- Producers: Rado; Flyt

Itzy singles chronology
"Cheshire" (2022)	"Cake" (2023)	"Ringo" (2023)

Music video
- Cake on YouTube

"Cake" is a song recorded by South Korean girl group Itzy for their seventh extended play Kill My Doubt. It was released as the EP's lead single by JYP Entertainment and Republic Records on July 31, 2023.

== Background and release ==
On June 19, 2023, JYP Entertainment announced Itzy would be releasing their seventh extended play titled Kill My Doubt on July 31. The track listing was also released on the same day with "Cake" announced as the lead single. A day later, the promotional schedule was released. The music video teasers was released on July 26, and July 27. The song was released alongside the EP and its music video on July 31.

== Composition ==
"Cake" was written and composed by duo Black Eyed Pilseung, with Jeon Goon participating in the lyrics writing, Flyt participating in the composition and arrangement, and the duo's Rado participating in the arrangement. The track has been described as an "energetic" pop and hip hop song characterized by "energetic brass and drum sounds" with lyrics carrying the message of "easily forget[ting] all your problems, like a piece of cake". Member Yeji explained that the song "is a summer score filled with the girl group's energetic vibe". Yuna noted that "the core essence of the track is the summer-themed melody that's guaranteed to fight off the heatwave". "Cake" was composed in the key of G major, with a tempo of 103 beats per minute.

== Critical reception and awards ==
Professional ratings
Review scores
Source	Rating
IZM	2/5 stars

Writing for IZM, Park Soo-jin noted that "the group's message of self-love and confidence [from previous releases] continued into [the song]". Park opined that "the song's various textures create a somewhat tight gap" however noting that "the musical approach was boring".

=== Accolades ===
"Cake" won a music program award on the August 11, 2023, episode of Music Bank. It received nominations for Song of the Year (Overseas) at the 2023 Asian Pop Music Awards and Best Music – Fall at The Fact Music Awards.

== Commercial performance ==
"Cake" debuted at number 77 on South Korea's Circle Digital Chart in the chart issue dated July 30 to August 5, 2023. It ascended to number 27 in the chart issue dated August 20–26, 2023. In Singapore, the song debuted at number 19 on the RIAS Top Regional Chart in the chart issue dated August 4–10, 2023. In Taiwan, the song debuted at number 23 on the Billboard Taiwan Songs in the chart issue dated August 19, 2023. Globally, the song debuted at number 194 on the Billboard Global Excl. U.S in the chart issue dated September 2, 2023.

== Music video and promotion ==
The music video was released alongside the song by JYP Entertainment on July 31. In the visual, Itzy could be seen "creating trouble" with scenes switching from "walking into a movie set" to "causing minor accidents" before showing "the world [starting] to fall apart around them [however] the girl group continue to sing and dance happily". The visual took inspiration from several scenes in Korean media, including Squid Game.

Shortly following the release of Kill My Doubt, Itzy held a showcase at the SK Olympic Handball Gymnasium to introduce the EP and its songs, including "Cake", and to communicate with their fans. The group subsequently performed on four music programs in the first week of promotion: Mnet's M Countdown on August 3, KBS's Music Bank on August 4, MBC's Show! Music Core on August 5, and SBS's Inkigayo on August 6. On the second week of promotion: they performed on three music programs: M Countdown on August 10, Show! Music Core special broadcast of the 2023 Ulsan Summer Festival on August 12., and Inkigayo on August 13. On the third week of promotion, they performed on Music Bank on August 18. On the fourth week of promotion, they performed on four music programs: M Countdown on August 24, Music Bank on August 25, Show! Music Core on August 26, and Inkigayo on August 27. On the fifth week of promotion, they performed on four music programs: M Countdown on August 31, Music Bank on September 1, Show! Music Core on September 2, and Inkigayo on September 3.

== Credits and personnel ==
Credits adapted from EP's liner notes.

Studio

- JYPE Studio – recording
- 821 Sound – recording
- Sterling Sound – mastering

Personnel

- Itzy – vocals
- Rado – producer, background vocals, arrangement, digital editing, vocal directing, string
- Flyt – producer, composition, arrangement, digital editing, guitar, bass
- Ashley Alisha – background vocals
- B.E.P – lyrics, composition
- Jeon Goon – lyrics
- Uhm Sae-hee – recording
- Goo Hye-jin – recording
- Kim Min-hee – recording
- Curtis Douglas – mixing
- Chris Gehringer – mastering

== Charts ==
=== Weekly charts ===
Weekly chart performance
Chart (2023)	Peak position
Global Excl. US (Billboard)	194
Singapore Regional (RIAS)	19
South Korea (Circle)	22
Taiwan (Billboard)	23

=== Monthly charts ===
Monthly chart performance
Chart (2023)	Position
South Korea (Circle)	25

=== Year-end charts ===
Year-end chart performance
Chart (2023)	Position
South Korea (Circle)	175

== Release history ==
Release history
Region	Date	Format	Label
Various	July 31, 2023	Digital download; streaming	JYP; Republic
