= Loco (Itzy song) =

- Promotional poster

Single by Itzy

from the album Crazy in Love
- Language: Korean
- Released: September 24, 2021
- Genre: K-pop
- Length: 3:11
- Label: JYP
- Composers: Star Wars (Galactika); Atenna (Galactika); Woo Bin (Galactika)
- Lyricists: Star Wars (Galactika); Sophia Pae

Itzy singles chronology
"In the Morning" (2021)	"Loco" (2021)	"Voltage" (2022)

Music video
- "Loco" on YouTube "Loco (Japanese Ver.)" on YouTube

"Loco" is a song recorded by South Korean girl group Itzy for their first Korean studio album Crazy in Love. It was released as the lead single on September 24, 2021, by JYP Entertainment. An English version was also included in the album. The lyrics were written by Star Wars (Galactika), and the music was composed by Star Wars (Galactika), Atenna (Galactika), and Woo Bin (Galactika), and arranged by Team Galactika. The English version was written by Star Wars (Galactika) and Sophia Pae.

== Background and release ==
On August 13, 2021, JYP Entertainment announced that Itzy would be releasing their first studio album titled Crazy in Love on September 24, with "Loco" announced as the lead single. On September 7, the group teaser photo was released. On September 20, a highlight medley teaser video was released. On September 22, the music video teaser was released. The song along with the music video was released on September 24.

The Japanese version of "Loco" was released as digital single on December 1, 2021. The Japanese lyrics were written by Jun.

== Composition ==
Korean version

English version

Japanese version

"Loco" was written by Star Wars (Galactika), composed by Star Wars (Galactika), Athena (Galactika), and Woo Bin (Galactika), and arranged by Team Galactika. The English version was written by Star Wars (Galactika) with Sophia Pae. "Loco" was composed in the key of C-sharp major, with a tempo of 102 beats per minute.

== Commercial performance ==
"Loco" debuted at position 97 on South Korea's Gaon Digital Chart in the chart issue dated September 19–25, 2021. The song then ascended to position 26 in the chart issue dated October 3–9, 2021. The song debuted at position 44, 27, and 4 on Billboard's Global 200, K-pop Hot 100, and World Digital Song Sales, respectively, in the chart issue dated October 9, 2021. The song debuted at position 5 on Singapore's RIAS's Top Streaming Chart in the chart issue dated September 24–30, 2021. The song also debuted at position 4 on RIAS Top Regional Chart in the chart issue dated September 24–30, 2021.

== Promotion ==
Prior to the album's release, on September 24, 2021, Itzy held a live event called "ITZY #OUTNOW COMEBACK SHOW" on Naver Now to introduce the album and communicate with their fans. Following the release of the album, the group performed "Loco" on four music programs: KBS2's Music Bank on September 24, MBC's Show! Music Core on September 25, SBS's Inkigayo on September 26, and Mnet's M Countdown on September 30. The group also performed on The Kelly Clarkson Show on September 27.

== Accolades ==
"Loco" received three music program awards on Music Bank (October 8), Inkigayo (October 10), and M Countdown (October 14). At the 2022 MTV Video Music Awards, the song received a nomination for Best K-Pop. At the 2021 Asian Pop Music Awards, it was nominated for Best Arranger (Overseas) (Note: Team Galactika credited as nominee) and Top 20 Songs of the Year – Overseas, winning the latter. It was also nominated for Artist of the Year – Digital Music (September) at the 11th Gaon Chart Music Awards.

== Credits and personnel ==
Credits adapted from Melon.

Studio

- JYPE Studios – recording, digital editing
- Galactika Studios – recording, editing
- Canton House Studios – mixing
- Sterling Sound – mastering

Personnel

- Itzy – vocals, background vocals
- Star Wars (Galactika) – Korean lyrics, composition, recording
- Athena (Galactika) – composition, digital editing, synthesizer, keyboard, bass
- Woo Bin (Galactika) – composition, synthesizer, keyboard, bass
- Team Galactika – arrangement
- Chang (Galactika) – drums, keyboard, bass
- Park Cella Kim – guitar
- Friday (Galactika) – background vocals, vocal directing
- e.NA (Galactika) – background vocals
- OGI (Galactika) – background vocals
- Sophia Pae – English lyrics, background vocals
- Aiden – background vocals
- Um Se-hee – recording, digital editing
- Park Eun-jung – recording
- Jaycen Joshua – mixing
- Jacob Richards – mixing (assistant)
- Mike Seaberg – mixing (assistant)
- DJ Riggins – mixing (assistant)
- Chris Gehringer – mastering

== Charts ==
=== Weekly charts ===
Weekly chart performance
Chart (2021)	Peak position
Global 200 (Billboard)	44
Hungary (Single Top 40)	20
Japan (Japan Hot 100)	46
Malaysia (RIM)	11
New Zealand Hot Singles (RMNZ)	13
Singapore (RIAS)	5
South Korea (Gaon)	26
South Korea (K-pop Hot 100)	23
UK Independent (Official Charts)	48
US World Digital Song Sales (Billboard)	4

=== Monthly charts ===
Monthly chart performance
Chart (2021)	Peak position
South Korea (Gaon)	32
South Korea (K-pop Hot 100)	26

== Release history ==
Release history
Region	Date	Format	Label	Ref.
Various	September 24, 2021	CD; digital download; streaming	JYP	

== See also ==
- List of Music Bank Chart winners (2021)
