= In the Morning (Itzy song) =

2021 single by Itzy

- English version cover

Single by Itzy

from the EP Guess Who
- Released: April 30, 2021
- Recorded: 2021
- Studio: JYPE Studios, Seoul
- Genre: Hip-hop; trap; dance
- Length: 2:52
- Label: JYP
- Composers: Lyre; J.Y. Park "The Asiansoul"; Kass; Earattack; Lee Hae-sol
- Lyricists: Lyre; J.Y. Park "The Asiansoul"; Kass; Danke

Itzy singles chronology
"Not Shy" (2020)	"In the Morning" (2021)	"Loco" (2021)

Music video
- "In the Morning" on YouTube

"In the Morning" (also called "Mafia in the Morning"; Korean: 마.피.아. In the morning; RR: Ma.pi.a in the morning) is a song recorded by South Korean girl group Itzy. It was released on April 30, 2021, through JYP Entertainment, as the lead single from the group's fourth extended play, Guess Who. An English version was released as a single on May 14, 2021. It was produced by JYP Entertainment's founder, J.Y. Park, alongside South Korean songwriters Danke and Kass and composer Lee Hae-sol.

"In the Morning" was described as a song about secretly stealing someone's heart. Musically, it is a hip hop, trap and dance track with its title referring to the popular party game Mafia, and a metaphor for aiming to be caught in a relationship. The accompanying music video, directed by Bang Jae Yeob, sports a dark atmosphere and depicts Itzy performing fierce choreography on various glamorous sets.

Commercially, the song became the group's fifth top-ten hit, peaking at number ten on the Gaon Digital Chart and at number seven on the Billboard K-pop Hot 100. It also peaked at number three on Billboard World Digital Songs and number 22 on the Global Excl. U.S. chart.

== Background and release ==
On April 12, 2021, the group unveiled the track listing to the EP on the group's official SNS accounts and website, revealing "In the Morning" as the lead single. Starting from April 13, the group's label uploaded various teasers for each member on their respective social media accounts. The first music video teaser for "In the Morning" was released on April 26. On the next day, the second music video teaser for the song was published. On April 28, the third music video teaser for the lead single was published. "In the Morning" was released for digital download and streaming as the lead single from Guess Who on April 30, 2021, by JYP Entertainment. The English version of "In the Morning" was released on May 14, along with the song's lyric video.

Itzy's first compilation album It'z Itzy, released on December 22, 2021, includes both Korean and Japanese-language versions of "In the Morning". The Japanese lyrics were written by Yuka Matsumoto.

== Composition ==
"In the Morning" was written by Park Jin-young, Kass, Danke and Lyre. The song is a "powerful" hip hop track with an "addictive" dance-trap composition, heightening the track's core concepts of ambiguity and suspense. The track's chorus sees the group explore various vocal styles backed by a "trippy" synth. Lyrically, the song is about secretly stealing someone's heart. The title is a reference to the popular party game Mafia, and a metaphor for aiming to be caught in a relationship. Itzy compare their power to a mafia as they vow to win their future partner over. In terms of musical notation, the song is composed in the key of B minor, with a tempo of 140 beats per minute.

The song is inspired by the mafia game, the werewolves, where the main character has to hide their emotions and act very differently. The song talks about relating that to capturing someone's heart. This song is a way for us to show different sides of ourselves. The performance is really something very special like with through this song. So, I really want you to look forward to our performance too.

— Yeji on the inspiration behind the song.

== Critical reception ==
"In the Morning" was met with mixed reviews from music critics. Writing for Forbes, Jeff Benjamin described the song as a "sinister" hip hop track with "one of their boldest and most experimental sounds yet". Divyansha Dongre from the India version of Rolling Stone noted that the song "sees the group explore various new vocal styles". In a mixed review, Sofiana Ramli of NME felt that the track "sounds like almost every other EDM-oriented song that's been churned out in K-pop today". Joshua Minsoo Kim of Pitchfork found that, although their debut "established the quintet as a massive new force in the industry", their latest release, "In the Morning", was the biggest offender from Guess Who, commenting that in the song "there's a Cardi B lilt in the verses, but it otherwise feels like Blackpink without the stadium-sized grandeur".

== Commercial performance ==
"In the Morning" debuted and peaked at number 22 on the Global Excl. U.S. chart with 36.2 million streams outside the US and also at number 34 on the Global 200 chart, becoming their highest entry on both. By doubling their total number of appearances, the band became the second-ever girl group from South Korea to hit the ranking more than once. The song peaked at number ten on South Korea's Gaon Digital Chart with chart issue dated May 9–15, 2021, making it Itzy's fifth top ten single on the chart.

== Music video and promotion ==
A still of Itzy dancing surrounded by flames, from the music video for "In the Morning".

Three teaser videos were released prior to the song's release. An accompanying music video was uploaded to JYP Entertainment's YouTube channel on April 30, 2021. It was directed by Bang Jae Yeob. In three days, the music video reached fifty million views. After one week, the video suprassed over 70 million views. The dance practice video was uploaded on May 2, 2021, and has received over 6 million views as of May 2021. On May 22, 2021, the music video hit 100 million views, which took only 22 days and 12 hours to achieved, becoming the quickest of the group's videos to reach the milestone. The music video opens with Ryujin in a cropped jacket and pleated skirt posing among mannequins in a fashion shop. The next scene shows the group all in black while dancing in a streets in a small town. The scene shifts to a quaint floral greenhouse, where Lia is shown singing in a floral gown with Itzy dressed in elegant clothes. Later in the clip, the girl group showcase their fierce choreography on a set decorated with samurai swords. Then, Yuna is shown next to a mirror in a neon green draped dress with a black bodysuit. In the next part, the group is dancing surrounded by flames.

To promote "In the Morning", the group appeared and performed on several South Korean music programs including M! Countdown, Music Bank, and Show! Music Core. An English version of the song was released as a digital single on May 14, 2021.

== Track listing ==
- Digital download and streaming (English version)
1. "In the Morning" (English version) – 2:52

== Credits and personnel ==
Credits adapted from Melon.

Recording and management

- Original published by JYP Publishing (KOMCA), Big Stage Music LLC, BMG Gold Songs, Lalala Studio, Copyright Control
- Sub-published by JYP Publishing (KOMCA), Fujipacific Music Korea Inc., Copyright Control
- Instrumental recording and production at LYRE Lair
- Digital edited, recorded, mixed at JYPE Studios
- Mastered at Sterling Sound, United States

Personnel

- Itzy – lead vocals
- J.Y. Park "The Asiansoul" – lyrics, composition, arrangement, sessions all instruments, vocal director
- Kass – lyrics, composition
- Danke – lyrics
- Lyre – lyrics, composition, arrangement
- Earattack – composition, arrangement, keyboard
- Lee Hae-sol – composition, arrangement, sessions all instruments
- Alina Smith – instrumental recording and production
- Annalise Morelli – instrumental recording and production
- Sound Kim – background vocals
- Uhm Se-hee – digital editing, recording
- Gu Hye-jin – recording
- Lee Tae-seop – mixing
- Chris Gehringer – mastering

== Accolades ==
Awards and nominations for "In the Morning"
Year	Organization	Award	Result	Ref.
2021	Asian Pop Music Awards	Top 20 Songs of the Year (Overseas)	Won	
2021	Asian Pop Music Awards	Song of the Year (Overseas)	Nominated	
2021	Mnet Asian Music Awards	Best Dance Performance Female Group	Nominated	
2021	Mnet Asian Music Awards	Song of the Year	Nominated	
2022	Gaon Chart Music Awards	Artist of the Year – Digital Music (April)	Nominated	
2022	Golden Disc Awards	Best Digital Song (Bonsang)	Nominated	
2022	Joox Thailand Music Awards	Korean Song of the Year	Nominated	

Music program awards
Program	Date (5 total)	Ref.
M Countdown	May 6, 2021	
M Countdown	May 13, 2021	
Show Champion	May 12, 2021	
Music Bank	May 14, 2021	
Inkigayo	May 16, 2021	

== Charts ==
=== Weekly charts ===
Peak chart performance
Chart (2021)	Peak position
Canada Hot 100 (Billboard)	97
Global 200 (Billboard)	34
Japan (Japan Hot 100)	36
Japan Combined Singles (Oricon)	39
Malaysia (RIM)	8
Netherlands (Dutch Global Top 40)	21
New Zealand Hot Singles (RMNZ)	12
Singapore (RIAS)	2
South Korea (Gaon)	10
South Korea (K-pop Hot 100)	7
UK Independent (Official Charts)	49
US World Digital Song Sales (Billboard)	3

=== Monthly charts ===
Chart (2021)	Peak Position
South Korea (Gaon)	11

=== Year-end charts ===
Chart (2021)	Position
South Korea (Gaon)	89

== Release history ==
Release formats for "In the Morning"
Region	Date	Format	Version	Label	Ref.
Various	April 30, 2021	Digital download, streaming	Original (Korean)	JYP	
Various	May 14, 2021	Digital download, streaming	English	JYP	

== See also ==
- List of Music Bank Chart winners (2021)
