= List of K-pop albums on the Billboard charts =

Current Billboard logo.

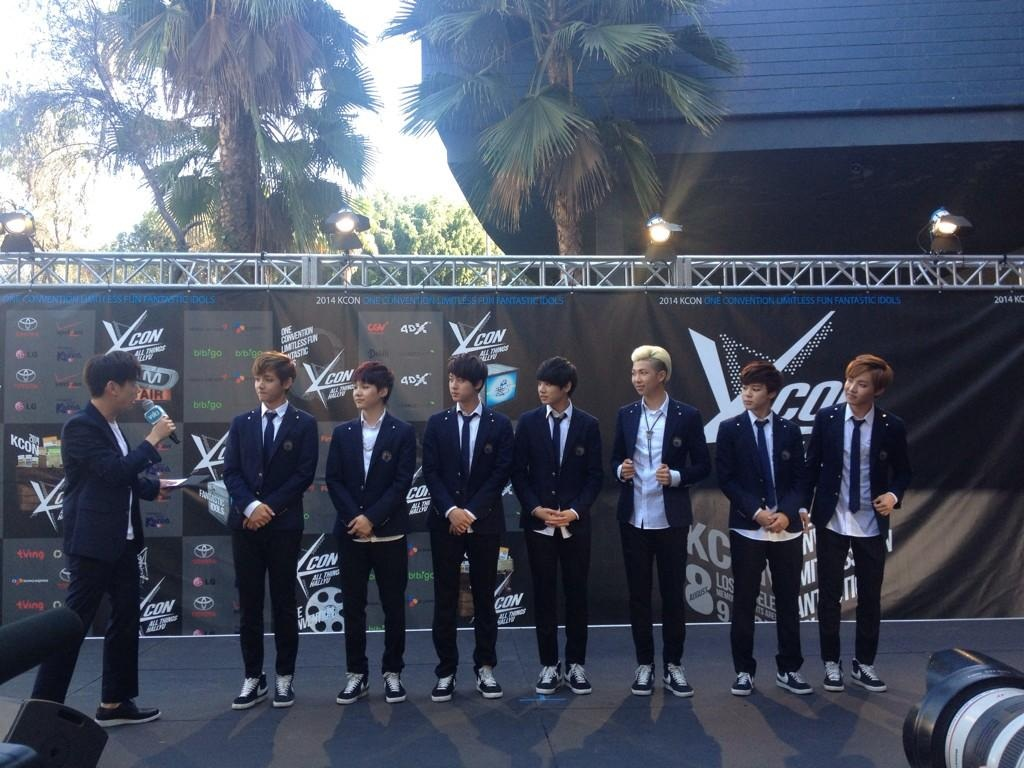
Eric Nam introducing BTS at KCON 2014 red carpet, August 10.

List of K-pop albums on the Billboard charts is a compilation of weekly chart information for K-pop music published by the Billboard charts, and reported on by Billboard K-Town, an online Billboard column. This is a list of K-pop albums, EPs and releases by K-pop artists on the Billboard charts.

== 2009–present ==
- This list depends on continual updates taken from *Billboard artist/title/chart search and *Billboard charts.
- Charts with all updates 2009–present are marked (Complete).
- Billboard artists comprehensive update incomplete.
- Billboard charts comprehensive update incomplete.
- The list is currently minus portions of Psy performance on 58 charts.
- The list is exclusive of Korea K-Pop Hot 100 data.
- Figures in red highlight indicate the highest rating received by K-pop artists on that chart.
- – Current week's charting

=== Billboard 200 (Complete) ===
| Chart date | Artist | Song/Album title | Peak position | Weeks on chart |
|---|---|---|---|---|
| 2009-04-04 | BoA | BoA | 127 | 1 |
| 2012-03-17 | Big Bang | Alive | 150 | 1 |
| 2012-05-12 | Girls' Generation-TTS | Twinkle | 126 | 1 |
| 2012-09-29 | G-Dragon | One of a Kind | 161 | 1 |
| 2013-09-21 | G-Dragon | Coup d'Etat Pt.1 | 182 | 1 |
| 2014-03-15 | 2NE1 | Crush | 61 | 1 |
| 2014-03-15 | Girls' Generation | Mr.Mr. | 110 | 1 |
| 2014-05-24 | Exo-K | Overdose | 129 | 1 |
| 2014-06-21 | Taeyang | Rise | 112 | 1 |
| 2015-04-18 | Exo | Exodus | 95 | 1 |
| 2015-12-19 | BTS | The Most Beautiful Moment In Life, Part 2 | 171 | 1 |
| 2016-05-21 | BTS | The Most Beautiful Moment In Life: Young Forever | 107 | 1 |
| 2016-10-29 | BTS | Wings | 26 | 2 |
| 2016-12-31 | BigBang | Made | 172 | 1 |
| 2017-03-04 | BTS | You Never Walk Alone | 61 | 2 |
| 2017-06-24 | G-Dragon | Kwon Ji Yong | 192 | 1 |
| 2017-08-05 | Exo | The War | 87 | 1 |
| 2017-10-07 | BTS | Love Yourself: Her | 7 | 7 (R) 45 |
| 2018-02-03 | Jonghyun | Poet ｜ Artist | 177 | 1 |
| 2018-03-10 | J-Hope | Hope World | 38 | 2 |
| 2018-04-14 | BTS | Face Yourself | 43 | 1 |
| 2018-06-02 | BTS | Love Yourself: Tear | 1 (Note: Entered at No. 1 for 1 week) | 15 (R) 16 |
| 2018-06-30 | Blackpink | Square Up | 40 | 1 |
| 2018-09-08 | BTS | Love Yourself: Answer | 1 | 31 (R) 100 |
| 2018-10-27 | NCT 127 | Regular-Irregular | 86 | 1 |
| 2018-11-03 | RM | mono. | 26 | 1 |
| 2018-11-17 | Exo | Don't Mess Up My Tempo | 23 | 2 |
| 2019-01-26 | Pinkfong | Pinkfong Presents: The Best of Baby Shark | 100 | 1 (R) 13 |
| 2019-03-16 | TXT | The Dream Chapter: Star | 140 | 1 |
| 2019-04-20 | Blackpink | Kill This Love | 24 | 4 |
| 2019-04-27 | BTS | Map of the Soul: Persona | 1 | 22 (R) 35 |
| 2019-06-08 | NCT 127 | We Are Superhuman | 11 | 1 |
| 2019-07-13 | BTS | BTS World: Original Soundtrack | 26 | 1 (R) 5 |
| 2019-10-19 | SuperM | SuperM | 1 | 9 (R) 10 |
| 2019-12-14 | Exo | Obsession | 182 | 2 |
| 2020-02-29 | Monsta X | All About Luv | 5 | 2 |
| 2020-03-07 | BTS | Map of the Soul: 7 | 1 | 82 (R) 95 |
| 2020-03-21 | NCT 127 | Neo Zone | 5 | 4 (R) 10 |
| 2020-06-06 | Agust D | D-2 | 11 | 1 |
| 2020-06-13 | Twice | More & More | 200 | 1 |
| 2020-07-25 | BTS | Map of the Soul: 7 - The Journey | 14 | 1 (R) 4 |
| 2020-10-10 | SuperM | Super One | 2 | 4 |
| 2020-10-17 | Blackpink | The Album | 2 | 26 |
| 2020-10-31 | NCT | NCT 2020 Resonance Pt. 1 | 6 | 9 |
| 2020-10-31 | BTS | Skool Luv Affair | 12 | 2 |
| 2020-11-07 | Loona | [12:00] | 112 | 1 |
| 2020-11-21 | TXT | Minisode1: Blue Hour | 25 | 2 |
| 2020-12-05 | BTS | Be | 1 | 37 |
| 2020-12-19 | Twice | Eyes Wide Open | 72 | 1 |
| 2021-02-27 | TXT | Still Dreaming | 173 | 1 |
| 2021-05-15 | Itzy | Guess Who | 148 | 1 |
| 2021-05-29 | Enhypen | Border: Carnival | 18 | 2 |
| 2021-06-19 | TXT | The Chaos Chapter: Freeze | 5 | 9 (R) 13 |
| 2021-06-26 | Twice | Taste of Love | 6 | 3 |
| 2021-07-03 | Seventeen | Your Choice | 15 | 1 |
| 2021-08-21 | BTS | BTS, the Best | 19 | 2 |
| 2021-09-25 | Ateez | Zero: Fever Part.3 | 42 | 1 |
| 2021-10-02 | NCT 127 | Sticker | 3 | 17 |
| 2021-10-09 | Itzy | Crazy in Love | 11 | 2 |
| 2021-10-23 | Aespa | Savage | 20 | 1 (R) 2 |
| 2021-10-30 | Enhypen | Dimension: Dilemma | 11 | 2 (R) 3 |
| 2021-11-06 | Seventeen | Attacca | 13 | 2 |
| 2021-11-27 | Twice | Formula of Love: O+T=<3 | 3 | 8 |
| 2021-12-18 | TXT | Chaotic Wonderland | 177 | 1 |
| 2021-12-25 | Monsta X | The Dreaming | 21 | 2 |
| 2021-12-25 | Ateez | Zero: Fever Epilogue | 73 | 1 |
| 2022-01-01 | NCT | Universe | 20 | 4 |
| 2022-01-29 | Enhypen | Dimension: Answer | 14 | 3 |
| 2022-04-02 | Stray Kids | Oddinary | 1 | 7 |
| 2022-04-09 | NCT Dream | Glitch Mode | 50 | 1 |
| 2022-05-28 | TXT | Minisode 2: Thursday's Child | 4 | 14 |
| 2022-06-18 | Seventeen | Face the Sun | 7 | 7 |
| 2022-06-25 | BTS | Proof | 1 | 41 |
| 2022-07-09 | Nayeon | Im Nayeon | 7 | 5 |
| 2022-07-23 | Aespa | Girls | 3 | 3 |
| 2022-07-30 | Itzy | Checkmate | 8 | 3 |
| 2022-07-30 | J-Hope | Jack in the Box | 6 | 1 (R) 3 |
| 2022-08-06 | Seventeen | Sector 17 | 4 | 4 |
| 2022-08-13 | Ateez | The World EP.1: Movement | 3 | 1 |
| 2022-08-13 | Enhypen | Manifesto: Day 1 | 6 | 7 (R) 8 |
| 2022-09-10 | Twice | Between 1&2 | 3 | 8 |
| 2022-09-24 | Jackson Wang | "Magic Man" | 15 | 1 |
| 2022-10-01 | Blackpink | Born Pink | 1 | 11 (R) 13 |
| 2022-10-01 | NCT 127 | 2 Baddies | 3 | 5 (R) 7 |
| 2022-10-22 | Stray Kids | Maxident | 1 | 6 |
| 2022-11-05 | Le Sserafim | Antifragile | 14 | 2 |
| 2022-11-05 | (G)I-dle | I Love | 71 | 1 |
| 2022-12-17 | RM | Indigo | 3 | 1 (R) 7 |
| 2022-12-17 | Itzy | Cheshire | 25 | 2 |
| 2023-01-14 | Ateez | Spin Off: From the Witness | 7 | 2 (R) 3 |
| 2023-02-11 | TXT | The Name Chapter: Temptation | 1 | 19 |
| 2023-03-18 | NCT 127 | Ay-Yo | 13 | 2 |
| 2023-03-25 | Twice | Ready to Be | 2 | 9 (R) 11 |
| 2023-04-08 | Jimin | Face | 2 | 6 (R) 7 |
| 2023-04-08 | Nmixx | Expérgo | 122 | 1 |
| 2023-04-15 | Xikers | House Of Tricky: Doorbell Ringing | 75 | 1 |
| 2023-05-06 | Agust D | D-Day | 2 | 5 (R) 6 |
| 2023-05-13 | Seventeen | FML | 2 | 9 |
| 2023-05-20 | Le Sserafim | Unforgiven | 6 | 8 |
| 2023-06-03 | (G)I-dle | I Feel | 41 | 2 |
| 2023-06-17 | Stray Kids | 5-Star | 1 | 16 |
| 2023-06-17 | Enhypen | Dark Blood | 4 | 8 (R) 10 |
| 2023-06-24 | P1Harmony | Harmony: All In | 51 | 1 |
| 2023-07-01 | Ateez | The World EP.2: Outlaw | 2 | 5 |
| 2023-07-15 | Aespa | My World | 9 | 3 |
| 2023-08-05 | NewJeans | Get Up | 1 | 26 |
| 2023-08-19 | Itzy | Kill My Doubt | 23 | 2 |
| 2023-08-19 | TXT | Sweet | 54 | 1 |
| 2023-09-02 | Jihyo | Zone | 14 | 2 |
| 2023-09-02 | NCT Dream | ISTJ | 28 | 3 |
| 2023-09-23 | V | Layover | 2 | 7 (R) 8 |
| 2023-09-23 | BoyNextDoor | Why.. | 162 | 1 |
| 2023-10-07 | The Rose | Dual | 83 | 1 |
| 2023-10-14 | NCT | Golden Age | 66 | 1 |
| 2023-10-21 | NCT 127 | Fact Check | 16 | 2 (R) 3 |
| 2023-10-21 | (G)I-dle | Heat | 25 | 1 |
| 2023-10-21 | DPR Ian | Dear Insanity | 138 | 1 |
| 2023-10-28 | TXT | The Name Chapter: Freefall | 3 | 7 (R) 8 |
| 2023-11-11 | Seventeen | Seventeenth Heaven | 2 | 5 |
| 2023-11-18 | Jungkook | Golden | 2 | 24 (R) 25 |
| 2023-11-25 | Stray Kids | Rock-Star | 1 | 14 |
| 2023-11-25 | Aespa | Drama | 33 | 2 |
| 2023-12-02 | Enhypen | Orange Blood | 4 | 7 |
| 2023-12-16 | Ateez | The World EP.Fin: Will | 1 | 6 |
| 2024-02-03 | Nmixx | Fe3O4: Break | 171 | 1 |
| 2024-02-24 | P1Harmony | Killin' It | 39 | 2 |
| 2024-02-24 | Itzy | Born to Be | 62 | 1 |
| 2024-03-09 | Twice | With You-th | 1 | 5 |
| 2024-03-09 | Le Sserafim | Easy | 8 | 5 |
| 2024-03-16 | (G)I-dle | 2 | 132 | 1 |
| 2024-03-23 | Xikers | House Of Tricky: Trial and Error | 73 | 1 |
| 2024-04-13 | J-Hope | Hope on the Street Vol. 1 | 5 | 2 |
| 2024-04-20 | TXT | Minisode 3: Tomorrow | 3 | 4 (R) 7 |
| 2024-05-04 | BoyNextDoor | How? | 93 | 1 |
| 2024-05-11 | Illit | Super Real Me | 93 | 1 |
| 2024-05-18 | Seventeen | 17 Is Right Here | 5 | 5 |
| 2024-06-08 | RM | Right Place, Wrong Person | 5 | 2 |
| 2024-06-15 | Ateez | Golden Hour: Part.1 | 2 | 7 |
| 2024-06-29 | Nayeon | Na | 7 | 2 |
| 2024-06-20 | Aespa | Armageddon | 25 | 2 |
| 2024-07-27 | Enhypen | Romance: Untold | 2 | 10 (R) 19 |
| 2024-08-03 | Stray Kids | Ate | 1 | 14 (R) 15 |
| 2024-08-03 | Jimin | Muse | 2 | 34 |
| 2024-08-03 | NCT 127 | Walk | 117 | 1 |
| 2024-08-17 | Red Velvet | Cosmic | 145 | 1 |
| 2024-09-14 | Le Sserafim | Crazy | 7 | 4 |
| 2024-09-28 | BoyNextDoor | 19.99 | 40 | 1 |
| 2024-10-05 | P1Harmony | Sad Song | 16 | 1 |
| 2024-11-02 | Seventeen | Spill the Feels | 5 | 4 |
| 2024-11-09 | Aespa | Whiplash | 50 | 1 |
| 2024-11-09 | Itzy | Gold | 60 | 1 |
| 2024-11-16 | Babymonster | Drip | 149 | 1 |
| 2024-11-23 | TXT | The Star Chapter: Sanctuary | 2 | 4 |
| 2024-11-23 | Illit | I'll Like You | 94 | 1 |
| 2024-11-23 | Kep1er | Tipi-tap | 147 | 1 |
| 2024-11-30 | Ateez | Golden Hour: Part.2 | 1 | 3 |
| 2024-11-30 | Jin | Happy | 4 | 3 |
| 2024-12-21 | Rosé | Rosie | 3 | 26 (R) 27 |
| 2024-12-21 | Twice | Strategy | 4 | 4 |
| 2024-12-28 | Stray Kids | Hop | 1 | 13 |
| 2025-03-15 | Lisa | Alter Ego | 7 | 4 |
| 2025-03-22 | Jennie | Ruby | 7 | 10 (R) 11 |
| 2025-03-29 | Le Sserafim | Hot | 9 | 2 |
| 2025-04-19 | Zerobaseone | Blue Paradise | 28 | 1 |
| 2025-05-24 | P1Harmony | Duh! | 23 | 1 |
| 2025-05-31 | Jin | Echo | 3 | 2 |
| 2025-05-31 | BoyNextDoor | No Genre | 62 | 1 |
| 2025-06-07 | Baekhyun | Essence of Reverie | 121 | 1 |
| 2025-06-14 | Seventeen | Happy Burstday | 2 | 3 |
| 2025-06-21 | Enhypen | Desire: Unleash | 3 | 6 (R) 7 |
| 2025-06-28 | Ateez | Golden Hour: Part.3 | 2 | 2 (R) 5 |
| 2025-07-05 | KPop Demon Hunters | KPop Demon Hunters (soundtrack) | 1 (Total 2 weeks) (Note: Peaked at No. 1 on 2025-09-20 (2 weeks)) | 73 |
| 2025-07-12 | Illit | Bomb | 171 | 1 |
| 2025-07-26 | Twice | This Is For | 6 | 16 |
| 2025-08-02 | BTS | Permission to Dance on Stage – Live | 10 | 2 |
| 2025-08-02 | Jackson Wang | "Magic Man 2" | 13 | 1 |
| 2025-08-09 | TXT | The Star Chapter: Together | 3 | 4 |
| 2025-09-06 | Stray Kids | Karma | 1 | 19 |
| 2025-09-20 | Aespa | Rich Man | 12 | 1 |
| 2025-09-20 | Zerobaseone | Never Say Never | 23 | 1 |
| 2025-09-20 | Monsta X | The X | 31 | 1 |
| 2025-09-27 | Cortis | Color Outside the Lines | 15 | 2 (R) 5 |
| 2025-09-27 | Chaeyoung | Lil Fantasy Vol. 1 | 38 | 1 |
| 2025-10-11 | P1Harmony | Ex | 9 | 2 |
| 2025-10-25 | Twice | Ten: The Story Goes On | 11 | 1 |
| 2025-10-25 | S.Coups X Mingyu | Hype Vibes | 71 | 1 |
| 2025-11-01 | Nmixx | Blue Valentine | 177 | 1 |
| 2025-11-08 | BoyNextDoor | The Action | 40 | 1 |
| 2025-11-22 | Yeonjun | No Labels: Part 01 | 10 | 2 |
| 2025-12-06 | Stray Kids | Do It | 1 | 12 |
| 2026-01-31 | Enhypen | The Sin: Vanish | 2 | 10 |
| 2026-01-31 | DK X Seungkwan | Serenade | 195 | 1 |
| 2026-02-21 | Ateez | Golden Hour: Part.4 | 3 | 5 |
| 2026-03-14 | Blackpink | Deadline | 8 | 4 |
| 2026-03-28 | P1Harmony | Unique | 4 | 2 |
| 2026-04-04 | BTS | Arirang | 1 (Total 3 weeks) (Note: Entered at No. 1 for three weeks) | 34 |
| 2026-04-18 | Monsta X | Unfold | 41 | 1 |
| 2026-05-02 | TXT | 7th Year: A Moment of Stillness in the Thorns | 3 | 2 |
| 2026-05-02 | Plave | Caligo Pt.2 | 145 | 1 |
| 2026-05-16 | Illit | Mamihlapinatapai | 26 | 1 |
| 2026-05-23 | Cortis | GreenGreen | 3 | 18 (R) 19 |
| 2026-05-30 | Nmixx | Heavy Serenade | 182 | 1 |
| 2026-06-06 | Le Sserafim | Pureflow Pt. 1 | 10 | 3 |
| 2026-06-13 | Aespa | Lemonade | 9 | 2 |
| 2026-06-27 | BoyNextDoor | Home | 16 | 1 (R) 2 |
| 2026-07-11 | Ateez | Golden Hour: Part.5 | 1 | 4 |
| 2026-07-25 | Yeonjun | No Labels: Part 02 | 16 | 1 |
| 2026-08-22 | Stray Kids | This & That | 1 | 14 |
| 2026-09-05 | Enhypen | The Sin: Bliss | 1 | 7 |
| 2026-09-12 | NCT 127 | Blingy | 129 | 1 |
| 2026-09-19 | Monsta X | The Phase | 118 | 1 |
| 2026-10-03 | Evan | Death of Me | 49 | 1 |
| 2026-10-10 | &Team | Mark on Me | 20 | 1 |
| 2026-10-31 | Plave | Hyperdrive | 31 | 1 |
| 2026-11-07 | Lisa | Press Play | 35 | 1 |
| 2026-11-14 | Illit | Break Even | 6 | 2 |
| 2026-11-14 | Ive | Looks Can Kill | 126 | 1 |
| 2026-11-21 | P1Harmony | Blow Up | 4 | 1 |

=== Canadian Albums ===
| Chart date | Artist | Song/Album title | Peak position | Weeks on chart |
|---|---|---|---|---|
| 2016-05-21 | BTS | The Most Beautiful Moment In Life: Young Forever | 99 | 1 |
| 2016-10-29 | BTS | Wings | 19 | 2 |
| 2017-03-04 | BTS | You Never Walk Alone | 35 | 1 |
| 2017-07-01 | G-Dragon | Kwon Ji Yong | 52 | 1 |
| 2017-08-05 | Exo | The War | 76 | 1 |
| 2017-10-07 | BTS | Love Yourself: Her | 3 | 28 |
| 2018-03-10 | J-Hope | Hope World | 35 | 2 |
| 2018-04-14 | BTS | Face Yourself | 40 | 1 |
| 2018-06-02 | BTS | Love Yourself: Tear | 2 | 15 |
| 2018-06-30 | Blackpink | Square Up | 21 | 1 |
| 2018-09-08 | BTS | Love Yourself: Answer | 1 | 35 (R) 40 |
| 2018-11-03 | RM | mono. | 22 | 1 |
| 2018-11-17 | Exo | Don't Mess Up My Tempo | 74 | 1 |
| 2019-03-16 | TXT | The Dream Chapter: Star | 100 | 1 |
| 2019-04-20 | Blackpink | Kill This Love | 8 | 4 |
| 2019-04-27 | BTS | Map of the Soul: Persona | 1 | 13 (R) 15 |
| 2019-06-08 | NCT 127 | We Are Superhuman | 64 | 1 |
| 2019-07-13 | BTS | BTS World: Original Soundtrack | 58 | 1 (R) 2 |
| 2019-10-19 | SuperM | SuperM | 38 | 2 |
| 2020-02-29 | Monsta X | All About Luv | 10 | 1 |
| 2020-03-07 | BTS | Map of the Soul: 7 | 1 | 20 (R) 24 |
| 2020-03-21 | NCT 127 | Neo Zone | 26 | 1 |
| 2020-06-06 | Agust D | D-2 | 12 | 1 |
| 2020-07-25 | BTS | Map of the Soul: 7 - The Journey | 90 | 1 |
| 2020-10-10 | SuperM | Super One | 69 | 2 |
| 2020-10-17 | Blackpink | The Album | 5 | 10 (R) 12 |
| 2020-11-07 | NCT | NCT 2020 Resonance Pt. 1 | 95 | 2 |
| 2020-12-05 | BTS | Be | 1 | 18 (R) 21 |
| 2021-06-19 | TXT | The Chaos Chapter: Freeze | 49 | 2 (R) 4 |
| 2021-06-26 | Twice | Taste of Love | 38 | 1 |
| 2021-08-21 | BTS | BTS, the Best | 45 | 2 |
| 2021-10-30 | Enhypen | Dimension: Dilemma | 50 | 1 |
| 2021-11-06 | Seventeen | Attacca | 48 | 1 |
| 2021-11-27 | Twice | Formula of Love: O+T=<3 | 17 | 1 |
| 2021-12-25 | Monsta X | The Dreaming | 76 | 1 |
| 2022-01-29 | Enhypen | Dimension: Answer | 79 | 2 |
| 2022-04-02 | Stray Kids | Oddinary | 20 | 2 |
| 2022-05-28 | TXT | Minisode 2: Thursday's Child | 44 | 2 |
| 2022-06-25 | BTS | Proof | 1 | 35 (R) 40 |
| 2022-07-09 | Nayeon | Im Nayeon | 54 | 1 |
| 2022-07-30 | J-Hope | Jack in the Box | 43 | 1 |
| 2022-09-10 | Twice | Between 1&2 | 40 | 2 |
| 2022-10-01 | Blackpink | Born Pink | 1 | 9 |
| 2022-10-22 | Stray Kids | Maxident | 18 | 3 |
| 2022-12-17 | RM | Indigo | 19 | 1 |
| 2023-02-11 | TXT | The Name Chapter: Temptation | 15 | 2 |
| 2023-03-25 | Twice | Ready to Be | 11 | 2 |
| 2023-04-08 | Jimin | Face | 10 | 3 |
| 2023-05-06 | Agust D | D-Day | 9 | 2 |
| 2023-05-13 | Seventeen | FML | 44 | 1 |
| 2023-05-20 | Le Sserafim | Unforgiven | 63 | 1 |
| 2023-06-17 | Stray Kids | 5-Star | 10 | 3 |
| 2023-08-05 | NewJeans | Get Up | 4 | 10 |
| 2023-09-23 | V | Layover | 39 | 2 |
| 2023-10-28 | TXT | The Name Chapter: Freefall | 63 | 1 |
| 2023-11-18 | Jungkook | Golden | 4 | 14 (R) 15 |
| 2023-11-25 | Stray Kids | Rock-Star | 21 | 2 |
| 2024-06-08 | RM | Right Place, Wrong Person | 56 | 1 |
| 2024-08-03 | Stray Kids | Ate | 21 | 2 |
| 2024-08-03 | Jimin | Muse | 24 | 3 |
| 2024-09-14 | Le Sserafim | Crazy | 81 | 1 |
| 2024-11-30 | Jin | Happy | 43 | 1 |
| 2024-11-30 | Ateez | Golden Hour: Part.2 | 94 | 1 |
| 2024-12-21 | Rosé | Rosie | 4 | 37 |
| 2024-12-28 | Stray Kids | Hop | 62 | 1 |
| 2025-08-29 | Stray Kids | Karma | 1 | 1 |
| 2025-03-15 | Lisa | Alter Ego | 21 | 2 |
| 2025-03-15 | G-Dragon | Übermensch | 71 | 1 |
| 2025-03-22 | Jennie | Ruby | 6 | 11 (R) 12 |
| 2025-05-31 | Jin | Echo | 65 | 1 |
| 2025-07-05 | KPop Demon Hunters | KPop Demon Hunters (soundtrack) | 1 (Total 5 weeks) (Note: Peaked at No. 1 on 2025-08-23 (3 weeks), 2025-10-04 (3 weeks)) | 73 |
| 2025-07-26 | Twice | This Is For | 58 | 1 |
| 2025-09-06 | Stray Kids | Karma | 11 | 2 |
| 2025-12-06 | Stray Kids | Do It | 14 | 1 |
| 2026-01-31 | Enhypen | The Sin: Vanish | 97 | 1 |
| 2026-03-14 | Blackpink | Deadline | 25 | 1 |
| 2026-04-04 | BTS | Arirang | 1 (Total 3 weeks) | 32 (R) 33 |
| 2026-08-22 | Stray Kids | This & That | 9 | 3 |

=== Catalog Albums ===
- previously called Top Pop Catalog Albums
- Chart started 1991-05-25 and discontinued 2026-03-07.
2009 – 2026

| Chart date | Artist | Song/Album title | Peak position | Weeks on chart |
|---|---|---|---|---|
| 2020-03-07 | BTS | Love Yourself: Answer | 24 | 1 (R) 19 |
| 2020-10-31 | BTS | Skool Luv Affair | 2 | 2 |
| 2021-09-04 | BTS | Map of the Soul: 7 | 41 | 3 (R) 4 |
| 2023-01-21 | BTS | Love Yourself: Her | 2 | 1 |
| 2024-03-09 | BTS | Love Yourself: Tear | 36 | 1 |

=== Dance/Electronic Albums ===
- also called Top Dance/Electronic Albums

| Chart date | Artist | Song/Album title | Peak position | Weeks on chart |
|---|---|---|---|---|
| 2009-04-04 | BoA | BoA | 5 | 6 |
| 2015-12-19 | Psy | Chiljip Psy-da | 7 | 1 |
| 2024-06-22 | Peggy Gou | I Hear You | 14 | 1 |
| 2024-08-19 | Woosung | 4444 | 6 | 1 |
| 2026-05-16 | Illit | Mamihlapinatapai | 1 | 10 (R) 12 |

=== Digital Albums ===
- Chart discontinued after 2020-01-18
2016 – 2020

| Chart date | Artist | Song/Album title | Peak position | Weeks on chart |
|---|---|---|---|---|
| 2016-10-29 | BTS | Wings | 7 | 1 |
| 2016-12-31 | Big Bang | Made | 24 | 1 |
| 2017-08-05 | Exo | The War | 10 | 1 |
| 2017-10-07 | BTS | Love Yourself: Her | 3 | 1 |
| 2018-02-03 | Jonghyun | Poet ｜ Artist | 15 | 1 |
| 2018-03-03 | Agust D | Agust D | 24 | 1 |
| 2018-03-10 | J-Hope | Hope World | 4 | 2 |
| 2018-03-24 | Got7 | Eyes on You | 21 | 1 |
| 2018-04-14 | BTS | Face Yourself | 10 | 1 |
| 2018-06-02 | BTS | Love Yourself: Tear | 2 | 2 |
| 2018-06-09 | Shinee | The Story of Light | 23 | 1 |
| 2018-06-30 | Blackpink | Square Up | 7 | 1 |
| 2018-08-18 | Red Velvet | Summer Magic | 21 | 1 |
| 2018-09-08 | BTS | Love Yourself: Answer | 4 | 1 |
| 2018-11-03 | RM | mono. | 4 | 1 |
| 2018-11-17 | Exo | Don't Mess Up My Tempo | 17 | 1 |
| 2019-03-16 | TXT | The Dream Chapter: Star | 10 | 1 |
| 2019-04-20 | Blackpink | Kill This Love | 6 | 2 |
| 2019-04-27 | BTS | Map of the Soul: Persona | 1 | 2 (R) 3 |
| 2019-05-04 | Twice | Fancy You | 22 | 1 |
| 2019-06-08 | NCT 127 | We Are Superhuman | 1 | 1 |
| 2019-07-13 | BTS | BTS World: Original Soundtrack | 12 | 1 |
| 2019-07-20 | Baekhyun | City Lights | 21 | 1 |
| 2019-10-19 | SuperM | SuperM | 1 | 2 (R) 4 |
| 2019-11-02 | TXT | The Dream Chapter: Magic | 14 | 1 |
| 2019-11-16 | Got7 | Call My Name | 21 | 1 |
| 2019-12-07 | Exo | Obsession | 18 | 1 |
| 2020-01-04 | Red Velvet | The ReVe Festival: Finale | 22 | 1 |

=== Heatseekers Albums (Complete) ===
- Chart reduced from 50 to 25 on 2014-12-20 and discontinued on 2024-11-29.
2009 – present

| Chart date | Artist | Song/Album title | Peak position | Weeks on chart |
|---|---|---|---|---|
| 2009-04-04 | BoA | BoA | 3 | 2 |
| 2010-07-10 | Wonder Girls | 2 Different Tears | 21 | 1 |
| 2011-03-12 | Big Bang | Tonight | 7 | 1 |
| 2011-05-14 | Jay Park | Take a Deeper Look | 26 | 1 |
| 2011-08-13 | 2NE1 | 2NE1 2nd Mini Album | 34 | 1 |
| 2011-08-20 | Super Junior | Mr. Simple | 41 | 1 |
| 2011-11-19 | Tablo | Fever's End: Part 2 | 21 | 1 |
| 2012-02-04 | Girls' Generation | The Boys | 17 | 1 (R) 2 |
| 2012-02-25 | Jay Park | New Breed | 16 | 1 |
| 2012-03-17 | BigBang | Alive | 4 | 2 |
| 2012-03-31 | Shinee | Sherlock | 10 | 2 |
| 2012-05-12 | Girls' Generation-TTS | Twinkle | 2 | 2 |
| 2012-06-16 | BigBang | Still Alive | 20 | 2 |
| 2012-06-30 | f(x) | Electric Shock | 21 | 1 |
| 2012-07-21 | Super Junior | Sexy, Free & Single | 37 | 1 |
| 2012-08-18 | Psy | Psy 6 (Six Rules), Part 1 | 24 | 6 |
| 2012-09-29 | G-Dragon | One of a Kind | 6 | 2 |
| 2013-01-19 | Girls' Generation | I Got a Boy | 2 | 2 |
| 2013-01-26 | Super Junior | Break Down | 49 | 1 |
| 2013-03-02 | B.A.P | One Shot | 24 | 1 |
| 2013-02-02 | CNBLUE | Re:Blue | 22 | 1 |
| 2013-03-09 | Shinee | Dream Girl – The Misconceptions of You | 5 | 1 |
| 2013-05-11 | Shinee | Why So Serious? – The Misconceptions of Me | 5 | 1 |
| 2013-06-22 | Exo | XOXO Repackage | 23 | 1 |
| 2013-06-22 | Henry | Trap | 45 | 1 |
| 2013-07-27 | Jay Park | I Like 2 Party (EP) | 45 | 1 |
| 2013-08-17 | f(x) | Pink Tape | 21 | 1 |
| 2013-08-24 | B.A.P | Badman | 42 | 1 |
| 2013-09-07 | Seungri | Let's Talk About Love | 34 | 1 |
| 2013-09-21 | G-Dragon | Coup d'Etat Pt.1 | 3 | 1 |
| 2013-09-21 | G-Dragon | Coup d'Etat Pt.2 | 5 | 1 |
| 2013-11-02 | Shinee | Everybody | 20 | 1 |
| 2013-12-28 | Exo | Miracles in December | 35 | 1 |
| 2014-02-22 | B.A.P | First Sensibility | 13 | 1 |
| 2014-03-15 | Girls' Generation | Mr.Mr. | 1 | 1 |
| 2014-03-15 | CNBLUE | Can't Stop | 32 | 1 |
| 2014-05-24 | Exo-K | Overdose | 1 | 2 |
| 2014-05-24 | Exo-M | Overdose | 8 | 1 |
| 2014-06-21 | Taeyang | Rise | 1 | 1 |
| 2014-07-26 | f(x) | Red Light | 13 | 1 |
| 2014-08-16 | JYJ | Just Us | 43 | 1 |
| 2014-08-31 | Winner | 2014 S/S | 6 | 1 |
| 2014-09-06 | Taemin | Ace | 20 | 1 |
| 2014-09-06 | BTS | Dark & Wild | 27 | 1 |
| 2014-09-13 | Super Junior | Mamacita | 39 | 1 |
| 2014-10-04 | Girls' Generation-TTS | Holler (EP) | 11 | 1 |
| 2014-11-08 | Epik High | Shoebox | 9 | 1 |
| 2014-11-08 | VIXX | Error | 42 | 1 |
| 2015-01-24 | Jonghyun | Base | 20 | 1 |
| 2015-02-28 | Amber | Beautiful | 19 | 1 |
| 2015-04-04 | Red Velvet | Ice Cream Cake | 24 | 1 |
| 2015-05-16 | BTS | The Most Beautiful Moment In Life, Part 1 | 6 | 1 |
| 2015-06-06 | Shinee | Odd | 9 | 1 |
| 2015-08-22 | Wonder Girls | Reboot | 25 | 1 |
| 2015-09-05 | Girls' Generation | Lion Heart | 7 | 1 |
| 2015-09-05 | VIXX LR | Beautiful Liar | 18 | 1 |
| 2015-09-26 | Red Velvet | The Red | 24 | 1 |
| 2015-10-17 | Got7 | Mad | 15 | 1 |
| 2015-10-24 | Taeyeon | I | 5 | 1 |
| 2015-11-14 | f(x) | 4 Walls | 7 | 1 |
| 2015-11-14 | IU | Chat-Shire | 19 | 1 |
| 2015-12-05 | B.A.P | Matrix | 15 | 1 |
| 2015-12-19 | BTS | The Most Beautiful Moment In Life, Part 2 | 1 | 2 (R) 5 |
| 2015-12-26 | Girls' Generation-TTS | Dear Santa | 14 | 1 |
| 2016-01-16 | iKon | Welcome Back | 23 | 1 |
| 2016-02-20 | Winner | Exit : E | 3 | 1 |
| 2016-03-12 | Taemin | Press It | 7 | 1 |
| 2016-03-12 | B.A.P | Carnival | 19 | 1 |
| 2016-03-26 | Lee Hi | Seoulite | 16 | 1 |
| 2016-04-09 | Got7 | Flight Log: Departure | 2 | 2 |
| 2016-04-16 | Dean | 130 Mood: TRBL | 22 | 1 |
| 2016-05-14 | Seventeen | First Love & Letter | 5 | 1 |
| 2016-05-21 | BTS | The Most Beautiful Moment In Life: Young Forever | 10 | 1 |
| 2016-05-28 | Tiffany Young | I Just Wanna Dance | 10 | 1 |
| 2016-06-04 | Jessica | With Love, J | 16 | 1 |
| 2016-06-11 | Jonghyun | She Is | 20 | 1 |
| 2016-07-16 | Taeyeon | Why | 15 | 1 |
| 2016-07-30 | NCT 127 | NCT 127 | 22 | 1 |
| 2016-09-24 | Red Velvet | Russian Roulette | 18 | 1 |
| 2016-10-01 | MOBB | The MOBB | 7 | 1 |
| 2016-10-15 | Got7 | Flight Log: Turbulence | 7 | 1 |
| 2016-10-22 | Shinee | 1 of 1 | 14 | 1 |
| 2016-10-22 | Monsta X | The Clan 2.5 Pt. 2 Guilty | 16 | 1 |
| 2016-11-19 | Blackpink | Square Two | 13 | 1 |
| 2016-11-19 | Lay | Lose Control | 23 | 1 |
| 2016-12-24 | Seventeen | Going Seventeen | 9 | 1 |
| 2016-12-31 | BigBang | Made | 1 | 4 |
| 2017-01-28 | NCT 127 | Limitless | 4 | 1 |
| 2017-02-04 | Seohyun | Don't Say No | 23 | 1 |
| 2017-02-18 | Red Velvet | Rookie | 21 | 1 |
| 2017-02-18 | Zion.T | OO | 24 | 1 |
| 2017-03-18 | Taeyeon | My Voice | 19 | 1 |
| 2017-04-01 | Got7 | Flight Log: Arrival | 3 | 1 |
| 2017-04-08 | Monsta X | The Clan Pt. 2.5: The Final Chapter | 10 | 1 |
| 2017-05-06 | Minzy | Minzy Work 01. "Uno" | 21 | 1 |
| 2017-05-13 | IU | Palette | 25 | 1 |
| 2017-06-03 | Twice | Signal | 11 | 1 |
| 2017-06-03 | VIXX | Shangri-La | 13 | 1 |
| 2017-06-10 | Seventeen | Al1 | 10 | 1 |
| 2017-06-24 | G-Dragon | Kwon Ji Yong | 1 | 2 |
| 2017-07-01 | NCT 127 | Cherry Bomb | 21 | 1 |
| 2017-07-29 | Red Velvet | The Red Summer | 8 | 1 |
| 2017-08-05 | Kard | Hola Hola | 25 | 1 |
| 2017-08-19 | JJ Project | Verse 2 | 9 | 1 |
| 2017-08-26 | Girls' Generation | Holiday Night | 5 | 1 |
| 2017-09-02 | Taeyang | White Night | 5 | 2 |
| 2017-10-28 | Got7 | 7 for 7 | 6 | 1 |
| 2017-11-11 | Epik High | We've Done Something Wonderful | 21 | 1 |
| 2017-11-18 | Twice | Twicetagram | 10 | 1 |
| 2017-11-25 | Seventeen | Teen, Age | 8 | 1 |
| 2017-11-25 | Monsta X | The Code | 12 | 1 |
| 2017-11-25 | Super Junior | Play | 15 | 1 |
| 2017-12-09 | Red Velvet | Perfect Velvet | 3 | 1 |
| 2017-12-09 | Kard | You & Me | 17 | 1 |
| 2018-01-20 | Stray Kids | Mixtape | 6 | 1 |
| 2018-02-10 | Red Velvet | Perfect Velvet | 7 | 1 |
| 2018-02-10 | iKon | Return | 9 | 1 |
| 2018-02-17 | Seventeen | Director's Cut | 2 | 1 |
| 2018-03-03 | Agust D | Agust D | 5 | 2 |
| 2018-03-24 | Got7 | Eyes on You | 21 | 1 |
| 2018-03-24 | NCT 2018 | NCT 2018 Empathy | 9 | 2 |
| 2018-04-07 | Monsta X | The Connect: Dejavu | 8 | 1 |
| 2018-04-07 | Stray Kids | I Am Not | 23 | 1 |
| 2018-04-21 | Twice | What Is Love? | 13 | 1 |
| 2018-04-28 | Super Junior | Replay | 19 | 1 |
| 2018-04-28 | VIXX | Eau de VIXX | 25 | 1 |
| 2018-06-09 | Shinee | The Story of Light | 2 | 1 |
| 2018-06-23 | Shinee | The Story of Light EP.2 | 5 | 1 |
| 2018-07-28 | Seventeen | You Make My Day | 7 | 1 |
| 2018-07-28 | Mamamoo | Red Moon | 25 | 1 |
| 2018-08-04 | Seungri | The Great Seungri | 12 | 1 |
| 2018-08-11 | iKon | New Kids: Continue | 15 | 1 |
| 2018-08-18 | Red Velvet | Summer Magic | 3 | 1 |
| 2018-08-18 | Stray Kids | I Am Who | 15 | 1 |
| 2018-09-01 | Loona | ++ | 4 | 1 |
| 2018-09-15 | NCT Dream | We Go Up | 7 | 1 |
| 2018-09-15 | Jooheon | DWTD | 22 | 1 |
| 2018-09-29 | Got7 | Present: You | 7 | 1 |
| 2018-11-03 | Monsta X | Take.1 Are You There? | 6 | 1 (R) 4 |
| 2018-11-03 | Stray Kids | I Am You | 16 | 1 (R) 4 |
| 2018-11-17 | Twice | Yes or Yes | 13 | 1 |
| 2018-12-15 | Red Velvet | RBB | 1 | 2 (R) 5 |
| 2018-12-15 | Onew | Voice | 21 | 1 |
| 2019-01-26 | Ateez | Treasure EP.2: Zero to One | 7 | 1 |
| 2019-01-26 | Astro | All Light | 23 | 1 |
| 2019-02-02 | Seventeen | You Made My Dawn | 13 | 1 |
| 2019-02-09 | CLC | No.1 | 19 | 1 |
| 2019-02-23 | Taemin | Want | 9 | 1 |
| 2019-03-02 | Loona | X X | 8 | 1 (R) 2 |
| 2019-03-02 | Monsta X | Take.2 We Are Here | 8 | 1 (R) 3 |
| 2019-03-09 | Tiffany Young | Lips on Lips | 9 | 1 |
| 2019-03-16 | TXT | The Dream Chapter: Star | 2 | 2 |
| 2019-03-23 | Epik High | Sleepless in | 21 | 1 |
| 2019-04-06 | Stray Kids | Clé 1: Miroh | 13 | 1 |
| 2019-04-13 | Chen | April, and a Flower | 7 | 1 |
| 2019-05-04 | Twice | Fancy You | 4 | 1 (R) 5 |
| 2019-06-01 | Got7 | Spinning Top | 9 | 1 |
| 2019-06-15 | Lee Hi | 24°C | 7 | 1 |
| 2019-06-22 | Ateez | Treasure EP.3: One to All | 9 | 1 |
| 2019-06-29 | Red Velvet | The ReVe Festival: Day 1 | 11 | 1 (R) 3 |
| 2019-06-29 | Stray Kids | Clé 2: Yellow Wood | 17 | 1 |
| 2019-07-06 | Chungha | Flourishing | 25 | 1 |
| 2019-07-20 | Baekhyun | City Lights | 4 | 4 |
| 2019-07-26 | Day6 | The Book of Us: Gravity | 20 | 1 |
| 2019-08-03 | Exo-SC | What a Life | 10 | 1 |
| 2019-08-10 | NCT Dream | We Boom | 6 | 1 |
| 2019-08-10 | Itzy | It'z Icy | 19 | 1 |
| 2019-08-31 | Red Velvet | The ReVe Festival: Day 2 | 11 | 3 (R) 5 |
| 2019-09-28 | Seventeen | An Ode | 25 | 1 |
| 2019-10-05 | Twice | Feel Special | 10 | 1 |
| 2019-10-19 | Ateez | Treasure EP.Fin: All to Action | 10 | 1 |
| 2019-11-02 | TXT | The Dream Chapter: Magic | 6 | 1 (R) 7 |
| 2019-11-09 | Taeyeon | Purpose | 14 | 1 |
| 2019-11-09 | Monsta X | Follow: Find You | 15 | 1 (R) 2 |
| 2019-11-16 | Got7 | Call My Name | 8 | 1 |
| 2019-12-21 | Stray Kids | Clé: Levanter | 18 | 1 |
| 2020-01-04 | Red Velvet | The ReVe Festival: Finale | 2 | 5 (R) 6 |
| 2020-01-18 | Ateez | Treasure Epilogue: Action to Answer | 19 | 1 |
| 2020-02-15 | Loona | # | 19 | 1 |
| 2020-05-02 | Got7 | Dye | 9 | 1 |
| 2020-05-30 | TXT | The Dream Chapter: Eternity | 8 | 1 (R) 6 |
| 2020-06-06 | Baekhyun | Delight | 13 | 1 |
| 2020-06-13 | Twice | More & More | 3 | 2 |
| 2020-07-04 | Stray Kids | Go Live | 3 | 4 (R) 5 |
| 2020-07-18 | Red Velvet – Irene & Seulgi | "Monster" | 12 | 1 |
| 2020-09-19 | Wonho | Love Synonym Pt.1: Right for Me | 19 | 1 |
| 2020-09-26 | Stray Kids | In Life | 4 | 2 |
| 2020-10-24 | NCT | NCT 2020 Resonance Pt. 1 | 5 | 1 |
| 2020-10-31 | Loona | [12:00] | 1 (Note: Peaked 2nd week, 2020-11-07 (1 week)) | 2 |
| 2020-11-07 | Twice | Eyes Wide Open | 4 | 3 |
| 2020-11-14 | TXT | Minisode1: Blue Hour | 10 | 1 |
| 2020-12-12 | Got7 | Breath of Love: Last Piece | 4 | 1 (R) 2 |
| 2020-12-12 | Kai | Kai (EP) | 7 | 1 |
| 2021-01-02 | Enhypen | Border: Day One | 8 | 1 |
| 2021-03-06 | Shinee | Don't Call Me | 14 | 1 |
| 2021-03-13 | Ateez | Zero: Fever Part.2 | 9 | 2 (R) 4 |
| 2021-04-10 | IU | Lilac | 18 | 1 |
| 2021-05-08 | Enhypen | Border: Carnival | 15 | 1 |
| 2021-05-15 | Itzy | Guess Who | 1 | 6 (R) 7 |
| 2021-05-15 | (G)I-dle | I Burn | 20 | 1 |
| 2021-05-22 | NCT Dream | Hot Sauce | 24 | 1 |
| 2021-07-17 | Loona | & | 24 | 1 |
| 2021-08-28 | Red Velvet | Queendom | 16 | 1 |
| 2021-09-04 | Stray Kids | Noeasy | 4 | 6 |
| 2021-12-11 | Stray Kids | Christmas EveL | 25 | 1 |
| 2022-01-22 | Eric Nam | There and Back Again | 10 | 1 (R) 2 |
| 2022-02-26 | Taeyeon | INVU | 20 | 1 |
| 2022-03-05 | STAYC | Young-Luv.com | 21 | 2 |
| 2022-04-02 | Red Velvet | Feel My Rhythm | 9 | 1 (R) 2 |
| 2022-04-02 | (G)I-dle | I Never Die | 16 | 1 |
| 2022-05-14 | Psy | Psy 9th | 2 | 2 |
| 2022-06-04 | Got7 | Got7 | 11 | 1 |
| 2022-08-13 | NewJeans | New Jeans | 6 | 14 (R) 40 |
| 2022-08-20 | Girls' Generation | Forever 1 | 16 | 1 |
| 2022-10-22 | The Rose | Heal | 4 | 1 |
| 2022-10-29 | Le Sserafim | Antifragile | 19 | 1 |
| 2022-12-31 | P1Harmony | Harmony: Set In | 12 | 1 |
| 2023-03-11 | The Boyz | Be Awake | 7 | 1 |
| 2023-04-08 | Nmixx | Expérgo | 2 | 3 |
| 2023-04-22 | Ive | I've Ive | 8 | 4 (R) 5 |
| 2023-05-13 | Le Sserafim feat. Nile Rodgers | Unforgiven | 5 | 1 |
| 2023-05-27 | (G)I-dle | I Feel | 25 | 1 |
| 2023-09-02 | STAYC | Teenfresh | 14 | 1 |
| 2023-09-23 | BoyNextDoor | Why.. | 1 | 3 |
| 2023-09-23 | Eric Nam | House On a Hill | 22 | 1 |
| 2023-10-07 | Fifty Fifty | The Beginning | 6 | 18 |
| 2023-10-14 | Oneus | La Dolce Vita | 8 | 1 |
| 2023-10-21 | DPR Ian | Dear Insanity | 1 | 1 |
| 2023-10-28 | Ive | I've Mine | 16 | 1 (R) 2 |
| 2023-11-25 | Red Velvet | Chill Kill | 14 | 1 |
| 2024-02-03 | Nmixx | Fe3O4: Break | 1 | 3 |
| 2024-02-17 | TWS | Sparkling Blue | 8 | 3 |
| 2024-04-06 | Illit | Super Real Me | 4 | 5 |
| 2024-06-15 | ARTMS | DALL | 9 | 1 |
| 2024-06-22 | Peggy Gou | I Hear You | 15 | 1 |
| 2024-07-06 | Red Velvet | Cosmic | 25 | 1 |
| 2024-07-13 | TWS | Summer Beat! | 22 | 1 |
| 2024-08-17 | Red Velvet | Cosmic | 1 | 4 |
| 2024-08-17 | Riize | Riizing | 5 | 3 |
| 2024-09-07 | Nmixx | Fe3O4: Stick Out | 12 | 1 |
| 2024-10-12 | Jaehyun | J | 11 | 1 |
| 2024-08-19 | Woosung | 4444 | 8 | 1 |
| 2024-11-16 | Babymonster | Drip | 1 | 2 (R) 3 |
| 2024-11-16 | Kep1er | Tipi-tap | 2 | 2 |

=== Heatseekers Albums (East North Central) ===
- Chart discontinued after 2020-01-18
2013 – 2020

| Chart date | Artist | Song/Album title | Peak position | Weeks on chart |
|---|---|---|---|---|
| 2013-09-21 | G-Dragon | Coup d'Etat Pt. 1 | 8 | 1 |
| 2015-12-19 | BTS | The Most Beautiful Moment In Life, Part 2 | 1 | 1 (R) 2 |
| 2016-04-09 | Got7 | Flight Log: Departure | 8 | 1 |
| 2016-12-31 | Big Bang | Made | 2 | 1 |
| 2017-04-01 | Got7 | Flight Log: Arrival | 8 | 1 |
| 2017-06-24 | G-Dragon | Kwon Ji Yong | 2 | 1 |
| 2017-11-25 | Seventeen | Teen, Age | 9 | 1 |
| 2017-12-09 | Red Velvet | Perfect Velvet | 7 | 1 |
| 2018-02-17 | Seventeen | Director's Cut | 4 | 1 |
| 2018-03-03 | Agust D | Agust D | 8 | 2 |
| 2018-03-24 | Got7 | Eyes on You | 7 | 1 |
| 2018-06-09 | Shinee | The Story of Light | 8 | 1 |
| 2018-07-28 | Seventeen | You Make My Day | 9 | 1 |
| 2018-09-29 | Got7 | Present: You | 10 | 1 |
| 2018-12-15 | Red Velvet | RBB | 3 | 1 |
| 2019-01-26 | Ateez | Treasure EP.2: Zero to One | 9 | 1 |
| 2019-02-23 | Taemin | Want | 9 | 1 |
| 2019-03-16 | TXT | The Dream Chapter: Star | 3 | 1 |
| 2019-05-04 | Twice | Fancy You | 9 | 1 |
| 2019-07-20 | Baekhyun | City Lights | 7 | 1 |
| 2019-11-02 | TXT | The Dream Chapter: Magic | 10 | 1 |
| 2019-11-16 | Got7 | Call My Name | 9 | 1 |
| 2020-01-04 | Red Velvet | The ReVe Festival: Finale | 2 | 2 |

=== Heatseekers Albums (Middle Atlantic) ===
- Chart discontinued after 2020-01-18
2009 – 2020

| Chart date | Artist | Song/Album title | Peak position | Weeks on chart |
|---|---|---|---|---|
| 2009-04-04 | BoA | BoA | 5 | 1 |
| 2012-09-29 | G-Dragon | One of a Kind | 6 | 1 |
| 2012-02-18 | Girls' Generation | The Boys | 2 | 1 |
| 2013-02-19 | Girls' Generation-TTS | Twinkle | 5 | 1 |
| 2013-09-21 | G-Dragon | Coup d'Etat Pt. 1 | 7 | 1 |
| 2014-11-08 | Epik High | Shoebox | 9 | 1 |
| 2015-09-05 | Girls' Generation | Lion Heart | 8 | 1 |
| 2015-10-24 | Taeyeon | I | 10 | 1 |
| 2015-12-19 | BTS | The Most Beautiful Moment In Life, Part 2 | 3 | 1 (R) 2 |
| 2016-03-12 | Taemin | Press It | 8 | 1 |
| 2016-04-09 | Got7 | Flight Log: Departure | 3 | 1 |
| 2016-05-21 | BTS | The Most Beautiful Moment In Life: Young Forever | 9 | 1 |
| 2016-05-28 | Tiffany Young | I Just Wanna Dance | 10 | 1 |
| 2016-10-01 | MOBB | The Mobb | 7 | 1 |
| 2016-12-24 | Seventeen | Going Seventeen | 5 | 1 |
| 2016-12-31 | BigBang | Made | 1 | 3 |
| 2017-01-28 | NCT 127 | Limitless | 4 | 1 |
| 2017-04-01 | Got7 | Flight Log: Arrival | 4 | 1 |
| 2017-06-24 | G-Dragon | Kwon Ji Yong | 1 | 2 |
| 2017-09-02 | Taeyang | White Night | 9 | 1 |
| 2017-10-28 | Got7 | 7 for 7 | 9 | 1 |
| 2017-11-25 | Seventeen | Teen, Age | 9 | 1 |
| 2017-12-09 | Red Velvet | Perfect Velvet | 7 | 1 |
| 2018-01-20 | Stray Kids | Mixtape | 9 | 1 |
| 2018-02-17 | Seventeen | Director's Cut | 5 | 1 |
| 2018-03-03 | Agust D | Agust D | 5 | 2 |
| 2018-03-24 | Got7 | Eyes on You | 4 | 1 |
| 2018-06-09 | Shinee | The Story of Light | 4 | 1 |
| 2018-08-18 | Red Velvet | Summer Magic | 6 | 1 |
| 2018-12-15 | Red Velvet | RBB | 1 | 1 |
| 2019-01-26 | Ateez | Treasure EP.2: Zero to One | 8 | 1 |
| 2019-02-23 | Taemin | Want | 9 | 1 |
| 2019-03-02 | Loona | X X | 10 | 1 |
| 2019-03-16 | TXT | The Dream Chapter: Star | 2 | 1 |
| 2019-04-20 | Monsta X | Take.2 We Are Here | 8 | 1 |
| 2019-05-04 | Twice | Fancy You | 4 | 1 |
| 2019-06-29 | Red Velvet | The ReVe Festival: Day 1 | 10 | 1 |
| 2019-07-20 | Baekhyun | City Lights | 4 | 3 |
| 2019-08-10 | NCT Dream | We Boom | 9 | 1 |
| 2019-08-31 | Red Velvet | The ReVe Festival: Day 2 | 8 | 1 |
| 2019-10-05 | Twice | Feel Special | 10 | 1 |
| 2019-11-02 | TXT | The Dream Chapter: Magic | 10 | 1 |
| 2020-01-04 | Red Velvet | The ReVe Festival: Finale | 1 | 2 |

=== Heatseekers Albums (Mountain) ===
- Chart discontinued after 2020-01-18
2012 – 2020

| Chart date | Artist | Song/Album title | Peak position | Weeks on chart |
|---|---|---|---|---|
| 2012-09-29 | G-Dragon | One of a Kind | 9 | 1 |
| 2015-12-19 | BTS | The Most Beautiful Moment In Life, Part 2 | 3 | 1 |
| 2016-02-20 | Winner | Exit E | 9 | 1 |
| 2016-04-09 | Got7 | Flight Log: Departure | 4 | 1 |
| 2016-05-14 | Seventeen | First Love & Letter | 9 | 1 |
| 2016-12-31 | Big Bang | Made | 5 | 1 |
| 2017-01-28 | NCT 127 | Limitless | 10 | 1 |
| 2017-04-01 | GOT7 | Flight Log: Arrival | 5 | 1 |
| 2017-04-08 | Monsta X | The Clan Pt. 2.5: The Final Chapter | 8 | 1 |
| 2017-06-24 | G-Dragon | Kwon Ji Yong | 4 | 2 |
| 2017-09-02 | Taeyang | White Night | 6 | 1 |
| 2017-10-28 | Got7 | 7 for 7 | 7 | 1 |
| 2018-01-20 | Stray Kids | Mixtape | 8 | 1 |
| 2018-02-17 | Seventeen | Director's Cut | 6 | 1 |
| 2018-03-03 | Agust D | Agust D | 4 | 2 |
| 2018-03-24 | Got7 | Eyes on You | 4 | 1 |
| 2018-04-07 | Monsta X | The Connect: Dejavu | 8 | 1 |
| 2018-06-09 | Shinee | The Story of Light | 5 | 1 |
| 2018-06-23 | Shinee | The Story of Light EP.2 | 6 | 1 |
| 2018-07-28 | Seventeen | You Make My Day | 10 | 1 |
| 2018-08-18 | Red Velvet | Summer Magic | 10 | 1 |
| 2018-12-15 | Red Velvet | RBB | 4 | 1 |
| 2019-01-26 | Ateez | Treasure EP.2: Zero to One | 8 | 1 |
| 2019-02-23 | Taemin | Want | 8 | 1 |
| 2019-03-16 | TXT | The Dream Chapter: Star | 2 | 1 |
| 2019-05-04 | Twice | Fancy You | 7 | 1 |
| 2019-06-29 | Red Velvet | The ReVe Festival: Day 1 | 9 | 1 |
| 2019-07-20 | Baekhyun | City Lights | 6 | 1 (R) 2 |
| 2019-11-02 | TXT | The Dream Chapter: Magic | 8 | 1 (R) 2 |
| 2020-01-04 | Red Velvet | The ReVe Festival: Finale | 3 | 2 |

=== Heatseekers Albums (Northeast) ===
- Chart discontinued after 2020-01-18
2009 – 2020

| Chart date | Artist | Song/Album title | Peak position | Weeks on chart |
|---|---|---|---|---|
| 2009-04-04 | BoA | BoA | 10 | 1 |
| 2012-09-29 | G-Dragon | One of a Kind | 6 | 1 |
| 2013-02-19 | Girls' Generation-TTS | Twinkle | 10 | 1 |
| 2013-09-21 | G-Dragon | Coup d'Etat Pt. 1 | 8 | 1 |
| 2015-09-05 | Girls' Generation | Lion Heart | 9 | 1 |
| 2015-10-24 | Taeyeon | I | 9 | 1 |
| 2015-12-19 | BTS | The Most Beautiful Moment In Life, Part 2 | 4 | 1 (R) 2 |
| 2016-04-09 | Got7 | Flight Log: Departure | 2 | 1 |
| 2016-12-31 | Big Bang | Made | 1 | 1 |
| 2017-01-28 | NCT 127 | Limitless | 7 | 1 |
| 2017-04-01 | Got7 | Flight Log: Arrival | 4 | 1 |
| 2017-06-24 | G-Dragon | Kwon Ji Yong | 5 | 1 |
| 2017-08-26 | Girls' Generation | Holiday Night | 8 | 1 |
| 2017-11-25 | Seventeen | Teen, Age | 7 | 1 |
| 2017-12-09 | Red Velvet | Perfect Velvet | 9 | 1 |
| 2018-01-20 | Stray Kids | Mixtape | 9 | 1 |
| 2018-02-17 | Seventeen | Director's Cut | 7 | 1 |
| 2018-03-03 | Agust D | Agust D | 6 | 2 |
| 2018-03-24 | Got7 | Eyes on You | 8 | 1 |
| 2018-06-09 | Shinee | The Story of Light | 2 | 1 |
| 2018-08-18 | Red Velvet | Summer Magic | 7 | 1 |
| 2018-12-15 | Red Velvet | RBB | 2 | 2 (R) 3 |
| 2018-12-29 | Monsta X | Are You There? | 10 | 1 |
| 2019-01-12 | Stray Kids | I am YOU | 9 | 1 |
| 2019-01-26 | Ateez | Treasure EP.2: Zero to One | 10 | 1 |
| 2019-03-16 | TXT | The Dream Chapter: Star | 4 | 1 |
| 2019-05-04 | Twice | Fancy You | 7 | 1 |
| 2019-06-29 | Red Velvet | The ReVe Festival: Day 1 | 10 | 1 |
| 2019-07-20 | Baekhyun | City Lights | 10 | 1 |
| 2019-08-31 | Red Velvet | The ReVe Festival: Day 2 | 10 | 1 |
| 2019-12-28 | TXT | The Dream Chapter: Magic | 4 | 3 |
| 2020-01-04 | Red Velvet | The ReVe Festival: Finale | 3 | 2 |

=== Heatseekers Albums (Pacific) ===
- Chart discontinued after 2020-01-18
2009 – 2020

| Chart date | Artist | Song/Album title | Peak position | Weeks on chart (# after Re-entry is total) |
|---|---|---|---|---|
| 2009-04-04 | BoA | BoA | 1 | 1 |
| 2012-09-29 | G-Dragon | One of a Kind | 4 | 2 |
| 2013-02-19 | Girls' Generation-TTS | Twinkle | 1 | 1 |
| 2013-09-21 | G-Dragon | Coup d'Etat Pt. 1 | 2 | 1 |
| 2013-09-21 | G-Dragon | Coup d'Etat Pt. 2 | 4 | 1 |
| 2014-11-08 | Epik High | Shoebox | 3 | 1 |
| 2015-09-05 | Girls' Generation | Lion Heart | 6 | 1 |
| 2015-10-24 | Taeyeon | I | 2 | 1 |
| 2015-11-14 | f(x) | 4 Walls | 10 | 1 |
| 2015-12-19 | BTS | The Most Beautiful Moment In Life, Part 2 | 1 | 1 (R) 3 |
| 2015-12-26 | Girls' Generation-TTS | Dear Santa: X-Mas Special | 7 | 1 |
| 2016-02-20 | Winner | Exit E | 3 | 1 |
| 2016-03-12 | Taemin | Press It | 7 | 1 |
| 2016-04-09 | Got7 | Flight Log: Departure | 3 | 1 |
| 2016-05-14 | Seventeen | First Love & Letter | 6 | 1 |
| 2016-05-21 | BTS | The Most Beautiful Moment In Life: Young Forever | 8 | 1 |
| 2016-05-28 | Tiffany Young | I Just Wanna Dance | 6 | 1 |
| 2016-06-04 | Jessica | With Love, J | 4 | 1 |
| 2016-07-16 | Taeyeon | Why | 8 | 1 |
| 2016-10-01 | MOBB | The Mobb | 6 | 1 |
| 2016-10-15 | Got7 | Flight Log: Turbulence | 3 | 1 |
| 2016-11-19 | Blackpink | Square Two | 7 | 1 |
| 2016-12-24 | Seventeen | Going Seventeen | 5 | 1 |
| 2016-12-31 | BigBang | Made | 1 | 5 |
| 2017-01-21 | AOA | Angel's Knock | 5 | 1 |
| 2017-01-28 | NCT 127 | Limitless | 1 | 1 |
| 2017-02-04 | Seohyun | Don't Say No | 6 | 1 |
| 2017-02-18 | Zion.T | OO | 10 | 1 |
| 2017-03-18 | Taeyeon | My Voice | 10 | 1 |
| 2017-04-01 | Got7 | Flight Log: Arrival | 3 | 1 |
| 2017-04-08 | Monsta X | The Clan Pt. 2.5: The Final Chapter | 8 | 1 |
| 2017-05-13 | IU | Palette | 6 | 1 |
| 2017-06-24 | G-Dragon | Kwon Ji Yong | 1 | 2 |
| 2017-08-19 | JJ Project | Verse 2 | 1 | 1 |
| 2017-08-26 | Girls' Generation | Holiday Night | 2 | 1 |
| 2017-09-02 | Taeyang | White Night | 4 | 2 |
| 2017-10-28 | Got7 | 7 for 7 | 6 | 1 |
| 2017-11-18 | Twice | Twicetagram | 8 | 1 |
| 2017-11-25 | Seventeen | Teen, Age | 6 | 1 |
| 2017-12-09 | Red Velvet | Perfect Velvet | 4 | 1 |
| 2018-02-10 | Red Velvet | The Perfect Red Velvet | 6 | 1 |
| 2018-02-17 | Seventeen | Director's Cut | 3 | 1 |
| 2018-03-03 | Agust D | Agust D | 5 | 2 |
| 2018-03-24 | Got7 | Eyes on You | 1 | 1 |
| 2018-03-24 | NCT 2018 | NCT 2018 Empathy | 10 | 1 |
| 2018-04-07 | Monsta X | The Connect: Dejavu | 5 | 1 |
| 2018-04-21 | Twice | What Is Love? | 8 | 1 |
| 2018-06-09 | Shinee | The Story of Light | 3 | 1 |
| 2018-06-23 | Shinee | The Story of Light EP.2 | 7 | 1 |
| 2018-07-28 | Seventeen | You Make My Day | 6 | 1 |
| 2018-08-04 | Seungri | The Great Seungri | 8 | 1 |
| 2018-08-11 | iKon | New Kids: Continue | 8 | 1 |
| 2018-08-18 | Red Velvet | Summer Magic | 1 | 1 |
| 2018-09-01 | Loona | ++ | 3 | 1 |
| 2018-09-15 | NCT Dream | We Go Up | 8 | 1 (R) 2 |
| 2018-09-29 | Got7 | Present: You | 5 | 1 |
| 2018-11-03 | Monsta X | Take.1 Are You There? | 10 | 1 |
| 2018-11-17 | Twice | Yes or Yes | 6 | 1 |
| 2018-12-15 | Red Velvet | RBB | 1 | 1 |
| 2019-02-02 | Seventeen | You Made My Dawn | 6 | 1 |
| 2019-02-23 | Taemin | Want | 8 | 1 |
| 2019-03-02 | Loona | X X | 7 | 1 (R) 2 |
| 2019-03-09 | Tiffany Young | Lips On Lips | 4 | 1 |
| 2019-03-16 | TXT | The Dream Chapter: Star | 2 | 2 |
| 2019-04-13 | Chen | April, and a Flower | 5 | 1 |
| 2019-05-04 | Twice | Fancy You | 3 | 1 |
| 2019-05-04 | Monsta X | Take.2 We Are Here | 5 | 1 |
| 2019-06-01 | Got7 | Spinning Top | 6 | 1 |
| 2019-06-22 | Ateez | Treasure EP.3: One to All | 9 | 1 |
| 2019-06-29 | Red Velvet | The ReVe Festival: Day 1 | 3 | 1 |
| 2019-07-20 | Baekhyun | City Lights | 3 | 3 (R) 4 |
| 2019-08-10 | NCT Dream | We Boom | 7 | 1 |
| 2019-08-31 | Red Velvet | The ReVe Festival: Day 2 | 3 | 1 (R) 2 |
| 2019-10-05 | Twice | Feel Special | 3 | 1 |
| 2019-10-19 | Ateez | Treasure EP.Fin: All to Action | 4 | 1 (R) 2 |
| 2019-11-02 | TXT | The Dream Chapter: Magic | 1 (Note: Peaked 2nd week, 2019-11-30 (1 week)) | 1 (R) 3 |
| 2019-11-09 | Taeyeon | Purpose | 9 | 1 |
| 2019-11-16 | Got7 | Call My Name | 6 | 1 |
| 2019-11-30 | Monsta X | Follow: Find You | 2 | 1 (R) 2 |
| 2019-12-14 | Stray Kids | "I Am You" | 1 | 1 (R) 3 |
| 2020-01-04 | Red Velvet | The ReVe Festival: Finale | 1 | 2 |

=== Heatseekers Albums (South Atlantic) ===
- Chart discontinued after 2020-01-18
2009 – 2020

| Chart date | Artist | Song/Album title | Peak position | Weeks on chart (# after Re-entry is total) |
|---|---|---|---|---|
| 2009-04-04 | BoA | BoA | 8 | 1 |
| 2012-09-29 | G-Dragon | One of a Kind | 4 | 1 |
| 2013-02-19 | Girls' Generation-TTS | Twinkle | 5 | 1 |
| 2013-09-21 | G-Dragon | Coup d'Etat Pt. 1 | 3 | 1 |
| 2013-09-21 | G-Dragon | Coup d'Etat Pt. 2 | 4 | 1 |
| 2015-10-24 | Taeyeon | I | 8 | 1 |
| 2015-12-19 | BTS | The Most Beautiful Moment In Life, Part 2 | 2 | 1 (R) 2 |
| 2016-02-20 | Winner | Exit E | 6 | 1 |
| 2016-03-12 | Taemin | Press It | 9 | 1 |
| 2016-04-09 | Got7 | Flight Log: Departure | 1 | 1 |
| 2016-05-14 | Seventeen | First Love & Letter | 6 | 1 |
| 2016-05-21 | BTS | The Most Beautiful Moment In Life: Young Forever | 10 | 1 |
| 2016-10-01 | MOBB | The Mobb | 8 | 1 |
| 2016-10-15 | Got7 | Flight Log: Turbulence | 7 | 1 |
| 2016-12-24 | Seventeen | Going Seventeen | 9 | 1 |
| 2016-12-31 | Big Bang | Made | 2 | 1 |
| 2017-01-28 | NCT 127 | Limitless | 5 | 1 |
| 2017-04-01 | Got7 | Flight Log: Arrival | 3 | 1 |
| 2017-06-24 | G-Dragon | Kwon Ji Yong | 2 | 2 |
| 2017-08-19 | JJ Project | Verse 2 | 10 | 1 |
| 2017-10-28 | Got7 | 7 for 7 | 10 | 1 |
| 2017-11-25 | Seventeen | Teen, Age | 7 | 1 |
| 2017-11-25 | Monsta X | The Code | 8 | 1 |
| 2017-12-09 | Red Velvet | Perfect Velvet | 4 | 1 |
| 2018-01-20 | Stray Kids | Mixtape | 9 | 1 |
| 2018-02-10 | Red Velvet | The Perfect Red Velvet | 7 | 1 |
| 2018-02-17 | Seventeen | Director's Cut | 4 | 2 |
| 2018-03-03 | Agust D | Agust D | 3 | 2 |
| 2018-03-24 | Got7 | Eyes on You | 5 | 1 |
| 2018-03-24 | NCT 2018 | NCT 2018 Empathy | 8 | 1 |
| 2018-04-07 | Monsta X | The Connect: Dejavu | 6 | 1 |
| 2018-06-09 | Shinee | The Story of Light | 3 | 1 |
| 2018-06-23 | Shinee | The Story of Light EP.2 | 7 | 1 |
| 2018-07-28 | Seventeen | You Make My Day | 8 | 1 |
| 2018-08-18 | Red Velvet | Summer Magic | 2 | 1 |
| 2018-09-01 | Loona | ++ | 4 | 1 |
| 2018-09-15 | NCT Dream | We Go Up | 9 | 1 |
| 2018-09-29 | Got7 | Present: You | 6 | 1 |
| 2018-11-03 | Monsta X | Take.1 Are You There? | 6 | 1 (R) 2 |
| 2018-12-15 | Red Velvet | RBB | 2 | 2 |
| 2019-01-12 | Stray Kids | I am YOU | 8 | 1 |
| 2019-01-26 | Ateez | Treasure EP.2: Zero to One | 6 | 1 |
| 2019-02-23 | Taemin | Want | 8 | 1 |
| 2019-03-02 | Loona | X X | 5 | 1 |
| 2019-03-16 | TXT | The Dream Chapter: Star | 1 | 1 |
| 2019-04-13 | Chen | April, and a Flower | 9 | 1 |
| 2019-04-20 | Monsta X | Take.2 We Are Here | 7 | 1 (R) 2 |
| 2019-05-04 | Twice | Fancy You | 6 | 1 |
| 2019-06-22 | Ateez | Treasure EP.3: One to All | 8 | 1 |
| 2019-06-29 | Red Velvet | The ReVe Festival: Day 1 | 5 | 1 |
| 2019-07-20 | Baekhyun | City Lights | 1 (Note: Peaked 3rd week, 2019-08-03 (1 week)) | 3 |
| 2019-08-10 | NCT Dream | We Boom | 10 | 1 |
| 2019-08-31 | Red Velvet | The ReVe Festival: Day 2 | 8 | 1 |
| 2019-10-19 | Ateez | Treasure EP.Fin: All to Action | 9 | 1 |
| 2019-11-02 | TXT | The Dream Chapter: Magic | 3 | 1 (R) 2 |
| 2019-11-09 | Monsta X | Follow: Find You | 9 | 1 |
| 2020-01-04 | Red Velvet | The ReVe Festival: Finale | 2 | 2 |

=== Heatseekers Albums (South Central) ===
- Chart discontinued after 2020-01-18
2012 – 2020

| Chart date | Artist | Song/Album title | Peak position | Weeks on chart (# after Re-entry is total) |
|---|---|---|---|---|
| 2012-09-29 | G-Dragon | One of a Kind | 9 | 1 |
| 2013-02-19 | Girls' Generation-TTS | Twinkle | 6 | 1 |
| 2013-09-21 | G-Dragon | Coup d'Etat Pt. 1 | 8 | 1 |
| 2015-12-19 | BTS | The Most Beautiful Moment In Life, Part 2 | 2 | 1 (R) 2 |
| 2016-02-20 | Winner | Exit E | 8 | 1 |
| 2016-03-12 | Taemin | Press It | 10 | 1 |
| 2016-04-09 | Got7 | Flight Log: Departure | 3 | 1 |
| 2016-05-14 | Seventeen | First Love & Letter | 10 | 1 |
| 2016-05-21 | BTS | The Most Beautiful Moment In Life: Young Forever | 8 | 1 |
| 2016-10-01 | MOBB | The Mobb | 10 | 1 |
| 2016-10-15 | Got7 | Flight Log: Turbulence | 7 | 1 |
| 2016-12-31 | Big Bang | Made | 4 | 1 |
| 2017-01-28 | NCT 127 | Limitless | 9 | 1 |
| 2017-04-01 | Got7 | Flight Log: Arrival | 4 | 1 |
| 2017-06-24 | G-Dragon | Kwon Ji Yong | 2 | 2 |
| 2017-08-26 | Girls' Generation | Holiday Night | 9 | 1 |
| 2017-09-02 | Taeyang | White Night | 8 | 1 |
| 2017-10-28 | Got7 | 7 for 7 | 7 | 1 |
| 2017-11-18 | Twice | Twicetagram | 10 | 1 |
| 2017-12-09 | Red Velvet | Perfect Velvet | 7 | 1 |
| 2018-01-20 | Stray Kids | Mixtape | 9 | 1 |
| 2018-02-17 | Seventeen | Director's Cut | 4 | 1 |
| 2018-03-03 | Agust D | Agust D | 4 | 2 |
| 2018-03-24 | Got7 | Eyes on You | 5 | 1 |
| 2018-04-07 | Monsta X | The Connect: Dejavu | 10 | 1 |
| 2018-06-09 | Shinee | The Story of Light | 1 | 1 |
| 2018-06-23 | Shinee | The Story of Light EP.2 | 8 | 1 |
| 2018-07-28 | Seventeen | You Make My Day | 10 | 1 |
| 2018-08-04 | Seungri | The Great Seungri | 8 | 1 |
| 2018-08-11 | iKon | New Kids: Continue | 10 | 1 |
| 2018-08-18 | Red Velvet | Summer Magic | 6 | 1 |
| 2018-09-01 | Loona | ++ | 9 | 1 |
| 2018-09-29 | Got7 | Present: You | 6 | 1 |
| 2018-11-03 | Monsta X | Take.1 Are You There? | 7 | 1 |
| 2018-12-15 | Red Velvet | RBB | 1 | 1 (R) 2 |
| 2019-01-26 | Ateez | Treasure EP.2: Zero to One | 10 | 1 |
| 2019-02-23 | Taemin | Want | 8 | 1 |
| 2019-03-02 | Loona | X X | 6 | 1 |
| 2019-03-16 | TXT | The Dream Chapter: Star | 1 | 2 |
| 2019-04-06 | Stray Kids | Clé 1: Miroh | 10 | 1 |
| 2019-04-20 | Monsta X | Take.2 We Are Here | 7 | 1 |
| 2019-05-04 | Twice | Fancy You | 10 | 1 |
| 2019-06-01 | Got7 | Spinning Top | 7 | 1 |
| 2019-06-22 | Ateez | Treasure EP.3: One to All | 9 | 1 |
| 2019-07-20 | Baekhyun | City Lights | 1 | 1 (R) 2 |
| 2019-08-03 | Exo-SC | What a Life | 10 | 1 |
| 2019-10-19 | Ateez | Treasure EP.Fin: All to Action | 10 | 1 |
| 2019-11-02 | TXT | The Dream Chapter: Magic | 4 | 1 |
| 2020-01-04 | Red Velvet | The ReVe Festival: Finale | 2 | 2 |

=== Heatseekers Albums (West North Central) ===
- Chart discontinued after 2020-01-18
2013–2020

| Chart date | Artist | Song/Album title | Peak position | Weeks on chart (# after Re-entry is total) |
|---|---|---|---|---|
| 2013-09-21 | G-Dragon | Coup d'Etat Pt. 1 | 10 | 1 |
| 2015-12-19 | BTS | The Most Beautiful Moment In Life, Part 2 | 2 | 1 (R) 2 |
| 2016-04-09 | Got7 | Flight Log: Departure | 5 | 1 |
| 2016-10-15 | Got7 | Flight Log: Turbulence | 10 | 1 |
| 2016-12-31 | Big Bang | Made | 1 | 1 |
| 2017-06-24 | G-Dragon | Kwon Ji Yong | 3 | 2 |
| 2017-12-09 | Red Velvet | Perfect Velvet | 8 | 1 |
| 2018-01-20 | Stray Kids | Mixtape | 10 | 1 |
| 2018-02-17 | Seventeen | Director's Cut | 8 | 1 |
| 2018-03-03 | Agust D | Agust D | 5 | 2 |
| 2018-03-24 | Got7 | Eyes on You | 7 | 1 |
| 2018-04-07 | Monsta X | The Connect: Dejavu | 7 | 1 |
| 2018-06-09 | Shinee | The Story of Light | 3 | 1 |
| 2018-07-28 | Seventeen | You Make My Day | 6 | 1 |
| 2018-08-18 | Red Velvet | Summer Magic | 7 | 1 |
| 2018-12-15 | Red Velvet | RBB | 2 | 1 |
| 2019-01-26 | Ateez | Treasure EP.2: Zero to One | 7 | 1 |
| 20–03–02 | Monsta X | Take.2 We Are Here | 10 | 1 |
| 2019-03-16 | TXT | The Dream Chapter: Star | 4 | 1 |
| 2019-05-04 | Twice | Fancy You | 8 | 1 |
| 2019-06-22 | Ateez | Treasure EP.3: One to All | 7 | 1 |
| 2019-06-29 | Red Velvet | The ReVe Festival: Day 1 | 8 | 1 |
| 2019-07-20 | Baekhyun | City Lights | 5 | 1 |
| 2019-08-31 | Red Velvet | The ReVe Festival: Day 2 | 10 | 1 |
| 2019-10-19 | Ateez | Treasure EP.Fin: All to Action | 10 | 1 |
| 2019-11-02 | TXT | The Dream Chapter: Magic | 8 | 1 |
| 2020-01-04 | Red Velvet | The ReVe Festival: Finale | 2 | 2 |

=== Independent albums (Complete) ===
| Chart date | Artist | Song/Album title | Peak position | Weeks on chart (# after Re-entry is total) |
|---|---|---|---|---|
| 2009-04-04 | BoA | BoA | 16 | 1 |
| 2011-03-12 | Big Bang | Tonight | 29 | 1 |
| 2012-03-17 | BigBang | Alive | 22 | 1 |
| 2012-03-31 | Shinee | Sherlock | 48 | 1 |
| 2012-05-12 | Girls' Generation-TTS | Twinkle | 21 | 1 |
| 2012-09-29 | G-Dragon | One of a Kind | 38 | 1 |
| 2013-01-19 | Girls' Generation | I Got a Boy | 23 | 1 |
| 2013-03-09 | Shinee | Dream Girl – The Misconceptions of You | 34 | 1 |
| 2013-05-11 | Shinee | Why So Serious? – The Misconceptions of Me | 47 | 1 |
| 2013-09-21 | G-Dragon | Coup d'Etat Pt.1 | 39 | 1 |
| 2013-09-21 | G-Dragon | Coup d'Etat Pt.2 | 48 | 1 |
| 2014-03-15 | 2NE1 | Crush | 9 | 1 |
| 2014-03-15 | Girls' Generation | Mr.Mr. | 23 | 1 |
| 2014-05-24 | Exo-K | Overdose | 23 | 1 |
| 2014-06-21 | Taeyang | Rise | 20 | 1 |
| 2014-10-04 | Girls' Generation-TTS | Holler | 41 | 1 |
| 2014-11-08 | Epik High | Shoebox | 44 | 1 |
| 2015-04-18 | Exo | Exodus | 15 | 1 |
| 2015-05-16 | BTS | The Most Beautiful Moment In Life, Part 1 | 20 | 1 |
| 2015-06-06 | Shinee | Odd | 27 | 1 |
| 2015-10-24 | Taeyeon | I | 38 | 1 |
| 2015-11-14 | f(x) | 4 Walls | 50 | 1 |
| 2015-12-19 | BTS | The Most Beautiful Moment In Life, Part 2 | 9 | 2 |
| 2016-02-20 | Winner | Exit E | 17 | 1 |
| 2016-03-12 | Taemin | Press It | 31 | 1 |
| 2016-04-09 | Got7 | Flight Log: Departure | 21 | 1 |
| 2016-05-14 | Seventeen | First Love & Letter | 42 | 1 |
| 2016-05-21 | BTS | The Most Beautiful Moment In Life: Young Forever | 42 | 1 |
| 2016-05-28 | Tiffany Young | I Just Wanna Dance | 49 | 1 |
| 2016-06-25 | Exo | Ex'Act | 49 | 1 |
| 2016-07-16 | Taeyeon | Why | 48 | 1 |
| 2016-10-01 | MOBB | The Mobb | 44 | 1 |
| 2016-10-15 | Got7 | Flight Log: Turbulence | 34 | 1 |
| 2016-10-29 | BTS | Wings | 9 | 2 (R) 3 |
| 2016-11-19 | Exo-CBX | Hey Mama! | 41 | 1 |
| 2016-12-31 | BigBang | Made | 12 | 1 |
| 2017-01-28 | NCT 127 | Limitless | 23 | 1 |
| 2017-03-04 | BTS | You Never Walk Alone | 19 | 1 |
| 2017-03-18 | Taeyeon | My Voice | 43 | 1 |
| 2017-04-01 | Got7 | Flight Log: Arrival | 16 | 1 |
| 2017-04-08 | Monsta X | The Clan Pt. 2.5: The Final Chapter | 31 | 1 |
| 2017-06-10 | Seventeen | Al1 | 26 | 1 |
| 2017-06-24 | G-Dragon | Kwon Ji Yong | 8 | 2 |
| 2017-07-01 | NCT 127 | Cherry Bomb | 41 | 1 |
| 2017-07-29 | Red Velvet | The Red Summer | 25 | 1 |
| 2017-08-05 | Exo | The War | 3 | 2 |
| 2017-08-05 | Kard | Hola Hola | 46 | 1 |
| 2017-08-19 | JJ Project | Verse 2 | 23 | 1 |
| 2017-08-26 | Girls' Generation | Holiday Night | 16 | 1 |
| 2017-09-02 | Taeyang | White Night | 12 | 2 |
| 2017-10-07 | BTS | Love Yourself: Her | 2 | 47 (R) 72 |
| 2017-10-28 | Got7 | 7 for 7 | 20 | 1 |
| 2017-11-25 | Seventeen | Teen, Age | 41 | 1 |
| 2017-12-09 | Red Velvet | Perfect Velvet | 39 | 1 |
| 2018-01-06 | Exo | Universe | 26 | 1 |
| 2018-01-20 | Stray Kids | Mixtape | 22 | 1 |
| 2018-02-03 | Jonghyun | Poet ｜ Artist | 7 | 1 |
| 2018-02-10 | Red Velvet | The Perfect Red Velvet | 32 | 1 |
| 2018-02-10 | iKon | Return | 39 | 1 |
| 2018-02-17 | Seventeen | Director's Cut | 19 | 1 |
| 2018-03-03 | Agust D | Agust D | 17 | 1 |
| 2018-03-10 | J-Hope | Hope World | 2 | 3 |
| 2018-03-24 | Got7 | Eyes on You | 13 | 1 |
| 2018-03-24 | NCT 2018 | NCT 2018 Empathy | 29 | 2 |
| 2018-04-07 | Monsta X | The Connect: Dejavu | 20 | 1 |
| 2018-04-07 | Stray Kids | I Am Not | 46 | 1 |
| 2018-04-21 | Exo-CBX | Blooming Days | 33 | 1 |
| 2018-04-21 | Twice | What Is Love? | 35 | 1 |
| 2018-04-28 | Super Junior | Replay | 43 | 1 |
| 2018-06-02 | BTS | Love Yourself: Tear | 1 (Total 2 weeks) (Note: Entered at No. 1 for 2 weeks) | 77 (R) 83 |
| 2018-06-09 | Shinee | The Story of Light | 19 | 1 |
| 2018-06-23 | Shinee | The Story of Light EP.2 | 29 | 1 |
| 2018-06-30 | Blackpink | Square Up | 4 | 4 |
| 2018-07-07 | Shinee | The Story of Light EP.3 | 34 | 1 |
| 2018-07-28 | Seventeen | You Make My Day | 27 | 1 |
| 2018-08-04 | Seungri | The Great Seungri | 35 | 1 |
| 2018-08-11 | iKon | New Kids: Continue | 33 | 1 |
| 2018-08-18 | Red Velvet | Summer Magic | 10 | 1 |
| 2018-08-18 | Stray Kids | I Am Who | 36 | 1 |
| 2018-09-01 | Loona | ++ | 20 | 1 |
| 2018-09-08 | BTS | Love Yourself: Answer | 1 (Total 2 weeks) | 119 (R) 126 |
| 2018-09-15 | NCT Dream | We Go Up | 35 | 1 |
| 2018-09-29 | Got7 | Present: You | 28 | 1 |
| 2018-10-27 | NCT 127 | Regular-Irregular | 5 | 2 (R) 4 |
| 2018-11-03 | RM | mono. | 2 | 2 (R) 3 |
| 2018-11-03 | Monsta X | Take.1 Are You There? | 24 | 1 |
| 2018-11-17 | Exo | Don't Mess Up My Tempo | 1 | 14 |
| 2018-12-15 | Red Velvet | RBB | 8 | 2 (R) 3 |
| 2019-01-12 | Exo | Love Shot | 45 | 1 |
| 2019-01-12 | NCT 127 | Regulate | 46 | 1 |
| 2019-02-02 | Seventeen | You Made My Dawn | 30 | 1 |
| 2019-02-09 | CLC | No.1 | 49 | 1 |
| 2019-02-23 | Taemin | Want | 7 | 1 |
| 2019-03-02 | Loona | X X | 22 | 1 |
| 2019-03-09 | Tiffany Young | Lips On Lips | 30 | 1 |
| 2019-03-16 | TXT | The Dream Chapter: Star | 1 | 1 |
| 2019-03-23 | Pinkfong | Pinkfong Presents: The Best of Baby Shark | 5 | 18 (R) 51 |
| 2019-04-06 | Stray Kids | Clé 1: Miroh | 30 | 1 |
| 2019-04-13 | Chen | April, and a Flower | 33 | 1 |
| 2019-04-27 | BTS | Map of the Soul: Persona | 1 (Total 6 weeks) (Note: Entered at No. 1 for 2 weeks, returned to No. 1 on 2019-06-15 (2 weeks), 2019-07-13 (2 weeks)) | 46 |
| 2019-05-04 | Twice | Fancy You | 16 | 1 |
| 2019-06-01 | Got7 | Spinning Top | 33 | 1 |
| 2019-06-08 | NCT 127 | We Are Superhuman | 1 | 7 (R) 10 |
| 2019-06-29 | Red Velvet | The ReVe Festival: Day 1 | 22 | 1 |
| 2019-06-29 | Stray Kids | Clé 2: Yellow Wood | 50 | 1 |
| 2019-07-13 | BTS | BTS World: Original Soundtrack | 1 (Total 2 weeks) (Note: Peaked at No. 1 on 5th week, 2019-08-17 (2 weeks)) | 1 (R) 26 |
| 2019-07-20 | Baekhyun | City Lights | 9 | 3 |
| 2019-08-03 | Exo-SC | What a Life | 32 | 1 |
| 2019-08-10 | NCT Dream | We Boom | 27 | 1 |
| 2019-08-31 | Red Velvet | The ReVe Festival: Day 2 | 28 | 1 |
| 2019-10-05 | Twice | Feel Special | 27 | 1 |
| 2019-11-09 | Taeyeon | Purpose | 41 | 1 |
| 2019-11-09 | Monsta X | Follow: Find You | 42 | 1 |
| 2019-11-16 | Got7 | Call My Name | 28 | 1 |
| 2019-12-07 | Exo | Obsession | 5 | 6 |
| 2020-01-04 | Red Velvet | The ReVe Festival: Finale | 8 | 4 |
| 2020-03-07 | BTS | Map of the Soul: 7 | 1 | 93 |
| 2020-03-21 | NCT 127 | Neo Zone | 2 | 21 |
| 2020-05-02 | Got7 | Dye | 45 | 1 |
| 2020-06-06 | Agust D | D-2 | 1 | 2 |
| 2020-07-04 | Stray Kids | Go Live | 29 | 2 |
| 2020-09-26 | Stray Kids | In Life | 50 | 1 |
| 2020-10-10 | SuperM | Super One | 1 | 1 (R) 4 |
| 2020-10-31 | NCT | NCT 2020 Resonance Pt. 1 | 1 | 13 (R) 15 |
| 2020-10-31 | BTS | Skool Luv Affair | 2 | 2 |
| 2020-10-31 | Loona | [12:00] | 23 | 2 |
| 2020-12-05 | BTS | Be | 1 (Total 3 weeks) (Note: Entered at No. 1 for 2 weeks, returned to No. 1 on 2021-03-06 (1 week)) | 44 |
| 2021-05-15 | Itzy | Guess Who | 25 | 1 |
| 2021-09-04 | Stray Kids | Noeasy | 38 | 1 |
| 2021-10-02 | NCT 127 | Sticker | 1 | 18 |
| 2021-10-09 | Itzy | Crazy in Love | 1 | 3 |
| 2021-10-23 | Aespa | Savage | 1 | 1 (R) 2 |
| 2021-12-25 | Monsta X | The Dreaming | 3 | 3 |
| 2021-01-01 | NCT | Universe | 2 | 6 |
| 2022-04-09 | NCT Dream | Glitch Mode | 7 | 1 |
| 2022-05-14 | Psy | Psy 9th | 36 | 1 |
| 2022-10-01 | NCT 127 | 2 Baddies | 2 | 5 (R) 9 |
| 2022-11-05 | (G)I-dle | I Love | 11 | 1 |
| 2023-03-18 | NCT 127 | Ay-Yo | 2 | 3 |
| 2023-04-08 | Nmixx | Expérgo | 16 | 1 |
| 2023-04-15 | Xikers | House of Tricky: Doorbell Ringing | 11 | 1 |
| 2023-06-03 | (G)I-dle | I Feel | 9 | 3 |
| 2023-06-24 | P1Harmony | Harmony: All In | 11 | 1 |
| 2023-09-02 | NCT Dream | ISTJ | 6 | 3 |
| 2023-10-07 | The Rose | Dual | 20 | 1 |
| 2023-10-14 | NCT | Golden Age | 12 | 2 |
| 2023-10-21 | NCT 127 | Fact Check | 2 | 2 (R) 5 |
| 2023-10-21 | DPR Ian | Dear Insanity | 26 | 1 |
| 2024-02-24 | P1Harmony | Killin' It | 8 | 2 |
| 2024-03-16 | (G)I-dle | 2 | 22 | 2 |
| 2024-03-23 | Xikers | House Of Tricky: Trial and Error | 15 | 1 |
| 2024-04-13 | Illit | Super Real Me | 14 | 1 (R) 3 |
| 2024-05-18 | NCT Dream | Dream()scape | 41 | 1 |
| 2024-06-20 | Aespa | Armageddon | 3 | 3 |
| 2024-08-03 | NCT 127 | Walk | 18 | 1 |
| 2024-08-17 | Red Velvet | Cosmic | 20 | 1 |
| 2024-09-21 | Xikers | House of Tricky: Watch Out | 36 | 1 |
| 2024-10-05 | P1Harmony | Sad Song | 1 | 2 |
| 2024-11-09 | Aespa | Whiplash | 9 | 2 |
| 2024-11-16 | Babymonster | Drip | 22 | 1 |
| 2024-11-23 | Kep1er | Tipi-tap | 21 | 1 |
| 2025-03-08 | G-Dragon | Übermensch | 27 | 1 |
| 2025-04-19 | Zerobaseone | Blue Paradise | 5 | 1 |
| 2025-04-19 | Xikers | House of Tricky: Spur | 33 | 1 |
| 2025-05-24 | P1Harmony | Duh! | 3 | 2 |
| 2025-06-07 | Baekhyun | Essence of Reverie | 19 | 1 |
| 2025-08-02 | Jackson Wang | "Magic Man 2" | 2 | 1 |
| 2025-09-20 | Zerobaseone | Never Say Never | 3 | 2 |
| 2025-09-20 | Monsta X | The X | 5 | 1 |
| 2025-10-11 | P1Harmony | Ex | 2 | 2 |
| 2025-10-25 | Babymonster | We Go Up | 41 | 1 |
| 2025-11-08 | BoyNextDoor | The Action | 5 | 1 |
| 2026-03-14 | Blackpink | Deadline | 3 | 5 |
| 2026-03-21 | Ive | Revive+ | 36 | 1 |
| 2026-03-28 | P1Harmony | Unique | 1 | 2 |
| 2026-04-18 | Monsta X | Unfold | 9 | 1 |
| 2026-05-02 | Plave | Caligo Pt.2 | 21 | 1 |
| 2026-07-11 | Zerobaseone | Ascend- | 47 | 1 |
| 2026-09-19 | Monsta X | The Phase | 14 | 1 |
| 2026-10-31 | Plave | Hyperdrive | 4 | 1 |
| 2026-11-14 | Ive | Looks Can Kill | 19 | 1 |
| 2026-11-21 | P1Harmony | Blow Up | 1 | 1 |

=== Indie Store Album Sales ===
- previously called Tastemakers

| Chart date | Artist | Song/Album title | Peak position | Weeks on chart |
|---|---|---|---|---|
| 2018-06-02 | BTS | Love Yourself: Tear | 12 | 3 (R) 11 |
| 2018-09-08 | BTS | Love Yourself: Answer | 3 | 2 (R) 5 |
| 2019-05-04 | BTS | Map of the Soul: Persona | 5 | 2 (R) 12 |
| 2019-08-17 | BTS | BTS World: Original Soundtrack | 18 | 1 |
| 2019-10-19 | SuperM | SuperM | 3 | 2 |
| 2020-01-25 | Red Velvet | The ReVe Festival: Finale | 3 | 2 (R) 3 |
| 2020-01-25 | TXT | The Dream Chapter: Magic | 14 | 2 |
| 2020-02-01 | Exo | Obsession | 16 | 1 |
| 2020-02-01 | Monsta X | Follow: Find You | 23 | 1 |
| 2020-02-29 | Monsta X | All About Luv | 3 | 2 |
| 2020-03-07 | BTS | Map of the Soul: 7 | 1 (Total 3 weeks) (Note: Entered at No. 1 for 2 weeks, returned to No. 1 on 2020-03-28 (1 week)) | 25 (R) 37 |
| 2020-03-21 | NCT 127 | Neo Zone | 1 (Total 3 weeks) (Note: Entered at No. 1 for 1 week, returned to No. 1 on 2020-04-04 (1 week), 2020-06-27 (1 week)) | 22 |
| 2020-08-22 | BTS | Map of the Soul: 7 - The Journey | 9 | 2 |
| 2020-10-10 | SuperM | Super One( | 4 | 4 |
| 2020-10-17 | Blackpink | The Album | 7 | 2 (R) 4 |
| 2020-10-31 | NCT | NCT 2020 Resonance Pt. 1 | 2 | 1 (R) 4 |
| 2020-10-31 | BTS | Skool Luv Affair | 6 | 1 |
| 2020-11-21 | TXT | Minisode1: Blue Hour | 9 | 2 (R) 3 |
| 2020-12-05 | BTS | Be | 1 (Total 3 weeks) (Note: Entered at No. 1 for 2 weeks, returned to No. 1 on 2021-03-06 (1 week)) | 3 (R) 10 |
| 2020-12-19 | Twice | Eyes Wide Open | 9 | 1 |
| 2021-05-15 | Itzy | Guess Who | 9 | 2 |
| 2021-05-15 | BTS | Love Yourself: Her | 18 | 1 (R) 6 |
| 2021-05-29 | Enhypen | Border: Carnival | 6 | 2 |
| 2021-06-19 | TXT | The Chaos Chapter: Freeze | 2 | 1 (R) 18 |
| 2021-07-03 | Twice | Taste of Love | 4 | 3 |
| 2021-10-02 | NCT 127 | Sticker | 4 | 2 (R) 6 |
| 2021-10-09 | Itzy | Crazy in Love | 1 | 3 |
| 2021-10-23 | Aespa | Savage | 4 | 1 |
| 2021-10-30 | Enhypen | Dimension: Dilemma | 6 | 2 (R) 3 |
| 2021-11-27 | Twice | Formula of Love: O+T=<3 | 7 | 2 (R) 4 |
| 2022-04-02 | Stray Kids | Oddinary | 2 | 4 (R) 5 |
| 2022-04-30 | NCT Dream | Glitch Mode | 15 | 1 |
| 2022-05-28 | TXT | Minisode 2: Thursday's Child | 3 | 3 |
| 2022-06-18 | Seventeen | Face the Sun | 13 | 1 |
| 2022-06-25 | BTS | Proof | 1 | 4 |
| 2022-06-25 | NCT Dream | Beatbox | 23 | 1 |
| 2022-07-09 | Nayeon | Im Nayeon | 4 | 3 |
| 2022-07-23 | Aespa | Girls | 5 | 1 (R) 3 |
| 2022-07-30 | Itzy | Checkmate | 11 | 1 |
| 2022-08-13 | Enhypen | Manifesto: Day 1 | 14 | 3 |
| 2022-09-10 | Twice | Between 1&2 | 2 | 3 (R) 5 |
| 2022-09-24 | Jackson Wang | "Magic Man" | 2 | 1 |
| 2022-10-01 | Blackpink | Born Pink | 1 (Total 2 weeks) | 3 (R) 4 |
| 2022-10-01 | NCT 127 | 2 Baddies | 11 | 1 |
| 2022-10-22 | Stray Kids | Maxident | 3 | 3 (R) 4 |
| 2022-11-19 | Seventeen | Attacca | 21 | 1 |
| 2022-12-17 | Itzy | Cheshire | 12 | 1 |
| 2023-02-11 | TXT | The Name Chapter: Temptation | 3 | 5 |
| 2023-03-18 | NCT 127 | Ay-Yo | 9 | 1 |
| 2023-03-25 | Twice | Ready to Be | 1 | 3 |
| 2023-04-15 | Jimin | Face | 24 | 1 |
| 2023-05-13 | Seventeen | FML | 2 | 5 (R) 6 |
| 2023-05-13 | Agust D | D-Day | 17 | 1 |
| 2023-05-20 | Le Sserafim | Unforgiven | 8 | 1 |
| 2023-06-03 | (G)I-dle | I Feel | 23 | 2 |
| 2023-06-17 | Stray Kids | 5-Star | 3 | 8 (R) 9 |
| 2023-06-17 | Enhypen | Dark Blood | 6 | 4 (R) 5 |
| 2023-07-15 | Aespa | My World | 2 | 7 |
| 2023-08-05 | NewJeans | Get Up | 1 (Note: Peaked third week, 2023-08-19 (1 week)) | 9 (R) 10 |
| 2023-09-02 | NCT Dream | ISTJ | 6 | 3 |
| 2023-10-21 | NCT 127 | Fact Check | 1 | 2 |
| 2023-10-21 | (G)I-dle | Heat | 9 | 1 |
| 2023-10-21 | NCT | Golden Age | 23 | 1 |
| 2023-10-28 | TXT | The Name Chapter: Freefall | 1 | 3 |
| 2023-11-11 | Seventeen | Seventeenth Heaven | 10 | 2 |
| 2023-11-18 | Jungkook | Golden | 4 | 1 |
| 2023-11-25 | Stray Kids | Rock-Star | 2 | 2 (R) 6 |
| 2023-11-25 | Aespa | Drama | 12 | 1 |
| 2023-12-02 | Enhypen | Orange Blood | 6 | 1 |
| 2023-12-16 | Ateez | The World EP.Fin: Will | 2 | 5 (R) 7 |
| 2024-02-17 | (G)I-dle | 2 | 2 | 1 |
| 2024-03-09 | Le Sserafim | Easy | 3 | 2 |
| 2024-03-09 | Twice | With You-th | 4 | 2 |
| 2024-04-20 | TXT | Minisode 3: Tomorrow | 6 | 2 |
| 2024-06-15 | Ateez | Golden Hour: Part.1 | 15 | 1 |
| 2024-06-22 | RM | Right Place, Wrong Person | 19 | 1 |
| 2024-07-27 | Enhypen | Romance: Untold | 13 | 1 |
| 2024-08-03 | Stray Kids | Ate | 5 | 2 |
| 2024-11-02 | Seventeen | Spill the Feels | 18 | 1 |
| 2024-11-23 | TXT | The Star Chapter: Sanctuary | 9 | 1 |
| 2025-08-02 | Jackson Wang | "Magic Man 2" | 2 | 1 |
| 2025-09-06 | Stray Kids | Karma | 5 | 1 (R) 2 |
| 2025-09-20 | Le Sserafim | Easy-Crazy-Hot | 22 | 1 |
| 2025-10-11 | KPop Demon Hunters | KPop Demon Hunters (soundtrack) | 1 (Note: Peaked at No. 1 on 2026-05-02 (1 week)) | 5 (R) 12 |
| 2025-12-06 | Stray Kids | Do It | 10 | 1 |
| 2026-01-31 | Enhypen | The Sin: Vanish | 25 | 1 |
| 2026-04-04 | BTS | Arirang | 1 | 2 |
| 2026-05-23 | Cortis | GreenGreen | 9 | 1 (R) 3 |
| 2026-08-22* | Stray Kids | This & That | 2 | 3 |
| 2026-11-14 | Illit | Break Even | 7 | 1 |

=== Internet Albums ===
- Chart discontinued after 2020-01-18
2009 – 2020

| Chart date | Artist | Song/Album title | Peak position | Weeks on chart |
|---|---|---|---|---|
| 2009-04-04 | BoA | BoA | 127 | 1 |
| 2017-10-21 | BTS | Love Yourself: Her | 1 (Note: Peaked 2nd week, 2015-10-28 (1 week)) | 2 |
| 2018-06-02 | BTS | Love Yourself: Tear | 1 | 3 |
| 2018-09-08 | BTS | Love Yourself: Answer | 1 | 2 |
| 2018-10-27 | NCT 127 | Regular-Irregular | 13 | 2 |
| 2018-11-17 | Exo | Don't Mess Up My Tempo | 4 | 1 |
| 2019-04-20 | Monsta X | Take.2 We Are Here | 24 | 1 |
| 2019-04-27 | BTS | Map of the Soul: Persona | 1 | 2 |
| 2019-06-08 | NCT 127 | We Are Superhuman | 1 | 2 |
| 2019-08-03 | Baekhyun | City Lights | 24 | 1 |
| 2019-08-17 | BTS | BTS World: Original Soundtrack | 1 | 1 |
| 2019-10-19 | SuperM | SuperM | 1 | 8 (R) 10 |
| 2019-12-14 | Exo | Obsession | 11 | 2 |
| 2020-01-11 | Red Velvet | The ReVe Festival: Finale | 8 | 2 |

=== Rap Album Sales ===
- Chart discontinued after 2020-01-18
2017 – 2020

| Chart date | Artist | Song/Album title | Peak position | Weeks on chart |
|---|---|---|---|---|
| 2017-06-24 | G-Dragon | Kwon Ji Yong | 3 | 2 |
| 2017-11-11 | Epik High | We’ve Done Something Wonderful | 24 | 1 |
| 2018-03-03 | Agust D | Agust D | 10 | 1 |
| 2018-03-10 | J-Hope | Hope World | 4 | 2 |

=== Soundtrack Album Sales ===
- Chart discontinued after 2020-01-18
2019 – 2020

| Chart date | Artist | Song/Album title | Peak position | Weeks on chart |
|---|---|---|---|---|
| 2019-07-13 | BTS | BTS World: Original Soundtrack | 2 | 1 (R) 26 |

=== Soundtracks (Complete) ===
| Chart date | Artist | Song/Album title | Peak position | Weeks on chart |
|---|---|---|---|---|
| 2019-07-13 | BTS | BTS World: Original Soundtrack | 2 | 16 (R) 17 |
| 2025-07-05 | KPop Demon Hunters | KPop Demon Hunters (soundtrack) | 1 (Total 68 weeks) | 73 |

=== Top Album Sales ===
- Chart reduced from 100 to 50 on 2023-10-28.

| Chart date | Artist | Song/Album title | Peak position | Weeks on chart |
|---|---|---|---|---|
| 2014-03-15 | 2NE1 | Crush | 61 | 1 |
| 2015-04-18 | Exo | Exodus | 70 | 1 |
| 2016-10-29 | BTS | Wings | 20 | 1 |
| 2017-04-01 | Got7 | Flight Log: Arrival | 76 | 1 |
| 2017-06-24 | G-Dragon | Kwon Ji Yong | 47 | 2 |
| 2017-08-05 | Exo | The War | 34 | 1 |
| 2017-10-07 | BTS | Love Yourself: Her | 2 | 4 (R) 117 |
| 2017-10-28 | Got7 | 7 for 7 | 88 | 1 |
| 2018-02-03 | Jonghyun | Poet ｜ Artist | 44 | 1 |
| 2018-03-03 | Agust D | Agust D | 74 | 1 |
| 2018-03-10 | J-Hope | Hope World | 16 | 2 |
| 2018-03-24 | Got7 | Eyes on You | 76 | 1 |
| 2018-04-14 | BTS | Face Yourself | 41 | 1 |
| 2018-06-02 | BTS | Love Yourself: Tear | 1 | 24 (R) 118 |
| 2018-06-09 | Shinee | The Story of Light | 85 | 1 |
| 2018-06-30 | Blackpink | Square Up | 14 | 1 |
| 2018-08-18 | Red Velvet | Summer Magic | 91 | 1 |
| 2018-09-08 | BTS | Love Yourself: Answer | 1 | 46 (R) 108 |
| 2018-10-27 | NCT 127 | Regular-Irregular | 23 | 2 |
| 2018-11-03 | RM | mono. | 5 | 1 |
| 2018-11-17 | Exo | Don't Mess Up My Tempo | 6 | 2 |
| 2019-03-16 | TXT | The Dream Chapter: Star | 26 | 1 |
| 2019-03-23 | Pinkfong | Pinkfong Presents: The Best of Baby Shark | 26 | 6 |
| 2019-04-20 | Blackpink | Kill This Love | 10 | 1 |
| 2019-04-27 | BTS | Map of the Soul: Persona | 1 (Total 2 weeks) | 42 (R) 137 |
| 2019-06-08 | NCT 127 | We Are Superhuman | 1 | 3 |
| 2019-07-13 | BTS | BTS World: Original Soundtrack | 4 | 1 (R) 16 |
| 2019-08-03 | Baekhyun | City Lights | 71 | 1 |
| 2019-10-19 | SuperM | SuperM | 1 (Total 2 weeks) | 24 (R) 38 |
| 2019-11-02 | TXT | The Dream Chapter: Magic | 64 | 1 |
| 2019-12-14 | Exo | Obsession | 32 | 2 (R) 3 |
| 2020-01-11 | Red Velvet | The ReVe Festival: Finale | 40 | 4 |
| 2020-01-18 | Ateez | Treasure Epilogue: Action to Answer | 76 | 1 |
| 2020-02-01 | Monsta X | Follow: Find You | 61 | 1 |
| 2020-02-15 | Loona | # | 54 | 1 |
| 2020-02-29 | Monsta X | All About Luv | 3 | 6 (R) 9 |
| 2020-03-07 | BTS | Map of the Soul: 7 | 1 | 90 (R) 119 |
| 2020-03-21 | NCT 127 | Neo Zone | 1 (Total 2 weeks) (Note: Entered at No. 1 for 1 week, returned to No. 1 on 2020-06-27 (1 week)) | 38 (R) 42 |
| 2020-05-02 | Got7 | Dye | 32 | 1 |
| 2020-05-30 | TXT | The Dream Chapter: Eternity | 22 | 1 (R) 5 |
| 2020-06-06 | Agust D | D-2 | 2 | 1 |
| 2020-06-06 | Monsta X | Fantasia X | 14 | 1 (R) 2 |
| 2020-06-06 | Baekhyun | Delight | 53 | 1 |
| 2020-06-13 | Twice | More & More | 22 | 1 |
| 2020-07-04 | Stray Kids | Go Live | 26 | 3 |
| 2020-07-18 | Red Velvet - Irene & Seulgi | "Monster" | 46 | 1 |
| 2020-07-25 | BTS | Map of the Soul: 7 - The Journey | 3 | 1 (R) 8 |
| 2020-08-08 | Ateez | Zero: Fever Part.1 | 90 | 1 |
| 2020-09-19 | Wonho | Love Synonym Pt.1: Right for Me | 81 | 1 |
| 2020-10-10 | SuperM | Super One | 1 | 24 |
| 2020-10-17 | Blackpink | The Album | 1 (Total 2 weeks) | 36 (R) 51 |
| 2020-10-31 | NCT | NCT 2020 Resonance Pt. 1 | 2 | 36 (R) 38 |
| 2020-10-31 | BTS | Skool Luv Affair | 4 | 10 (R) 17 |
| 2020-10-31 | Loona | [12:00] | 14 | 2 |
| 2020-11-21 | TXT | Minisode1: Blue Hour | 1 | 5 |
| 2020-12-05 | BTS | Be | 1 (Total 3 weeks) (Note: Entered at No. 1 for 2 weeks, returned to No. 1 on 2021-03-06 (1 week)) | 48 (R) 57 |
| 2020-12-19 | Twice | Eyes Wide Open | 12 | 7 |
| 2021-02-06 | Got7 | Breath of Love: Last Piece | 28 | 1 |
| 2021-02-27 | TXT | Still Dreaming | 10 | 5 |
| 2021-03-06 | Shinee | Don't Call Me | 87 | 1 |
| 2021-05-15 | Itzy | Guess Who | 23 | 2 (R) 3 |
| 2021-05-15 | (G)I-dle | I Burn | 54 | 1 |
| 2021-05-29 | Enhypen | Border: Carnival | 4 | 3 |
| 2021-06-19 | TXT | The Chaos Chapter: Freeze | 1 | 23 (R) 33 |
| 2021-06-19 | Exo | Don't Fight the Feeling | 96 | 1 |
| 2021-06-26 | Twice | Taste of Love | 1 | 5 |
| 2021-07-03 | Seventeen | Your Choice | 1 | 10 (R) 17 |
| 2021-08-21 | BTS | BTS, the Best | 5 | 6 |
| 2021-09-25 | Ateez | Zero: Fever Part.3 | 6 | 1 |
| 2021-10-02 | NCT 127 | Sticker | 1 | 31 (R) 32 |
| 2021-10-09 | Itzy | Crazy in Love | 1 | 4 (R) 7 |
| 2021-10-23 | Aespa | Savage | 2 | 1 (R) 2 |
| 2021-10-30 | Enhypen | Dimension: Dilemma | 4 | 7 (R) 8 |
| 2021-11-06 | Seventeen | Attacca | 1 | 5 (R) 20 |
| 2021-11-27 | Twice | Formula of Love: O+T=<3 | 2 | 10 |
| 2021-12-18 | TXT | Chaotic Wonderland | 24 | 2 |
| 2021-12-25 | Monsta X | The Dreaming | 3 | 6 (R) 7 |
| 2021-12-25 | Ateez | Zero: Fever Epilogue | 11 | 1 |
| 2021-01-01 | NCT | Universe | 4 | 14 |
| 2022-01-29 | Enhypen | Dimension: Answer | 2 | 6 |
| 2022-04-02 | Stray Kids | Oddinary | 1 | 9 (R) 13 |
| 2022-04-09 | NCT Dream | Glitch Mode | 5 | 1 (R) 4 |
| 2022-05-28 | TXT | Minisode 2: Thursday's Child | 1 | 18 |
| 2022-06-04 | Got7 | Got7 | 67 | 1 |
| 2022-06-18 | Seventeen | Face the Sun | 1 | 18 |
| 2022-06-18 | Eric Nam | There and Back Again | 22 | 1 |
| 2022-06-18 | NCT Dream | Beatbox | 61 | 2 |
| 2022-06-25 | BTS | Proof | 1 (Total 2 weeks) | 10 (R) 33 |
| 2022-07-09 | Nayeon | Im Nayeon | 1 | 11 (R) 20 |
| 2022-07-23 | Aespa | Girls | 1 | 8 |
| 2022-07-30 | Itzy | Checkmate | 2 | 14 (R) 16 |
| 2022-07-30 | J-Hope | Jack in the Box | 2 | 1 (R) 11 |
| 2022-08-06 | Seventeen | Sector 17 | 1 | 1 (R) 10 |
| 2022-08-13 | Ateez | The World EP.1: Movement | 2 | 5 (R) 6 |
| 2022-08-13 | Enhypen | Manifesto: Day 1 | 1 (Note: Peaked at No. 1 on 2022-98-27 for 1 week) | 33 |
| 2022-09-10 | Twice | Between 1&2 | 1 | 18 (R) 32 |
| 2022-09-24 | Jackson Wang | "Magic Man" | 3 | 3 |
| 2022-10-01 | Blackpink | Born Pink | 1 | 19 (R) 22 |
| 2022-10-01 | NCT 127 | 2 Baddies | 2 | 26 |
| 2022-10-08 | Mark Tuan | The Other Side | 82 | 1 |
| 2022-10-22 | Stray Kids | Maxident | 1 | 22 (R) 35 |
| 2022-10-22 | The Rose | Heal | 19 | 1 |
| 2022-11-05 | Le Sserafim | Antifragile | 3 | 6 |
| 2022-11-05 | (G)I-dle | I Love | 9 | 3 |
| 2022-12-17 | Itzy | Cheshire | 4 | 10 (R) 11 |
| 2022-12-17 | RM | Indigo | 2 | 1 (R) 17 |
| 2022-12-17 | Enhypen | Sadame | 20 | 2 |
| 2023-01-14 | Ateez | Spin Off: From the Witness | 2 | 6 (R) 9 |
| 2023-02-11 | TXT | The Name Chapter: Temptation | 1 (Total 2 weeks) | 32 |
| 2023-03-11 | The Boyz | Be Awake | 11 | 1 |
| 2023-03-18 | NCT 127 | Ay-Yo | 2 | 7 (R) 12 |
| 2023-03-25 | Twice | Ready to Be | 1 | 28 (R) 29 |
| 2023-04-08 | Jimin | Face | 1 | 18 (R) 19 |
| 2023-04-08 | Nmixx | Expérgo | 13 | 2 |
| 2023-04-15 | Xikers | House of Tricky: Doorbell Ringing | 7 | 3 |
| 2023-05-06 | Agust D | D-Day | 1 | 18 (R) 19 |
| 2023-05-13 | Seventeen | FML | 1 | 22 |
| 2023-05-20 | Le Sserafim | Unforgiven | 2 | 18 |
| 2023-06-03 | (G)I-dle | I Feel | 7 | 9 |
| 2023-06-17 | Stray Kids | 5-Star | 1 | 23 (R) 28 |
| 2023-06-17 | Enhypen | Dark Blood | 2 | 21 |
| 2023-06-24 | P1Harmony | Harmony: All In | 8 | 4 |
| 2023-07-01 | Ateez | The World EP.2: Outlaw | 1 | 9 |
| 2023-07-15 | Aespa | My World | 1 | 12 |
| 2023-07-15 | NewJeans | New Jeans | 32 | 10 |
| 2023-08-05 | NewJeans | Get Up | 1 | 28 (R) 33 |
| 2023-08-12 | Treasure | Reboot | 61 | 1 |
| 2023-08-19 | Itzy | Kill My Doubt | 3 | 8 |
| 2023-08-19 | TXT | Sweet | 7 | 5 |
| 2023-08-19 | Xikers | House of Tricky: How to Play | 19 | 2 |
| 2023-09-02 | Jihyo | Zone | 4 | 8 (R) 9 |
| 2023-09-02 | NCT Dream | ISTJ | 6 | 8 |
| 2023-09-02 | STAYC | Teenfresh | 40 | 1 |
| 2023-09-23 | V | Layover | 2 | 12 (R) 15 |
| 2023-09-23 | BoyNextDoor | Why.. | 10 | 5 |
| 2023-09-23 | Eric Nam | House On a Hill | 22 | 1 |
| 2023-10-07 | The Rose | Dual | 5 | 1 |
| 2023-10-14 | NCT | Golden Age | 3 | 4 |
| 2023-10-14 | Seventeen | Always Yours | 18 | 2 |
| 2023-10-14 | Oneus | La Dolce Vita | 31 | 1 |
| 2023-10-21 | NCT 127 | Fact Check | 1 | 3 (R) 7 |
| 2023-10-21 | (G)I-dle | Heat | 2 | 4 |
| 2023-10-21 | DPR Ian | Dear Insanity | 14 | 1 |
| 2023-10-28 | TXT | The Name Chapter: Freefall | 1 | 16 |
| 2023-11-11 | Seventeen | Seventeenth Heaven | 2 | 18 |
| 2023-11-18 | Jungkook | Golden | 1 | 22 (R) 23 |
| 2023-11-25 | Stray Kids | Rock-Star | 1 | 24 (R) 26 |
| 2023-11-25 | Aespa | Drama | 7 | 3 |
| 2023-12-02 | Enhypen | Orange Blood | 2 | 30 |
| 2023-12-16 | Ateez | The World EP.Fin: Will | 1 | 12 (R) 13 |
| 2023-12-30 | BTS | O!RUL8,2? | 41 | 1 |
| 2024-02-03 | Nmixx | Fe3O4: Break | 6 | 3 |
| 2024-02-03 | BTS | Dark & Wild | 27 | 1 |
| 2024-02-17 | TWS | Sparkling Blue | 16 | 3 |
| 2024-02-24 | P1Harmony | Killin' It | 2 | 5 |
| 2024-02-24 | Itzy | Born to Be | 5 | 3 |
| 2024-03-09 | Twice | With You-th | 1 (Total 2 weeks) | 16 |
| 2024-03-09 | Le Sserafim | Easy | 2 | 13 |
| 2024-03-16 | (G)I-dle | 2 | 4 | 5 |
| 2024-03-23 | Xikers | House Of Tricky: Trial and Error | 3 | 2 |
| 2024-04-13 | J-Hope | Hope on the Street Vol. 1 | 2 | 6 (R) 8 |
| 2024-04-20 | TXT | Minisode 3: Tomorrow | 1 | 20 (R) 21 |
| 2024-05-04 | BoyNextDoor | How? | 7 | 6 |
| 2024-05-11 | Illit | Super Real Me | 9 | 2 |
| 2024-05-18 | Seventeen | 17 Is Right Here | 3 | 10 |
| 2024-05-18 | NCT Dream | Dream()scape | 6 | 2 |
| 2024-06-08 | RM | Right Place, Wrong Person | 2 | 5 (R) 6 |
| 2024-06-15 | Ateez | Golden Hour: Part.1 | 1 | 12 |
| 2024-06-15 | ARTMS | DALL | 30 | 1 |
| 2024-06-29 | Nayeon | Na | 1 | 6 |
| 2024-07-13 | TWS | Summer Beat! | 49 | 1 |
| 2024-06-20 | Aespa | Armageddon | 2 | 7 (R) 8 |
| 2024-07-27 | Enhypen | Romance: Untold | 1 | 39 (R) 42 |
| 2024-08-03 | Stray Kids | Ate | 1 (Total 2 weeks) | 21 |
| 2024-08-03 | Jimin | Muse | 2 | 5 (R) 6 |
| 2024-08-03 | NCT 127 | Walk | 8 | 2 (R) 4 |
| 2024-08-17 | Red Velvet | Cosmic | 6 | 2 |
| 2024-08-17 | Riize | Riizing | 11 | 2 |
| 2024-08-24 | (G)I-dle | I Sway | 13 | 1 |
| 2024-09-07 | Nmixx | Fe3O4: Stick Out | 15 | 1 |
| 2024-09-14 | Le Sserafim | Crazy | 1 | 8 |
| 2024-09-21 | Xikers | House of Tricky: Watch Out | 10 | 1 |
| 2024-09-28 | BoyNextDoor | 19.99 | 4 | 5 |
| 2024-10-05 | P1Harmony | Sad Song | 3 | 4 |
| 2024-10-12 | Jaehyun | J | 18 | 1 |
| 2024-08-19 | Woosung | 4444 | 16 | 1 |
| 2024-11-02 | Seventeen | Spill the Feels | 1 | 7 (R) 9 |
| 2024-11-02 | Vanner | Burn | 32 | 1 |
| 2024-11-09 | Itzy | Gold | 8 | 2 |
| 2024-11-09 | Aespa | Whiplash | 9 | 3 |
| 2024-11-09 | 82Major | X-82 | 45 | 1 |
| 2024-11-16 | Babymonster | Drip | 12 | 1 |
| 2024-11-16 | Kep1er | Tipi-tap | 7 | 2 |
| 2024-11-23 | TXT | The Star Chapter: Sanctuary | 1 | 4 (R) 6 |
| 2024-11-23 | Illit | I'll Like You | 6 | 3 |
| 2024-11-30 | Ateez | Golden Hour: Part.2 | 1 | 5 (R) 8 |
| 2024-11-30 | Jin | Happy | 3 | 3 |
| 2024-11-30 | NCT Dream | Dreamscape | 26 | 1 |
| 2024-12-21 | Twice | Strategy | 2 | 13 |
| 2024-12-21 | Rosé | Rosie | 3 | 7 (R) 8 |
| 2024-12-28 | Stray Kids | Hop | 1 (Total 3 weeks) (Note: Entered at No. 1 for three weeks) | 32 (R) 42 |
| 2025-03-08 | G-Dragon | Übermensch | 10 | 1 (R) 3 |
| 2025-03-15 | Lisa | Alter Ego | 1 | 4 |
| 2025-03-22 | Jennie | Ruby | 2 | 5 (R) 6 |
| 2025-03-29 | Le Sserafim | Hot | 1 | 4 (R) 6 |
| 2025-03-29 | Jisoo | Amortage | 11 | 2 |
| 2025-03-29 | Yeji | Air | 17 | 1 |
| 2025-04-05 | The Boyz | Unexpected | 13 | 1 |
| 2025-04-05 | Nmixx | Fe3O4: Forward | 16 | 1 |
| 2025-04-19 | Zerobaseone | Blue Paradise | 3 | 7 |
| 2025-04-19 | Xikers | House of Tricky: Spur | 8 | 1 |
| 2025-05-17 | TWS | Try with Us | 47 | 1 |
| 2025-05-24 | P1Harmony | Duh! | 3 | 5 |
| 2025-05-31 | Jin | Echo | 2 | 4 |
| 2025-05-31 | BoyNextDoor | No Genre | 3 | 8 |
| 2025-05-31 | Meovv | My Eyes Open VVide | 10 | 1 |
| 2025-06-07 | Baekhyun | Essence of Reverie | 4 | 1 |
| 2025-06-07 | I-dle | We Are | 35 | 1 |
| 2025-06-14 | Seventeen | Happy Burstday | 1 | 7 |
| 2025-06-14 | The Rose | Wrld | 43 | 1 |
| 2025-06-21 | Enhypen | Desire: Unleash | 1 | 19 (R) 28 |
| 2025-06-28 | Ateez | Golden Hour: Part.3 | 1 | 9 |
| 2025-06-28 | Itzy | Girls Will Be Girls (EP) | 10 | 1 |
| 2025-07-05 | KPop Demon Hunters | KPop Demon Hunters (soundtrack) | 3 | 50 (R) 65 |
| 2025-07-12 | Illit | Bomb | 10 | 7 (R) 10 |
| 2025-07-26 | Twice | This Is For | 3 | 17 (R) 20 |
| 2025-07-26 | Riize | Odyssey | 9 | 1 |
| 2025-08-02 | BTS | Permission to Dance on Stage – Live | 2 | 5 |
| 2025-08-02 | Jackson Wang | "Magic Man 2" | 4 | 2 |
| 2025-08-09 | TXT | The Star Chapter: Together | 1 | 16 |
| 2025-09-06 | Stray Kids | Karma | 1 | 27 (R) 37 |
| 2025-09-20 | Aespa | Rich Man | 4 | 2 |
| 2025-09-20 | Zerobaseone | Never Say Never | 5 | 6 |
| 2025-09-20 | Monsta X | The X | 6 | 2 |
| 2025-09-20 | Le Sserafim | Easy-Crazy-Hot | 25 | 1 |
| 2025-09-27 | Cortis | Color Outside the Lines | 3 | 7 (R) 30 |
| 2025-09-27 | Chaeyoung | Lil Fantasy Vol. 1 | 6 | 2 |
| 2025-10-04 | Ive | Ive Secret | 16 | 1 |
| 2025-10-11 | P1Harmony | Ex | 2 | 4 |
| 2025-10-25 | Twice | Ten: The Story Goes On | 2 | 7 |
| 2025-10-25 | S.Coups X Mingyu | Hype Vibes | 5 | 2 |
| 2025-10-25 | Babymonster | We Go Up | 13 | 1 |
| 2025-11-01 | Nmixx | Blue Valentine | 7 | 2 |
| 2025-11-08 | BoyNextDoor | The Action | 7 | 3 (R) 4 |
| 2025-11-15 | Ateez | Ashes to Light | 11 | 1 |
| 2025-11-15 | Xikers | House of Tricky: Wrecking the House | 16 | 1 |
| 2025-11-22 | Yeonjun | No Labels: Part 01 | 1 | 4 (R) 5 |
| 2025-11-29 | Itzy | Tunnel Vision | 14 | 1 |
| 2025-12-06 | Stray Kids | Do It | 1 (Total 2 weeks) | 21 (R) 28 |
| 2026-01-31 | Enhypen | The Sin: Vanish | 1 | 19 |
| 2026-01-31 | DK X Seungkwan | Serenade | 6 | 1 |
| 2026-02-21 | Ateez | Golden Hour: Part.4 | 1 | 8 |
| 2026-03-14 | Blackpink | Deadline | 2 | 7 |
| 2026-03-21 | Ive | Revive+ | 11 | 2 |
| 2026-03-28 | P1Harmony | Unique | 2 | 4 |
| 2026-04-04 | BTS | Arirang | 1 (Total 3 weeks) | 34 |
| 2026-04-18 | Monsta X | Unfold | 2 | 2 |
| 2026-05-02 | TXT | 7th Year: A Moment of Stillness in the Thorns | 1 | 10 |
| 2026-05-02 | Plave | Caligo Pt.2 | 7 | 1 |
| 2026-05-16 | Illit | Mamihlapinatapai | 3 | 10 (R) 13 |
| 2026-05-16 | TWS | No Tragedy | 49 | 1 |
| 2026-05-23 | Cortis | GreenGreen | 1 (Total 2 weeks) | 26 |
| 2026-05-30 | Nmixx | Heavy Serenade | 8 | 2 |
| 2026-06-06 | Le Sserafim | Pureflow Pt. 1 | 1 | 11 |
| 2026-06-06 | Xikers | Route Zero: The Ora | 11 | 1 |
| 2026-06-06 | Itzy | Motto | 16 | 1 (R) 2 |
| 2026-06-13 | Aespa | Lemonade | 2 | 7 |
| 2026-06-20 | Meovv | Bite Now | 26 | 1 |
| 2026-06-27 | BoyNextDoor | Home | 2 | 4 (R) 10 |
| 2026-06-27 | Taeyong | WYLD | 25 | 1 |
| 2026-07-11 | Ateez | Golden Hour: Part.5 | 1 | 9 |
| 2026-07-11 | Zerobaseone | Ascend- | 10 | 2 |
| 2026-07-25 | Yeonjun | No Labels: Part 02 | 4 | 6 |
| 2026-07-25 | I-dle | We Made | 46 | 1 |
| 2026-08-15 | Riize | II (Riize EP) | 39 | 1 |
| 2026-08-22 | Stray Kids | This & That | 1 (Total 2 weeks) (Note: Entered at number one for 1 week, re-entered 2026-09-26 (1 week)) | 14 |
| 2026-09-05 | Enhypen | The Sin: Bliss | 1 | 12 |
| 2026-09-12 | NCT 127 | Blingy | 11 | 1 |
| 2026-09-19 | Monsta X | The Phase | 7 | 2 |
| 2026-09-26 | Tuide | Tune & Play | 8 | 2 |
| 2026-10-03 | Evan | Death of Me | 7 | 2 |
| 2026-10-10 | &Team | Mark on Me | 3 | 2 |
| 2026-10-31 | Plave | Hyperdrive | 1 | 1 |
| 2026-10-31 | Twice | This Is For World Tour Finale in Seoul, Live | 6 | 1 |
| 2026-10-31 | Eric Nam | Confessions of a Lonely Heart | 16 | 1 |
| 2026-11-07 | Lisa | Press Play | 6 | 2 |
| 2026-11-07 | Nmixx | Strange Muse | 11 | 1 |
| 2026-11-07 | Jeonghan & Joshua | Dreamscape | 12 | 1 |
| 2026-11-14 | Illit | Break Even | 1 | 2 |
| 2026-11-14 | Ive | Looks Can Kill | 6 | 1 |
| 2026-11-14 | Jennie | Fallen Angel | 17 | 1 |
| 2026-11-21 | P1Harmony | Blow Up | 1 | 1 |
| 2026-11-21 | Xikers | Route Zero: The Calling | 17 | 1 |

=== Top Current Album Sales ===
- Chart started 2009-12-05; reduced from 100 to 50 on 2023-10-28, discontinued on 2026-03-07.
2009 – 2026

| Chart date | Artist | Song/Album title | Peak position | Weeks on chart |
|---|---|---|---|---|
| 2011-03-12 | Big Bang | Tonight | 192 | 1 |
| 2012-03-17 | BigBang | Alive | 114 | 1 |
| 2012-05-12 | Girls' Generation-TTS | Twinkle | 112 | 1 |
| 2012-09-29 | G-Dragon | One of a Kind | 141 | 1 |
| 2013-01-19 | Girls' Generation | I Got a Boy | 164 | 1 |
| 2013-03-09 | Shinee | Dream Girl – The Misconceptions of You | 175 | 1 |
| 2013-09-21 | G-Dragon | Coup d'Etat Pt.1 | 153 | 1 |
| 2013-09-21 | G-Dragon | Coup d'Etat Pt.2 | 179 | 1 |
| 2014-03-15 | Girls' Generation | Mr.Mr. | 97 | 1 |
| 2014-05-24 | Exo-K | Overdose | 109 | 1 |
| 2014-06-21 | Taeyang | Rise | 95 | 1 |
| 2014-08-30 | Winner | 2014 S/S | 197 | 1 |
| 2014-10-04 | Girls' Generation-TTS | Holler | 157 | 1 |
| 2014-11-08 | Epik High | Shoebox | 173 | 1 |
| 2015-04-18 | Exo | Exodus | 68 | 1 |
| 2015-12-19 | BTS | The Most Beautiful Moment In Life, Part 2 | 98 | 1 |
| 2016-10-29 | BTS | Wings | 20 | 1 |
| 2017-03-04 | BTS | You Never Walk Alone | 97 | 1 |
| 2017-04-01 | Got7 | Flight Log: Arrival | 63 | 1 |
| 2017-06-24 | G-Dragon | Kwon Ji Yong | 40 | 2 |
| 2017-08-05 | Exo | The War | 28 | 1 |
| 2017-08-26 | Girls' Generation | Holiday Night | 89 | 1 |
| 2017-09-02 | Taeyang | White Night | 79 | 1 |
| 2017-10-07 | BTS | Love Yourself: Her | 5 | 5 (R) 61 |
| 2017-10-28 | Got7 | 7 for 7 | 76 | 1 |
| 2018-02-03 | Jonghyun | Poet ｜ Artist | 38 | 1 |
| 2018-02-17 | Seventeen | Director's Cut | 79 | 1 |
| 2018-03-03 | Agust D | Agust D | 60 | 1 |
| 2018-03-10 | J-Hope | Hope World | 16 | 2 |
| 2018-03-24 | Got7 | Eyes on You | 67 | 1 |
| 2018-04-07 | Monsta X | The Connect: Dejavu | 99 | 1 |
| 2018-04-14 | BTS | Face Yourself | 38 | 1 |
| 2018-06-02 | BTS | Love Yourself: Tear | 1 | 77 |
| 2018-06-09 | Shinee | The Story of Light | 69 | 1 |
| 2018-06-30 | Blackpink | Square Up | 14 | 1 |
| 2018-07-28 | Seventeen | You Make My Day | 100 | 1 |
| 2018-08-18 | Red Velvet | Summer Magic | 64 | 1 |
| 2018-09-08 | BTS | Love Yourself: Answer | 1 | 75 (R) 76 |
| 2018-09-29 | Got7 | Present: You | 84 | 1 |
| 2018-10-27 | NCT 127 | Regular-Irregular | 23 | 2 |
| 2018-11-03 | RM | mono. | 5 | 2 |
| 2018-11-17 | Exo | Don't Mess Up My Tempo | 6 | 4 (R) 6 |
| 2018-12-15 | Red Velvet | RBB | 62 | 1 |
| 2019-02-02 | Seventeen | You Made My Dawn | 96 | 1 |
| 2019-02-23 | Taemin | Want | 90 | 1 |
| 2019-03-02 | Loona | X X | 83 | 1 |
| 2019-03-16 | TXT | The Dream Chapter: Star | 23 | 1 |
| 2019-03-23 | Pinkfong | Pinkfong Presents: The Best of Baby Shark | 23 | 7 (R) 18 |
| 2019-04-20 | Blackpink | "Kill This Love" | 10 | 3 |
| 2019-04-20 | Monsta X | Take.2 We Are Here | 93 | 1 |
| 2019-04-27 | BTS | Map of the Soul: Persona | 1 (Total 2 weeks) | 77 |
| 2019-05-04 | Twice | Fancy You | 78 | 1 |
| 2019-06-08 | NCT 127 | We Are Superhuman | 1 | 4 |
| 2019-07-13 | BTS | BTS World: Original Soundtrack | 4 | 1 (R) 47 |
| 2019-07-20 | Baekhyun | City Lights | 53 | 3 |
| 2019-10-05 | Twice | Feel Special | 84 | 1 |
| 2019-10-19 | SuperM | SuperM | 1 (Total 2 weeks) | 50 |
| 2019-11-02 | TXT | The Dream Chapter: Magic | 53 | 1 (R) 2 |
| 2019-11-16 | Got7 | Call My Name | 84 | 1 |
| 2019-12-07 | Exo | Obsession | 21 | 9 |
| 2020-01-11 | Red Velvet | The ReVe Festival: Finale | 27 | 4 (R) 6 |
| 2020-01-18 | Ateez | Treasure Epilogue: Action to Answer | 44 | 1 |
| 2020-02-01 | Monsta X | Follow: Find You | 41 | 1 |
| 2020-02-15 | Loona | # | 44 | 1 |
| 2020-02-29 | Monsta X | All About Luv | 3 | 6 (R) 29 |
| 2020-03-07 | BTS | Map of the Soul: 7 | 1 | 77 |
| 2020-03-21 | NCT 127 | Neo Zone | 1 (Total 2 weeks) (Note: Entered at No. 1 for 1 week, returned to No. 1 on 2020-06-27 (1 week)) | 54 (R) 58 |
| 2020-04-11 | Suho | Self-Portrait | 90 | 1 (R) 2 |
| 2020-04-18 | (G)I-dle | I Trust | 81 | 1 |
| 2020-05-02 | Got7 | Dye | 27 | 1 |
| 2020-05-09 | NCT Dream | Reload | 91 | 1 |
| 2020-05-30 | TXT | The Dream Chapter: Eternity | 18 | 1 (R) 10 |
| 2020-06-06 | Agust D | D-2 | 2 | 2 |
| 2020-06-06 | Monsta X | Fantasia X | 12 | 1 (R) 3 |
| 2020-06-06 | Baekhyun | Delight | 35 | 1 |
| 2020-06-13 | Twice | More & More | 17 | 1 |
| 2020-07-04 | Stray Kids | Go Live | 22 | 6 (R) 7 |
| 2020-07-11 | Hwasa | María | 81 | 1 |
| 2020-07-18 | Red Velvet - Irene & Seulgi | "Monster" | 31 | 1 |
| 2020-07-25 | BTS | Map of the Soul: 7 - The Journey | 3 | 1 (R) 12 |
| 2020-08-08 | Ateez | Zero: Fever Part.1 | 52 | 1 |
| 2020-09-19 | Wonho | Love Synonym Pt.1: Right for Me | 51 | 1 |
| 2020-09-19 | Taemin | Never Gonna Dance Again : Act 1 | 80 | 1 |
| 2020-09-26 | Stray Kids | In Life | 100 | 1 |
| 2020-10-10 | SuperM | Super One | 1 | 37 (R) 44 |
| 2020-10-17 | Blackpink | The Album | 1 (Total 2 weeks) | 56 (R) 68 |
| 2020-10-24 | NCT | NCT 2020 Resonance Pt. 1 | 2 | 40 (R) 46 |
| 2020-10-31 | Loona | [12:00] | 13 | 2 |
| 2020-11-07 | Twice | Eyes Wide Open | 11 | 1 (R) 11 |
| 2020-11-14 | Monsta X | Fatal Love | 93 | 1 |
| 2020-11-21 | TXT | Minisode1: Blue Hour | 1 | 11 (R) 13 |
| 2020-12-05 | BTS | Be | 1 (Total 3 weeks) | 74 (R) 76 |
| 2020-12-12 | Got7 | Breath of Love: Last Piece | 18 | 1 (R) 6 |
| 2021-01-02 | Enhypen | Border: Day One | 77 | 2 |
| 2021-02-27 | TXT | Still Dreaming | 10 | 8 |
| 2021-02-27 | Chungha | Querencia | 59 | 1 |
| 2021-03-06 | Shinee | Don't Call Me | 48 | 1 |
| 2021-03-06 | I.M | Duality | 85 | 1 |
| 2021-03-13 | Ateez | Zero: Fever Part.2 | 57 | 4 (R) 5 |
| 2021-04-10 | Baekhyun | Bambi | 93 | 1 |
| 2021-05-15 | Itzy | Guess Who | 20 | 6 (R) 14 |
| 2021-05-15 | (G)I-dle | I Burn | 33 | 3 (R) 4 |
| 2021-05-29 | Enhypen | Border: Carnival | 4 | 4 (R) 5 |
| 2021-05-29 | Taemin | Advice | 88 | 1 |
| 2021-06-12 | TXT | The Chaos Chapter: Freeze | 1 (Note: Peaked 2nd week, 2021-06-19 (1 week)) | 45 (R) 47 |
| 2021-06-19 | Exo | Don't Fight the Feeling | 55 | 1 |
| 2021-06-26 | Twice | Taste of Love | 1 | 6 |
| 2021-07-03 | Seventeen | Your Choice | 1 | 19 (R) 23 |
| 2021-07-17 | Loona | & | 59 | 1 |
| 2021-08-07 | D.O. | Empathy | 74 | 1 |
| 2021-08-21 | BTS | BTS, the Best | 4 | 8 (R) 13 |
| 2021-08-28 | Red Velvet | Queendom | 78 | 1 |
| 2021-09-04 | Stray Kids | Noeasy | 69 | 1 |
| 2021-09-25 | Ateez | Zero: Fever Part.3 | 4 | 1 |
| 2021-10-02 | NCT 127 | Sticker | 1 | 31 (R) 43 |
| 2021-10-09 | Itzy | Crazy in Love | 1 | 18 (R) 24 |
| 2021-10-23 | Aespa | Savage | 2 | 1 (R) 4 |
| 2021-10-30 | Enhypen | Dimension: Dilemma | 3 | 16 |
| 2021-11-06 | Seventeen | Attacca | 1 | 26 (R) 50 |
| 2021-11-06 | CL | Alpha | 83 | 1 |
| 2021-11-27 | Twice | Formula of Love: O+T=<3 | 2 | 11 |
| 2021-12-18 | TXT | Chaotic Wonderland | 19 | 8 |
| 2021-12-25 | Monsta X | The Dreaming | 3 | 8 (R) 9 |
| 2021-12-25 | Ateez | Zero: Fever Epilogue | 7 | 1 |
| 2021-01-01 | NCT | Universe | 4 | 16 |
| 2022-01-22 | Eric Nam | There and Back Again | 16 | 1 (R) 2 |
| 2022-01-29 | Enhypen | Dimension: Answer | 2 | 9 |
| 2022-04-02 | Stray Kids | Oddinary | 1 | 22 (R) 26 |
| 2022-04-02 | (G)I-dle | I Never Die | 91 | 1 |
| 2022-04-02 | Red Velvet | "Feel My Rhythm" | 88 | 1 (R) 2 |
| 2022-04-09 | NCT Dream | Glitch Mode | 5 | 1 (R) 5 |
| 2022-05-14 | Dreamcatcher | Apocalypse: Save Us | 52 | 1 |
| 2022-05-21 | TXT | Minisode 2: Thursday's Child | 1 (Note: Peaked 2nd week, 2022-05-28 (1 week)) | 20 |
| 2022-06-04 | Got7 | Got7 | 38 | 1 |
| 2022-06-11 | Seventeen | Face the Sun | 1 (Note: Peaked 2nd week, 2022-06-18 (1 week)) | 21 (R) 26 |
| 2022-06-18 | NCT Dream | Beatbox | 35 | 6 |
| 2022-06-25 | BTS | Proof | 1 (Total 2 weeks) | 44 (R) 46 |
| 2022-07-09 | Nayeon | Im Nayeon | 1 | 12 (R) 26 |
| 2022-07-23 | Aespa | Girls | 1 | 9 (R) 12 |
| 2022-07-30 | Itzy | Checkmate | 2 | 21 (R) 30 |
| 2022-07-30 | J-Hope | Jack in the Box | 2 | 1 (R) 12 |
| 2022-08-06 | Seventeen | Sector 17 | 1 | 1 (R) 11 |
| 2022-08-13 | Ateez | The World EP.1: Movement | 2 | 7 (R) 8 |
| 2022-08-13 | Enhypen | Manifesto: Day 1 | 1 (Note: Peaked at No. 1 on 2022-08-27 for 1 week) | 38 |
| 2022-08-20 | Girls' Generation | Forever 1 | 88 | 1 |
| 2022-09-10 | Twice | Between 1&2 | 1 | 34 (R) 46 |
| 2022-09-24 | Jackson Wang | "Magic Man" | 3 | 3 (R) 5 |
| 2022-10-01 | Blackpink | Born Pink | 1 | 27 (R) 35 |
| 2022-10-01 | NCT 127 | 2 Baddies | 2 | 31 |
| 2022-10-08 | Mark Tuan | The Other Side | 51 | 1 |
| 2022-10-22 | Stray Kids | Maxident | 1 | 48 (R) 57 |
| 2022-10-22 | The Rose | Heal | 17 | 1 (R) 2 |
| 2022-11-05 | Le Sserafim | Antifragile | 3 | 7 |
| 2022-11-05 | (G)I-dle | I Love | 7 | 6 (R) 7 |
| 2022-12-17 | Itzy | Cheshire | 4 | 16 |
| 2022-12-17 | RM | Indigo | 2 | 1 (R) 26 |
| 2022-12-17 | Enhypen | Sadame | 13 | 8 |
| 2022-12-31 | P1Harmony | Harmony: Set In | 54 | 1 |
| 2023-01-14 | Ateez | Spin Off: From the Witness | 2 | 13 (R) 16 |
| 2023-02-11 | TXT | The Name Chapter: Temptation | 1 (Total 2 weeks) | 35 |
| 2023-03-04 | TNX | Love Never Dies | 73 | 1 |
| 2023-03-11 | The Boyz | Be Awake | 11 | 1 |
| 2023-03-18 | NCT 127 | Ay-Yo | 2 | 20 (R) 21 |
| 2023-03-25 | Twice | Ready to Be | 1 | 29 (R) 31 |
| 2023-04-08 | Jimin | Face | 1 | 24 (R) 26 |
| 2023-04-08 | Nmixx | Expérgo | 12 | 4 |
| 2023-04-15 | Xikers | House of Tricky: Doorbell Ringing | 7 | 3 (R) 5 |
| 2023-04-22 | Ive | I've Ive | 57 | 1 |
| 2023-05-06 | Agust D | D-Day | 1 | 22 (R) 23 |
| 2023-05-13 | Seventeen | FML | 1 | 24 |
| 2023-05-20 | Le Sserafim | Unforgiven | 2 | 19 |
| 2023-06-03 | (G)I-dle | I Feel | 7 | 12 (R) 13 |
| 2023-06-17 | Stray Kids | 5-Star | 1 | 38 |
| 2023-06-17 | Enhypen | Dark Blood | 2 | 21 |
| 2023-06-24 | P1Harmony | Harmony:All In | 8 | 7 |
| 2023-07-01 | Ateez | The World EP.2: Outlaw | 1 | 13 |
| 2023-07-15 | Aespa | My World | 1 | 15 |
| 2023-07-15 | NewJeans | New Jeans | 24 | 15 |
| 2023-08-05 | NewJeans | Get Up | 1 | 39 (R) 40 |
| 2023-08-12 | Treasure | Reboot | 37 | 2 |
| 2023-08-19 | Itzy | Kill My Doubt | 3 | 10 |
| 2023-08-19 | TXT | Sweet | 7 | 6 |
| 2023-08-19 | Xikers | House of Tricky: How to Play | 15 | 5 |
| 2023-09-02 | Jihyo | Zone | 4 | 8 (R) 10 |
| 2023-09-02 | NCT Dream | ISTJ | 5 | 10 |
| 2023-09-02 | STAYC | Teenfresh | 32 | 2 |
| 2023-09-23 | V | Layover | 2 | 22 (R) 24 |
| 2023-09-23 | BoyNextDoor | Why.. | 10 | 5 |
| 2023-09-23 | Eric Nam | House On a Hill | 41 | 1 |
| 2023-10-07 | The Rose | Dual | 5 | 1 |
| 2023-10-07 | Fifty Fifty | The Beginning | 90 | 1 |
| 2023-10-14 | NCT | Golden Age | 3 | 6 (R) 7 |
| 2023-10-14 | Seventeen | Always Yours | 10 | 2 |
| 2023-10-14 | Oneus | La Dolce Vita | 23 | 1 |
| 2023-10-21 | NCT 127 | Fact Check | 1 | 16 |
| 2023-10-21 | (G)I-dle | Heat | 2 | 5 |
| 2023-10-21 | DPR Ian | Dear Insanity | 13 | 1 |
| 2023-10-28 | TXT | The Name Chapter: Freefall | 1 | 17 (R) 20 |
| 2023-11-11 | Seventeen | Seventeenth Heaven | 2 | 21 (R) 22 |
| 2023-11-18 | Jungkook | Golden | 1 | 24 (R) 26 |
| 2023-11-25 | Stray Kids | Rock-Star | 1 | 31 |
| 2023-11-25 | Aespa | Drama | 5 | 3 (R) 6 |
| 2023-12-02 | Enhypen | Orange Blood | 2 | 34 |
| 2023-12-16 | Ateez | The World EP.Fin: Will | 1 | 16 (R) 20 |
| 2024-02-03 | Nmixx | Fe3O4: Break | 6 | 5 |
| 2024-02-17 | TWS | Sparkling Blue | 10 | 4 |
| 2024-02-24 | P1Harmony | Killin' It | 2 | 6 |
| 2024-02-24 | Itzy | Born to Be | 5 | 6 |
| 2024-03-09 | Twice | With You-th | 1 (Total 2 weeks) | 18 (R) 20 |
| 2024-03-09 | Le Sserafim | Easy | 2 | 14 (R) 15 |
| 2024-03-16 | (G)I-dle | 2 | 4 | 7 |
| 2024-03-23 | Xikers | House Of Tricky: Trial and Error | 3 | 3 |
| 2024-04-13 | J-Hope | Hope on the Street Vol. 1 | 2 | 7 (R) 10 |
| 2024-04-20 | TXT | Minisode 3: Tomorrow | 1 | 23 |
| 2024-05-04 | BoyNextDoor | How? | 6 | 10 |
| 2024-05-11 | Illit | Super Real Me | 8 | 2 (R) 3 |
| 2024-05-18 | Seventeen | 17 Is Right Here | 3 | 16 |
| 2024-05-18 | NCT Dream | Dream()scape | 6 | 3 |
| 2024-06-08 | RM | Right Place, Wrong Person | 2 | 7 (R) 9 |
| 2024-06-15 | Ateez | Golden Hour: Part.1 | 1 | 13 (R) 14 |
| 2024-06-15 | ARTMS | DALL | 24 | 1 |
| 2024-06-22 | Peggy Gou | I Hear You | 43 | 1 |
| 2024-06-29 | Nayeon | Na | 1 | 7 |
| 2024-07-13 | TWS | Summer Beat! | 38 | 1 |
| 2024-06-20 | Aespa | Armageddon | 2 | 10 |
| 2024-07-27 | Enhypen | Romance: Untold | 1 | 39 (R) 45 |
| 2024-08-03 | Stray Kids | Ate | 1 (Total 2 weeks) | 27 (R) 28 |
| 2024-08-03 | Jimin | Muse | 2 | 7 |
| 2024-08-03 | NCT 127 | Walk | 8 | 3 (R) 5 |
| 2024-08-17 | Red Velvet | Cosmic | 6 | 3 |
| 2024-08-17 | Riize | Riizing | 11 | 3 |
| 2024-08-24 | (G)I-dle | I Sway | 11 | 2 |
| 2024-09-07 | Nmixx | Fe3O4: Stick Out | 15 | 1 |
| 2024-09-14 | Le Sserafim | Crazy | 1 | 11 (R) 12 |
| 2024-09-21 | Xikers | House of Tricky: Watch Out | 10 | 2 |
| 2024-09-28 | BoyNextDoor | 19.99 | 4 | 5 |
| 2024-10-05 | P1Harmony | Sad Song | 3 | 5 |
| 2024-10-12 | Jaehyun | J | 18 | 2 |
| 2024-10-12 | Lay | Step | 47 | 1 |
| 2024-08-19 | Woosung | 4444 | 15 | 1 |
| 2024-11-02 | Seventeen | Spill the Feels | 1 | 15 |
| 2024-11-02 | Vanner | Burn | 26 | 1 |
| 2024-11-09 | Itzy | Gold | 8 | 3 |
| 2024-11-09 | Aespa | Whiplash | 9 | 6 |
| 2024-11-09 | 82Major | X-82 | 37 | 1 |
| 2024-11-16 | Babymonster | Drip | 11 | 2 |
| 2024-11-16 | Kep1er | Tipi-tap | 7 | 2 |
| 2024-11-23 | TXT | The Star Chapter: Sanctuary | 1 | 12 (R) 14 |
| 2024-11-23 | Illit | I'll Like You | 6 | 4 (R) 11 |
| 2024-11-30 | Ateez | Golden Hour: Part.2 | 1 | 16 |
| 2024-11-30 | Jin | Happy | 3 | 4 (R) 8 |
| 2024-11-30 | NCT Dream | Dreamscape | 21 | 1 |
| 2024-12-21 | Twice | Strategy | 2 | 16 |
| 2024-12-21 | Rosé | Rosie | 3 | 14 (R) 15 |
| 2024-12-28 | Stray Kids | Hop | 1 (Total 3 weeks) | 40 (R) 59 |
| 2025-03-08 | G-Dragon | Übermensch | 10 | 3 (R) 4 |
| 2025-03-15 | Lisa | Alter Ego | 1 | 5 (R) 6 |
| 2025-03-15 | Minnie | Her | 32 | 1 |
| 2025-03-22 | Jennie | Ruby | 2 | 5 (R) 7 |
| 2025-03-29 | Le Sserafim | Hot | 1 | 4 (R) 9 |
| 2025-03-29 | Jisoo | Amortage | 11 | 4 |
| 2025-03-29 | Yeji | Air | 16 | 1 |
| 2025-04-05 | The Boyz | Unexpected | 13 | 1 |
| 2025-04-05 | Nmixx | Fe3O4: Forward | 16 | 1 |
| 2025-04-19 | Zerobaseone | Blue Paradise | 2 | 8 |
| 2025-04-19 | Xikers | House of Tricky: Spur | 6 | 1 |
| 2025-05-17 | TWS | Try With Us | 32 | 1 |
| 2025-05-24 | P1Harmony | Duh! | 3 | 7 |
| 2025-05-31 | Jin | Echo | 2 | 6 |
| 2025-05-31 | BoyNextDoor | No Genre | 3 | 9 |
| 2025-05-31 | Meovv | My Eyes Open VVide | 10 | 2 |
| 2025-06-07 | Baekhyun | Essence of Reverie | 4 | 2 |
| 2025-06-07 | I-dle | We Are | 24 | 1 |
| 2025-06-14 | Seventeen | Happy Burstday | 1 | 12 |
| 2025-06-14 | The Rose | Wrld | 29 | 1 |
| 2025-06-21 | Enhypen | Desire: Unleash | 1 | 20 (R) 31 |
| 2025-06-28 | Ateez | Golden Hour: Part.3 | 1 | 11 |
| 2025-06-28 | Itzy | Girls Will Be Girls (EP) | 9 | 2 |
| 2025-06-28 | Artms | Club Icarus | 40 | 1 |
| 2025-07-05 | KPop Demon Hunters | KPop Demon Hunters (soundtrack) | 3 | 35 |
| 2025-07-12 | Illit | Bomb | 8 | 13 (R) 30 |
| 2025-07-26 | Twice | This Is For | 3 | 32 |
| 2025-07-26 | Riize | Odyssey | 7 | 2 |
| 2025-08-02 | BTS | Permission to Dance on Stage – Live | 2 | 8 |
| 2025-08-02 | Jackson Wang | "Magic Man 2" | 4 | 2 |
| 2025-08-09 | TXT | The Star Chapter: Together | 1 | 16 (R) 21 |
| 2025-09-06 | Stray Kids | Karma | 1 | 26 |
| 2025-09-20 | Aespa | Rich Man | 4 | 3 |
| 2025-09-20 | Zerobaseone | Never Say Never | 5 | 8 (R) 10 |
| 2025-09-20 | Monsta X | The X | 6 | 2 |
| 2025-09-20 | Le Sserafim | Easy-Crazy-Hot | 22 | 1 |
| 2025-09-27 | Cortis | Color Outside the Lines | 3 | 7 (R) 19 |
| 2025-09-27 | Chaeyoung | Lil Fantasy Vol. 1 | 6 | 2 |
| 2025-10-04 | Ive | Ive Secret | 14 | 1 |
| 2025-10-11 | P1Harmony | Ex | 2 | 5 |
| 2025-10-25 | Twice | Ten: The Story Goes On | 2 | 7 (R) 11 |
| 2025-10-25 | S.Coups X Mingyu | Hype Vibes | 5 | 2 (R) 3 |
| 2025-10-25 | Babymonster | We Go Up | 13 | 2 |
| 2025-11-01 | Nmixx | Blue Valentine | 7 | 2 |
| 2025-11-08 | BoyNextDoor | The Action | 6 | 3 (R) 9 |
| 2025-11-15 | Ateez | Ashes to Light | 10 | 1 |
| 2025-11-15 | Xikers | House of Tricky: Wrecking the House | 14 | 1 |
| 2025-11-22 | Yeonjun | No Labels: Part 01 | 1 | 6 (R) 11 |
| 2025-11-29 | Itzy | Tunnel Vision | 13 | 1 |
| 2025-12-06 | Stray Kids | Do It | 1 (Total 2 weeks) | 13 |
| 2025-12-06 | Xlov | Uxlxve | 44 | 1 |
| 2026-01-31 | Enhypen | The Sin: Vanish | 1 | 5 |
| 2026-01-31 | DK X Seungkwan | Serenade | 6 | 2 |
| 2026-02-21 | Ateez | Golden Hour: Part.4 | 1 | 2 |

=== Top Rap Albums (Complete) ===
| Chart date | Artist | Song/Album title | Peak position | Weeks on chart |
|---|---|---|---|---|
| 2013-09-21 | G-Dragon | Coup d'Etat Pt.1 | 19 | 1 |
| 2013-09-21 | G-Dragon | Coup d'Etat Pt.2 | 21 | 1 |
| 2016-10-01 | MOBB | The Mobb | 20 | 1 |
| 2020-06-06 | Agust D | D-2 | 9 | 1 |
| 2020-10-31 | BTS | Skool Luv Affair | 7 | 1 |
| 2022-07-30 | J-Hope | Jack in the Box | 2 | 1 (R) 3 |
| 2023-05-06 | Agust D | D-Day | 1 | 4 |
| 2024-06-08 | RM | Right Place, Wrong Person | 1 | 1 |

=== World Albums (Complete) ===
- Chart started 1990-05-19 and lists top 15 only
- No K-pop listings in 2009
2009 – present

| Chart date | Artist | Song/Album title | Peak position | Weeks on chart (# after Re-entry is total) |
|---|---|---|---|---|
| 2010-03-27 | Epik High | Epilogue | 13 | 1 |
| 2010-07-31 | Taeyang | Solar | 14 | 1 |
| 2010-10-02 | 2NE1 | To Anyone | 7 | 2 |
| 2010-10-30 | 2PM | Still 02:00PM | 13 | 1 |
| 2011-01-29 | G-Dragon and T.O.P | GD & TOP | 11 | 1 |
| 2011-03-12 | Big Bang | Tonight | 3 | 2 |
| 2011-05-14 | Jay Park | Take a Deeper Look | 3 | 1 |
| 2011-08-13 | 2NE1 | 2NE1 2nd Mini Album | 4 | 4 |
| 2011-08-20 | Super Junior | Mr. Simple | 3 | 1 |
| 2011-10-29 | Kim Hyun-joong | Lucky (Kim Hyun-joong EP) | 5 | 1 |
| 2011-11-12 | Tablo | Fever's End: Part 1 | 4 | 2 |
| 2011-11-19 | Tablo | Fever's End: Part 2 | 2 | 2 |
| 2011-11-26 | Wonder Girls | Wonder World | 5 | 1 |
| 2012-02-04 | Girls' Generation | The Boys | 2 | 7 |
| 2012-02-11 | B.A.P | Warrior | 10 | 2 |
| 2012-02-18 | Seven | New Mini Album | 5 | 1 |
| 2012-02-25 | Jay Park | New Breed | 4 | 2 |
| 2012-03-10 | miss A | Touch | 13 | 1 |
| 2012-03-17 | BigBang | Alive | 4 | 5 |
| 2012-03-31 | Shinee | Sherlock | 5 | 4 |
| 2012-04-28 | Exo-K | Mama | 8 | 1 |
| 2012-04-28 | Exo-M | Mama | 12 | 1 |
| 2012-05-12 | Girls' Generation-TTS | Twinkle | 1 | 2 |
| 2012-05-12 | B.A.P | Power | 10 | 1 |
| 2012-06-23 | U-KISS | DoraDora | 12 | 1 |
| 2012-06-02 | Junsu | Tarantallegra | 10 | 1 |
| 2012-06-16 | BigBang | Still Alive | 3 | 3 |
| 2012-06-23 | U-KISS | The Special To Kiss Me | 14 | 1 |
| 2012-06-23 | Wonder Girls | Wonder Party | 9 | 1 |
| 2012-06-30 | f(x) | Electric Shock | 2 | 2 |
| 2012-07-21 | Super Junior | Sexy, Free & Single | 3 | 1 |
| 2012-08-04 | Psy | Psy 6 (Six Rules), Part 1 | 2 | 8 |
| 2012-08-11 | BoA | Only One | 12 | 1 |
| 2012-08-25 | Beast | Midnight Sun | 15 | 1 |
| 2012-09-29 | G-Dragon | One of a Kind | 1 | 5 (R) 7 |
| 2012-10-06 | U-KISS | Stop Girl | 14 | 1 |
| 2012-10-13 | TVXQ | Catch Me | 6 | 1 |
| 2012-11-03 | Block B | Blockbuster | 10 | 1 |
| 2012-11-03 | miss A | Independent Women Part III | 12 | 1 |
| 2012-11-10 | Epik High | 99 | 13 | 1 |
| 2013-01-19 | Girls' Generation | I Got a Boy | 1 | 4 |
| 2013-01-26 | Super Junior-M | Break Down | 1 | 1 |
| 2013-02-02 | CNBLUE | Re:Blue | 1 | 4 |
| 2013-02-02 | Infinite H | Fly High | 8 | 1 |
| 2013-02-09 | Jaejoong | I | 2 | 2 |
| 2013-03-02 | B.A.P | One Shot | 1 | 2 |
| 2013-03-09 | Shinee | Dream Girl – The Misconceptions of You | 2 | 2 |
| 2013-03-16 | Teen Top | No. 1 | 9 | 1 |
| 2013-03-23 | Lee Hi | First Love Pt. 1 | 3 | 1 |
| 2013-03-23 | U-KISS | Collage | 12 | 1 |
| 2013-04-20 | Lee Hi | First Love Pt. 2 | 15 | 1 |
| 2013-05-11 | Shinee | Why So Serious? – The Misconceptions of Me | 1 | 3 |
| 2013-05-25 | 2PM | Grown | 6 | 3 |
| 2013-06-08 | VIXX | Hyde | 7 | 1 |
| 2013-06-08 | 4Minute | Name Is 4Minute | 13 | 1 |
| 2013-06-22 | Exo | XOXO Repackage | 1 | 2 (R) 3 |
| 2013-06-22 | Henry | Trap | 3 | 1 |
| 2013-06-22 | MBLAQ | Sexy Beat | 11 | 1 |
| 2013-06-29 | Sistar | Give It to Me | 9 | 1 |
| 2013-06-29 | Nell | Escaping Gravity | 14 | 1 |
| 2013-07-27 | Jay Park | I Like 2 Party | 1 | 2 |
| 2013-08-03 | Junsu | Incredible | 5 | 1 |
| 2013-08-10 | Kim Hyun-joong | Round 3 | 1 | 2 |
| 2013-08-17 | f(x) | Pink Tape | 1 | 3 |
| 2013-08-24 | B.A.P | Badman | 1 | 2 |
| 2013-08-31 | Beast | Hard to Love, How to Love | 6 | 1 |
| 2013-09-07 | Seungri feat. Jennie Kim | Let's Talk About Love | 2 | 3 |
| 2013-09-14 | Teen Top | Teen Top Class | 7 | 1 |
| 2013-09-21 | G-Dragon | Coup d'Etat Pt.2 | 2 | 5 |
| 2013-09-21 | G-Dragon | Coup d'Etat Pt.1 | 1 | 7 (R) 8 |
| 2013-10-19 | Block B | Very Good | 6 | 2 |
| 2013-10-26 | IU | Modern Times | 4 | 2 |
| 2013-11-02 | Shinee | Everybody | 2 | 3 |
| 2013-11-23 | miss A | Hush | 8 | 1 |
| 2013-12-07 | Trouble Maker | Chemistry | 8 | 1 |
| 2013-12-28 | Exo | Miracles in December | 2 | 4 |
| 2014-01-25 | TVXQ | Tense | 2 | 1 |
| 2014-02-01 | B1A4 | Who Am I | 7 | 2 |
| 2014-02-08 | Got7 | Got It? | 1 | 4 |
| 2014-02-15 | Royal Pirates | Drawing The Line | 8 | 2 |
| 2014-02-22 | B.A.P | First Sensibility | 1 | 4 |
| 2014-03-01 | BTS | Skool Luv Affair | 3 | 1 (R) 54 |
| 2014-03-01 | SM the Ballad | SM the Ballad Vol. 2 – Breath | 9 | 1 |
| 2014-03-08 | Sunmi | Full Moon | 12 | 1 |
| 2014-03-15 | 2NE1 | Crush | 2 | 7 |
| 2014-03-15 | Girls' Generation | Mr.Mr. | 3 | 3 |
| 2014-03-15 | CNBLUE | Can't Stop | 6 | 2 |
| 2014-03-29 | Toheart | 1st Mini Album | 8 | 1 |
| 2014-04-12 | MBLAQ | Broken | 9 | 1 |
| 2014-04-19 | Super Junior-M | Swing | 5 | 1 |
| 2014-04-26 | Akdong Musician | Play | 2 | 2 (R) 3 |
| 2014-04-26 | 4Minute | 4Minute World | 13 | 1 |
| 2014-05-24 | Exo-K | Overdose | 2 | 7 |
| 2014-05-24 | Exo-M | Overdose | 5 | 2 |
| 2014-06-07 | Infinite | Season 2 | 7 | 1 |
| 2014-06-07 | IU | A Flower Bookmark | 14 | 1 |
| 2014-06-21 | Taeyang | Rise | 1 | 5 |
| 2014-06-21 | U-KISS | Mono Scandal | 14 | 1 |
| 2014-07-12 | Got7 | Got Love | 6 | 1 |
| 2014-07-26 | f(x) | Red Light | 2 | 2 |
| 2014-07-26 | Beast | Good Luck | 7 | 1 |
| 2014-08-02 | Henry | Fantastic | 6 | 1 |
| 2014-08-02 | B1A4 | Solo Day | 8 | 1 |
| 2014-08-09 | Block B | H.E.R | 6 | 2 |
| 2014-08-09 | Sistar | Touch N Move | 8 | 1 |
| 2014-08-16 | JYJ | Just Us | 4 | 1 |
| 2014-08-30 | Winner | 2014 S/S | 1 | 3 |
| 2014-09-06 | Taemin | Ace | 2 | 2 |
| 2014-09-06 | BTS | Dark & Wild | 3 | 3 (R) 12 |
| 2014-09-13 | Super Junior | Mamacita | 1 | 2 |
| 2014-09-20 | Jay Park | Evolution | 5 | 1 |
| 2014-09-20 | Hyuna | A Talk | 13 | 1 |
| 2014-09-27 | T-ara | And & End | 12 | 1 |
| 2014-10-04 | 2PM | Go Crazy | 7 | 1 |
| 2014-10-04 | Girls' Generation-TTS | Holler | 1 | 2 |
| 2014-10-11 | Ailee | Magazine | 10 | 1 |
| 2014-10-18 | Kim Dong-ryool | Walking With | 3 | ? |
| 2014-11-08 | Epik High | Shoebox | 1 | 2 |
| 2014-11-08 | VIXX | Error | 3 | 1 |
| 2014-11-08 | Seo Taiji | 9th Quiet Night | 6 | 1 |
| 2014-11-15 | Zhou Mi (singer) | Rewind | 12 | 1 |
| 2014-11-29 | Kyuhyun | At Gwanghwamun | 2 | 1 |
| 2014-12-06 | Got7 | Identify | 6 | 1 |
| 2014-12-06 | Beast | Time | 11 | 1 |
| 2015-01-24 | Jonghyun | Base | 1 (Note: Peaked 2nd week, 2015-01-31 (1 week)) | 3 (R) 4 |
| 2015-02-07 | Jung Yong-hwa | One Fine Day | 1 | 3 |
| 2015-02-07 | G.Soul | Coming Home | 6 | 1 |
| 2015-02-28 | Amber | Beautiful | 2 | 3 (R) 5 |
| 2015-03-07 | Niel | ONIELy | 12 | 1 |
| 2015-03-14 | Shinhwa | We | 6 | 1 |
| 2015-03-21 | 4Minute | Crazy | 1 | 2 |
| 2015-03-21 | Donghae & Eunhyuk | The Beat Goes On | 4 | 1 |
| 2015-03-21 | Junsu | Flower | 7 | 1 |
| 2015-03-28 | Gain | Hawwah | 9 | 1 |
| 2015-04-04 | Red Velvet | Ice Cream Cake | 2 | 3 |
| 2015-04-04 | MFBTY | WondaLand | 8 | 2 |
| 2015-04-11 | F.T. Island | I Will | 7 | 1 |
| 2015-04-18 | Exo | Exodus | 1 | 6 (R) 7 |
| 2015-04-18 | miss A | Colors | 4 | 2 |
| 2015-04-18 | RM | R.M. | 12 | 1 |
| 2015-05-02 | BASTARZ | Conduct Zero | 11 | 1 |
| 2015-05-02 | EXID | Ah Yeah | 12 | 1 |
| 2015-05-16 | BTS | The Most Beautiful Moment In Life, Part 1 | 2 | 2 (R) 14 |
| 2015-05-16 | Lim Kim | Simple Mind | 10 | 1 |
| 2015-05-30 | BoA | Kiss My Lips | 6 | 1 |
| 2015-05-30 | Kim Sung-kyu | 27 | 8 | 1 |
| 2015-06-06 | Shinee | Odd | 1 | 3 |
| 2015-06-13 | Seventeen | 17 Carat | 8 | 4 (R) 11 |
| 2015-06-20 | Exo | Love Me Right | 2 | 4 (R) 6 |
| 2015-07-04 | 2PM | No.5 | 3 | 1 |
| 2015-07-04 | Mamamoo | Pink Funky | 7 | 1 |
| 2015-07-11 | AOA | Heart Attack | 5 | 3 |
| 2015-07-11 | Sistar | Shake It | 6 | 1 |
| 2015-07-11 | Teen Top | Natural Born Teen Top | 13 | 1 |
| 2015-07-18 | Hyukoh | 22 | 4 | 7 |
| 2015-07-18 | Nine Muses | 9Muses S/S Edition | 8 | 2 |
| 2015-08-22 | Wonder Girls | Reboot | 2 | 3 |
| 2015-08-22 | Shinee | Married to the Music | 5 | 2 |
| 2015-09-05 | Girls' Generation | Lion Heart | 1 | 4 |
| 2015-09-05 | VIXX LR | Beautiful Liar | 2 | 3 |
| 2015-09-12 | Infinite Challenge | Infinite Challenge (Soundtrack) | 3 | 3 |
| 2015-09-26 | Red Velvet | The Red | 1 | 2 |
| 2015-09-26 | Day6 | The Day | 2 | 4 |
| 2015-10-03 | Seventeen | Boys Be | 1 | 6 (R) 11 |
| 2015-10-03 | CNBLUE | 2gether | 3 | 2 |
| 2015-10-03 | Jonghyun | Story Op.1 | 7 | 2 |
| 2015-10-10 | Hyuna | A+ | 2 | 2 |
| 2015-10-10 | Gary | 2002 | 6 | 1 |
| 2015-10-17 | Got7 | Mad | 1 | 5 |
| 2015-10-17 | iKon | Welcome Back | 2 | 5 |
| 2015-10-24 | Taeyeon | I | 1 | 4 |
| 2015-10-24 | Ailee | Vivid | 6 | 1 |
| 2015-10-31 | Kyuhyun | Fall, Once Again | 12 | 1 |
| 2015-11-07 | Junsu | Yesterday | 9 | 1 |
| 2015-11-14 | f(x) | 4 Walls | 1 | 3 |
| 2015-11-14 | IU | Chat-Shire | 4 | 3 |
| 2015-11-21 | Jay Park | Worldwide | 5 | 2 |
| 2015-11-21 | Brown Eyed Girls | Basic | 14 | 1 |
| 2015-11-28 | VIXX | Chained Up | 3 | 2 |
| 2015-12-05 | B.A.P | Matrix | 3 | 3 |
| 2015-12-19 | BTS | The Most Beautiful Moment In Life, Part 2 | 1 (Total 4 weeks) (Note: Entered at No. 1 (1 week), returned to No. 1 on 2016-01-16 (3 weeks)) | 20 (R) 22 |
| 2015-12-19 | Psy | Chiljip Psy-da | 6 | 3 |
| 2015-12-19 | Got7 | Mad: Winter Edition | 12 | 1 |
| 2015-12-26 | Girls' Generation-TTS | Dear Santa: X-Mas Special | 4 | 1 |
| 2015-12-26 | Exo | Sing For You | 6 | 3 |
| 2015-12-26 | Royal Pirates | 3.3 | 15 | 1 |
| 2016-01-09 | iKon | Welcome Back (See also Welcome Back 2015-10-17) | 2 | 3 |
| 2016-01-23 | Twice | The Story Begins | 15 | 1 |
| 2016-02-06 | Teen Top | Red Point | 12 | 1 |
| 2016-02-13 | Ryeowook | The Little Prince | 5 | 2 |
| 2016-02-13 | GFriend | Snowflake | 10 | 1 |
| 2016-02-20 | Winner | Exit E | 2 | 4 |
| 2016-02-20 | 4Minute | Act. 7 | 3 | 3 |
| 2016-03-05 | Jaejoong | No.X | 3 | 1 |
| 2016-03-05 | NU'EST | Q Is. | 11 | 2 |
| 2016-03-12 | Taemin | Press It | 2 | 3 |
| 2016-03-12 | B.A.P | Carnival | 3 | 2 |
| 2016-03-12 | Astro | Spring Up | 6 | 2 |
| 2016-03-26 | Lee Hi | Seoulite | 3 | 4 |
| 2016-03-26 | Mamamoo | Melting | 8 | 1 |
| 2016-04-02 | Red Velvet | The Velvet | 8 | 2 |
| 2016-04-09 | Got7 | Fly | 2 | 5 |
| 2016-04-09 | Eric Nam | Interview | 12 | 2 |
| 2016-04-16 | Dean | 130 mood : TRBL | 3 | 3 (R) 7 |
| 2016-04-16 | Day6 | Daydream | 6 | 2 |
| 2016-04-23 | CNBLUE | Blueming | 10 | 1 |
| 2016-04-30 | Block B | Blooming Period | 4 | 1 |
| 2016-05-07 | Jung Eun-ji | Dream | 13 | 1 |
| 2016-05-07 | Yesung | Here I Am | 15 | 1 |
| 2016-05-14 | Seventeen | Love & Letter | 3 | 3 (R) 4 |
| 2016-05-14 | Twice | Page Two | 6 | 2 |
| 2016-05-21 | BTS | The Most Beautiful Moment In Life: Young Forever | 2 | 4 (R) 6 |
| 2016-05-21 | Akdong Musician | Spring | 5 | 2 |
| 2016-05-28 | Tiffany Young | I Just Wanna Dance | 3 | 3 |
| 2016-05-28 | Nam Woo-hyun | Write.. | 9 | 1 |
| 2016-05-28 | Crush | Interlude | 14 | 1 |
| 2016-06-04 | Jessica | With Love, J | 4 | 2 |
| 2016-06-04 | Monsta X | The Clan, Pt. 1 – Lost | 5 | 3 (R) 4 |
| 2016-06-04 | AOA | Good Luck | 7 | 2 |
| 2016-06-11 | Jonghyun | She Is | 4 | 2 |
| 2016-06-18 | Luna | Free Somebody | 3 | 2 |
| 2016-06-18 | EXID | Street | 9 | 2 |
| 2016-06-18 | Junsu | Xignature | 14 | 1 |
| 2016-06-25 | Exo | Ex'Act | 2 | 3 |
| 2016-06-25 | U-KISS | Stalker | 11 | 1 |
| 2016-06-25 | KNK | Awake | 14 | 1 |
| 2016-07-09 | Sistar | Insane Love | 7 | 2 |
| 2016-07-09 | Show Me the Money Soundtrack | Show Me the Money 5, Episode 1 | 13 | 1 |
| 2016-07-16 | Taeyeon | Why | 2 | 3 |
| 2016-07-23 | Astro | Summer Vibes | 6 | 1 |
| 2016-07-30 | NCT 127 | NCT 127 | 2 | 3 |
| 2016-07-30 | GFriend | LOL | 7 | 1 |
| 2016-07-30 | Jay Park & Ugly Duck | Scene Stealers | 8 | 2 |
| 2016-07-30 | Beast | Highlight | 9 | 1 |
| 2016-08-06 | F.T. Island | Where's the Truth? | 5 | 2 |
| 2016-08-27 | Hyuna | A'wesome | 4 | 2 |
| 2016-08-27 | Jun. K | Mr. NO♡ | 9 | 1 |
| 2016-09-03 | Exo | Lotto | 10 | 2 |
| 2016-09-03 | WJSN | The Secret | 12 | 1 |
| 2016-09-10 | Park Jimin | 19 to 20 | 11 | 1 |
| 2016-09-17 | NU'EST | Canvas | 12 | 2 |
| 2016-09-24 | Red Velvet | Russian Roulette | 2 | 2 |
| 2016-10-01 | MOBB | The Mobb | 1 | 3 |
| 2016-10-01 | 2PM | Gentlemen's Game | 11 | 2 |
| 2016-10-08 | Infinite | Infinite Only | 3 | 3 |
| 2016-10-15 | Got7 | Flight Log: Turbulence | 1 | 4 (R) 5 |
| 2016-10-15 | Apink | Pink Revolution | 12 | 1 |
| 2016-10-22 | Shinee | 1 of 1 | 2 | 2 |
| 2016-10-22 | Monsta X | The Clan 2.5 Pt. 2 Guilty | 3 | 2 |
| 2016-10-22 | Ailee | A New Empire | 9 | 2 |
| 2016-10-29 | BTS | Wings | 1 (Total 2 weeks) | 20 (R) 45 |
| 2016-11-05 | Jay Park | Everything You Wanted | 3 | 3 |
| 2016-11-05 | I.O.I | Miss Me? | 11 | 1 |
| 2016-11-12 | Twice | Twicecoaster: Lane 1 | 3 | 1 |
| 2016-11-19 | Exo-CBX | Hey Mama! | 1 | 2 |
| 2016-11-19 | Blackpink | Square Two | 2 | 5 (R) 22 |
| 2016-11-19 | VIXX | Kratos | 5 | 1 |
| 2016-11-26 | B.A.P | Noir | 1 | 1 |
| 2016-11-26 | Mamamoo | Memory | 12 | 1 |
| 2016-12-03 | Astro | Autumn Story | 15 | 1 |
| 2016-12-17 | B1A4 | Good Timing | 9 | 1 |
| 2016-12-24 | Seventeen | Going Seventeen | 3 | 1 (R) 3 |
| 2016-12-31 | BigBang | Made | 1 | 11 (R) 17 |
| 2016-12-31 | Jessica | Wonderland | 7 | 1 |
| 2017-01-07 | Exo | For Life | 9 | 1 |
| 2017-01-21 | AOA | Angel's Knock | 5 | 2 |
| 2017-01-21 | Akdong Musician | Winter | 7 | 2 |
| 2017-01-28 | NCT 127 | Limitless | 1 | 2 |
| 2017-01-28 | Ravi | R.Eal1ze | 8 | 2 |
| 2017-02-04 | Seohyun | Don't Say No | 3 | 2 |
| 2017-02-04 | CLC | Crystyle | 6 | 2 |
| 2017-02-11 | Suzy | Yes? No? | 15 | 1 |
| 2017-02-18 | Red Velvet | Rookie | 1 | 2 |
| 2017-02-18 | Zion.T | OO | 2 | 3 |
| 2017-02-25 | SF9 | Burning Sensation | 6 | 1 |
| 2017-03-04 | BTS | You Never Walk Alone | 1 | 8 (R) 81 |
| 2017-02-11 | Twice | Twicecoaster: Lane 2 | 4 | 1 |
| 2017-03-18 | Taeyeon | My Voice | 2 | 2 (R) 3 |
| 2017-03-25 | GFriend | The Awakening | 5 | 1 |
| 2017-03-25 | BtoB | Feel'eM | 15 | 1 |
| 2017-04-01 | Got7 | Flight Log: Arrival | 1 | 3 |
| 2017-04-08 | Monsta X | The Clan Pt. 2.5: The Final Chapter | 1 | 2 |
| 2017-04-08 | CNBLUE | 7°CN | 8 | 1 |
| 2017-04-08 | Highlight | Can You Feel It? | 9 | 1 |
| 2017-04-08 | Pristin | Hi! Pristin | 10 | 1 |
| 2017-04-15 | Girl's Day | Girl's Day Everyday #5 | 7 | 1 |
| 2017-04-15 | DPR Live | Coming To You Live | 14 | 1 |
| 2017-04-29 | EXID | Eclipse | 4 | 2 |
| 2017-05-06 | Minzy | Minzy Work 01. "Uno" | 2 | 2 |
| 2017-05-06 | SF9 | Breaking Sensation | 5 | 1 |
| 2017-05-13 | IU | Palette | 1 | 2 |
| 2017-05-13 | Hyukoh | 23 | 6 | 1 |
| 2017-05-13 | Jonghyun | Story Op.2 | 7 | 1 |
| 2017-05-20 | Sechs Kies | The 20th Anniversary | 9 | 1 |
| 2017-05-20 | Triple H | 199X | 10 | 1 |
| 2017-05-27 | Psy | 4X2=8 | 5 | 1 |
| 2017-06-03 | Twice | Signal | 3 | 2 |
| 2017-06-03 | VIXX | Shangri-La | 4 | 2 |
| 2017-06-10 | Seventeen | Al1 | 2 | 4 |
| 2017-06-17 | Astro | Dream Part.01 | 6 | 1 |
| 2017-06-17 | Loco | Bleached | 7 | 1 |
| 2017-06-24 | G-Dragon | Kwon Ji Yong | 1 (Total 2 weeks) | 11 |
| 2017-06-24 | Day6 | Sunrise | 6 | 2 |
| 2017-06-24 | Produce 101 Season 2 contestants | 35 Boys 5 Concepts | 9 | 1 |
| 2017-06-24 | Suran | Walkin' | 14 | 1 |
| 2017-07-01 | NCT 127 | Cherry Bomb | 2 | 3 |
| 2017-07-01 | Pentagon | Ceremony | 14 | 1 |
| 2017-07-08 | Monsta X | Shine Forever | 10 | 1 |
| 2017-07-08 | Nine Muses | Muses Diary Part.2 : Identity | 15 | 1 |
| 2017-07-15 | Mamamoo | Purple | 1 | 1 |
| 2017-07-15 | Heize | /// (You Are Cloudy) | 12 | 1 |
| 2017-07-15 | Stellar | Stellar Into the World | 13 | 1 |
| 2017-07-15 | Apink | Pink Up | 14 | 1 |
| 2017-07-29 | Red Velvet | The Red Summer | 1 | 3 |
| 2017-07-29 | Zico | Television | 3 | 2 |
| 2017-08-05 | Exo | The War | 1 (Total 2 weeks) | 10 (R) 11 |
| 2017-08-05 | Kard | Hola Hola | 3 | 2 |
| 2017-08-05 | Jessi | Un2verse | 4 | 1 |
| 2017-08-05 | Jung Yong-hwa | Do Disturb | 12 | 1 |
| 2017-08-12 | Offonoff | boy. | 15 | 1 |
| 2017-08-19 | JJ Project | Verse 2 | 2 | 3 |
| 2017-08-19 | Dreamcatcher | Prequel | 5 | 1 |
| 2017-08-19 | GFriend | Parallel | 10 | 1 |
| 2017-08-26 | Girls' Generation | Holiday Night | 1 | 2 |
| 2017-08-26 | Wanna One | 1X1=1 (To Be One) | 3 | 3 |
| 2017-08-26 | Jessica | My Decade | 5 | 1 |
| 2017-08-26 | CLC | Free'sm | 14 | 1 |
| 2017-09-02 | Taeyang | White Night | 1 (Total 2 weeks) | 5 |
| 2017-09-09 | NCT Dream | We Young | 3 | 1 |
| 2017-09-09 | Pristin | Schxxl Out | 5 | 1 |
| 2017-09-16 | VIXX LR | Whisper | 2 | 2 |
| 2017-09-16 | Hyuna | Following | 5 | 2 |
| 2017-09-23 | Pentagon | Demo_01 | 5 | 1 |
| 2017-09-23 | Jeong Se-woon | Part 1: Ever | 10 | 1 |
| 2017-09-30 | Bobby | Love and Fall | 2 | 2 |
| 2017-10-07 | BTS | Love Yourself: Her | 1 (Total 25 weeks) (Note: Entered at No. 1 (5 weeks), returned to No. 1 on 2017-12-16 (8 weeks), 2018-02-10 (6 weeks), 2018-04-21 (5 weeks), 2023-01-21 (1 week)) | 82 (R) 183 |
| 2017-10-14 | IU | A Flower Bookmark 2 | 5 | 1 |
| 2017-10-14 | B1A4 | Rollin' | 7 | 1 |
| 2017-10-14 | Sechs Kies | Another Light | 10 | 1 |
| 2017-10-21 | BOL4 | Red Diary Page.1 | 9 | 1 |
| 2017-10-28 | Got7 | 7 for 7 | 2 | 5 (R) 6 |
| 2017-10-28 | Lay | Lay 02 Sheep | 4 | 1 |
| 2017-10-28 | NU'EST | W, Here | 5 | 1 |
| 2017-11-04 | Taemin | Move | 3 | 2 |
| 2017-11-04 | SF9 | Knights of the Sun | 7 | 1 |
| 2017-11-04 | Highlight | Celebrate | 9 | 1 |
| 2017-11-04 | BtoB | Brother Act. | 14 | 1 |
| 2017-11-04 | JBJ | Fantasy | 15 | 1 |
| 2017-11-11 | Epik High | We’ve Done Something Wonderful | 2 | 2 |
| 2017-11-18 | Twice | Twicetagram | 1 | 2 |
| 2017-11-18 | Astro | Dream Part. 02 | 5 | 2 |
| 2017-11-18 | Loona Odd Eye Circle | Mix & Match | 10 | 1 |
| 2017-11-25 | Seventeen | Teen, Age | 1 | 3 (R) 8 |
| 2017-11-25 | Monsta X | The Code | 2 | 3 (R) 5 |
| 2017-11-25 | Super Junior | Play | 3 | 2 |
| 2017-11-25 | EXID | Full Moon | 6 | 2 |
| 2017-11-25 | Block B | Montage | 11 | 1 |
| 2017-12-02 | Wanna One | 1X1=1 (To Be One) | 12 | 1 |
| 2017-12-09 | Red Velvet | Perfect Velvet | 1 | 2 (R) 3 |
| 2017-12-09 | Kard | You & Me | 4 | 2 |
| 2017-12-23 | Day6 | Moonrise | 8 | 1 |
| 2017-12-30 | Taeyeon | This Christmas – Winter is Coming | 6 | 1 |
| 2017-12-30 | DPR Live | Her | 8 | 1 |
| 2017-12-30 | Taemin | Move-ing | 11 | 1 |
| 2018-01-03 | Jonghyun | Story Op.2 | 5 | 2 |
| 2018-01-06 | Exo | Universe | 2 | 4 |
| 2018-01-06 | Lay | Winter Special Gift | 8 | 1 |
| 2018-01-20 | Stray Kids | Mixtape | 2 | 3 |
| 2018-01-20 | Infinite | Top Seed | 4 | 1 |
| 2018-01-20 | Oh My Girl | Secret Garden | 12 | 1 |
| 2018-01-27 | Kim Dong-ryul | Reply | 7 | 1 |
| 2018-01-27 | JBJ | True Colors | 8 | 2 |
| 2018-01-27 | Chungha | Offset | 13 | 1 |
| 2018-02-03 | Jonghyun | Poet ｜ Artist | 1 | 4 |
| 2018-02-03 | Ravi | Nirvana | 5 | 1 |
| 2018-02-10 | Red Velvet | The Perfect Red Velvet | 3 | 3 |
| 2018-02-10 | iKon | Return | 4 | 3 |
| 2018-02-10 | Exo | COUNTDOWN | 4 | 3 |
| 2018-02-17 | Seventeen | Director's Cut | 2 | 4 |
| 2018-03-03 | Agust D | Agust D | 3 | 2 |
| 2018-03-03 | BoA | One Shot, Two Shot | 7 | 2 |
| 2018-03-03 | CLC | Black Dress | 7 | 2 |
| 2018-03-10 | J-Hope | Hope World | 1 | 7 (R) 16 |
| 2018-03-10 | Kim Sung-kyu | 10 Stories | 9 | 1 |
| 2018-03-10 | SF9 | Mamma Mia! | 10 | 1 |
| 2018-03-17 | Mamamoo | Yellow Flower | 7 | 2 |
| 2018-03-24 | Got7 | Eyes on You | 2 | 3 |
| 2018-03-24 | NCT 2018 | NCT 2018 Empathy | 5 | 6 |
| 2018-03-24 | Heize | Wish and Wind | 9 | 1 |
| 2018-03-31 | Wanna One | 0+1=1 (I Promise You) | 10 | 2 |
| 2018-04-07 | Monsta X | The Connect: Dejavu | 2 | 4 |
| 2018-04-07 | Stray Kids | I Am Not | 5 | 2 |
| 2018-04-07 | TVXQ | New Chapter No. 1: The Chance of Love | 10 | 1 |
| 2018-04-14 | BTS | Face Yourself | 1 | 8 (R) 58 |
| 2018-04-14 | Winner | EVERYD4Y | 6 | 2 |
| 2018-04-14 | Pentagon | Positive | 10 | 2 (R) 3 |
| 2018-04-21 | Exo-CBX | Blooming Days | 2 | 2 |
| 2018-04-21 | Twice | What Is Love? | 3 | 2 |
| 2018-04-28 | Super Junior | Replay | 2 | 1 |
| 2018-04-28 | VIXX | Eau De VIXX | 3 | 1 |
| 2018-04-28 | Eric Nam | Honestly | 6 | 2 |
| 2018-04-28 | The Rose | Void | 8 | 1 |
| 2018-05-12 | GFriend | Time for the Moon Night | 6 | 1 |
| 2018-05-12 | (G)I-dle | I Am | 5 | 3 |
| 2018-05-19 | Dreamcatcher | Escape the Era | 7 | 2 |
| 2018-05-26 | NCT 127 | Chain | 8 | 2 |
| 2018-06-02 | BTS | Love Yourself: Tear | 1 (Total 12 weeks) (Note: Entered at No. 1 (4 weeks), returned to No. 1 on 2018-07-07 (8 weeks)) | 77 (R) 218 |
| 2018-06-09 | Shinee | The Story of Light | 4 | 3 |
| 2018-06-09 | Loona yyxy | Beauty & the Beat | 6 | 1 |
| 2018-06-09 | AOA | Bingle Bangle | 10 | 1 |
| 2018-06-09 | BOL4 | Red Diary Page.2 | 15 | 1 |
| 2018-06-16 | Wanna One | 1÷x=1 (Undivided) | 8 | 1 |
| 2018-06-23 | Shinee | The Story of Light EP.2 | 4 | 3 |
| 2018-06-30 | Blackpink | Square Up | 1 | 15 (R) 22 |
| 2018-06-30 | Taeyeon | Something New | 4 | 1 |
| 2018-06-30 | BtoB | This Is Us | 15 | 1 |
| 2018-07-07 | Shinee | The Story of Light EP.3 | 4 | 2 |
| 2018-07-07 | Day6 | Shoot Me: Youth Part 1 | 6 | 3 |
| 2018-07-07 | NU'EST | Who, You | 9 | 1 |
| 2018-07-14 | Apink | ONE & SIX | 11 | 1 |
| 2018-07-14 | Red Velvet | #Cookie Jar | 13 | 1 |
| 2018-07-21 | Twice | Summer Nights | 4 | 1 |
| 2018-07-28 | Seventeen | You Make My Day | 3 | 2 |
| 2018-07-28 | Mamamoo | Red Moon | 4 | 2 |
| 2018-07-28 | Crush | Wonderlost | 9 | 1 |
| 2018-07-28 | Got7 | The New Era | 10 | 1 |
| 2018-07-28 | GFriend | Sunny Summer | 12 | 1 |
| 2018-08-04 | Seungri | The Great Seungri | 3 | |
| 2018-08-04 | Astro | Rise Up | 7 | 1 |
| 2018-08-04 | Kard | Rise In The Wind | 8 | 2 |
| 2018-08-11 | iKon | New Kids: Continue | 4 | 2 |
| 2018-08-11 | Leo | Canvas | 7 | 1 |
| 2018-08-11 | SF9 | Sensuous | 10 | 2 |
| 2018-08-11 | F.T. Island | What If | 14 | 1 |
| 2018-08-18 | Red Velvet | Summer Magic | 3 | 2 |
| 2018-08-18 | Stray Kids | I Am Who | 5 | 4 |
| 2018-08-25 | Super Junior-D&E | Bout You | 12 | 2 |
| 2018-09-01 | Loona | ++ | 4 | 2 |
| 2018-09-01 | Produce 48 | 30 Girls 6 Concepts | 9 | 1 |
| 2018-09-08 | BTS | Love Yourself: Answer | 1 (Total 31 weeks) (Note: Entered at No. 1 (8 weeks), returned to No. 1 on 2018-12-01 (18 weeks), 2020-01-18 (1 week), 2020-02-01 (4 weeks)) | 162 (R) 201 |
| 2018-09-15 | NCT Dream | We Go Up | 5 | 5 |
| 2018-09-15 | Jooheon | DWTD | 8 | 1 |
| 2018-09-15 | Park Jimin | jiminxjamie | 11 | 1 |
| 2018-09-22 | Shinee | The Story of Light Epilogue | 9 | 1 |
| 2018-09-22 | Oh My Girl | Remember Me | 13 | 1 |
| 2018-09-29 | Got7 | Present: You | 3 | 3 |
| 2018-09-29 | Dreamcatcher | Alone in the City | 7 | 2 |
| 2018-09-29 | WJSN | WJ Please? | 14 | 1 |
| 2018-10-13 | iKon | New Kids: The Final | 5 | 2 |
| 2018-10-13 | The Rose | Dawn | 5 | 2 |
| 2018-10-13 | Yuri | The First Scene | 10 | 2 |
| 2018-10-27 | NCT 127 | Regular-Irregular | 2 | 19 (R) 26 |
| 2018-10-27 | Zion T | ZZZ | 12 | 1 |
| 2018-11-03 | RM | mono. | 2 | 5 (R) 9 |
| 2018-11-03 | Monsta X | Take.1 Are You There? | 7 | 4 (R) 27 |
| 2018-11-03 | Stray Kids | I Am You | 8 | 1 (R) 6 |
| 2018-11-03 | BoA | Woman | 11 | 1 |
| 2018-11-03 | Ateez | Treasure | 9 | 2 (R) 13 |
| 2018-11-10 | Iz One | Color*Iz | 9 | 1 |
| 2018-11-17 | Exo | Don't Mess Up My Tempo | 1 (Total 2 weeks) | 24 (R) 30 |
| 2018-11-17 | Twice | Yes or Yes | 7 | 2 |
| 2018-11-17 | B.A.P | The Recollection | 15 | 1 |
| 2018-12-01 | Wanna One | 1¹¹=1 (Power of Destiny) | 12 | 1 |
| 2018-12-08 | Key | Face | 9 | 1 |
| 2018-12-08 | Mino | XX | 13 | 1 |
| 2018-12-08 | NCT 127 | Regulate | 9 | 1 (R) 4 |
| 2018-12-15 | Red Velvet | RBB | 2 | 7 |
| 2018-12-15 | Onew | Voice | 8 | 1 |
| 2018-12-22 | Day6 | Remember Us: Youth Part 2 | 10 | 1 |
| 2019-01-12 | Exo | Love Shot | 8 | 2 |
| 2019-01-19 | Apink | Percent | 14 | 1 |
| 2019-01-26 | Ateez | Treasure EP.2: Zero to One | 5 | 6 (R) 7 |
| 2019-01-26 | Astro | All Light | 6 | 2 |
| 2019-01-26 | GFriend | Time for Us | 12 | 1 |
| 2019-02-02 | Seventeen | You Made My Dawn | 4 | 2 |
| 2019-02-09 | CLC | No.1 | 5 | 2 |
| 2019-02-16 | Got7 | I Won't Let You Go | 12 | 1 |
| 2019-02-23 | Taemin | Want | 4 | 3 |
| 2019-02-23 | Dreamcatcher | The End of Nightmare | 6 | 2 |
| 2019-03-02 | Loona | X X | 4 | 2 (R) 3 |
| 2019-03-02 | Monsta X | Take.2 We Are Here | 4 | 14 (R) 16 |
| 2019-03-09 | (G)I-dle | I Made | 5 | 2 |
| 2019-03-09 | SF9 | Narcissus | 11 | 1 |
| 2019-03-16 | TXT | The Dream Chapter: Star | 1 | 6 |
| 2019-03-16 | Jus2 | Focus | 6 | 2 |
| 2019-03-23 | Epik High | Sleepless in | 6 | 2 |
| 2019-03-23 | Mamamoo | White Wind | 5 | 2 |
| 2019-03-30 | Bang Yong-guk | BANGYONGGUK | 9 | 1 |
| 2019-04-06 | Stray Kids | Clé 1: Miroh | 3 | 2 |
| 2019-04-06 | Pentagon | Genie:us | 15 | 1 |
| 2019-04-13 | Chen | April, and a Flower | 3 | 2 |
| 2019-04-13 | Iz One | Heart*Iz | 6 | 1 |
| 2019-04-20 | Blackpink | Kill This Love | 1 | 11 (R) 49 |
| 2019-04-27 | BTS | Map of the Soul: Persona | 1 (Total 16 weeks) (Note: Entered at No. 1 (5 weeks), returned to No. 1 on 2019-06-15 (1 week), 2019-06-29 (2 weeks), 2019-07-20 (2 weeks), 2019-08-10 (1 week), 2019-09-21 (1 week), 2019-10-05 (2 weeks), 2020-01-25 (1 week), 2020-02-29 (1 week)) | 93 (R) 151 |
| 2019-04-27 | NCT 127 | Awaken | 15 | 1 |
| 2019-05-04 | Twice | Fancy You | 4 | 2 |
| 2019-05-11 | NU'EST | Happily Ever After | 8 | 1 |
| 2019-05-25 | Winner | We | 6 | 2 |
| 2019-05-25 | EXID | We | 8 | 1 |
| 2019-05-25 | Taeyeon | Voice | 11 | 1 |
| 2019-06-01 | Got7 | Spinning Top | 5 | 2 |
| 2019-06-01 | A.C.E | Under Cover | 9 | 1 |
| 2019-06-08 | NCT 127 | We Are Superhuman | 1 | 25 (R) 30 |
| 2019-06-15 | Lee Hi | 24°C | 7 | 1 |
| 2019-06-15 | Im Yoon-ah | A Walk to Remember | 13 | 1 |
| 2019-06-22 | Ateez | Treasure EP.3: One to All | 8 | 3 |
| 2019-06-29 | Red Velvet | The ReVe Festival: Day 1 | 7 | 2 |
| 2019-06-29 | Stray Kids | Clé 2: Yellow Wood | 9 | 2 |
| 2019-06-29 | SF9 | RPM | 15 | 1 |
| 2019-07-06 | Chungha | Flourishing | 7 | 2 |
| 2019-07-13 | BTS | BTS World: Original Soundtrack | 1 (Total 5 weeks) (Note: Peaked 6th week, 2019-08-17 (5 weeks)) | 38 (R) 52 |
| 2019-07-13 | GFriend | Fever Season | 10 | 1 |
| 2019-07-13 | Ailee | Butterfly | 13 | 1 |
| 2019-07-20 | Baekhyun | City Lights | 4 | 10 (R) 16 |
| 2019-07-26 | Day6 | The Book of Us: Gravity | 9 | 1 |
| 2019-07-26 | Pentagon | Sum(me:r) | 12 | 1 |
| 2019-08-03 | Exo-SC | What a Life | 8 | 1 (R) 9 |
| 2019-08-10 | NCT Dream | We Boom | 7 | 1 |
| 2019-08-10 | Itzy | It'z Icy | 11 | 1 |
| 2019-08-17 | Got7 | Love Loop | 15 | 1 |
| 2019-08-31 | Red Velvet | The ReVe Festival: Day 2 | 6 | 13 |
| 2019-09-07 | X1 | Emergency: Quantum Leap | 9 | 1 |
| 2019-09-28 | Seventeen | An Ode | 7 | 1 |
| 2019-09-28 | Dreamcatcher | Raid of Dream | 10 | 2 |
| 2019-10-05 | Twice | Feel Special | 6 | 2 |
| 2019-10-12 | Chen | Dear My Dear | 7 | 1 |
| 2019-10-12 | Oneus | Fly With Us | 15 | 1 |
| 2019-10-19 | SuperM | SuperM | 1 (Total 12 weeks) (Note: Entered at No. 1 (9 weeks), returned to No. 1 on 2019-12-28 (3 weeks)) | 24 (R) 45 |
| 2019-10-19 | Ateez | Treasure EP.Fin: All to Action | 7 | 2 |
| 2019-10-26 | Super Junior | Time Slip | 9 | 1 |
| 2019-11-02 | TXT | The Dream Chapter: Magic | 3 | 2 (R) 10 |
| 2019-11-02 | Day6 | The Book of Us: Entropy | 10 | 1 |
| 2019-11-02 | Winner | Cross | 12 | 1 |
| 2019-11-09 | Taeyeon | Purpose | 9 | 1 |
| 2019-11-09 | Monsta X | Follow: Find You | 7 | 2 (R) 5 |
| 2019-11-16 | Got7 | Call My Name | 5 | 2 |
| 2019-11-23 | Mamamoo | Reality in Black | 11 | 2 |
| 2019-11-30 | IU | Love Poem | 10 | 1 |
| 2019-12-07 | Exo | Obsession | 1 (Note: Peaked 3rd week, 2019-12-21 (1 week)) | 10 |
| 2019-12-21 | Stray Kids | Clé: Levanter | 9 | 1 |
| 2020-01-04 | Red Velvet | The ReVe Festival: Finale | 3 | 12 |
| 2020-01-18 | Ateez | Treasure Epilogue: Action to Answer | 5 | 1 |
| 2020-02-15 | Loona | # | 4 | 1 |
| 2020-02-15 | Everglow | Reminiscence | 14 | 2 |
| 2020-02-29 | Iz*One | Bloom*Iz | 15 | 1 |
| 2020-03-07 | BTS | Map of the Soul: 7 | 1 (Total 36 weeks) (Note: Entered at No. 1 (2 weeks), returned to No. 1 on 2020-03-28 (10 weeks), 2020-06-13 (2 weeks), 2020-07-11 (5 weeks), 2020-09-05 (5 weeks), 2021-04-24 (5 weeks), 2021-06-12 (1 week), 2021-07-17 (4 weeks), 2022-02-19 (2 weeks)) | 125 (R) 161 |
| 2020-03-21 | NCT 127 | Neo Zone | 1 (Total 3 weeks) (Note: Entered at No. 1 (1 week), returned to No. 1 on 2020-06-27 (2 weeks)) | 50 |
| 2020-03-21 | Itzy | It'z Me | 5 | 6 |
| 2020-04-04 | Stray Kids | SKZ2020 | 14 | 2 |
| 2020-04-11 | BTS | 2 Cool 4 Skool | 12 | 1 |
| 2020-04-11 | Suho | Self-Portrait | 13 | 1 |
| 2020-04-18 | (G)I-dle | I Trust | 4 | 2 |
| 2020-05-02 | Got7 | Dye | 4 | 2 |
| 2020-05-09 | NCT Dream | Reload | 7 | 2 |
| 2020-05-23 | Day6 | The Book of Us: The Demon | 7 | 1 |
| 2020-05-30 | TXT | The Dream Chapter: Eternity | 4 | 2 (R) 7 |
| 2020-06-06 | Agust D | D-2 | 1 | 8 |
| 2020-06-06 | Baekhyun | Delight | 5 | 2 |
| 2020-06-06 | Monsta X | Fantasia X | 5 | 1 (R) 2 |
| 2020-06-13 | Twice | More & More | 2 | 3 |
| 2020-06-27 | Stray Kids | Go Live | 4 | 14 (R) 15 |
| 2020-07-04 | Seventeen | Heng:garæ | 14 | 1 |
| 2020-07-11 | Hwasa | María | 7 | 1 |
| 2020-07-18 | Red Velvet - Irene & Seulgi | "Monster" | 5 | 1 |
| 2020-07-25 | BTS | Map of the Soul: 7 - The Journey | 1 (Note: Peaked 5th week, 2020-08-22 (1 week)) | 16 (R) 30 |
| 2020-08-08 | Ateez | Zero: Fever Part.1 | 6 | 2 |
| 2020-08-29 | Itzy | Not Shy | 8 | 2 |
| 2020-09-19 | Wonho | Love Synonym Pt.1: Right for Me | 9 | 1 |
| 2020-09-19 | Taemin | Never Gonna Dance Again : Act 1 | 11 | 1 |
| 2020-09-26 | Stray Kids | In Life | 4 | 4 |
| 2020-10-10 | SuperM | Super One | 1 | 32 |
| 2020-10-17 | Blackpink | The Album | 1 (Total 6 weeks) (Note: Entered at No. 1 for 2 weeks, returned to No. 1 on 2020-11-07 (2 weeks), 2020-11-28 (1 week), 2021-02-13 (1 week)) | 95 (R) 114 |
| 2020-10-24 | NCT | NCT 2020 Resonance Pt. 1 | 1 (Note: Peaked 2nd week, 2020-10-31 (1 week)) | 40 |
| 2020-10-31 | Loona | [12:00] | 4 | 2 |
| 2020-11-07 | Twice | Eyes Wide Open | 2 | 14 |
| 2020-11-14 | TXT | Minisode1: Blue Hour | 1 (Note: Peaked 2nd week, 2020-11-21 (1 week)) | 12 |
| 2020-11-14 | Monsta X | Fatal Love | 11 | 1 |
| 2020-12-05 | BTS | Be | 1 (Total 21 weeks) (Note: Entered at No. 1 (10 weeks), returned to No. 1 on 2021-02-20 (9 weeks), 2021-06-05 (1 week), 2021-08-14 (1 week)) | 83 |
| 2020-12-12 | Got7 | Breath of Love: Last Piece | 7 | 1 (R) 2 |
| 2020-12-12 | Kai | Kai (EP) | 11 | 1 |
| 2021-01-02 | Enhypen | Border: Day One | 14 | 1 |
| 2021-02-27 | TXT | Still Dreaming | 4 | 8 |
| 2021-02-27 | Chungha | Querencia | 10 | 1 |
| 2021-03-06 | Shinee | Don't Call Me | 7 | 2 |
| 2021-03-13 | Ateez | Zero: Fever Part.2 | 8 | 4 (R) 5 |
| 2021-04-10 | IU | Lilac | 9 | 3 |
| 2021-04-10 | Baekhyun | Bambi | 15 | 1 |
| 2021-05-08 | Enhypen | Border: Carnival | 1 | 2 (R) 6 |
| 2021-05-15 | Itzy | Guess Who | 2 | 7 |
| 2021-05-15 | (G)I-dle | I Burn | 10 | 2 |
| 2021-05-22 | NCT Dream | Hot Sauce | 10 | 2 |
| 2021-05-29 | Taemin | Advice | 14 | 1 |
| 2021-06-12 | TXT | The Chaos Chapter: Freeze | 1 (Total 3 weeks) (Note: Peaked 2nd week, 2021-06-19 (1 week), returned to No. 1 on 2021-09-04 (2 weeks)) | 40 (R) 45 |
| 2021-06-19 | Exo | Don't Fight the Feeling | 8 | 1 |
| 2021-06-26 | Twice | Taste of Love | 1 (Total 2 weeks) (Note: Entered at No. 1 (1 week), returned to #1 on 2021-07-10 (1 week)) | 6 |
| 2021-07-03 | Seventeen | Your Choice | 1 | 10 (R) 13 |
| 2021-07-17 | Loona | & | 14 | 1 |
| 2021-08-07 | D.O. | Empathy | 14 | 1 |
| 2021-08-21 | BTS | BTS, the Best | 1 | 9 (R) 14 |
| 2021-08-28 | Red Velvet | Queendom | 11 | 1 |
| 2021-09-04 | Stray Kids | Noeasy | 5 | 6 |
| 2021-09-25 | Ateez | Zero: Fever Part.3 | 1 | 1 |
| 2021-10-02 | NCT 127 | Sticker | 1 (Total 3 weeks) (Note: Entered at No. 1 (1 week), returned to No. 1 on 2021-11-0-22 (1 week), 2021-12-18 (1 week)) | 33 |
| 2021-10-09 | Itzy | Crazy in Love | 1 | 16 (R) 32 |
| 2021-10-16 | Aespa | Savage | 1 (Note: Peaked 2nd week, 2021-10-23 (1 week)) | 2 (R) 3 |
| 2021-10-30 | Enhypen | Dimension: Dilemma | 1 | 7 (R) 9 |
| 2021-11-06 | Seventeen | Attacca | 1 | 5 (R) 12 |
| 2021-11-06 | CL | Alpha | 15 | 1 |
| 2021-11-13 | Somi | XOXO | 14 | 1 |
| 2021-11-27 | Twice | Formula of Love: O+T=<3 | 1 (Total 3 weeks) | 12 (R) 18 |
| 2021-12-18 | TXT | Chaotic Wonderland | 4 | 2 |
| 2021-12-25 | Ateez | Zero: Fever Epilogue | 1 | 1 |
| 2021-01-01 | NCT | Universe | 1 (Total 4 weeks) (Note: Entered at No. 1 for 4 weeks) | 13 |
| 2022-01-29 | Enhypen | Dimension: Answer | 1 (Total 3 weeks) | 9 |
| 2022-04-02 | Stray Kids | Oddinary | 1 (Total 6 weeks) (Note: Entered at Number 1 for six weeks) | 19 (R) 21 |
| 2022-04-02 | Red Velvet | Feel My Rhythm | 8 | 2 (R) 3 |
| 2022-04-02 | (G)I-dle | I Never Die | 13 | 1 |
| 2022-04-09 | NCT Dream | Glitch Mode | 2 | 1 (R) 4 |
| 2022-05-14 | Psy | Psy 9th | 3 | 2 |
| 2022-05-21 | TXT | Minisode 2: Thursday's Child | 1 (Total 3 weeks) (Note: Peaked 2nd week, 2022-05-28 (3 weeks)) | 19 |
| 2022-06-04 | Got7 | Got7 | 8 | 1 |
| 2022-06-11 | Seventeen | Face the Sun | 1 (Note: Peaked 2nd week, 2022-06018 (1 week)) | 18 |
| 2022-06-18 | NCT Dream | Beatbox | 8 | 5 |
| 2022-06-25 | BTS | Proof | 1 (Total 9 weeks) (Note: Entered at No. 1 for two weeks, returned to No. 1 on 2022-07-16 (1 week), 2022-09-03 (1 week), 2022-10-15 (1 week), 2022-11-05 (1 week), 2022-12-24 (1 week), 2023-01-28 (2 weeks)) | 207 |
| 2022-07-09 | Nayeon | Im Nayeon | 1 | 11 (R) 18 |
| 2022-07-23 | Aespa | Girls | 1 | 8 |
| 2022-07-30 | Itzy | Checkmate | 1 | 10 (R) 11 |
| 2022-07-30 | J-Hope | Jack in the Box | 1 (Note: Peaked at No. 1 on 2023-09-02 (1 week)) | 4 (R) 14 |
| 2022-08-06 | Seventeen | Sector 17 | 1 | 11 |
| 2022-08-13 | Ateez | The World EP.1: Movement | 1 | 3 |
| 2022-08-13 | Enhypen | Manifesto: Day 1 | 1 (Total 2 weeks) (Note: Peaked 2nd week, 2022-08-20 (2 weeks)) | 23 (R) 28 |
| 2022-08-20 | NewJeans | New Jeans | 6 | 11 (R) 47 |
| 2022-09-10 | Twice | Between 1&2 | 1 (Total 3 weeks) | 19 (R) 26 |
| 2022-10-01 | NCT 127 | 2 Baddies | 1 (Total 2 weeks) | 24 |
| 2022-10-22 | Stray Kids | Maxident | 1 (Total 2 weeks) | 10 (R) 35 |
| 2022-10-29 | Le Sserafim | Antifragile | 1 (Note: Peaked 2nd week, 2022-11-05 (1 week)) | 10 (R) 13 |
| 2022-11-05 | (G)I-dle | I Love | 4 | 3 |
| 2022-12-17 | RM | Indigo | 1 (Total 3 weeks) (Note: Entered at No. 1 (1 week), returned to No. 1 on 2022-12-31 (2 weeks)) | 17 (R) 18 |
| 2022-12-17 | Itzy | Cheshire | 2 | 7 |
| 2022-12-17 | Enhypen | Sadame | 5 | 2 |
| 2022-12-31 | Stray Kids | SKZ-Replay | 11 | 2 |
| 2022-12-31 | P1Harmony | Harmony: Set In | 14 | 1 |
| 2023-01-14 | Ateez | Spin Off: From the Witness | 1 | 5 (R) 7 |
| 2023-02-11 | TXT | The Name Chapter: Temptation | 1 (Total 5 weeks) (Note: Entered at No. 1 (5 weeks)) | 27 |
| 2023-03-11 | The Boyz | Be Awake | 6 | 1 |
| 2023-03-18 | NCT 127 | Ay-Yo | 1 | 9 |
| 2023-03-25 | Twice | Ready to Be | 1 (Total 2 weeks) | 23 (R) 24 |
| 2023-04-08 | Jimin | Face | 1 (Total 5 weeks) (Note: Entered at No. 1 (4 weeks), returned to No. 1 on 2024-01-27) | 34 (R) 63 |
| 2023-04-08 | Nmixx | Expérgo | 5 | 2 |
| 2023-04-15 | Xikers | House Of Tricky: Doorbell Ringing | 4 | 2 |
| 2023-04-22 | Ive | I've Ive | 7 | 3 |
| 2023-05-06 | Agust D | D-Day | 1 | 12 (R) 13 |
| 2023-05-06 | Seventeen | FML | 1 (Total 3 weeks) (Note: Peaked 2nd week, 2023-05-13 (1 week), returned to No. 1 on 2023-05-27 (1 week), 2023-06-10 (1 week)) | 17 (R) 18 |
| 2023-05-13 | Le Sserafim | Unforgiven | 1 (Note: Peaked 2nd week, 2023-05-20 (1 week)) | 23 (R) 42 |
| 2023-06-03 | (G)I-dle | I Feel | 1 | 7 |
| 2023-06-03 | Enhypen | Dark Blood | 2 | 1 (R) 24 |
| 2023-06-17 | Stray Kids | 5-Star | 1 (Total 4 weeks) (Note: Entered at No. 1 (2 weeks), returned to No. 1 on 2023-07-22 (2 weeks)) | 44 (R) 82 |
| 2023-06-24 | P1Harmony | Harmony:All In | 3 | 1 |
| 2023-07-01 | Ateez | The World EP.2: Outlaw | 1 (Total 2 weeks) | 7 |
| 2023-07-15 | Aespa | My World | 1 | 7 (R) 8 |
| 2023-08-05 | NewJeans | Get Up | 1 (Total 10 weeks) (Note: Entered at No. 1 (4 weeks), returned to No. 1 on 2023-09-09 (6 weeks)) | 55 (R) 142 |
| 2023-08-19 | Itzy | Kill My Doubt | 2 | 4 |
| 2023-08-19 | TXT | Sweet | 3 | 2 |
| 2023-08-19 | Xikers | House of Tricky: How to Play | 9 | 1 |
| 2023-09-02 | Jihyo | Zone | 2 | 6 (R) 8 |
| 2023-09-02 | NCT Dream | ISTJ | 3 | 8 |
| 2023-09-02 | STAYC | Teenfresh | 14 | 1 |
| 2023-09-23 | BoyNextDoor | Why.. | 3 | 3 |
| 2023-10-07 | Fifty Fifty | The Beginning | 5 | 9 (R) 15 |
| 2023-10-14 | NCT | Golden Age | 2 | 5 |
| 2023-10-14 | Seventeen | Always Yours | 4 | 2 |
| 2023-10-14 | Oneus | La Dolce Vita | 7 | 1 |
| 2023-10-21 | NCT 127 | Fact Check | 1 | 13 |
| 2023-10-28 | TXT | The Name Chapter: Freefall | 1 (Total 2 weeks) | 19 (R) 24 |
| 2023-10-28 | Ive | I've Mine | 12 | 1 |
| 2023-11-04 | Seventeen | Seventeenth Heaven | 1 (Total 2 weeks) (Note: Peaked at No. 1 on 2023-11-11 (2 weeks)) | 18 |
| 2023-11-25 | Stray Kids | Rock-Star | 1 (Total 9 weeks) (Note: Entered at No. 1 (1 week), returned to No. 1 on 2023-12-09 (1 week), 2023-12-30 (7 weeks)) | 33 (R) 61 |
| 2023-11-25 | Aespa | Drama | 2 | 8 |
| 2023-11-25 | Red Velvet | Chill Kill | 11 | 1 |
| 2023-12-02 | Enhypen | Orange Blood | 1 | 32 |
| 2023-12-16 | Ateez | The World EP.Fin: Will | 1 (Total 2 weeks) | 14 (R) 17 |
| 2023-12-30 | BTS | O!RUL8,2? | 6 | 2 |
| 2024-01-20 | Itzy | Born to Be | 2 | 2 (R) 5 |
| 2024-02-03 | Nmixx | Fe3O4: Break | 2 | 4 |
| 2024-02-10 | (G)I-dle | 2 | 3 | 2 (R) 9 |
| 2024-02-17 | TWS | Sparkling Blue | 6 | 2 |
| 2024-02-24 | P1Harmony | Killin' It | 1 (Total 2 weeks) | 5 |
| 2024-03-02 | Le Sserafim | Easy | 2 | 17 |
| 2024-03-09 | Twice | With You-th | 1 (Total 3 weeks) (Note: Entered at No. 1 (2 weeks), returned to No. 1 on 2024-03-30 (1 week)) | 14 |
| 2024-03-23 | Xikers | House Of Tricky: Trial and Error | 1 | 1 |
| 2024-04-06 | Illit | Super Real Me | 2 | 17 (R) 20 |
| 2024-04-13 | J-Hope | Hope on the Street Vol. 1 | 1 | 7 (R) 9 |
| 2024-04-13 | TXT | Minisode 3: Tomorrow | 1 (Total 2 weeks) (Note: Peaked 2nd week, 2024-04-20 (2 weeks)) | 20 (R) 21 |
| 2024-04-20 | Babymonster | Babymons7er | 15 | 1 |
| 2024-05-04 | BoyNextDoor | How? | 3 | 6 |
| 2024-05-11 | Seventeen | 17 Is Right Here | 1 (Total 2 weeks) (Note: Peaked 2nd week, 2024-05-18 (2 weeks)) | 29 (R) 47 |
| 2024-05-18 | NCT Dream | Dream()scape | 4 | 2 |
| 2024-06-08 | Aespa | Armageddon | 1 (Note: Peaked on 2024-07-20 (1 week)) | 21 |
| 2024-06-15 | Ateez | Golden Hour: Part.1 | 1 (Total 4 weeks) (Note: Entered at No. 1 for two weeks, returned to No. 1 on 2024-07-06 (2 weeks)) | 12 (R) 14 |
| 2024-06-15 | ARTMS | DALL | 7 | 1 |
| 2024-06-29 | Nayeon | Na | 1 | 6 |
| 2024-07-27 | Enhypen | Romance: Untold | 1 | 97 |
| 2024-08-03 | Stray Kids | Ate | 1 (Total 8 weeks) (Note: Entered at No. 1 for 6 weeks, returned to No. 1 on 2024-10-19 (2 weeks)) | 96 |
| 2024-08-03 | Jimin | Muse | 1 (Total 8 weeks) (Note: Peaked at No. 1 on 2024-10-12 (2 weeks), 2025-02-01 (2 weeks), 2025-03-01 (4 weeks)) | 86 (R) 89 |
| 2024-08-03 | NCT 127 | Walk | 4 | 2 (R) 4 |
| 2024-08-17 | Red Velvet | Cosmic | 4 | 2 |
| 2024-08-17 | Riize | Riizing | 5 | 2 |
| 2024-08-24 | (G)I-dle | I Sway | 6 | 1 |
| 2024-09-07 | Nmixx | Fe3O4: Stick Out | 5 | 1 |
| 2024-09-14 | Le Sserafim | Crazy | 1 | 11 (R) 37 |
| 2024-09-21 | Xikers | House of Tricky: Watch Out | 6 | 1 |
| 2024-09-28 | BoyNextDoor | 19.99 | 1 | 5 |
| 2024-10-05 | P1Harmony | Sad Song | 1 | 4 |
| 2024-11-02 | Seventeen | Spill the Feels | 1 (Total 3 weeks) | 15 (R) 17 |
| 2024-11-02 | Aespa | Whiplash | 2 | 8 (R) 12 |
| 2024-11-02 | Vanner | Burn | 14 | 1 |
| 2024-11-09 | Itzy | Gold | 3 | 3 |
| 2024-11-09 | 82Major | X-82 | 15 | 1 |
| 2024-11-16 | TXT | The Star Chapter: Sanctuary | 1 (Note: Peaked 2nd week, 2024-11-23 (1 week)) | 19 (R) 20 |
| 2024-11-16 | Kep1er | Tipi-tap | 4 | 2 |
| 2024-11-23 | Illit | I'll Like You | 2 | 21 (R) 22 |
| 2024-11-30 | Ateez | Golden Hour: Part.2 | 1 (Total 3 weeks) | 23 (R) 25 |
| 2024-11-30 | Jin | Happy | 2 | 17 (R) 18 |
| 2024-11-30 | NCT Dream | Dreamscape | 11 | 1 |
| 2024-12-28 | Stray Kids | Hop | 1 (Total 7 weeks) (Note: Entered at No. 1 for five weeks, returned to No. 1 on 2025-02-15 (2 weeks)) | 66 (R) 67 |
| 2025-02-01 | Got7 | Winter Heptagon | 16 | 2 |
| 2025-02-22 | Ive | Ive Empathy | 22 | 1 (R) 2 |
| 2025-03-08 | G-Dragon | Übermensch | 3 | 6 (R) 7 |
| 2025-03-29 | Le Sserafim | Hot | 1 (Total 2 weeks) | 18 |
| 2025-03-29 | Yeji | Air | 6 | 2 |
| 2025-03-29 | Nmixx | Fe3O4: Forward | 6 | 4 |
| 2025-04-05 | The Boyz | Unexpected | 4 | 1 |
| 2025-04-19 | Zerobaseone | Blue Paradise | 1 | 8 |
| 2025-04-19 | Xikers | House of Tricky: Spur | 3 | 2 |
| 2025-05-17 | TWS | Try with Us | 13 | 1 |
| 2025-05-24 | P1Harmony | Duh! | 1 | 9 |
| 2025-05-24 | Meovv | My Eyes Open VVide | 4 | 5 |
| 2025-05-31 | Jin | Echo | 1 | 14 (R) 22 |
| 2025-05-31 | BoyNextDoor | No Genre | 2 | 9 |
| 2025-06-07 | Baekhyun | Essence of Reverie | 1 | 2 |
| 2025-06-07 | I-dle | We Are | 10 | 2 |
| 2025-06-07 | Seventeen | Happy Burstday | 1 (Note: Peaked 2nd week, 2025-06-14 (1 week)) | 15 (R) 21 |
| 2025-06-14 | Enhypen | Desire: Unleash | 1 (Total 4 weeks) (Note: Peaked 2nd week, 2025-06-21 (4 weeks)) | 35 (R) 40 |
| 2025-06-28 | Ateez | Golden Hour: Part.3 | 1 (Total 2 weeks) (Note: Entered at No. 1 for 1 week, peaked again on 2025-07-26 (1 week)) | 21 |
| 2025-06-28 | Itzy | Girls Will Be Girls (EP) | 4 | 2 |
| 2025-06-28 | Artms | Club Icarus | 12 | 1 |
| 2025-06-28 | Stray Kids | Hollow | 18 | 2 |
| 2025-07-05 | Illit | Bomb | 2 | 38 |
| 2025-07-26 | Riize | Odyssey | 4 | 2 |
| 2025-08-02 | BTS | Permission to Dance on Stage – Live | 1 | 13 (R) 14 |
| 2025-08-02 | TXT | The Star Chapter: Together | 1 (Total 3 weeks) (Note: Peaked 2nd week, 2025-08-09 (2 weeks), 2025-08-30 (1 week)) | 25 |
| 2025-09-06 | Stray Kids | Karma | 1 (Total 10 weeks) (Note: Entered at No. 1 for 10 weeks) | 40 |
| 2025-09-20 | Zerobaseone | Never Say Never | 2 | 9 (R) 14 |
| 2025-09-20 | Monsta X | The X | 3 | 3 |
| 2025-09-20 | Le Sserafim | Easy-Crazy-Hot | 9 | 1 |
| 2025-09-20 | Cortis | Color Outside the Lines | 1 (Note: Peaked at No. 1 on 2026-04-25 (1 week)) | 38 |
| 2025-09-27 | Chaeyoung | Lil Fantasy Vol. 1 | 3 | 5 |
| 2025-10-04 | Ive | Ive Secret | 4 | 2 |
| 2025-10-25 | S.Coups X Mingyu | Hype Vibes | 2 | 3 (R) 5 |
| 2025-10-25 | Nmixx | Blue Valentine | 2 | 5 |
| 2025-11-08 | BoyNextDoor | The Action | 1 | 11 |
| 2025-11-08 | Xdinary Heroes | Lxve to Death | 13 | 1 |
| 2025-11-15 | Ateez | Ashes to Light | 3 | 2 |
| 2025-11-15 | Xikers | House of Tricky: Wrecking the House | 4 | 1 |
| 2025-11-22 | Yeonjun | No Labels: Part 01 | 2 | 11 (R) 13 |
| 2025-11-29 | Itzy | Tunnel Vision | 4 | 2 |
| 2025-11-29 | &Team | Back to Life | 5 | 2 |
| 2025-12-06 | Stray Kids | Do It | 1 (Total 8 weeks) (Note: Entered at No. 1 for 8 weeks) | 27 |
| 2025-12-20 | Twice | Enemy (Twice album) | 23 | 1 |
| 2026-01-31 | Enhypen | The Sin: Vanish | 1 (Total 6 weeks) (Note: Entered at No. 1 for 3 weeks, peaked again on 2026-03-21 (1 week), 2026-04-11 (2 weeks)) | 19 |
| 2026-01-31 | DK X Seungkwan | Serenade | 3 | 1 |
| 2026-02-21 | Ateez | Golden Hour: Part.4 | 1 (Total 4 weeks) | 12 |
| 2026-03-07 | Ive | Revive+ | 3 | 6 |
| 2026-03-28 | P1Harmony | Unique | 1 (Total 2 weeks) | 5 |
| 2026-04-11 | "Yuna" | Ice Cream | 12 | 1 |
| 2026-04-18 | T.O.P | Another Dimension | 20 | 1 |
| 2026-04-25 | TXT | 7th Year: A Moment of Stillness in the Thorns | 1 (Total 2 weeks) (Note: Peaked at No. 1 on 2026-05-02 (2 weeks)) | 7 |
| 2026-05-02 | Plave | Caligo Pt.2 | 2 | 1 |
| 2026-05-02 | Xdinary Heroes | Dead And | 8 | 1 |
| 2026-05-16 | Illit | Mamihlapinatapai | 1 | 1 |
| 2026-05-16 | Cortis | GreenGreen | 1 (Total 2 weeks) (Note: Peaked at No. 1 on 2026-05-23 (2 weeks)) | 4 |
| 2026-05-16 | TWS | No Tragedy | 14 | 1 |
| 2026-05-23 | Babymonster | Choom | 18 | 1 |
| 2026-05-23 | Nmixx | Heavy Serenade | 3 | 3 |
| 2026-06-06 | Le Sserafim | Pureflow Pt. 1 | 1 | 1 |
| 2026-06-06 | Xikers | Route Zero: The Ora | 4 | 1 |
| 2026-06-06 | Itzy | Motto | 7 | 1 |

== See also ==
- List of K-pop on the Billboard charts
- List of K-pop songs on the Billboard charts
- List of K-pop on the Billboard year-end charts
- Timeline of K-pop at Billboard
- Timeline of K-pop at Billboard in the 2020s
- Korea K-Pop Hot 100
- List of male K-pop artists
- List of female K-pop artists
- List of South Korean idol groups
