= Enhypen discography =

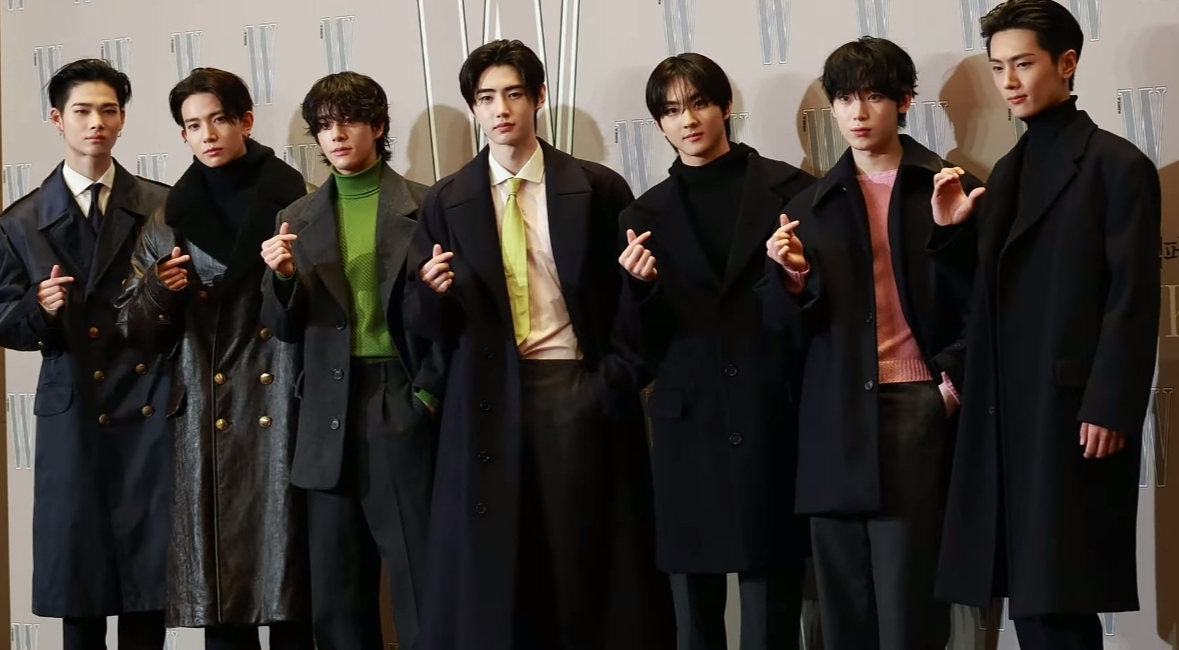
- Studio albums: 3
- EPs: 8
- Soundtrack albums: 10
- Singles: 13
- Music videos: 40
- Reissues: 2

South Korean boy band Enhypen has released three studio albums, eight extended plays (EPs) and thirteen singles and made ten soundtrack appearances.

Formed through the 2020 survival show I-Land, Enhypen debuted in November with the EP Border: Day One. In 2021, they released the EP Border: Carnival and their first studio album, Dimension: Dilemma. In 2022, they released Dimension: Answer, a repackage of Dimension: Dilemma, followed by Manifesto: Day 1, and their debut Japanese-language studio album, Sadame, later that year. In 2023, Enhypen released their Blood series EPs: Dark Blood and Orange Blood. In 2024, they released their second full-length album, Romance: Untold. The group's sixth EP Desire: Unleash was followed by The Sin series, starting with The Sin: Vanish and The Sin: Bliss in 2026, the latter of which became Enhypen's first album to reach number one on the Billboard 200.

As of January 2026, Enhypen has sold approximately 22.4 million cumulative album copies.

== Albums ==
=== Studio albums ===
Title	Details	Peak chart positions										Sales	Certifications
Title	Details	KOR	BEL (FL)	CAN	GER	JPN	JPN Hot	SWI	UK	US	US World	Sales	Certifications
Dimension: Dilemma	Released: October 12, 2021 (KOR); Label: Belift Lab; Formats: CD, digital download, streaming	1	13	50	8	1	1	33	81	11	1	KOR: 1,603,270; JPN: 156,719 (Phy.); US: 31,000	KMCA: Million; RIAJ: Gold (Phy.)
Sadame	Released: October 26, 2022 (JPN); Label: Belift Lab; Formats: CD, CD+DVD, digital download, streaming	—	114	—	—	1	1	79	—	—	5	JPN: 277,261 (Phy.)	RIAJ: Platinum (Phy.)
Romance: Untold	Released: July 12, 2024 (KOR); Label: Belift Lab; Formats: CD, digital download, streaming, vinyl	1	4	—	4	1	1	11	— (Note: Romance: Untold did not enter the UK Albums Chart, but it peaked at number 11 on the UK Album Downloads Chart.)	2	1	WW: 3,400,000; KOR: 3,218,470; JPN: 330,532 (Phy.); US: 124,000	KMCA: 2× Million; KMCA: 2× Platinum (Wev.); RIAJ: Platinum (Phy.)
"—" denotes a recording that did not chart or was not released in that territory

=== Reissues ===
Title	Details	Peak chart positions										Sales	Certifications
Title	Details	KOR	BEL (FL)	CAN	FRA	GER	JPN	JPN Hot	SWI	US	US World	Sales	Certifications
Dimension: Answer	Released: January 10, 2022; Label: Belift Lab; Formats: CD, digital download, streaming	1	15	79	17	14	1	1	21	13	1	KOR: 951,311; JPN: 141,246 (Phy.)	KMCA: 3× Platinum; RIAJ: Gold (Phy.)
Romance: Untold -Daydream-	Released: November 11, 2024; Label: Belift Lab; Formats: CD, digital download, streaming	1	—	—	19	20*	1	1	—	7*	—	KOR: 1,594,639; JPN: 207,005 (Phy.)	KMCA: Million; RIAJ: Platinum (Phy.)
"—" denotes a recording that did not chart or was not released in that territory "*" denotes a recording that charted as a deluxe version

== Extended plays ==
Title	Details	Peak chart positions										Sales	Certifications
Title	Details	KOR	BEL (FL)	GER	HUN	JPN	JPN Hot	POL	SWI	US	US World	Sales	Certifications
Border: Day One	Released: November 30, 2020; Label: Belift Lab; Formats: CD, digital download, streaming	2	60	95	29	2	2	—	99	—	14	KOR: 805,155; JPN: 124,012 (Phy.); JPN: 1,290 (Dig.)	KMCA: 3× Platinum; RIAJ: Gold (Phy.)
Border: Carnival	Released: April 26, 2021; Label: Belift Lab; Formats: CD, digital download, streaming	1	17	26	19	1	1	28	64	18	1	KOR: 1,082,678; JPN: 132,502 (Phy.); US: 20,000	KMCA: Million; RIAJ: Gold (Phy.)
Manifesto: Day 1	Released: July 4, 2022; Label: Belift Lab; Formats: CD, digital download, streaming	2	9	6	5	1	1	8	15	6	1	KOR: 1,659,776; JPN: 140,361 (Phy.); US: 173,000	KMCA: Million; RIAJ: Gold (Phy.)
Dark Blood	Released: May 22, 2023; Label: Belift Lab; Formats: CD, digital download, streaming	1	7	9	2	1	1	8	5	4	2	WW: 1,700,000; KOR: 1,934,257; JPN: 179,850 (Phy.); US: 88,000	KMCA: Million; RIAJ: Gold (Phy.)
Orange Blood	Released: November 17, 2023; Label: Belift Lab; Formats: CD, digital download, streaming	1	22	17	16	1	1	96	15	4	1	WW: 1,700,000; KOR: 2,346,858; JPN: 204,262 (Phy.); US: 87,000	KMCA: 2× Million; KMCA: Platinum (Wev.); RIAJ: Gold (Phy.)
Desire: Unleash	Released: June 5, 2025; Label: Belift Lab; Formats: CD, LP, digital download, streaming	1	2	3	5	1	1	8	11	3	1	WW: 2,130,000; KOR: 2,571,885; JPN: 363,613; US: 261,000	KMCA: 2× Million; KMCA: Platinum (Wev.); RIAJ: Platinum (Phy.)
The Sin: Vanish	Released: January 16, 2026; Label: Belift Lab; Formats: CD, digital download, streaming	1	4	5	23	2	2	6	5	2	1	KOR: 2,422,723; JPN: 358,139; US: 287,000	KMCA: 2× Million; KMCA: Platinum (Wev.); RIAJ: Platinum (Phy.)
The Sin: Bliss	Released: August 21, 2026; Label: Belift Lab; Formats: CD, LP, digital download, streaming	1	3	4	—	1	1	11	4	1	1	KOR: 2,222,739; JPN: 189,859; US: 98,000	KMCA: Million; KMCA: Platinum (Wev.); RIAJ: Platinum (Phy.)
"—" denotes a recording that did not chart or was not released in that territory

=== Special extended plays ===
Title	Details	Peak chart positions					Sales	Certifications
Title	Details	KOR	BEL (FL)	GER	JPN	JPN Hot	Sales	Certifications
Memorabilia	Released: May 13, 2024; Label: Belift Lab; Formats: CD, digital download, streaming	3	132	71	3	3	KOR: 277,135; JPN: 24,311 (Phy.)	KMCA: Platinum

== Single albums ==
Title	Details	Peak chart positions		Sales	Certifications
Title	Details	KOR	JPN	Sales	Certifications
The Sin: Parallel World	Scheduled: November 23, 2026; Label: Belift Lab; Formats: CD, digital download, streaming	To be released			

== Singles ==
=== Korean singles ===
List of Korean singles, with selected chart positions, showing year released, sales, certifications and album name
Title	Year	Peak chart positions										Sales	Certifications	Album
Title	Year	KOR	HUN	JPN Cmb.	JPN Hot	NZ Hot	PHL	UK Sales	US Bub.	US World	WW	Sales	Certifications	Album
"Given-Taken"	2020	— (Note: "Given-Taken" did not enter the Gaon Digital Chart, but debuted and peaked at number 79 on the Gaon Download Chart.)	—	—	3	—	—	—	—	13	—			Border: Day One
"Drunk-Dazed"	2021	118	30	38	44	—	—	—	—	3	— (Note: "Drunk-Dazed" did not enter the Billboard Global 200, but peaked at number 145 on the Global Excl. US.)		RIAJ: Gold (St.)	Border: Carnival
"Tamed-Dashed"	2021	110	—	28	1	—	—	—	—	11	—			Dimension: Dilemma
"Blessed-Cursed"	2022	114	—	21	32	—	—	—	—	7	— (Note: "Blessed-Cursed" did not enter the Billboard Global 200, but peaked at number 184 on the Global Excl. US.)			Dimension: Answer
"Future Perfect (Pass the Mic)"	2022	108	—	27	28	38	—	—	—	—	—			Manifesto: Day 1
"Bite Me"	2023	66	—	15	3	16	14	—	—	7	109	JPN: 1,417 (Dig.)	RIAJ: Gold (St.)	Dark Blood
"Sweet Venom"	2023	120	—	34	33	18	21	60	—	5	104			Orange Blood
"XO (Only If You Say Yes)"	2024	90	—	39	35	16	19	51	—	2	84			Romance: Untold
"No Doubt"	2024	55	—	25	21	40	—	100	—	4	— (Note: "No Doubt" did not enter the Billboard Global 200, but peaked at number 182 on the Global Excl. US.)	JPN: 1,529 (Dig.)		Romance: Untold (Daydream)
"Bad Desire (With or Without You)"	2025	79	—	—	95	20	33	21	—	3	68			Desire: Unleash
"Knife"	2026	38	—	—	46	10	35	54	—	1	90			The Sin: Vanish
"Bloody Paradise"	2026	15	—	46	32	4	—	20	23	—	32			The Sin: Bliss
"I Want You"	2026	To be released												The Sin: Parallel World
"—" denotes a recording that did not chart or was not released in that territory

=== Japanese singles ===
List of Japanese singles, with selected chart positions, showing year released, sales, certifications and album name
Title	Year	Peak chart positions			Sales	Certifications	Album
Title	Year	JPN	JPN Comb.	JPN Hot	Sales	Certifications	Album
"Given-Taken" (Note: The Japanese versions of "Given-Taken" and "Let Me In (20 Cube)", along with the song "Forget Me Not", were combined and released as a triple A-side single titled Border: Hakanai in Japan on July 6, 2021.)	2021	1	1	—	JPN: 254,279 (Phy.)	RIAJ: Platinum (Phy.)	Sadame
"Let Me In (20 Cube)"	2021	1	1	—	JPN: 254,279 (Phy.)	RIAJ: Platinum (Phy.)	Sadame
"Drunk-Dazed" (Note: The Japanese versions of "Tamed-Dashed" and "Drunk-Dazed", along with the song "Always", were combined and released as a triple A-side single titled Dimension: Senkō in Japan on May 3, 2022.)	2022	1	1	—	JPN: 345,984 (Phy.)	RIAJ: 2× Platinum (Phy.)	Sadame
"Tamed-Dashed"	2022	1	1	—	JPN: 345,984 (Phy.)	RIAJ: 2× Platinum (Phy.)	Sadame
"Future Perfect (Pass the Mic)"	2022	—	—	—			Sadame
"Bite Me" (Note: The Japanese versions of "Bite Me" and "Bills", along with the song "Blossom", were combined and released as a triple A-side single titled You (結) in Japan on September 5, 2023.)	2023	2	2	—	JPN: 413,202 (Phy.)	RIAJ: 2× Platinum (Phy.)	Non-album singles
"Bills"	2023	2	2	—	JPN: 413,202 (Phy.)	RIAJ: 2× Platinum (Phy.)	Non-album singles
"Blossom"	2023	2	2	75	JPN: 413,202 (Phy.)	RIAJ: 2× Platinum (Phy.)	Non-album singles
"Shine on Me" (Note: The Japanese version of "Bad Desire (With or Without You)", along with the songs "Shine on Me" and "Echoes", were combined and released as a triple A-side single titled Yoi (宵) in Japan on July 29, 2025.)	2025	2	2	2	JPN: 539,125 (Phy.)	RIAJ: 3× Platinum (Phy.)	Non-album singles
"We'll Be Fine"	2026	—	—	73			Non-album singles
"—" denotes a recording that did not chart

=== English singles ===
List of English singles, with selected chart positions, showing year released and album name
Title	Year	Peak chart positions		Album
Title	Year	NZ Hot	UK Sales	Album
"Loose"	2025	36	56	Desire: Unleash

=== Promotional singles ===
Title	Year	Peak chart positions		Album
Title	Year	KOR	US World	Album
"A Kind of Magic"(Coke Studio Session)	2022	—	—	Non-album promotional singles
"One and Only"	2023	—	—	Non-album promotional singles
"What Makes You Beautiful" (Note: "What Makes You Beautiful" was released as a promotional single for Lee Hyo-ri's Red Lee Hyo-ri's Red Carpet.)	2024	—	—	Non-album promotional singles
"Brought the Heat Back" (solo or with Ava Max)	2024	172	8	Romance: Untold
"Demons" (Note: "Demons" was released as a promotional single for The Seasons: Park Bo-gum's Cantabile.)	2025	—	—	Non-album promotional singles

== Soundtrack appearances ==
Title	Year	Peaks			Sales	Album
Title	Year	KOR	JPN Hot	US World	Sales	Album
"Forget Me Not"	2021	—	—	—		Re-Main OST
"Hey Tayo"	2021	—	—	—		Tayo the Little Bus OST
"Billy Poco"	2021	—	—	—		Tayo the Little Bus OST
"Always"	2022	—	4	—	JPN: 7,979 (Dig.)	Muchaburi! I Am the President OST
"I Need the Light" (구해줘)	2022	— (Note: "I Need the Light" did not enter the Circle Digital Chart, but peaked at number 194 on the Download Chart.)	—	—		Mimicus OST
"One in a Billion"	2022	— (Note: "One in a Billion" did not enter the Circle Digital Chart, but peaked at number 193 on the Download Chart.)	—	—		Memorabilia
"Make the Change"	2022	—	55	—		Saikou no Obahan Nakajima Haruko 2 OST
"Zero Moment" (Note: Credited as Enhypen, but only with the participation of Heeseung, Jay and Jake.)	2022	—	—	—		Summer Strike OST
"Criminal Love"	2023	—	—	12		Memorabilia
"Keep Swimmin' Through"	2023	—	—	—		Baby Shark's Big Movie OST
"—" denotes releases that did not chart or were not released in that region.

== Other charted songs ==
Title	Year	Peak chart positions										Certifications	Album
Title	Year	KOR Circle	KOR Hot	IDN Songs (Note: Billboard's Hits of the World charts launched and were first issued on the date February 19, 2022.)	MLY RIM	MLY Songs	NZ Hot	PHL Songs	SGP RIAS	US World	VIE Hot	Certifications	Album
"Let Me In (20 Cube)"	2020	—	—	—	—	—	—	—	—	24	—		Border: Day One
"Flicker"	2020	—	—	—	—	—	—	—	—	25	—		Border: Day One
"Fever"	2021	— (Note: "Fever" did not enter the Gaon Digital Chart, but debuted and peaked at number 72 on the Gaon Download Chart.)	—	—	—	—	—	—	—	18	—		Border: Carnival
"Not for Sale"	2021	— (Note: "Not for Sale" did not enter the Gaon Digital Chart, but debuted and peaked at number 104 on the Gaon Download Chart.)	—	—	—	—	—	—	—	21	—		Border: Carnival
"Polaroid Love"	2022	112	82	18	5	10	—	20	3	9	30	RIAJ: Gold (St.)	Dimension: Answer
"Daydream"	2024	—	—	—	—	—	—	—	—	10	—		Romance: Untold (Daydream)
"No Way Back" (featuring So!YoON!)	2026	—	—	—	—	—	—	—	—	7	—		The Sin: Vanish
"Stealer"	2026	—	—	—	—	—	—	—	—	9	—		The Sin: Vanish
"Sleep Tight"	2026	—	—	—	—	—	—	—	—	10	—		The Sin: Vanish
"Two Fools"	2026	—	—	—	—	—	25	—	—	—	—		The Sin: Bliss
"Stuck"	2026	—	—	—	—	—	28	—	—	—	—		The Sin: Bliss
"Bad for You"	2026	—	—	—	—	—	20	—	—	—	—		The Sin: Bliss
"—" denotes releases that did not chart or were not released in that region.

== Videography ==
=== Music videos ===
Title	Year	Director(s)	Ref.
"Given-Taken"	2020	Choi Yong-seok (Lumpens)	
"Given-Taken" (Choreography ver.)	2020	Choi Yong-seok (Lumpens)	
"Let Me In (20 Cube)"	2020	Jeong Nu-ri (Cosmo)	
"Drunk-Dazed"	2021	Choi Yong-seok (Lumpens)	
"Drunk-Dazed" (Choreography ver.)	2021	Choi Yong-seok (Lumpens)	
"Fever"	2021	Jeong Nu-ri (Cosmo)	
"Given-Taken" (Japanese ver.)	2021	Seong Won-mo (Digipedi)	
"Tamed-Dashed"	2021	Choi Yong-seok (Lumpens)	
"Tamed-Dashed" (Seaside ver.)	2021	Choi Yong-seok (Lumpens)	
"Blessed-Cursed"	2022	Choi Yong-seok (Lumpens)	
"Blessed-Cursed" (Choreography ver.)	2022	Choi Yong-seok (Lumpens)	
"Tamed-Dashed" (Japanese ver.)	2022	Chung Kiyoul, Seong Won-mo (Digipedi)	
"Future Perfect (Pass the Mic)"	2022	Choi Yong-seok (Lumpens)	
"Future Perfect (Pass the Mic)" (Choreography ver.)	2022	Choi Yong-seok (Lumpens)	
"ParadoXXX Invasion"	2022	Kwon Yong-soo (Studio Saccharin)	
"One in a Billion"	2022	Park Minseon (Studio Lico), Owlbox	
"Future Perfect (Pass the Mic)" (Japanese ver.)	2022	Kwon Yong-soo (Studio Saccharin)	
"Bite Me"	2023	Mingyu Song (Loveandmoney)	
"Sacrifice (Eat Me Up)"	2023	Kwon Yong-soo (Studio Saccharin)	
"Sacrifice (Eat Me Up)" (Performance ver.)	2023	Kwon Yong-soo (Studio Saccharin)	
"Bite Me" (Japanese ver.)	2023	Kwon Yong-soo (Studio Saccharin)	
"Sweet Venom"	2023	Lee Su Ho (Boring Studio)	
"Sweet Venom" (Performance ver.)	2023	Lee Su Ho (Boring Studio)	
"XO (Only If You Say Yes)"	2024	Minjae Kim (PaL)	
"XO (Only If You Say Yes)" (Performance ver.)	2024	Minjae Kim (PaL)	
"Brought the Heat Back"	2024	2eehyein	
"Brought the Heat Back" (Performance ver.)	2024	Beomjin Joe	
"No Doubt"	2024	Yunah Sheep	
"No Doubt" (Performance ver.)	2024	Yunah Sheep	
"Bad Desire (With or Without You)"	2025	2eehyein	
"Bad Desire (With or Without You)" (Performance ver.)	2025	Beomjin Joe	
"Outside"	2025	Kim Hyunsoo (Segaji)	
"Outside" (Performance ver.)	2025	Kim Hyunsoo (Segaji)	
"Shine On Me"	2025	Strtsphr, Yoon Iseo; 2D Animation: Hwang Yewon (AXOO), HyeB (AXOO), Rapbong	
"Knife"	2026	Oh Ximin (NoisyRoom)	
"We'll Be Fine"	2026	Kwon Sumin	
"Bloody Paradise"	2026	HATTRICK	
"Bloody Paradise (Performance ver.)"	2026	markus_beom	
"Checkmate"	2026	Song Taejong	
"I Want You"	2026	ZUAE (NoisyRoom)	

=== Other videos ===
Title	Year	Director(s)	Ref.
"Intro: Walk the Line"	2020	Geeeembo	
"Outro: Cross the Line"	2021	Geeeembo, Kim Rae Hyun	
"Intro: The Invitation"	2021	Geeeembo, Strtsphr	
"Outro: The Wormhole"	2021	Geeeembo, Strtsphr	
"Intro: Whiteout"	2021	Geeeembo, Strtsphr	
"Interlude: Question"	2021	Geeeembo, Strtsphr	
"Outro: Day 2"	2022	Geeeembo, Strtsphr, Hayoung yoon, Jungsoo kim	
"Walk the Line"	2022	Geeeembo, Hakyun, Strtsphr	
"Foreshadow"	2022	Geeeembo, Hakyun, Strtsphr	

=== DVDs ===
Title	Album details	Peak chart positions	Sales
Title	Album details	JPN	Sales
Enhypen 2021 Season's Greetings	Released: January 15, 2021; Label: Play Company Corp.; Format: DVD + Photobook	1	JPN: 12,758
2021 Enhypen Fanmeeting [En-Connect]	Released: July 16, 2021; Label: Belift Lab; Format: DVD + Photobook	3	JPN: 8,671
Enhypen 2022 Season's Greetings	Released: December 20, 2021; Label: Hybe, Play Company Corp.; Format: Digital video (accessible via Weverse) + Photobook	—	—
Pieces of Memories and Memories: Step 1	Release: March 3, 2022; Label: Play Company Corp.; Format: DVD + Photobook	1	JPN: 15,628
Pieces of Memories and Memories: Step 2	Release: August 11, 2023; Label: Play Company Corp.; Format: DVD + Photobook	—	—
