= List of Enhypen live performances =

Enhypen live performances
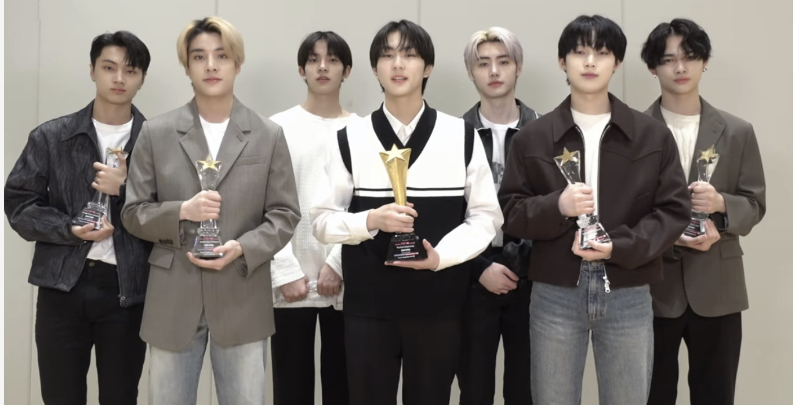
- Enhypen in 2022
- Concert tours: 4
- ↙Fan meetings: 5

The South Korean boy band ENHYPEN debuted in 2020, and since then have embarked on three concert tours and four fan meetings. Their tours have included venues in their home country of South Korea, alongside stops in members Jay, Jake, and Ni-Ki's home countries of the United States, Australia, and Japan, respectively.

Beyond their own events, ENHYPEN have performed at festivals and concerts across the world in South Korea, Japan, the UAE, Germany, France, Spain, Australia, and the United States, including KCON and Music Bank World Tour.

== Concert tours ==
Title	Dates	Associated album(s)	Continent(s)	Shows
Manifesto World Tour	September 17, 2022 – February 5, 2023	Various	Asia; North America	22
Fate World Tour	July 29, 2023 – September 1, 2024	Dark Blood; Orange Blood	Asia; North America	42
Walk The Line Tour	October 5, 2024 – October 26, 2025	Romance: Untold	Asia; North America; Europe	28
Blood Saga Tour	May 1, 2026 –	The Sin: Vanish The Sin: Bliss	Asia; South America; North America; Europe	33

== Manifesto World Tour ==
Manifesto World Tour
- Tour by Enhypen
- Associated album: Border: Day One; Border: Carnival; Dimension: Dilemma; Manifesto: Day 1 Sadame
- Start date: September 17, 2022
- End date: February 5, 2023
- No. of shows: 15 in Asia; 7 in North America; 22 total

Enhypen concert chronology
- Manifesto World Tour (2022–23); Fate World Tour (2023–24)

=== Setlist ===
Seoul, South Korea (September 17, 2022)
1. "Intro: Walk The Line"
2. "Given-Taken"
3. "Flicker"
4. "Not For Sale"
5. "Let Me In"
6. "TFW (That Feeling When)"
7. "Upper Side Dreamin'"
8. "Mixed Up"
9. "Drunk-Dazed"
10. "One In A Billion"
11. "Fever"
12. "Attention Please"
13. "Polaroid Love"
14. "Just A Little Bit"
15. "Tamed-Dashed"
16. "Blessed-Cursed"
17. "Go Big Or Go Home"
18. "Future Perfect (Pass The Mic)"

Encore

1. "Paradoxxx Invasion"
2. "Shoutout"
3. "Outro: Foreshadow"

=== Tour dates ===
Concert dates
Date	City	Country	Venue	Attendance	Revenue
September 17, 2022	Seoul	South Korea	SK Olympic Handball Gymnasium	8,000	—
September 18, 2022	Seoul	South Korea	SK Olympic Handball Gymnasium	8,000	—
October 2, 2022	Anaheim	United States	Honda Center	—	—
October 3, 2022	Anaheim	United States	Honda Center	—	—
October 6, 2022	Fort Worth	United States	Dickies Arena	—	—
October 8, 2022	Houston	United States	Smart Financial Centre	—	—
October 11, 2022	Atlanta	United States	Gas South Arena	—	—
October 13, 2022	Chicago	United States	Wintrust Arena	—	—
October 15, 2022	New York City	United States	Radio City Music Hall	—	—
November 1, 2022	Nagoya	Japan	Nippon Gaishi Hall	60,000	—
November 2, 2022	Nagoya	Japan	Nippon Gaishi Hall	60,000	—
November 9, 2022	Osaka	Japan	Osaka-jō Hall	60,000	—
November 10, 2022	Osaka	Japan	Osaka-jō Hall	60,000	—
November 15, 2022	Yokohama	Japan	Yokohama Arena	60,000	—
November 16, 2022	Yokohama	Japan	Yokohama Arena	60,000	—
January 21, 2023	Osaka	Japan	Kyocera Dome	80,000	—
January 22, 2023	Osaka	Japan	Kyocera Dome	80,000	—
January 28, 2023	Bangkok	Thailand	Impact Arena	20,000	—
January 29, 2023	Bangkok	Thailand	Impact Arena	20,000	—
February 3, 2023	Pasay	Philippines	SM Mall of Asia Arena	27,000	—
February 4, 2023	Pasay	Philippines	SM Mall of Asia Arena	27,000	—
February 5, 2023	Pasay	Philippines	SM Mall of Asia Arena	27,000	—
Total				247,972	$26,877,744

== Fate World Tour ==
Fate World Tour
- Tour by Enhypen
- Associated album: Dark Blood; Orange Blood
- Start date: July 29, 2023
- End date: September 1, 2024
- No. of shows: 30 in Asia; 12 in North America; 42 total

Enhypen concert chronology
- Manifesto World Tour (2022–23); Fate World Tour (2023–24); Walk The Line Tour (2024–25)

=== Setlist ===
Seoul, South Korea (July 29, 2023)
1. "Drunk-Dazed"
2. "Blockbuster"
3. "Let Me In (20 Cube)"
4. "Flicker"
5. "Fever"
6. "Mixed Up"
7. "Future Perfect (Pass the Mic)"
8. "Blessed-Cursed"
9. "Attention, Please!"
10. "Paradoxxx Invasion"
11. "Tamed-Dashed"
12. "TFW (That Feeling When)"
13. "Just A Little Bit"
14. "10 Months"
15. "Polaroid Love"
16. "Shout Out"
17. "Go Big or Go Home"
18. "Chaccone"
19. "Bills"
20. "Criminal Love"
21. "Sacrifice (Eat Me Up)"
22. "Bite Me"

Encore

1. "One In A Billion"
2. "Karma"
3. "Go Big or Go Home"
Seoul, South Korea (February 23, 2024)
1. "Drunk-Dazed"
2. "Blockbuster"
3. "Let Me In (20 Cube)"
4. "Flicker"
5. "Fever"
6. "Still Monster"
7. "Future Perfect (Pass the Mic)"
8. "Blessed-Cursed"
9. "Attention, Please!"
10. "Paradoxxx Invasion"
11. "Tamed-Dashed"
12. "TFW (That Feeling When)"
13. "Just A Little Bit"
14. "10 Months"
15. "Polaroid Love"
16. "One and Only"
17. "Shout Out"
18. "Go Big or Go Home"
19. "Chaccone"
20. "Bills"
21. "Criminal Love"
22. One In A Billion
23. "Bite Me"
24. "Fate"
25. "Sweet Venom"

Encore

1. "Orange Flower (You Complete Me)"
2. "Karma"

=== Tour dates ===
Concert dates
Date	City	Country	Venue	Attendance	Revenue
July 29, 2023	Seoul	South Korea	KSPO Dome	15,000	—
July 30, 2023	Seoul	South Korea	KSPO Dome	15,000	—
September 2, 2023	Osaka	Japan	Kyocera Dome	—	—
September 3, 2023	Osaka	Japan	Kyocera Dome	—	—
September 13, 2023	Tokyo	Japan	Tokyo Dome	—	—
September 14, 2023	Tokyo	Japan	Tokyo Dome	—	—
October 6, 2023	Carson	United States	Dignity Health Sports Park	198,000	$35,500,000
October 10, 2023	Glendale	United States	Desert Diamond Arena	198,000	$35,500,000
October 13, 2023	Houston	United States	Toyota Center	198,000	$35,500,000
October 14, 2023	Dallas	United States	American Airlines Center	198,000	$35,500,000
October 18, 2023	Newark	United States	Prudential Center	198,000	$35,500,000
October 19, 2023	Newark	United States	Prudential Center	198,000	$35,500,000
October 22, 2023	Chicago	United States	United Center	198,000	$35,500,000
January 13, 2024	Taoyuan	Taiwan	NTSU Arena	198,000	$35,500,000
January 14, 2024	Taoyuan	Taiwan	NTSU Arena	198,000	$35,500,000
January 20, 2024	Singapore		Singapore Indoor Stadium	198,000	$35,500,000
January 21, 2024	Singapore		Singapore Indoor Stadium	198,000	$35,500,000
January 26, 2024	Macau	China	Galaxy Arena	198,000	$35,500,000
January 27, 2024	Macau	China	Galaxy Arena	198,000	$35,500,000
January 28, 2024	Macau	China	Galaxy Arena	198,000	$35,500,000
February 3, 2024	New Clark City	Philippines	New Clark City Stadium	198,000	$35,500,000
February 23, 2024	Seoul	South Korea	KSPO Dome	198,000	$35,500,000
February 24, 2024	Seoul	South Korea	KSPO Dome	198,000	$35,500,000
February 25, 2024	Seoul	South Korea	KSPO Dome	198,000	$35,500,000
April 24, 2024	Anaheim	United States	Honda Center	38,900	$7,100,000
April 26, 2024	Oakland	United States	Oakland Arena	38,900	$7,100,000
April 28, 2024	Tacoma	United States	Tacoma Dome	38,900	$7,100,000
May 1, 2024	Rosemont	United States	Allstate Arena	23,400	$4,300,000
May 3, 2024	Belmont Park	United States	UBS Arena	23,400	$4,300,000
June 11, 2024	Saitama	Japan	Saitama Super Arena	—	—
June 12, 2024	Saitama	Japan	Saitama Super Arena	—	—
June 13, 2024	Saitama	Japan	Saitama Super Arena	—	—
June 19, 2024	Fukuoka	Japan	Marine Messe Fukuoka Hall A	—	—
June 20, 2024	Fukuoka	Japan	Marine Messe Fukuoka Hall A	—	—
June 26, 2024	Hiroshima	Japan	Hiroshima Green Arena	—	—
June 27, 2024	Hiroshima	Japan	Hiroshima Green Arena	—	—
August 17, 2024	Jakarta	Indonesia	ICE BSD City Hall 1-2	21,000	—
August 18, 2024	Jakarta	Indonesia	ICE BSD City Hall 1-2	21,000	—
August 24, 2024	Aichi	Japan	Port Messe Nagoya Exhibition Hall 1	—	—
August 25, 2024	Aichi	Japan	Port Messe Nagoya Exhibition Hall 1	—	—
August 31, 2024	Miyagi	Japan	Sekisui Heim Super Arena	—	—
September 1, 2024	Miyagi	Japan	Sekisui Heim Super Arena	—	—
Total				558,400	$76,504,862

== Walk The Line Tour ==
Walk The Line Tour
- Tour by Enhypen
- Associated album: Memorabilia; Romance: Untold; Desire: Unleash
- Start date: October 5, 2024
- End date: October 26, 2025
- No. of shows: 20 in Asia; 6 in North America; 6 in Europe; 32 total

Enhypen concert chronology
- Fate World Tour (2023–24); Walk The Line Tour (2024–25); Blood Saga Tour (2026–)

=== Setlist ===
Set list from October 5, 2024 in Goyang
1. "Brought The Heat Back"
2. "Fever"
3. "ParadoXXX Invasion"
4. "Future Perfect (Pass the MIC)"
5. "Given-Taken"
6. "Lucifer"
7. "Teeth"
8. "Blessed-Cursed"
9. "Fatal Trouble"
10. "Bite Me"
11. "Highway 1009"
12. "Not For Sale"
13. "Yours Eyes Only"
14. "Orange Flower (You Complete Me)"
15. "Scream"
16. "Tamed-Dashed"
17. "Sweet Venom"
18. "Go Big or Go Home"
19. "Hundred Broken Hearts"
20. "Still Monster"
21. "Moonstruck"
22. "XO (Only If You Say Yes"
23. "Paranormal"

Encore

1. "Brought The Heat Back"
2. "Go Big or Go Home"
Set list from October 24, 2025 in Seoul
1. "Future Perfect (Pass the MIC)"
2. "Blessed-Cursed"
3. "No Doubt"
4. "Daydream"
5. "Outside"
6. "Given-Taken"
7. "Lucifer"
8. "Teeth"
9. "Brought The Heat Back"
10. "Fever"
11. "Yours Eyes Only"
12. "Orange Flower (You Complete Me)"
13. "Helium"
14. "ParadoXXX Invasion"
15. "Sweet Venom"
16. "Go Big or Go Home"
17. "Moonstruck"
18. "Fatal Trouble"
19. "Bite Me"
20. "Bad Desire (With or Without You)"

Encore

1. "Karma"
2. "Paranormal"
3. "Attension, please!"
4. "Drunk-Dazed"

=== Tour dates ===
Concert dates
Date	City	Country	Venue	Attendance	Revenue
October 5, 2024	Goyang	South Korea	Goyang Stadium	—	—
October 6, 2024	Goyang	South Korea	Goyang Stadium	—	—
November 9, 2024	Saitama	Japan	Belluna Dome	190,000	—
November 10, 2024	Saitama	Japan	Belluna Dome	190,000	—
December 28, 2024	Fukuoka	Japan	PayPay Dome	190,000	—
December 29, 2024	Fukuoka	Japan	PayPay Dome	190,000	—
January 25, 2025	Osaka	Japan	Kyocera Dome	190,000	—
January 26, 2025	Osaka	Japan	Kyocera Dome	190,000	—
March 1, 2025	Bulacan	Philippines	Philippine Sports Stadium	—	—
June 21, 2025	Bangkok	Thailand	Rajamangala National Stadium	—	—
July 5, 2025	Tokyo	Japan	Ajinomoto Stadium	—	—
July 6, 2025	Tokyo	Japan	Ajinomoto Stadium	—	—
August 2, 2025	Osaka	Japan	Yanmar Stadium Nagai	189,000 (Note: For all 12 shows in August. The two shows in Osaka drew a crowd of 72,000.)	$30,100,000 (Note: For all 12 shows in August. The two shows in Osaka got the revenue of $8,300,000.)
August 3, 2025	Osaka	Japan	Yanmar Stadium Nagai	189,000	$30,100,000
August 6, 2025	Belmont	United States	UBS Arena	189,000	$30,100,000
August 7, 2025	Belmont	United States	UBS Arena	189,000	$30,100,000
August 9, 2025	Chicago	United States	United Center	189,000	$30,100,000
August 12, 2025	Houston	United States	Toyota Center	189,000	$30,100,000
August 13, 2025	Houston	United States	Toyota Center	189,000	$30,100,000
August 16, 2025	Los Angeles	United States	BMO Stadium	189,000	$30,100,000
August 22, 2025	London	United Kingdom	The O2 Arena	189,000	$30,100,000
August 25, 2025	Manchester	United Kingdom	Manchester Arena	189,000	$30,100,000
August 28, 2025	Amsterdam	Netherlands	Ziggo Dome	189,000	$30,100,000
August 30, 2025	Brussels	Belgium	ING Arena	189,000	$30,100,000
September 1, 2025	Berlin	Germany	Uber Arena	—	—
September 3, 2025	Paris	France	Accor Arena	—	—
October 3, 2025	Singapore		Singapore Indoor Stadium	23,700	$5,800,000
October 4, 2025	Singapore		Singapore Indoor Stadium	23,700	$5,800,000
October 5, 2025	Singapore		Singapore Indoor Stadium	23,700	$5,800,000
October 24, 2025	Seoul	South Korea	KSPO Dome	28,800	$3,700,000
October 25, 2025	Seoul	South Korea	KSPO Dome	28,800	$3,700,000
October 26, 2025	Seoul	South Korea	KSPO Dome	28,800	$3,700,000
Total				676,000	

== Blood Saga Tour ==
Blood Saga Tour
- Tour by Enhypen
- Associated albums: The Sin: Vanish; The Sin: Bliss
- Start date: May 1, 2026
- No. of shows: 18 in Asia; 5 in South America; 7 in North America; 5 in Europe; 35 total

Enhypen concert chronology
- Walk The Tour (2024–25); Blood Saga Tour (2026–)

=== Set list ===
Seoul, South Korea (May 1, 2026)
1. "Knife"
2. "Daydream"
3. "Outside"
4. "Brought The Heat Back"
5. "No Way Back (feat. So!YoON!)"
6. "Big Girls Don't Cry"
7. "No Doubt"
8. "Sleep Tight"
9. "Bills"
10. "Moonstruck"
11. "Paranormal"
12. "Blockbuster (Enhypen ver.)"
13. "Go Big or Go Home"
14. "Future Perfect (Pass the MIC)"
15. "Stealer"
16. "Drunk-Dazed"
17. "Bite Me"
18. "Fate"
19. "Criminal love"

Encore

1. "Lost Island"
2. "XO (Only If You Say Yes)"
3. "Blind"
4. "Helium"
5. "Shout Out"

=== Tour dates ===
Date	City	Country	Venue	Attendance	Revenue
May 1, 2026	Seoul	South Korea	KSPO Dome	31,213	$3,648,869
May 2, 2026	Seoul	South Korea	KSPO Dome	31,213	$3,648,869
May 3, 2026	Seoul	South Korea	KSPO Dome	31,213	$3,648,869
July 4, 2026	São Paulo	Brazil	Allianz Parque	41,000	—
July 8, 2026	Lima	Peru	Estadio San Marcos	—	—
July 11, 2026	Mexico City	Mexico	Arena CDMX	—	—
July 12, 2026	Mexico City	Mexico	Arena CDMX	—	—
July 14, 2026	Mexico City	Mexico	Arena CDMX	—	—
July 17, 2026	Dallas	United States	American Airlines Center	—	—
July 18, 2026	Dallas	United States	American Airlines Center	—	—
July 21, 2026	San Diego	United States	Snapdragon Stadium	23,298	—
July 26, 2026	Tacoma	United States	Tacoma Dome	—	—
July 28, 2026	Oakland	United States	Oakland Arena	—	—
July 29, 2026	Oakland	United States	Oakland Arena	—	—
August 1, 2026	Las Vegas	United States	T-Mobile Arena	—	—
August 8, 2026	Busan	South Korea	Sajik Arena	—	—
August 9, 2026	Busan	South Korea	Sajik Arena	—	—
October 16, 2026	Macau	China	Galaxy Arena	—	—
October 17, 2026	Macau	China	Galaxy Arena	—	—
October 18, 2026	Macau	China	Galaxy Arena	—	—
December 1, 2026	Tokyo	Japan	Tokyo Dome	—	—
December 2, 2026	Tokyo	Japan	Tokyo Dome	—	—
December 26, 2026	Aichi	Japan	Vantelin Dome Nagoya	—	—
December 27, 2026	Aichi	Japan	Vantelin Dome Nagoya	—	—
January 23, 2027	Jakarta	Indonesia	Jakarta International Stadium	—	—
February 6, 2027	Fukuoka	Japan	Fukuoka Dome	—	—
February 7, 2027	Fukuoka	Japan	Fukuoka Dome	—	—
February 19, 2027	Osaka	Japan	Kyocera Dome Osaka	—	—
February 20, 2027	Osaka	Japan	Kyocera Dome Osaka	—	—
February 24, 2027	Milan	Italy	Unipol Dome	—	—
February 27, 2027	Paris	France	La Défense Arena	—	—
March 2, 2027	Amsterdam	Netherlands	Ziggo Dome	—	—
March 5, 2027	Berlin	Germany	Uber Arena	—	—
March 9, 2027	London	United Kingdom	The O2 Arena	—	—
March 14, 2027	Singapore		Singapore National Stadium	—	—
Total					

== Fanmeetings ==
Date	Event name	City	Country	Venue	Ref.
February 6, 2021	EN-Connect	Seoul	South Korea	Bluesquare Mastercard Hall; VenewLive (Note: February 7 show only)	
February 7, 2021	EN-Connect	Seoul	South Korea	Bluesquare Mastercard Hall; VenewLive	
November 19, 2021	EN-Connect: Companion	Seoul	South Korea	KBS Arena Hall; VenewLive	
November 20, 2021 (Note: Japan Edition)	EN-Connect: Companion	Seoul	South Korea	KBS Arena Hall; VenewLive	
December 3, 2022	BYS X Enhypen	Manila	Philippines	Smart Araneta Coliseum	
May 28, 2024	A Sweet Experience: Bench/Fun Meet with Enhypen	Manila	Philippines	SM Mall of Asia Arena	
December 6, 2024	Des7ined Enhypen Dunkin' Fun Meet	Manila	Philippines	Smart Araneta Coliseum	
October 3, 2026	ENDLESS DUNKIN' | ENHYPEN Fun Meet			SM Mall of Asia Arena	

== Concert participation ==
Date	Title	City	Country	Venue	Ref.
March 27, 2021	KCON	Seoul	South Korea	Private Union	
December 31, 2021	Weverse Con Festival	Seoul	South Korea	KINTEX	
May 14, 2022	Kpop Flex Festival	Frankfurt	Germany	Deutsche Bank	
August 20, 2022	KCON	Los Angeles	United States	Crypto.com Arena	
February 25, 2023	Kross Vol. 2	Tokyo	Japan	Ariake Arena	
February 26, 2023	Kross Vol. 2	Tokyo	Japan	Ariake Arena	
April 8, 2023	Music Bank World Tour	Paris	France	La Défense Arena	
April 22, 2023	We Bridge Music Festival	Las Vegas	United States	Michelob Ultra Arena	
May 14, 2023	KCON	Chiba	Japan	Makuhari Messe	
June 11, 2023	Weverse Con Festival	Seoul	South Korea	Olympic Park	
June 17, 2023	Lotte Duty Free Family Concert	Seoul	South Korea	KSPO Dome	
July 22, 2023	Kpop Lux Festival	Madrid	Spain	Estadio Metropolitano	
August 19, 2023	Summer Sonic Festival	Chiba	Japan	Makuhari Messe	
August 20, 2023	Summer Sonic Festival	Osaka	Japan	Maishima	
November 11, 2023	Hyperound K-Fest	Abu Dhabi	United Arab Emirates	Etihad Arena	
January 2, 2024	Kross Vol. 3	Nagoya	Japan	Vantelin Dome Nagoya	
January 6, 2024	38th Golden Disk Awards	Jakarta	Indonesia	Jakarta International Stadium	
January 16, 2024	Beat AX Vol.2	Yokohama	Japan	Yokohama Arena	
January 17, 2024	Beat AX Vol.2	Yokohama	Japan	Yokohama Arena	
April 13, 2024	Golden Wave	Kaohsiung	Taiwan	Kaohsiung National Stadium	
July 27, 2024	KCON	Los Angeles	United States	Crypto.com Arena	
August 10, 2024	Rock in Japan Festival	Chiba	Japan	Soga Sports Kouen	
October 12, 2024	Music Bank	Madrid	Spain	Auditorio Miguel Rios	
November 22, 2024	MAMA Awards	Osaka	Japan	Kyocera Dome Osaka	
December 20, 2024	KBS Song Festival	Goyang	South Korea	KINTEX	
January 5, 2025	39th Golden Disc Awards	Fukuoka	Japan	Mizuho PayPay Dome Fukuoka	
February 22, 2025	D Awards	Seoul	South Korea	Korea University	
March 8, 2025	Beat Ax Vol. 6	Yokohama	Japan	Yokohama Arena	
March 9, 2025	Beat Ax Vol. 6	Yokohama	Japan	Yokohama Arena	
March 22, 2025	Golden Wave	Bangkok	Thailand	Thunderdome Stadium	
April 12, 2025	Coachella 2025	Indio	United States	Empire Polo Club	
April 19, 2025	Coachella 2025	Indio	United States	Empire Polo Club	
May 3, 2025	Trend Wave Festival	Incheon	South Korea	Incheon Asiad Main Stadium	
May 28, 2025	Asia Star Entertainer Awards	Yokohama	Japan	K-Arena Yokohama	
May 31, 2025	Weverse Con	Incheon	South Korea	Inspire Arena	
September 20, 2025	The Fact Music Awards	Macau	China	Macau Outdoor Performance Arena	
October 18, 2025	Sector K Livin' Fest 2025	Jakarta	Indonesia	Nice PIK2 Hall 1-3A	
October 19, 2025	Sector K Livin' Fest 2025	Jakarta	Indonesia	Nice PIK2 Hall 1-3A	
March 14, 2026	Hello, Melbourne Music Festival	Melbourne	Australia	Flemington Racecourse	
