= List of Top Album Sales number ones of the 2020s =

Top Album Sales is a music chart published by Billboard magazine documenting the best-selling albums on a weekly basis in the United States. Up until December 2014, this had been documented by the Billboard 200 chart, but that chart was altered to account for the consumption of album-equivalent units in its tallies, in order to document the increased prominence of music streaming outlets such as Apple Music and Spotify. The Top Album Sales chart was created to preserve the older methodology of counting pure album sales.

== List of number-one albums ==
Key
†	Indicates the best-selling album of each year

=== 2020 ===
Issue date	Album	Artist(s)	Pure sales	Ref.
January 4	Fine Line	Harry Styles	47,000	
January 11	JackBoys	JackBoys	79,000	
January 18	Fine Line	Harry Styles	—N/a	
January 25	Rare	Selena Gomez	53,000	
February 1	Manic	Halsey	180,000	
February 8	When We All Fall Asleep, Where Do We Go?	Billie Eilish	—N/a	
February 15	Shake the Snow Globe	Russ	39,000	
February 22	Father of All	Green Day	42,000	
February 29	Changes	Justin Bieber	126,000	
March 7	Map of the Soul: 7	BTS	347,000	
March 14	American Standard	James Taylor	81,000	
March 21	Neo Zone	NCT 127	83,000	
March 28	Heartbreak Weather	Niall Horan	42,000	
April 4	After Hours	The Weeknd	275,000	
April 11	Calm	5 Seconds of Summer	113,000	
April 18	After Hours	The Weeknd	23,000	
April 25	The New Abnormal	The Strokes	23,000	
May 2	Fetch the Bolt Cutters	Fiona Apple	30,000	
May 9	Afterburner	Dance Gavin Dance	—N/a	
May 16	Here and Now	Kenny Chesney	222,000	
May 23	Good Intentions	Nav	73,000	
May 30	Reunions	Jason Isbell and The 400 Unit	—N/a	
June 6	Notes on a Conditional Form	The 1975	39,000	
June 13	Chromatica	Lady Gaga	205,000	
June 20	Chromatica	Lady Gaga	—N/a	
June 27	Neo Zone	NCT 127	—N/a	
July 4	Rough and Rowdy Ways	Bob Dylan	51,000	
July 11	Women in Music, Pt. III	Haim	—N/a	
July 18	Shoot for the Stars, Aim for the Moon	Pop Smoke	59,000	
July 25	Legends Never Die	Juice Wrld	209,000	
August 1	Gaslighter	The Chicks	71,000	
August 8	Folklore †	Taylor Swift	615,000	
August 15	Folklore †	Taylor Swift	30,000	
August 22	Folklore †	Taylor Swift	67,000	
August 29	Folklore †	Taylor Swift	46,000	
September 5	Folklore †	Taylor Swift	52,000	
September 12	S&M2	Metallica and the San Francisco Symphony	53,000	
September 19	TattleTales	6ix9ine	32,000	
September 26	We Are Chaos	Marilyn Manson	28,000	
October 3	Folklore †	Taylor Swift	56,000	
October 10	Super One	SuperM	101,000	
October 17	The Album	Blackpink	81,000	
October 24	The Album	Blackpink	19,000	
October 31	Folklore †	Taylor Swift	57,000	
November 7	Letter to You	Bruce Springsteen	92,000	
November 14	Positions	Ariana Grande	42,000	
November 21	Minisode1: Blue Hour	Tomorrow X Together	—N/a	
November 28	Power Up	AC/DC	111,000	
December 5	Be	BTS	177,000	
December 12	Be	BTS	—N/a	
December 19	Wonder	Shawn Mendes	54,000	
December 26	Evermore	Taylor Swift	154,000	

=== 2021 ===
Issue date	Album	Artist(s)	Pure sales	Ref.
January 2	McCartney III	Paul McCartney	104,000	
January 9	Evermore	Taylor Swift	—N/a	
January 16	Evermore	Taylor Swift	16,000	
January 23	Dangerous: The Double Album	Morgan Wallen	74,000	
January 30	The Good Times and the Bad Ones	Why Don't We	38,000	
February 6	Dangerous: The Double Album	Morgan Wallen	12,000	
February 13	Dangerous: The Double Album	Morgan Wallen	25,000	
February 20	Medicine at Midnight	Foo Fighters	64,000	
February 27	Death by Rock and Roll	The Pretty Reckless	16,000	
March 6	Be	BTS	28,000	
March 13	Detroit Stories	Alice Cooper	13,000	
March 20	Niratias	Chevelle	24,000	
March 27	The Lunar Injection Kool Aid Eclipse Conspiracy	Rob Zombie	26,000	
April 3	Chemtrails Over the Country Club	Lana Del Rey	58,000	
April 10	My Savior	Carrie Underwood	68,000	
April 17	Dancing with the Devil... the Art of Starting Over	Demi Lovato	38,000	
April 24	Fearless (Taylor's Version)	Taylor Swift	179,000	
May 1	Heart	Eric Church	40,000	
May 8	Soul	Eric Church	42,000	
May 15	Fortitude	Gojira	24,000	
May 22	Van Weezer	Weezer	—N/a	
May 29	The Off-Season	J. Cole	37,000	
June 5	Sour	Olivia Rodrigo	72,000	
June 12	Evermore	Taylor Swift	192,000	
June 19	The Chaos Chapter: Freeze	Tomorrow X Together	39,000	
June 26	Taste of Love	Twice	43,000	
July 3	Your Choice	Seventeen	—N/a	
July 10	Call Me If You Get Lost	Tyler, the Creator	55,000	
July 17	Sour	Olivia Rodrigo	—N/a	
July 24	Sour	Olivia Rodrigo	—N/a	
July 31	Sob Rock	John Mayer	61,000	
August 7	McCartney III Imagined	Paul McCartney	—N/a	
August 14	Happier Than Ever	Billie Eilish	154,000	
August 21	Happier Than Ever	Billie Eilish	36,000	
August 28	Happier Than Ever	Billie Eilish	23,000	
September 4	Sour	Olivia Rodrigo	84,000	
September 11	If I Can't Have Love, I Want Power	Halsey	71,000	
September 18	Senjutsu	Iron Maiden	61,000	
September 25	Star-Crossed	Kacey Musgraves	47,000	
October 2	Sticker	NCT 127	58,000	
October 9	Crazy in Love	Itzy	22,000	
October 16	Fearless (Taylor's Version)	Taylor Swift	146,000	
October 23	Life of a Don	Don Toliver	18,000	
October 30	Let It Be: 50th Anniversary Edition	The Beatles	48,000	
November 6	Attacca	Seventeen	—N/a	
November 13	= (Equals)	Ed Sheeran	68,000	
November 20	Voyage	ABBA	78,000	
November 27	Red (Taylor's Version)	Taylor Swift	369,000	
December 4	30 †	Adele	692,000	
December 11	30 †	Adele	225,000	
December 18	30 †	Adele	149,000	
December 25	30 †	Adele	147,000	

=== 2022 ===
Issue date	Album	Artist(s)	Pure sales	Ref.
January 1	30	Adele	181,000	
January 8	30	Adele	72,000	
January 15	30	Adele	—N/a	
January 22	30	Adele	—N/a	
January 29	Brightside	The Lumineers	26,000	
February 5	Encanto	Soundtrack	19,000	
February 12	Dawn FM	The Weeknd	14,000	
February 19	Laurel Hell	Mitski	24,000	
February 26	Earthling	Eddie Vedder	—N/a	
March 5	Once Twice Melody	Beach House	20,300	
March 12	The Tipping Point	Tears for Fears	29,000	
March 19	The Brave	Tom MacDonald and Adam Calhoun	—N/a	
March 26	Impera	Ghost	63,000	
April 2	Oddinary	Stray Kids	103,000	
April 9	Mainstream Sellout	Machine Gun Kelly	42,000	
April 16	Unlimited Love	Red Hot Chili Peppers	83,000	
April 23	Fear of the Dawn	Jack White	39,000	
April 30	Call Me If You Get Lost	Tyler, the Creator	51,000	
May 7	Kauai	Childish Gambino	16,000	
May 14	Dawn FM	The Weeknd	44,000	
May 21	We	Arcade Fire	27,000	
May 28	Minisode 2: Thursday's Child	Tomorrow X Together	66,000	
June 4	Harry's House	Harry Styles	330,000	
June 11	Harry's House	Harry Styles	57,000	
June 18	Face the Sun	Seventeen	42,000	
June 25	Proof	BTS	266,000	
July 2	Proof	BTS	—N/a	
July 9	Im Nayeon	Nayeon	52,000	
July 16	Planet Zero	Shinedown	43,000	
July 23	Girls	Aespa	53,000	
July 30	Special	Lizzo	39,000	
August 6	Sector 17	Seventeen	31,000	
August 13	Renaissance	Beyoncé	190,000	
August 20	Curtain Call 2	Eminem	18,000	
August 27	Manifesto: Day 1	Enhypen	—N/a	
September 3	Finally Enough Love: 50 Number Ones	Madonna	28,000	
September 10	Between 1&2	Twice	94,000	
September 17	The Sick, the Dying... and the Dead!	Megadeth	45,000	
September 24	Patient Number 9	Ozzy Osbourne	53,000	
October 1	Born Pink	Blackpink	76,000	
October 8	5SOS5	5 Seconds of Summer	36,000	
October 15	The End, So Far	Slipknot	51,000	
October 22	Maxident	Stray Kids	110,000	
October 29	Return of the Dream Canteen	Red Hot Chili Peppers	56,000	
November 5	Midnights †	Taylor Swift	1,140,000	
November 12	Midnights †	Taylor Swift	114,000	
November 19	Midnights †	Taylor Swift	—N/a	
November 26	Midnights †	Taylor Swift	60,000	
December 3	Midnights †	Taylor Swift	57,000	
December 10	Midnights †	Taylor Swift	60,000	
December 17	Midnights †	Taylor Swift	—N/a	
December 24	Midnights †	Taylor Swift	—N/a	
December 31	Midnights †	Taylor Swift	97,000	

=== 2023 ===
Issue date	Album	Artist(s)	Pure sales	Ref.
January 7	Midnights	Taylor Swift	—N/a	
January 14	Midnights	Taylor Swift	58,000	
January 21	Midnights	Taylor Swift	25,000	
January 28	Midnights	Taylor Swift	—N/a	
February 4	The Mockingbird & the Crow	Hardy	20,000	
February 11	The Name Chapter: Temptation	Tomorrow X Together	152,000	
February 18	The Name Chapter: Temptation	Tomorrow X Together	43,000	
February 25	This Is Why	Paramore	47,000	
March 4	Trustfall	P!nk	59,000	
March 11	Cracker Island	Gorillaz	49,000	
March 18	One Thing at a Time	Morgan Wallen	112,000	
March 25	Ready to Be	Twice	146,000	
April 1	Songs of Surrender	U2	42,000	
April 8	Face	Jimin	124,000	
April 15	Portals	Melanie Martinez	99,000	
April 22	Hope	NF	81,000	
April 29	72 Seasons	Metallica	134,000	
May 6	D-Day	Agust D	122,000	
May 13	FML	Seventeen	132,000	
May 20	(Subtract)	Ed Sheeran	81,000	
May 27	The Album	Jonas Brothers	36,000	
June 3	Walk Around the Moon	Dave Matthews Band	40,000	
June 10	Midnights	Taylor Swift	196,000	
June 17	5-Star	Stray Kids	235,000	
June 24	The Show	Niall Horan	68,000	
July 1	The World EP.2: Outlaw	Ateez	101,000	
July 8	Chemistry	Kelly Clarkson	43,000	
July 15	My World	Aespa	39,000	
July 22	Speak Now (Taylor's Version)	Taylor Swift	507,000	
July 29	Speak Now (Taylor's Version)	Taylor Swift	47,000	
August 5	Get Up	NewJeans	102,000	
August 12	Utopia	Travis Scott	252,000	
August 19	Utopia	Travis Scott	37,000	
August 26	Utopia	Travis Scott	99,000	
September 2	Utopia	Travis Scott	92,000	
September 9	Call Me If You Get Lost	Tyler, the Creator	29,000	
September 16	Songs You Know by Heart	Jimmy Buffett	16,000	
September 23	Guts	Olivia Rodrigo	150,000	
September 30	Guts	Olivia Rodrigo	44,000	
October 7	Guts	Olivia Rodrigo	23,000	
October 14	Autumn Variations	Ed Sheeran	46,500	
October 21	Fact Check	NCT 127	29,000	
October 28	The Name Chapter: Freefall	Tomorrow X Together	106,000	
November 4	One More Time...	Blink-182	101,000	
November 11	1989 (Taylor's Version) †	Taylor Swift	1,359,000	
November 18	Golden	Jungkook	164,800	
November 25	Rock-Star	Stray Kids	213,000	
December 2	Rockstar	Dolly Parton	118,500	
December 9	1989 (Taylor's Version) †	Taylor Swift	—N/a	
December 16	The World EP.Fin: Will	Ateez	146,000	
December 23	Pink Friday 2	Nicki Minaj	92,000	
December 30	1989 (Taylor's Version) †	Taylor Swift	95,000	

=== 2024 ===
Issue date	Album	Artist(s)	Pure sales	Ref.
January 6	1989 (Taylor's Version)	Taylor Swift	—N/a	
January 13	1989 (Taylor's Version)	Taylor Swift	—N/a	
January 20	1989 (Taylor's Version)	Taylor Swift	17,000	
January 27	Orquídeas	Kali Uchis	31,000	
February 3	Saviors	Green Day	39,000	
February 10	Dave's Picks Volume 49	Grateful Dead	21,000	
February 17	1989 (Taylor's Version)	Taylor Swift	12,000	
February 24	Coming Home	Usher	53,000	
March 2	This Is Me... Now	Jennifer Lopez	14,000	
March 9	With You-th	Twice	90,000	
March 16	With You-th	Twice	17,000	
March 23	Eternal Sunshine	Ariana Grande	77,000	
March 30	Deeper Well	Kacey Musgraves	66,000	
April 6	Born	Kenny Chesney	18,500	
April 13	Cowboy Carter	Beyoncé	168,000	
April 20	Minisode 3: Tomorrow	Tomorrow X Together	103,500	
April 27	Cowboy Carter	Beyoncé	—N/a	
May 4	The Tortured Poets Department †	Taylor Swift	1,914,000	
May 11	The Tortured Poets Department †	Taylor Swift	107,000	
May 18	Radical Optimism	Dua Lipa	51,500	
May 25	The Tortured Poets Department †	Taylor Swift	41,000	
June 1	The Tortured Poets Department †	Taylor Swift	210,000	
June 8	Clancy	Twenty One Pilots	113,000	
June 15	Golden Hour: Part.1	Ateez	127,000	
June 22	Forever	Bon Jovi	50,000	
June 29	Na	Nayeon	43,000	
July 6	The Secret of Us	Gracie Abrams	50,000	
July 13	The Tortured Poets Department †	Taylor Swift	35,000	
July 20	The Tortured Poets Department †	Taylor Swift	90,000	
July 27	Romance: Untold	Enhypen	117,000	
August 3	Ate	Stray Kids	218,000	
August 10	Ate	Stray Kids	48,000	
August 17	The Tortured Poets Department †	Taylor Swift	84,000	
August 24	The Tortured Poets Department †	Taylor Swift	28,000	
August 31	F-1 Trillion	Post Malone	80,000	
September 7	Days Before Rodeo	Travis Scott	331,000	
September 14	Crazy	Le Sserafim	38,000	
September 21	Luck and Strange	David Gilmour	30,000	
September 28	Days Before Rodeo	Travis Scott	150,000	
October 5	The Rise and Fall of a Midwest Princess	Chappell Roan	56,000	
October 12	Highway Prayers	Billy Strings	19,000	
October 19	Moon Music	Coldplay	106,000	
October 26	Beautifully Broken	Jelly Roll	114,000	
November 2	Spill the Feels	Seventeen	64,000	
November 9	Chromakopia	Tyler, the Creator	142,000	
November 16	Songs of a Lost World	The Cure	53,000	
November 23	The Star Chapter: Sanctuary	Tomorrow X Together	95,500	
November 30	Golden Hour: Part.2	Ateez	179,000	
December 7	Wicked: The Soundtrack	Cynthia Erivo, Ariana Grande & various artists	85,000	
December 14	The Tortured Poets Department †	Taylor Swift	368,000	
December 21	The Tortured Poets Department †	Taylor Swift	201,000	
December 28	Hop	Stray Kids	176,000	

=== 2025 ===
Issue date	Album	Artist(s)	Pure sales	Ref.
January 4	Hop	Stray Kids	—N/a	
January 11	Hop	Stray Kids	27,000	
January 18	WHAM	Lil Baby	50,000	
January 25	Lover (Live from Paris)	Taylor Swift	202,500	
February 1	Balloonerism	Mac Miller	41,000	
February 8	I've Tried Everything but Therapy (Part 2)	Teddy Swims	26,000	
February 15	Hurry Up Tomorrow	The Weeknd	359,000	
February 22	GNX	Kendrick Lamar	116,000	
March 1	Short n' Sweet	Sabrina Carpenter	71,000	
March 8	So Close to What	Tate McRae	71,000	
March 15	Alter Ego	Lisa	28,000	
March 22	Mayhem	Lady Gaga	136,000	
March 29	Hot	Le Sserafim	38,500	
April 5	I Said I Love You First	Selena Gomez and Benny Blanco	71,000	
April 12	Eternal Sunshine	Ariana Grande	61,000	
April 19	Preacher's Daughter	Ethel Cain	37,000	
April 26	Sable, Fable	Bon Iver	25,000	
May 3	Alligator Bites Never Heal	Doechii	14,000	
May 10	Skeletá	Ghost	77,000	
May 17	Debí Tirar Más Fotos	Bad Bunny	48,000	
May 24	Even in Arcadia	Sleep Token	73,500	
May 31	I'm the Problem	Morgan Wallen	133,000	
June 7	I'm the Problem	Morgan Wallen	28,000	
June 14	Happy Burstday	Seventeen	46,000	
June 21	Desire: Unleash	Enhypen	95,000	
June 28	Golden Hour: Part.3	Ateez	101,500	
July 5	American Heart	Benson Boone	30,000	
July 12	Virgin	Lorde	42,000	
July 19	. (Period)	Kesha	15,500	
July 26	JackBoys 2	JackBoys and Travis Scott	160,000	
August 2	Don't Tap the Glass	Tyler, the Creator	128,000	
August 9	The Star Chapter: Together	Tomorrow X Together	62,000	
August 16	Bite Me	Reneé Rapp	47,000	
August 23	Lost Americana	MGK	40,500	
August 30	Wishbone	Conan Gray	53,000	
September 6	Karma	Stray Kids	296,000	
September 13	Man's Best Friend	Sabrina Carpenter	224,000	
September 20	Man's Best Friend	Sabrina Carpenter	—N/a	
September 27	Breach	Twenty One Pilots	169,000	
October 4	Am I the Drama?	Cardi B	88,000	
October 11	Here for It All	Mariah Carey	39,000	
October 18	The Life of a Showgirl †	Taylor Swift	3,479,500	
October 25	The Life of a Showgirl †	Taylor Swift	101,000	
November 1	The Life of a Showgirl †	Taylor Swift	38,000	
November 8	Returning to Myself	Brandi Carlile	32,000	
November 15	Everybody Scream	Florence and the Machine	44,000	
November 22	No Labels: Part 01	Yeonjun	27,000	
November 29	Fear	NF	48,000	
December 6	Do It	Stray Kids	286,000	
December 13	Do It	Stray Kids	—N/a	
December 20	The Life of a Showgirl †	Taylor Swift	39,000	
December 27	The Life of a Showgirl †	Taylor Swift	55,000	

=== 2026 ===
Issue date	Album	Artist(s)	Pure sales	Ref.
January 3	The Life of a Showgirl	Taylor Swift	97,000	
January 10	The Life of a Showgirl	Taylor Swift	33,000	
January 17	The Life of a Showgirl	Taylor Swift	—N/a	
January 24	Before I Forget	The Kid Laroi	11,000	
January 31	The Sin: Vanish	Enhypen	113,000	
February 7	Megadeth	Megadeth	69,000	
February 14	Octane	Don Toliver	31,000	
February 21	Golden Hour: Part.4	Ateez	195,000	
February 28	Debí Tirar Más Fotos	Bad Bunny	28,000	
March 7	Cloud 9	Megan Moroney	78,000	
March 14	The Romantic	Bruno Mars	93,500	
March 21	Kiss All the Time. Disco, Occasionally	Harry Styles	291,000	
March 28	Mutiny After Midnight	Johnny Blue Skies and the Dark Clouds	59,000	
April 4	Arirang	BTS	532,000	
April 11	Arirang	BTS	114,000	
April 18	Arirang	BTS	71,000	
April 25	Dandelion	Ella Langley	39,000	
May 2	7th Year: A Moment of Stillness in the Thorns	Tomorrow X Together	67,000	
May 9	The Great Divide	Noah Kahan	175,000	
May 16	Middle of Nowhere	Kacey Musgraves	64,500	
May 23	GreenGreen	Cortis	81,500	
May 30	GreenGreen	Cortis	—N/a	
June 6	Pureflow Pt. 1	Le Sserafim	34,000	
June 13	The Boys of Dungeon Lane	Paul McCartney	59,500	
June 20	Dinner Party	Niall Horan	48,000	
June 27	You Seem Pretty Sad for a Girl So in Love	Olivia Rodrigo	273,000	
July 4	You Seem Pretty Sad for a Girl So in Love	Olivia Rodrigo	47,500	
July 11	Golden Hour: Part.5	Ateez	223,000	
July 18	Confessions II	Madonna	114,000	
July 25	Foreign Tongues	The Rolling Stones	48,500	
August 1	Daughter from Hell	Gracie Abrams	77,000	
August 8	Music, Fashion, Film	Charli XCX	57,000	
August 15	Petal	Ariana Grande	168,000	
August 22	This & That	Stray Kids	357,000	
August 29	Wild	Katseye	145,000	
September 5	The Sin: Bliss	Enhypen	92,000	
September 12	Wildchild	Alex Warren	55,000	
September 19	Prima	Adéla	31,000	
September 26	This & That	Stray Kids	—N/a	
October 3	Bass Persuades	Miley Cyrus	47,000	
October 10	Silver Sands Marina	Kenny Chesney	30,000	
October 17	Rubber Soul	The Beatles	50,000	
October 24	The Life of a Showgirl	Taylor Swift	37,000	
October 31	Hyperdrive	Plave	—N/a	
November 7	The Black Parade	My Chemical Romance	68,000	
November 14	Break Even	Illit	32,500	
November 21	Blow Up	P1Harmony	43,500	
November 28	Golden Hour: Part.6	Ateez	191,000	
