= Bloody Paradise =

Single by Enhypen

from the EP The Sin: Bliss
- Language: Korean
- Released: August 21, 2026
- Recorded: 2026
- Genre: K-pop; Brazilian funk
- Length: 2:11
- Label: Belift Lab
- Songwriters: Ryan Curtis; Kalvin Beal; Benjamin Falik; Gaeko
- Producer: Julia Lewis

Enhypen singles chronology
"We'll Be Fine" (2026)	"Bloody Paradise" (2026)	"I Want You" (2026)

Music video
- Bloody Paradise on YouTube

"Bloody Paradise" is a song recorded by South Korean boy band Enhypen for their eighth extended play (EP) The Sin: Bliss. It was released as the EP's lead single by Belift Lab on August 21, 2026.

== Background ==
On June 18, 2026, it was reported that Enhypen would release their first album as a six-member group, following the departure of Heeseung, in August. The following day, it was confirmed that the group would release their eighth extended play, The Sin: Bliss, as the second installment in their The Sin series, following The Sin: Vanish.

On July 4, a preview of the EP's lead single "Bloody Paradise" was first revealed during the group's concert in Brazil as part of their Blood Saga Tour. The group later performed the full song at their Busan concerts ahead of the album's release.

The album was released on August 21, 2026, with an accompanying music video for "Bloody Paradise", which was filmed in Peru.

== Composition ==
"Bloody Paradise" is described as a Brazilian funk dance song. Individual member remixes of the track were released on August 24, 2026, combining the song with genres ranging from mariachi to hip-hop. An English version featuring Brazilian singer-songwriter Luísa Sonza was released on August 26, 2026.

== Accolades ==
On South Korean music programs, "Bloody Paradise" won seven first-place awards and became the group's first "Grand Slam", winning on all five major music shows. On September 10, the song achieved a Triple Crown on M Countdown, winning three consecutive times on the show.

Music program awards for "Bloody Paradise"
Program	Date	Ref.
Show Champion	August 26, 2026	
M Countdown	August 27, 2026	
M Countdown	September 3, 2026	
M Countdown	September 10, 2026	
Music Bank	August 28, 2026	
Show! Music Core	August 29, 2026	
Inkigayo	August 30, 2026	

== Track listing ==
Digital download and streaming – English version

1. "Bloody Paradise" (English version, featuring Luísa Sonza) – 2:12
2. "Bloody Paradise" (English version) – 2:12

== Charts ==
Chart (2026)	Peak position
Global 200 (Billboard)	32
Japan Combined Singles (Oricon)	46
Japan Hot 100 (Billboard)	32
Malaysia (IFPI)	16
Nicaragua Anglo Airplay (Monitor Latino)	5
Peru Anglo Airplay (Monitor Latino)	19
Peru Streaming (Promúsica)	19
Philippines Hot 100 (Billboard Philippines)	2
Singapore (RIAS)	2
South Korea (Circle)	15
Thailand (Billboard)	10
Taiwan (Billboard)	25
US Bubbling Under Hot 100 (Billboard)	23
