= Brought the Heat Back =

- Ava Max remix cover

Promotional single by Enhypen

from the album Romance: Untold
- Language: English; Korean
- Released: August 9, 2024
- Recorded: 2024
- Genre: Funk; dance-pop
- Length: 2:56
- Songwriters: JHart; Jesse Saint John; Cirkut; Yu Bin Hwang; Danke; "Hitman" Bang; Inverness
- Producer: Cirkut

Music video
- "Brought the Heat Back" on YouTube

"Brought the Heat Back" is a song by South Korean band Enhypen. A remix with American singer Ava Max was released on August 9, 2024. Musically, the song blends funk with dance-pop.

== Background and release ==
"Brought the Heat Back" is the fifth track on Enhypen's second album, Romance: Untold, released on July 12, 2024. The song was primarily written and produced by Canadian producer-songwriter Cirkut. The song blends funk and dance-pop.

On August 7, 2024, the remix single was announced with its cover art and release date. On August 10, 2024, the day after the single was released, Max revealed the song was originally made for her but given to Enhypen.

This song encompasses the narrator's strong feeling of jealousy. The narrator blames their partner for making them feel that way, and every second passing by makes the narrator feel more intense jealousy and madness, despite it being the first time they felt that emotion.

== Music video ==
The music video for "Brought the Heat Back" finds Enhypen back with a comedic take on their vampire concept, in contrast to their usual darker visuals, with a loose plotline about chasing a cat that has somehow transformed into a coffin. The boy band get knocked down by cars, trapped in elevators, and attacked by flying fish.

== Charts ==
Chart performance for "Brought the Heat Back"
Chart (2024)	Peak position
South Korea (Circle)	172
US World Digital Song Sales (Billboard)	8

Chart performance for "Brought the Heat Back" (with Ava Max)
Chart (2024)	Peak position
South Korea BGM (Circle)	103
South Korea Download (Circle)	197
