= Sadame =

2022 studio album by Enhypen

- Digital and Regular version cover

Studio album by Enhypen
- Released: October 26, 2022
- Recorded: 2022
- Genres: J-pop; hip-hop
- Length: 28:22
- Languages: Japanese; English
- Labels: Belift Lab; Virgin; YG Plus
- Producers: Frants; Freedo; "Hitman" Bang; Mitsu.J; Ryo Ito; Shinkung; Uta; Wonderkid

Enhypen chronology
Manifesto: Day 1 (2022)	Sadame (2022)	Dark Blood (2023)

Singles from Sadame
- 1. "Border: Hakanai" Released: July 6, 2021; 2. "Dimension: Senkō" Released: May 3, 2022; 3. "Make the Change" Released: October 11, 2022

Sadame (定め; lit. "Destiny") is the debut Japanese and second studio album by South Korean boy band Enhypen. It was released on October 26, 2022, through Virgin Music. The album consists of nine tracks, including the Japanese versions of "Blessed-Cursed" and "Future Perfect (Pass the Mic)".

== Background and release ==
In August 2022, Belift Lab confirmed that Enhypen would release their first Japanese studio album in October. Titled Sadame, the album was released on October 26, through Universal Music Japan. It contained nine tracks, including the original Japanese songs "Always" and "Forget Me Not" and the Japanese versions of "Blessed-Cursed" and "Future Perfect (Pass the Mic)", as well as "Polaroid Love" as a CD-only bonus track. The album also featured the new Japanese song "Make the Change", the theme for the second season of the Tokai TV and Fuji TV Japanese drama Saikou no Obahan Nakajima Haruko, which began airing on October 8; the song was digitally pre-released on October 12.

== Commercial performance ==
On the first day of its release, Sadame sold 183,373 copies and placed first on Oricon's Daily Album Ranking.

== Track listing ==
Sadame track listing
No.	Title	Writer(s)	Producer(s)	Length
1.	"Future Perfect (Pass the Mic)" (Japanese version)	Wonderkid; "Hitman" Bang; Supreme Boi; Jacob Aaron (The Hub); The Hub 88; Zopp	Wonderkid; "Hitman" Bang	3:00
2.	"Blessed-Cursed" (Japanese version)	"Hitman" Bang; Alexander Karlsson; Charlotte Wilson; Ciara Muscat; Frants; Gabriel Brandes; Jacob Aaron; Lil 27 Club; Moa "Cazzi Opeia" Carlebecker; Ronnie Icon; Softserveboy; Sqvare; Tim Tan; Wonderkid; Worawat Deeudomchan; Shinkung; Barbora	"Hitman" Bang; Wonderkid; Shinkung	2:52
3.	"Make the Change"	Uta; Yo-Hei; D&H	Uta	3:07
4.	"Tamed-Dashed" (Japanese version)	"Hitman" Bang; Wonderkid; Lil 27 Club; Caesar & Loui; Moa "Cazzi Opeia" Carlebecker; Alexander Karlsson; Tim Tan; Ciara Muscat; Sam Klempner; Softserveboy; Carly Lyman; Barbora	"Hitman" Bang; Wonderkid	3:16
5.	"Drunk-Dazed" (Japanese version)	Wonderkid; Lil 27 Club; "Hitman" Bang; Melanie Joy Fontana; Michel "Lindgren" Schulz; Zopp	Wonderkid; "Hitman" Bang	3:14
6.	"Given-Taken" (Japanese version)	Wonderkid; Lil 27 Club; "Hitman" Bang; Melanie Joy Fontana; Andreas Carlsson; Michel "Lindgren" Schulz; Moa "Cazzi Opeia" Carlebecker (Sunshine); Ellen Berg (Sunshine); Kyler Niko; Zopp	Wonderkid; "Hitman" Bang	3:04
7.	"Always"	Mitsu.J; Zopp	Mitsu.J	3:08
8.	"Let Me In (20 Cube)" (Japanese version)	Frants; Kyler Niko; "Hitman" Bang; Lee Yi-jin; January 8th; Lee Seu-ran; Danke (Lalala Studio); Lutra; Cho Yu-ri (Jam Factory); Barbora	Frants; "Hitman" Bang	3:11
9.	"Forget Me Not"	Barbora; The Answer; Ryo Ito	Ryo Ito	3:25
Total length:				28:22

Sadame CD
No.	Title	Writer(s)	Producer(s)	Length
10.	"Polaroid Love"	"Hitman" Bang; January 8th; Danke (Lalala Studio); Enzo; Fridolin Walcher; Johnny Hockings; Ryan Bickley	Freedo	3:04
Total length:				31:26

== Charts ==
=== Weekly charts ===
Weekly chart performance for Sadame
Chart (2022–2023)	Peak position
Belgian Albums (Ultratop Wallonia)	114
Croatian International Albums (HDU)	10
French Albums (SNEP)	160
Hungarian Albums (MAHASZ)	19
Japanese Albums (Oricon)	1
Japanese Combined Albums (Oricon)	1
Japanese Hot Albums (Billboard Japan)	1
Swiss Albums (Schweizer Hitparade)	79
US World Albums (Billboard)	5

=== Monthly charts ===
Monthly chart performance for Sadame
Chart (2022)	Peak position
Japanese Albums (Oricon)	2

=== Year-end charts ===
Year-end chart performance for Sadame
Chart (2022)	Position
Japanese Albums (Oricon)	13
Japanese Hot Albums (Billboard Japan)	17

== Certifications and sales ==
Certifications for Sadame
Region	Certification	Certified units/sales
Japan (RIAJ)	Platinum	250,000^{^}
^{^} Shipments figures based on certification alone.

== Release history ==
Release formats for Sadame
Region	Date	Format	Label
Various	October 26, 2022	CD; DVD; digital download; streaming	Universal Japan
