= The Sin: Bliss =

- Digital cover

EP by Enhypen
- Released: August 21, 2026
- Genre: K-pop
- Length: 15:56
- Languages: Korean; English
- Label: Belift Lab
- Producers: Armadillo; Sean Cook; Sean Momberger; Cooper Folden; Julia Lewis; "Hitman" Bang; Dwilly; Wiljam; Pink Slip; Ca$hcow

Enhypen chronology
The Sin: Vanish (2026)	The Sin: Bliss (2026)

Singles from The Sin: Bliss
- 1. "Bloody Paradise" Released: August 21, 2026; 2. "Checkmate" Released: September 11, 2026

The Sin: Bliss is the ninth extended play (EP) by South Korean boy band Enhypen. (Note: Belift Lab counts The Sin: Bliss as Enhypen's eighth extended play.) It was released on August 21, 2026, through Belift Lab. The EP consists of ten tracks, including its lead single "Bloody Paradise". It marks the group's first release as a six-member ensemble, following the departure of Heeseung.

== Background ==
On June 18, 2026, it was reported that Enhypen would release their first album as a six-member group in August. The following day, it was confirmed that the group would release their eighth extended play, The Sin: Bliss, on August 21, 2026, as the second record in their The Sin series, following The Sin: Vanish.

On July 4, a preview of the EP's lead single "Bloody Paradise", described as a Brazilian funk song, was first revealed during the group's concert in Brazil as part of their Blood Saga Tour. The group later performed the full song at their Busan concerts ahead of the album's release.

On July 5, the promotion calendar for the EP was uploaded on YouTube. Pre-orders for the EP opened on July 13, with the track list revealed the next day. On July 26, 2026, the album's official highlight medley was released. The album was released on August 21, 2026, with an accompanying music video for "Bloody Paradise".

== Track listing ==
The Sin: Bliss main digital edition track listing
No.	Title	Writer(s)	Producer(s)	Length
1.	"Two Fools"	Randy Class; Maya J'an B; Dan Pellarin; Sean Cook; Sean Momberger; Cooper Folden; Kang Eun-yu; Kim Su-ji (Lalala Studio); Chef (PNP); Belift Lab; Mia (153/Joombas); Jeongseon (Artiffect); Benley (Up); Junji (Lalala Studio)	Sean Cook; Sean Momberger; Cooper Folden	2:22
2.	"Stuck"	Ryan Curtis; Kalvin Beal; Benjamin Falik; Kim Su-ji (Lalala Studio); "Hitman" Bang; Kim Sae-byeol (XYXX); Kim Bo-eun (Jam Factory); Na Yun-jeong (Lalala Studio); Kang Eun-jung; Bang Hye-hyun	Julia Lewis; "Hitman" Bang	2:32
3.	"Bad for You"	Anthony Watts; Pink Slip; David Charles Fisher; Armadillo; Gyeong Seung-wan; Stella Jang; SSAC (MUMW); Jang Seung-min (Lalala Studio); Belift Lab; Park Tae-won; Park Sang-yu (153/Joombas); Peridot	Armadillo	3:15
4.	"Bloody Paradise"	Ryan Curtis; Kalvin Beal; Benjamin Falik; Gaeko	Julia Lewis	2:11
5.	"Checkmate"	Wiljam; David Wilson; Armadillo; Connie; Kim Su-ji (Lalala Studio); Belift Lab; Beom Eun-hyeon (XYXX); Jonjon (XYXX); Jang Hyung-jun (XYXX); Kim Sung-kyung (XYXX); Benley (Up); Jeon Yuli (153/Joombas); Deepflow (Up); Park Tae-won; Kim Chae-ah (153/Joombas); Lee Aeng-du; Shin Sa-kang (XYXX)	Armadillo; Dwilly; Wiljam	2:23
6.	"Highlight"	Anthony Watts; Benjamin Falik; Pink Slip; Belift Lab; Bae Hae (Lalala Studio); Ninetysixunderbar; Ellie Suh; Na Yun-jeong; Mary Jane (Lalala Studio); Mia; Bay (153/Joombas)	Julia Lewis; Pink Slip	3:13
Total length:				15:56

The Sin: Bliss with interludes track listing
No.	Title	Writer(s)	Producer(s)	Length
1.	"Two Fools"	Randy Class; Maya J'an B; Dan Pellarin; Sean Cook; Sean Momberger; Cooper Folden; Kang Eun-yu; Kim Su-ji (Lalala Studio); Chef (PNP); Belift Lab; Mia (153/Joombas); Jeongseon (Artiffect); Benley (Up); Junji (Lalala Studio)	Sean Cook; Sean Momberger; Cooper Folden	2:22
2.	"Breaking News" (속보)	Armadillo; Ranga; Kim Su-ji (Lalala Studio)	Armadillo; Ranga	0:49
3.	"Stuck"	Ryan Curtis; Kalvin Beal; Benjamin Falik; Kim Su-ji (Lalala Studio); "Hitman" Bang; Kim Sae-byeol (XYXX); Kim Bo-eun (Jam Factory); Na Yun-jeong (Lalala Studio); Kang Eun-jung; Bang Hye-hyun	Julia Lewis; "Hitman" Bang	2:32
4.	"Bad for You"	Anthony Watts; Pink Slip; David Charles Fisher; Armadillo; Gyeong Seung-wan; Stella Jang; SSAC (MUMW); Jang Seung-min (Lalala Studio); Belift Lab; Park Tae-won; Park Sang-yu (153/Joombas); Peridot	Armadillo	3:15
5.	"Remnants of Love" (사랑의 잔해)	Kim Su-ji (Lalala Studio); Armadillo; Ca$hcow	Armadillo; Ca$hcow	1:27
6.	"Bloody Paradise"	Ryan Curtis; Kalvin Beal; Benjamin Falik; Gaeko	Julia Lewis	2:11
7.	"The Final Moment" (최후의 순간)	Kim Su-ji (Lalala Studio); Armadillo; Ca$hcow	Armadillo; Ca$hcow	1:18
8.	"Checkmate"	Wiljam; David Wilson; Armadillo; Connie; Kim Su-ji (Lalala Studio); Belift Lab; Beom Eun-hyeon (XYXX); Jonjon (XYXX); Jang Hyung-jun (XYXX); Kim Sung-kyung (XYXX); Benley (Up); Jeon Yuli (153/Joombas); Deepflow (Up); Park Tae-won; Kim Chae-ah (153/Joombas); Lee Aeng-du; Shin Sa-kang (XYXX)	Armadillo; Dwilly; Wiljam	2:23
9.	"Highlight"	Anthony Watts; Benjamin Falik; Pink Slip; Belift Lab; Bae Hae (Lalala Studio); Ninetysixunderbar; Ellie Suh; Na Yun-jeong; Mary Jane (Lalala Studio); Mia; Bay (153/Joombas)	Julia Lewis; Pink Slip	3:13
10.	"The Veiled Truth" (가려진 진실)	Kim Su-ji (Lalala Studio); Armadillo; Ca$hcow	Armadillo; Ca$hcow	1:35
Total length:				21:05

== Charts ==
=== Weekly charts ===
Weekly chart performance for The Sin: Bliss
Chart (2026)	Peak position
Australian Albums (ARIA)	20
Austrian Albums (Ö3 Austria)	3
Belgian Albums (Ultratop Flanders)	3
Belgian Albums (Ultratop Wallonia)	2
Croatian International Albums (HDU)	5
Dutch Albums (Album Top 100)	7
Finnish Albums (Suomen virallinen lista)	32
French Albums (SNEP)	1
German Albums (Offizielle Top 100)	4
German Pop Albums (Offizielle Top 100)	2
Greek Albums (IFPI)	6
Italian Albums (FIMI)	65
Japanese Albums (Oricon)	1
Japanese Combined Albums (Oricon)	1
Japanese Hot Albums (Billboard Japan)	1
Polish Albums (ZPAV)	11
Slovak Albums (ČNS IFPI)	37
South Korean Albums (Circle)	1
Spanish Albums (Promusicae)	20
Swedish Physical Albums (Sverigetopplistan)	10
Swiss Albums (Schweizer Hitparade)	4
UK Album Downloads (Official Charts)	10
UK Independent Albums (Official Charts)	45
US Billboard 200	1
US World Albums (Billboard)	1

=== Monthly charts ===
Monthly chart performance for The Sin: Bliss
Chart (2026)	Peak position
Japanese Albums (Oricon)	1
South Korean Albums (Circle)	2

== Certifications ==
Certifications for The Sin: Bliss
Region	Certification	Certified units/sales
Japan (RIAJ)	Platinum	250,000^{^}
South Korea (KMCA)	Million	1,000,000^{^}
South Korea (KMCA) Weverse version	Platinum	250,000^{^}
^{^} Shipments figures based on certification alone.
