= Memorabilia (EP) =

- Digital cover

EP by Enhypen
- Released: May 13, 2024
- Genre: K-pop
- Length: 19:48
- Labels: Belift Lab; Genie Music; Stone Music
- Producers: Jacob Attwooll; Fernstream; Slow Rabbit; Frants; Shinkung; Jay Noah; Kim Ju-hyeong; Alex Hauer

Enhypen chronology
Orange Blood (2023)	Memorabilia (2024)	Romance: Untold (2024)

Singles from Memorabilia
- 1. "Fatal Trouble" Released: May 13, 2024

Memorabilia is the first special and sixth overall extended play (EP) by South Korean boy band Enhypen. It was released on 13 May, 2024 through Belift Lab, alongside its lead single, "Fatal Trouble".

== Background and release ==
On April 1, 2024, it was reported that Enhypen will be releasing a special album as part of the Dark Moon: The Blood Altar webtoon series. On April 29, following teasers on the official Dark Moon social media pages on April 26 and 28 that included snippets of music and hints about a release date, it was announced that Enhypen would release Memorabilia on May 13, with pre-orders begin on April 29 in a limited edition.

According to Belift Lab, the special album would dive into themes of "destined love" and "the existential concern as a vampire". From the special album six tracks, two of them "One in a Billion" and "Criminal Love", are soundtracks from the Dark Moon series that were released in 2022 and 2023, respectively.

== Commercial performance ==
The album debuted at number three on the South Korean Circle Album Chart with over 252,000 copies sold in its first week. It also debuted at number three on the Japanese Oricon Albums Chart.

== Track listing ==
Memorabilia track listing
No.	Title	Writer(s)	Producer(s)	Length
1.	"One in a Billion"	Jacob Attwool; Thomas Daniel Bracciale; Alex Koste; Danke (Lalala Studio)	Jacob Attwooll	3:16
2.	"Criminal Love"	Fernstream; Anton Eriksson; Joseph Feinstein; Danke (Lalala Studio); Lee Yi-jin; Kim In-hyung; Kang Eun-jeong	Fernstream	3:35
3.	"Fatal Trouble"	Slow Rabbit; Danke (Lalala Studio); Gabriel Brandes; Matt Thomson; Max Lynedoch Graham; Lee Yi-jin; Maiz; Kim In-hyung; Patrick Kiloran; Will Simms; Kang Eun-jeong; Hybe	Slow Rabbit	2:50
4.	"Teeth" (performed by Jungwon, Heeseung, Sunoo & Ni-Ki)	Tim Tan; Frants; Shinkung; Jay Noah; Lee Yi-jin; Danke (Lalala Studio); Hybe; Jade. J; January 8th; Jo Yoon-kyung	Frants; Shinkung; Jay Noah	3:11
5.	"Lucifer" (performed by Jay, Jake & Sunghoon)	Kim Ju-hyeong; Charlotte Wilson; Chanti; Frankie Day; Danke (Lalala Studio); Hybe; Jade. J; January 8th; Jo Yoon-kyung	Kim Ju-hyeong	3:47
6.	"Scream"	Alex Hauer; Josh McClelland; Ryan Lawrie; Danke (Lalala Studio); Kim In-hyung; Hybe; Lee Yi-jin; Kang Eun-jeong	Alex Hauer	3:07
Total length:				19:48

== Charts ==
=== Weekly charts ===
Weekly chart performance for Memorabilia
Chart (2024)	Peak position
Austrian Albums (Ö3 Austria)	64
Belgian Albums (Ultratop Flanders)	109
Belgian Albums (Ultratop Wallonia)	63
Croatian International Albums (HDU)	23
French Albums (SNEP)	51
German Albums (Offizielle Top 100)	71
Japanese Albums (Oricon)	3
Japanese Hot Albums (Billboard Japan)	3
Portuguese Albums (AFP)	18
South Korean Albums (Circle)	3

=== Monthly charts ===
Monthly chart performance for Memorabilia
Chart (2024)	Position
Japanese Albums (Oricon)	12
South Korean Albums (Circle)	8

=== Year-end charts ===
Year-end chart performance for Memorabilia
Chart (2024)	Position
South Korean Albums (Circle)	85

== Certifications and sales ==
Certifications for Memorabilia
Region	Certification	Certified units/sales
South Korea (KMCA)	Platinum	250,000^{^}
^{^} Shipments figures based on certification alone.
