= Desire: Unleash =

- Digital cover

EP by Enhypen
- Released: June 5, 2025
- Length: 21:03
- Languages: Korean; English
- Labels: Belift Lab; Genie Music; Stone Music
- Producers: Armadillo; "Hitman" Bang; Cirkut; Tony Esterly; Frants; Jay; Hiss Noise; Pink Slip; Rykeyz; Slow Rabbit; Slush Puppy; Tyler Spry; Supreme Boi; Vitals

Enhypen chronology
Romance: Untold (2024)	Desire: Unleash (2025)	The Sin: Vanish (2026)

Singles from Desire: Unleash
- 1. "Loose" Released: April 4, 2025; 2. "Bad Desire (With or Without You)" Released: June 5, 2025

Desire: Unleash is the seventh extended play (EP) by South Korean boy band Enhypen. (Note: Belift Lab counts Desire: Unleash as Enhypen's sixth extended play.) It was released on June 5, 2025, through Belift Lab. The EP consists of eight tracks, including the singles "Loose" and "Bad Desire (With or Without You)".

== Background ==
Enhypen announced the release of Desire: Unleash during their Coachella set. This announcement was followed with the cryptic phrase "Can't touch you, but I'm gonna make you mine." The official comeback announcement was presented in the release of a video teaser as well as concept pictures.

== Commercial performance ==
On June 4, 2025, Belift announced that pre-orders for Desire: Unleash have surpassed 2.18 million copies; with this, Enhypen has achieved their third double-million seller. The album debuted atop the Billboard World Albums chart making it their seventh number one debut on the chart.

The second single "Bad Desire (With or Without You)" debuted at number 68 on Billboard Global 200, making it their highest entry on the chart. It reached at number one on iTunes in 38 regions The song debuted at number 72 on Global Spotify chart with 2.2 million streams. It debuted at number 33 on Billboard Hot 100 Philippines. In South Korea, the song debuted at number 79 on Circle chart.

In the United States, Desire: Unleash debuted at number three on the US Billboard 200 with 100,000 units sold and pure copies, it debuted atop the Top album sales chart with 95,000 pure copies. The album debuted with 7.29 million on-demand audio streams over the course of the week.

== Track listing ==
Desire: Unleash track listing
No.	Title	Writer(s)	Producers	Length
1.	"Flashover"	Tyler Spry; Akil "WorldwideFresh" King; Kareen Lomax; Joel Corry; Armadillo; Ranga; Lee Ji-won (MUMW); Oh Hyun-sun (Lalala Studio); Jo Yoon-kyung; Maryjane (Lalala Studio); Shizu; Danke (Lalala Studio); Bae Seong-hyeon (MUMW)	Tyler Spry; Armadillo	2:05
2.	"Bad Desire (With or Without You)"	Henry Walter; JBach; Jessica Agombar; "Hitman" Bang; Slow Rabbit; Armadillo; Jang Yeo-jin (Lalala Studio); Peridot	Cirkut; "Hitman" Bang; Slow Rabbit; Armadillo	2:21
3.	"Outside"	Supreme Boi; Hiss Noise; Slush Puppy; Martin; Kyle Buckley; Anthony Watts; Gino the Ghost; 329 (PNP); Green Lee (Lalala Studio); Lee Hyung-seok (PNP); Im Su-ran (Lalala Studio); Jep Jep (MUMW)	Supreme Boi; Hiss Noise; Slush Puppy; Pink Slip	2:01
4.	"Loose" (Korean version)	Tony Esterly; Josh Allen; Rosina "Soaky Siren" Russell; Anthony Watts; Armadillo; Shizu; Cha Yu-bin; Danke (Lalala Studio); Jang Jung-won (Jam Factory); Kim In-hyung; SSAC (MUMW); Jang Seung-min (Lalala Studio); Kim Su-ji (Lalala Studio); Jinli (Full8loom); Lee Ji-yeon (Lalala Studio); Yoon Ye-ji (PNP)	Tony Esterly; Vitals	3:32
5.	"Helium"	Frants; Jay; Edwin Honoret; Jeremiah Daly; Jesse Thomas; Chris (MUMW); "Hitman" Bang; Armadillo; Peridot; Shizu; Bay (153/Joombas); Choi Me-i (153/Joombas); Na Jeong-ah (153/Joombas); January 8th; Lee Seu-ran; Hwang Yu-bin (XYXX); Kim Su-ji (Lalala Studio); Jo Yoon-kyung	Frants; Jay	2:42
6.	"Too Close"	Ryan "Rykeyz" Williamson; Whitney Phillips; Roland "Rollo" Spreckley; Max; Mayer Hawthorne; Armadillo; Shizu; Peridot; Hwang Yu-bin (XYXX); Jang Seung-min (Lalala Studio); Danke (Lalala Studio); Cha Yu-bin; Oh Hyun-sun (Lalala Studio); Na Jeong-ah (153/Joombas); Na Yun-jeong (Lalala Studio)	Rykeyz	2:26
7.	"Bad Desire (With or Without You)" (English version)	Henry Walter; JBach; Jessica Agombar; "Hitman" Bang; Slow Rabbit; Armadillo	Cirkut; "Hitman" Bang; Slow Rabbit; Armadillo	2:21
8.	"Loose"	Tony Esterly; Josh Allen; Rosina "Soaky Siren" Russell; Anthony Watts	Tony Esterly; Vitals	3:30
Total length:				21:03

== Charts ==
=== Weekly charts ===
Weekly chart performance for Desire: Unleash
Chart (2025)	Peak position
Australian Albums (ARIA)	53
Austrian Albums (Ö3 Austria)	4
Belgian Albums (Ultratop Flanders)	2
Belgian Albums (Ultratop Wallonia)	2
Croatian International Albums (HDU)	7
Dutch Albums (Album Top 100)	35
French Albums (SNEP)	2
German Albums (Offizielle Top 100)	3
Greek Albums (IFPI)	1
Hungarian Albums (MAHASZ)	5
Italian Albums (FIMI)	57
Japanese Albums (Oricon)	1
Japanese Combined Albums (Oricon)	1
Japanese Hot Albums (Billboard Japan)	1
Norwegian Physical Albums (IFPI Norge)	5
Polish Albums (ZPAV)	2
Portuguese Albums (AFP)	92
South Korean Albums (Circle)	1
Spanish Albums (PROMUSICAE)	27
Swedish Physical Albums (Sverigetopplistan)	3
Swiss Albums (Schweizer Hitparade)	11
US Billboard 200	3
US World Albums (Billboard)	1

=== Monthly charts ===
Monthly chart performance for Desire: Unleash
Chart (2025)	Position
Japanese Albums (Oricon)	4
South Korean Albums (Circle)	1

=== Year-end charts ===
Year-end chart performance for Desire: Unleash
Chart (2025)	Position
French Albums (SNEP)	153
Japanese Albums (Oricon)	11
Japanese Top Albums Sales (Billboard Japan)	13
South Korean Albums (Circle)	4
US World Albums (Billboard)	9

== Certifications ==
Certifications for Desire: Unleash
Region	Certification	Certified units/sales
Japan (RIAJ)	Platinum	250,000^{^}
South Korea (KMCA)	2× Million	2,000,000^{^}
South Korea (KMCA) Weverse Albums edition	Platinum	250,000^{^}
^{^} Shipments figures based on certification alone.
