= Romance: Untold =

- Digital cover

Studio album by Enhypen
- Released: July 12, 2024
- Studios: Carrot Express (Seoul); HYBE (Seoul); Young (Seoul)
- Genres: K-pop; R&B; synth-pop
- Length: 25:51
- Languages: Korean; English
- Labels: Belift Lab; Genie Music; Stone Music
- Producers: Cirkut; Count Baldor; El Capitxn; Heeseung; "Hitman" Bang; Jvke; Mike Daley; Nara (Vendors); Nico Stadi; Pearl Lion; Slow Rabbit; Sweater Beats; Vaughn Oliver; Wonderkid; ZVC

Enhypen chronology
Memorabilia (2024)	Romance: Untold (2024)	Desire: Unleash (2025)

Singles from Romance: Untold
- 1. "XO (Only If You Say Yes)" Released: July 12, 2024

Repackage edition cover
- Digital cover

Singles from Romance: Untold -Daydream-
- 1. "No Doubt" Released: November 11, 2024

Romance: Untold is the second Korean-language and third studio album by South Korean boy band Enhypen, released on July 12, 2024, through Belift Lab. The album consists of nine tracks, including the lead single "XO (Only If You Say Yes)". It reached number one in South Korea, Japan and France, and number two on the US Billboard 200.

The album was reissued as Romance: Untold -Daydream- on November 11, 2024. In addition to the original album, the reissue includes two new songs, including the lead single "No Doubt".

== Background and release ==
=== Romance: Untold ===
On June 16, the logo teaser for Enhypen's second studio album, Romance: Untold, was released, with pre-orders starting the next day. On June 20, two concept cinema posters for the album were posted on the group's official social media accounts, teasing the release of a short film on June 22 in collaboration with director Lee Chung-hyun. Romance: Untold album was released on July 12, 2024.

=== Romance: Untold -Daydream- ===
On September 25, it was reported that Enhypen would release a repackage of Romance: Untold in November. The repackage, Romance: Untold -Daydream-, was announced on October 14. The repackage adds two new songs, "Daydream" and "No Doubt", with the latter serving as the lead single. The repackage was released on November 11.

Additionally, a Japanese edition of the repackage will include Japanese-language versions of "No Doubt" and the band's previous single, "XO (Only If You Say Yes)".

== Critical reception ==
Professional ratings
Review scores
Source	Rating
NME	4/5 stars

Tanu I. Raj of NME described the album as "largely dominated by synthpop and R&B" and felt that the "upbeat energy of 'Brought the Heat Back' is surprisingly aplenty across Romance: Untold, in contrast to the gloomy vibes of the album's teasers". Raj found the chorus of "Royalty" to be "annoying" and "Paranormal" an "awkward addition" for its drum 'n' bass style.

== Commercial performance ==
The lead single "XO" (Only If You Say Yes) became their third song to debut on the Billboard Global 200 chart at number 84. In the Philippines, the song debuted at number nineteen on the Philippines Billboard Hot 100, it was their first song to enter the chart. It also debuted on the top forty in Japan Hot 100 at number 34. And it debuted at number 90 in Korea Circle chart, and was ranked at number two on the Show Champion show chart

Second single "Brought The Heat Back" debuted at 170 on the Korea Circle chart, and it debuted at number eight on the Billboard World Digital Songs Sales chart. It was ranked at number three on the Show Champion show chart.

"No Doubt" debuted at number 55 in Korea Circle songs chart, it was their highest-charting single in the country. In Japan it debuted at number 24 on the Japan Hot 100 chart.

Romance: Untold garnered pre-orders of over 2.2 million and has sold more than 1.8 million copies worldwide on its first day of release, It debuted at number one on the South Korean Circle Album Chart with over two million copies sold of its three versions in its first week of availability, it was certified two times Platinum in Korean with more than 2.5 million copies sold. It reached number one on both Japan's Oricon Albums Chart and Billboard Hot Albums chart in its second week. The album debuted at number two on the US Billboard 200 with 117,000 pure album sales and 9.53 million streams, making it their highest-charting album in the country. It was their longest charting album on the Billboard 200 climbing up to 149 on its twelfth week on the chart, it spent a total of nineteen weeks on the chart. Following the release of Romance: Untold -Daydream-, the original version re-entered at number seven with 54,000 units on the week dated November 30, 2024, its 13th week on the chart.

Romance: Untold was the best-selling k-pop album in 2024 and the 2nd best-selling album worldwide.

== Track listing ==
Romance: Untold track listing
No.	Title	Writer(s)	Producer(s)	Length
1.	"Moonstruck"	Slow Rabbit; Koda; Chris Collins; True (153/Joombas); Jang Yeo-jin (Lalala Studio); "Hitman" Bang; Kim Su-ji (Lalala Studio)	Slow Rabbit	2:38
2.	"XO (Only If You Say Yes)"	Jvke; ZVC; "Hitman" Bang; Danke (Lalala Studio); Armadillo; Jo Yoon-kyung	Jvke; ZVC	3:08
3.	"Your Eyes Only"	Mike Daley; Sweater Beats; Patrick "J. Que" Smith; Tony Ferrari; Wonderkid; "Hitman" Bang; Danke (Lalala Studio); Kim In-hyung; Hwang Yu-bin; Mot Mal (Lalala Studio)	Mike Daley; Sweater Beats; Wonderkid	2:20
4.	"Hundred Broken Hearts"	Teemu Brunila; Nico Stadi; Liv Miraldi; Danke (Lalala Studio); Jungwon; January 8th; Oh Hyun-sun (Lalala Studio); "Hitman" Bang; Hwang Yu-bin; Bay (153/Joombas); Kim Yong-ju (MUMW)	Nico Stadi	3:21
5.	"Brought the Heat Back"	Henry Walter; Inverness; JHart; Jesse Saint John; "Hitman" Bang; Danke (Lalala Studio); Hwang Yu-bin	Cirkut; Inverness (Note: Credited with additional production according to physical album track listing.)	2:56
6.	"Paranormal"	Count Baldor; January 8th; "Hitman" Bang; Gabriel Brandes; Max Lynedoch Graham; Matt Thomson; Slow Rabbit; Danke (Lalala Studio); Young Chance; Gxxdkelvin; Ollipop; Ryan Lawrie; Moon Ji-young (Lalala Studio); Hwang Yu-bin	Count Baldor; "Hitman" Bang; Slow Rabbit	2:35
7.	"Royalty"	Benjmn; Vaughn Oliver; Pearl Lion; Danke (Lalala Studio); "Hitman" Bang; Jo Yoon-kyung; Ellie Suh (153/Joombas); Lee Hyung-seok (PNP); Cha Yu-bin	Vaughn Oliver; Pearl Lion	2:50
8.	"Highway 1009"	Jungwon; Heeseung; Jay; Jake; Sunghoon; Sunoo; Ni-Ki; El Capitxn; Nara (Vendors); Coll!n (Vendors); Owl (Vendors); Chiller (Vendors)	Heeseung; El Capitxn; Nara (Vendors)	2:55
9.	"XO (Only If You Say Yes)" (featuring Jvke; English version)	Jvke; ZVC; Armadillo	Jvke; ZVC	3:08
Total length:				25:51

Romance: Untold CD bonus track
No.	Title	Writer(s)	Producer(s)	Length
10.	"Highway 1009" (narration version)	Jungwon; Heeseung; Jay; Jake; Sunghoon; Sunoo; Ni-Ki; El Capitxn; Nara (Vendors); Coll!n (Vendors); Owl (Vendors); Chiller (Vendors)	Heeseung; El Capitxn; Nara (Vendors)	3:59
Total length:				29:50

Romance: Untold -Daydream- bonus tracks
No.	Title	Writer(s)	Producer(s)	Length
1.	"Daydream"	Johnny Goldstein; Jim Lavigne; Christoper Tempest (Vodka); David Saint Fleur; Jason Derulo; "Hitman" Bang; Lee Seu-ran; Kim In-hyung; January 8th; Kim Bo-eun (Jam Factory); Ahn Young-ju	Johnny Goldstein	2:00
2.	"No Doubt"	Johnny Goldstein; Theron Thomas; Kasey Phillips; "Hitman" Bang; Armadillo; Ranga; Danke (Lalala Studio); Jo Yoon-kyung; Colin (MUMW); Bay (153/Joombas); Lee Yi-jin; Peridot; Kim Su-ji (Lalala Studio); Bae Seong-hyeon (MUMW)	Johnny Goldstein; Armadillo (Note: Credited with additional production according to physical album track listing.)	2:47

Romance: Untold -Daydream- (Japanese version) bonus tracks
No.	Title	Writer(s)	Producer(s)	Length
1.	"Daydream"	Johnny Goldstein; Jim Lavigne; Christoper Tempest (Vodka); David Saint Fleur; Jason Derulo; "Hitman" Bang; Lee Seu-ran; Kim In-hyung; January 8th; Kim Bo-eun (Jam Factory); Ahn Young-ju	Johnny Goldstein	2:00
2.	"No Doubt"	Johnny Goldstein; Theron Thomas; Kasey Phillips; "Hitman" Bang; Armadillo; Ranga; Danke (Lalala Studio); Jo Yoon-kyung; Colin (MUMW); Bay (153/Joombas); Lee Yi-jin; Peridot; Kim Su-ji (Lalala Studio); Bae Seong-hyeon (MUMW)	Johnny Goldstein; Armadillo (Note: Credited with additional production according to physical album track listing.)	2:47
3.	"XO (Only If You Say Yes)" (Japanese ver.)	Armadillo; Danke; Jvke; Cho; ZVC; "Hitman" Bang	Jvke; ZVC	3:08
4.	"No Doubt" (Japanese ver.)	Johnny Goldstein; Theron Thomas; Kasey Phillips; "Hitman" Bang; Armadillo; Ranga; Danke (Lalala Studio); Jo Yoon-kyung; Colin (MUMW); Bay (153/Joombas); Lee Yi-jin; Peridot; Kim Su-ji (Lalala Studio); Bae Seong-hyeon (MUMW)	Johnny Goldstein; Armadillo (Note: Credited with additional production according to physical album track listing.)	2:47

== Accolades ==
Awards and nominations for Romance: Untold
Award ceremony	Year	Category	Result	Ref.
D Awards	2025	Album of the Year (Daesang)	Won	

Music program awards for Romance: Untold
Song	Program	Date	Ref.
"XO (Only If You Say Yes)"	Music Bank	July 19, 2024	

== Charts ==
=== Weekly charts ===
Weekly chart performance for Romance: Untold
Chart (2024–2025)	Peak position
Australian Hitseekers Albums (ARIA)	4
Austrian Albums (Ö3 Austria)	2
Belgian Albums (Ultratop Flanders)	4
Belgian Albums (Ultratop Wallonia)	4
Croatian International Albums (HDU)	2
French Albums (SNEP)	1
German Albums (Offizielle Top 100)	4
Greek Albums (IFPI)	4
Hungarian Albums (MAHASZ)	8
Italian Albums (FIMI)	30
Japanese Albums (Oricon)	1
Japanese Combined Albums (Oricon)	1
Japanese Hot Albums (Billboard Japan)	1
Lithuanian Albums (AGATA)	49
New Zealand Albums (RMNZ)	34
Polish Albums (ZPAV)	7
Portuguese Albums (AFP)	4
South Korean Albums (Circle)	1
Spanish Albums (Promusicae)	12
Swedish Physical Albums (Sverigetopplistan)	4
Swiss Albums (Schweizer Hitparade)	11
UK Album Downloads (Official Charts)	11
US Billboard 200	2
US World Albums (Billboard)	1

Weekly chart performance for Romance: Untold -Daydream-
Chart (2024)	Peak position
Japanese Albums (Oricon)	1
Japanese Combined Albums (Oricon)	1
Japanese Hot Albums (Billboard Japan)	1
South Korean Albums (Circle)	1

=== Monthly charts ===
Monthly chart performance for Romance: Untold
Chart (2024)	Position
Japanese Albums (Oricon)	1
South Korean Albums (Circle)	2

=== Year-end charts ===
2024 year-end chart performance for Romance: Untold
Chart (2024)	Position
Belgian Albums (Ultratop Flanders)	136
French Albums (SNEP)	180
Global Albums (IFPI)	4
Japanese Albums (Oricon)	9
Japanese Combined Albums (Oricon)	10
Japanese Hot Albums (Billboard Japan)	12
South Korean Albums (Circle)	4
US Billboard 200	196

2025 year-end chart performance for Romance: Untold
Chart (2025)	Position
US World Albums (Billboard)	5

2024 year-end chart performance for Romance: Untold -Daydream-
Chart (2024)	Position
Japanese Albums (Oricon)	19
Japanese Hot Albums (Billboard Japan)	22
South Korean Albums (Circle)	13

2025 year-end chart performance for Romance: Untold -Daydream-
Chart (2025)	Position
Japanese Top Albums Sales (Billboard Japan)	98

== Certifications ==
Certifications for Romance: Untold
Region	Certification	Certified units/sales
Japan (RIAJ)	Platinum	250,000^{^}
Japan (RIAJ) Repackage	Platinum	250,000^{^}
South Korea (KMCA)	2× Million	2,000,000^{^}
South Korea (KMCA) Weverse Albums version	2× Platinum	500,000^{^}
South Korea (KMCA) repackage	Million	1,000,000^{^}
^{^} Shipments figures based on certification alone.

== Release history ==
Release history for Romance: Untold
Region	Date	Format	Version	Label
South Korea	July 12, 2024	CD	Romance: Untold	Belift; Genie; Stone
Various	July 12, 2024	Digital download; streaming	Romance: Untold	Belift; Genie; Stone
Various	November 11, 2024	Digital download; streaming	Romance: Untold -Daydream-	Belift; Genie; Stone
South Korea	November 11, 2024	CD	Romance: Untold -Daydream-	Belift; Genie; Stone
Japan	November 19, 2024	CD	Romance: Untold -Daydream-	Belift
