= Manifesto: Day 1 =

2022 EP by Enhypen

- Digital "D" version cover

EP by Enhypen
- Released: July 4, 2022
- Recorded: 2022
- Genre: Hip hop; drill; pop rock
- Length: 17:45
- Label: Belift Lab; Genie Music; Stone Music
- Producer: Wonderkid; Shinkung; "Hitman" Bang; BreadBeat; Waveshower; Ca$hcow

Enhypen chronology
Dimension: Dilemma (2021)	Manifesto: Day 1 (2022)	Sadame (2022)

Singles from Manifesto: Day 1
- 1. "Future Perfect (Pass the Mic)" Released: July 4, 2022

Manifesto: Day 1 is the third extended play (EP) by South Korean boy band Enhypen. It was released on July 4, 2022, through Belift Lab. The album consists of six tracks, including the lead single "Future Perfect (Pass the Mic)".

== Background and release ==
On June 14, Belift Lab announced that Enhypen would be releasing their third extended play (EP), Manifesto: Day 1 on July 4, with a trailer titled "Walk the Line" released the same day.

== Commercial performance ==
With 1.24 million copies sold in the first week of release, Manifesto: Day 1 became Enhypen's second million-selling album and made them the fastest K-pop group to earn two albums in the million-seller category. In the United States, Manifesto: Day 1 reached number one on the Billboard Top Album Sales chart.

== Track listing ==
Manifesto: Day 1 track listing
No.	Title	Writer(s)	Producer(s)	Length
1.	"Walk the Line"	Wonderkid; Shinkung; Hybe; Ca$hcow; Soma Genda; "Hitman" Bang; El Capitxn; Polar (Vendors)	Wonderkid; Shinkung	2:04
2.	"Future Perfect (Pass the Mic)"	Wonderkid; "Hitman" Bang; Supreme Boi; Jacob Aaron (The Hub); The Hub 88	Wonderkid; "Hitman" Bang	3:01
3.	"ParadoXXX Invasion"	Wonderkid; Alexander Karlsson; BreadBeat; Supreme Boi; Danke (Lalala Studio); January 8th; Lee Seu-ran; "Hitman" Bang; Jacob Aaron (The Hub); The Hub 88	Wonderkid; BreadBeat	3:07
4.	"TFW (That Feeling When)"	Wonderkid; DJ Kayvon; Softserveboy; Alex Keem; Danke (Lalala Studio); Perc%nt; Jo Mi-yang; Jo Yoon-kyung; Shinkung; January 8th	Wonderkid	3:18
5.	"Shout Out"	Waveshower; Andy Love; Lee Yi-jin; Ku Tae-woo; "Hitman" Bang; Danke (Lalala Studio); Jake	Waveshower	3:48
6.	"Foreshadow"	Wonderkid; Ca$hcow; Hybe; "Hitman" Bang	Wonderkid; Ca$hcow	2:27
Total length:				17:45

== Accolades ==
Music program awards
Song	Program	Date	Ref.
"Future Perfect (Pass the Mic)"	The Show	July 12, 2022	
"Future Perfect (Pass the Mic)"	Show Champion	July 13, 2022	
"Future Perfect (Pass the Mic)"	Music Bank	July 15, 2022	

== Other uses ==
For the 2026 Winter Olympics, the song "Shout Out" was selected as Team Korea's official anthem.

== Charts ==
=== Weekly charts ===
Weekly chart performance
Chart (2022)	Peak position
Australian Hitseekers Albums (ARIA)	12
Austrian Albums (Ö3 Austria)	20
Belgian Albums (Ultratop Flanders)	9
Belgian Albums (Ultratop Wallonia)	6
Croatian International Albums (HDU)	1
Finnish Albums (Suomen virallinen lista)	12
French Albums (SNEP)	10
German Albums (Offizielle Top 100)	6
Greek Albums (IFPI)	4
Hungarian Albums (MAHASZ)	5
Japanese Albums (Oricon)	1
Japanese Hot Albums (Billboard Japan)	1
Polish Albums (ZPAV)	8
South Korean Albums (Circle)	2
Spanish Albums (Promusicae)	36
Swedish Physical Albums (Sverigetopplistan)	13
Swiss Albums (Schweizer Hitparade)	15
US Billboard 200	6
US World Albums (Billboard)	1

=== Monthly charts ===
Monthly chart performance
Chart (2022)	Peak position
Japanese Albums (Oricon)	4
South Korean Albums (Circle)	2

=== Year-end charts ===
Year-end chart performance
Chart (2022)	Position
French Albums (SNEP)	197
Japanese Albums (Oricon)	28
Japanese Hot Albums (Billboard Japan)	41
South Korean Albums (Circle)	14
South Korean Albums (Circle) Weverse Album	84

== Certifications and sales ==
Certifications
Region	Certification	Certified units/sales
Japan (RIAJ)	Gold	100,000^{^}
South Korea (KMCA)	Million	1,000,000^{^}
^{^} Shipments figures based on certification alone.

== Release history ==
Release formats for Manifesto: Day 1
Region	Date	Format	Label	Ref.
Various	July 4, 2022	CD; digital download; streaming	Belift Lab; Genie; Stone	
