= The Sin: Vanish =

- Digital cover

EP by Enhypen
- Released: January 16, 2026
- Length: 23:00
- Languages: Korean; English
- Label: Belift Lab
- Producers: Armadillo; Jake; Heeseung; Pat Morrissey; Ca$hcow; Grant Boutin; Connor McDonough; Riley McDonough; "Hitman" Bang; Couros; Luis Salazar; Ranga; SkipOnDaBeat; Dwilly; Pink Slip

Enhypen chronology
| Desire: Unleash (2025) | The Sin: Vanish (2026) | The Sin: Bliss (2026) |

Singles from The Sin: Vanish
- 1. "Knife" Released: January 16, 2026

The Sin: Vanish is the eight extended play (EP) by South Korean boy band Enhypen. (Note: Belift Lab counts The Sin: Vanish as Enhypen's seventh extended play.) It was released on January 16, 2026, through Belift Lab. The EP consists of 11 tracks, including the lead single "Knife". It is the group's final release as a seven-piece ensemble, with Heeseung.

== Background ==
In December 2025, Belift Lab announced on Weverse the release of the EP on January 16, 2026. The EP marks the first release by Enhypen of their new The Sin series. The group had also launched a fictional news website called "Vampire Now" along with an Instagram account to tease the EP. The group has released teasers and visuals in line with the release of the EP.

== Track listing ==
The Sin: Vanish track listing
| No. | Title | Writer(s) | Producer(s) | Length |
|---|---|---|---|---|
| 1. | "The Beginning" (사건의 발단, lit. "The beginning of the incident") | Armadillo; Jake; Rence; Lukas Costas; Kim Su-ji (Lalala Studio); Hybe | Armadillo; Jake; Rence (Note: Credited with additional production according to physical album track listing.); Lukas Costas (Note: Credited with additional production according to physical album track listing.) | 2:13 |
| 2. | "No Way Back" (featuring So!YoON!) | Pat Morrissey; Micah Premnath; Grant Averill; David Charles Fischer; Kim Su-ji (Lalala Studio); Armadillo; Peridot; Jo Yoon-kyung; Kim In-hyung (Jam Factory); Youra (Full8loom); Im Su-ran (Lalala Studio); Park Sang-yu (153/Joombas) | Pat Morrissey | 3:05 |
| 3. | "The Fugitives" (도망자들) | Armadillo; Ca$hcow; Ranga; Kim Su-ji (Lalala Studio); Hybe | Armadillo; Ca$hcow; Ranga | 1:35 |
| 4. | "Knife" | Grant Boutin; Connor McDonough; Riley McDonough; Jake Torrey; "Hitman" Bang; Armadillo; Gaeko; Supreme Boi; GxxdKelvin | Grant Boutin; Connor McDonough; Riley McDonough; "Hitman" Bang; Armadillo | 2:19 |
| 5. | "Stealer" | Couros; Luis Salazar; Charlotte Lee; Karin "Kiddo" Bertilsson; Peridot; Armadillo; Park Sang-yu (153/Joombas); Park Woo-hyun; Danke (Lalala Studio); Rizin (153/Joombas); Kelbyul (153/Joombas); Moon Yeo-reum (Jam Factory); Mia (153/Joombas); Kim Su-ji (Lalala Studio); Ellie Suh (153/Joombas); Yeon Bo-ra (153/Joombas) | Couros; Luis Salazar | 2:56 |
| 6. | "The Voice" (우리가 찾던 목소리, lit. "The voice we were looking for") | Armadillo; Ca$hcow; Ranga; Kim Su-ji (Lalala Studio) | Armadillo; Ca$hcow; Ranga | 1:12 |
| 7. | "Witnesses" (목격자, lit. "Witness") | Kim Su-ji (Lalala Studio); Hybe | Ca$hcow | 1:05 |
| 8. | "Big Girls Don't Cry" | Thom Bridges; Beau Nox; Marcus Lomax; "Hitman" Bang; Armadillo; Beam; SkipOnDaBeat; Gaeko | Thom Bridges; "Hitman" Bang; Armadillo; Beam; SkipOnDaBeat | 1:58 |
| 9. | "Lost Island" | David Wilson; Gray Hawken; Castle; Kim Su-ji (Lalala Studio); Peridot; Armadillo; Jang Jung-won (Jam Factory); Jellybean (153/Joombas); Na Jeong-ah (153/Joombas); Rizin; Kelbyul (153/Joombas); Park Woo-hyun | Dwilly | 2:45 |
| 10. | "Sleep Tight" | Armadillo; Jake; Ca$hcow; Kyle Buckley; Anthony Watts; Heeseung; DBLV (Chiller); Kang Chae-woo (Wavecloud); Hyeong-geun (PNP); Cha Yu-bin; Jo In-ho (Lalala Studio); Jo Yoon-kyung; Kyung Seung-wan | Armadillo; Jake; Ca$hcow; Pink Slip | 2:37 |
| 11. | "The Beyond" (사건의 너머, lit. "Beyond the incident") | Armadillo; Ca$hcow; Kim Su-ji (Lalala Studio); Hybe | Armadillo; Ca$hcow | 1:58 |
| Total length: | | | | 23:00 |

== Charts ==
=== Weekly charts ===
Weekly chart performance for The Sin: Vanish
| Chart (2026) | Peak position |
|---|---|
| Australian Albums (ARIA) | 15 |
| Austrian Albums (Ö3 Austria) | 3 |
| Belgian Albums (Ultratop Flanders) | 4 |
| Belgian Albums (Ultratop Wallonia) | 2 |
| Canadian Albums (Billboard) | 97 |
| Croatian International Albums (HDU) | 5 |
| Dutch Albums (Album Top 100) | 19 |
| Finnish Albums (Suomen virallinen lista) | 21 |
| French Albums (SNEP) | 2 |
| German Albums (Offizielle Top 100) | 5 |
| German Pop Albums (Offizielle Top 100) | 3 |
| Greek Albums (IFPI) | 1 |
| Hungarian Albums (MAHASZ) | 23 |
| Japanese Albums (Oricon) | 2 |
| Japanese Combined Albums (Oricon) | 2 |
| Japanese Hot Albums (Billboard Japan) | 2 |
| Lithuanian Albums (AGATA) | 72 |
| New Zealand Albums (RMNZ) | 23 |
| Polish Albums (ZPAV) | 6 |
| Portuguese Albums (AFP) | 115 |
| South Korean Albums (Circle) | 1 |
| Spanish Albums (Promusicae) | 85 |
| Swedish Albums (Sverigetopplistan) | 47 |
| Swiss Albums (Schweizer Hitparade) | 5 |
| UK Album Downloads (Official Charts) | 11 |
| UK Independent Albums Breakers (OCC) | 12 |
| US Billboard 200 | 2 |
| US World Albums (Billboard) | 1 |

=== Monthly charts ===
Monthly chart performance for The Sin: Vanish
| Chart (2026) | Position |
|---|---|
| Japanese Albums (Oricon) | 2 |
| South Korean Albums (Circle) | 1 |

== Certifications ==
Certifications for The Sin: Vanish
| Region | Certification | Certified units/sales |
|---|---|---|
| Japan (RIAJ) | Platinum | 250,000^{^} |
| South Korea (KMCA) | 2× Million | 2,000,000^{^} |
| South Korea (KMCA) Weverse version | Platinum | 250,000^{^} |
^{^} Shipments figures based on certification alone.
