= Enhypen =

South Korean boy band

- Enhypen in June 2026; L–R: Jake, Jay, Sunghoon, Ni-Ki, Jungwon, and Sunoo

Background information
- Origin: Seoul, South Korea
- Genres: K-pop; pop rock; hip-hop
- Years active: 2020–present
- Labels: Belift Lab; Virgin/Universal Music Japan
- Members: Jay; Jake; Sunghoon; Sunoo; Jungwon; Ni-Ki
- Past members: Heeseung
- Website: beliftlab.com/enhypen

Korean name
- Hangul: 엔하이픈
- RR: Enhaipeun
- MR: Enhaip'ŭn

Enhypen (Korean: 엔하이픈, stylized in all caps) is a South Korean boy band under Belift Lab, a former joint venture between CJ ENM and Hybe Corporation. The group was formed through the 2020 survival competition show I-Land. The group consists of six members: Jay, Jake, Sunghoon, Sunoo, Jungwon, and Ni-Ki. Enhypen was originally a seven-piece ensemble; Heeseung left the group in March 2026.

Enhypen debuted on November 30, 2020, with the extended play (EP) Border: Day One, which became the highest-selling album of a K-pop group that debuted in 2020. Their second EP Border: Carnival (2021) debuted at number one on the Oricon Albums Chart, becoming their first chart-topping album in Japan. The group released their first studio album, Dimension: Dilemma, the same year; the album became their first to spell over a million copies. The group's third EP Manifesto: Day 1 (2022) continued their success, making them the fastest K-pop group to achieve two million-seller albums. In 2023, Enhypen released their Blood series, with Dark Blood in May and Orange Blood in November, the former of which became the group's first top-five entry in the US Billboard 200. After their second studio album Romance: Untold (2024) and sixth EP Desire: Unleash (2025), the group began their The Sin series in 2026 with The Sin: Vanish in January. The second installment of the series, The Sin: Bliss, was released in August peaked at number one on the Billboard 200, becoming the group's first number-one entry on the chart.

== Name ==
The name Enhypen was introduced during the live broadcast of the final episode of I-Land. Etymologically, the group derives their name from the hyphen symbol (-), representing "Connection, Discovery, & Growth". Similar to how a hyphen connects different words to create new meanings, Enhypen aims "to come together to connect, discover and grow together to form a new act".

== Career ==
=== Pre-debut activities and formation through I-Land ===
In March 2019, Belift Lab was co-founded by South Korean entertainment agencies CJ E&M and Hybe Corporation, with plans to create a new band in 2020. Auditions commenced the same month in Seoul, the United States, Taiwan, and Japan, among others locations, seeking male trainees born between 1997 and 2008.

On May 8, 2020, television channel Mnet announced the survival competition series I-Land as part of the joint venture between the two entertainment companies that "follows the process of next generation K-pop artists being born". Enhypen was formed through the show, which featured 23 male trainees, some of whom were originally auditioned for Belift, while others transferred from Big Hit Music. The show aired weekly on Mnet from June 26 to September 18, 2020, and internationally on Hybe Labels' YouTube channel. The series was split into two parts, with the top 12 contestants from the first part advancing to the second. On the last episode of the show, seven members were selected out of the nine final contestants, with six chosen by global rankings and one by producers' choice. The final lineup—in ranking order—was Jungwon, Jay, Jake, Ni-Ki, Heeseung, Sunghoon and Sunoo, and was announced on the live television broadcast of the finale.

=== 2020–2021: Debut, Border series, and Dimension: Dilemma ===
On October 22, 2020, a trailer titled "Choose-Chosen" was posted to Enhypen's YouTube channel, announcing the group's debut in November 2020. A second trailer titled "Dusk-Dawn" was released three days later, followed by a pair of concept mood boards on October 27. On October 28, Belift announced that Enhypen would release their debut extended play (EP) Border: Day One on November 30. Ahead of their debut, the group accumulated over one million followers on social media platforms TikTok, Twitter, YouTube, Instagram, and V Live.

On November 4, Border: Day One was announced to have amassed over 150,000 pre-orders within two days, surpassing 300,000 copies by November 21. The EP and lead single "Given-Taken" were released on November 30, accompanied by a live showcase.

On December 4, Enhypen officially made their live debut on KBS' Music Bank, performing "Given-Taken". Border: Day One charted at number 39 on the Japanese Oricon 2020 Yearly Album Chart and at number two on the South Korean Gaon Album Chart, having sold 318,528 copies in one day domestically and becoming the highest-selling album by a K-pop group that debuted in 2020. Within two weeks of their debut, the band won Next Leader Award at the 2020 Fact Music Awards. In February 2021, Border: Day One received a platinum certification from the Korea Music Content Association (KMCA), the group's first certification in the country.

Their second EP, Border: Carnival, was announced in a trailer titled "Intro: The Invitation" released on April 5. By the day before its release, pre-orders for the EP surpassed 450,000 copies. The EP was released in conjunction with lead single "Drunk-Dazed" on April 26. On May 4, Enhypen received their first-ever music show win on SBS MTV's The Show with "Drunk-Dazed", followed by wins on Show Champion and Music Bank. Border: Carnival debuted at number one on the Oricon Albums Chart, the group's first chart-topper in Japan, with over 83,000 copies sold. On May 25, Border: Carnival debuted at number 18 on the US Billboard 200 chart.

On July 6, Enhypen made their Japanese debut with the single "Border: Hakanai" (Border : 儚い). Its track list included "Forget Me Not", which served as the opening theme for the anime Re-Main, and the Japanese versions of "Given-Taken" and "Let Me In (20 Cube)". On July 29, Enhypen collaborated with the animated television series Tayo the Little Bus to remake the theme song "Hey Tayo" and released a new song titled "Billy Poco".

On August 25, Belift confirmed that Enhypen would release new music at the end of September, though plans were postponed when multiple members tested positive for COVID-19. On September 16, Belift announced the members had recovered and that their first studio album, Dimension: Dilemma, would be released on October 12, with a trailer titled "Intro: Whiteout" released on September 17. By October 7, pre-orders surpassed 910,000 copies. The album was released on October 12, placing first on the national album charts of South Korea and Japan. On October 19, Enhypen received their fourth music show win on The Show with "Tamed-Dashed", followed by wins on Show Champion and Music Bank. On October 25, Dimension: Dilemma debuted at number 11 on the Billboard 200, surpassing their previous peak with Border: Carnival. In addition, Enhypen also entered Billboard Artist 100 at number 12. Dimension: Dilemma sold over 1.1 million copies, making it the group's first-ever million-selling album, and was certified as such by KMCA in December. Enhypen released Dimension: Answer, a repackaged version of Dimension: Dilemma, on January 10, 2022.

=== 2022: Dimension series, Manifesto: Day 1, first world tour, and Sadame ===
On January 19, Enhypen received their seventh music show win on MBC M's Show Champion with "Blessed-Cursed", followed by a win on Music Bank on January 21. On January 16, the first of a new fictional webtoon series about the group was released, titled Dark Moon: The Blood Altar.

In February, Enhypen released the original Japanese song "Always" as the theme for the NTV drama Muchaburi! I will be the president, which aired beginning in January. On February 11, Belift announced that member Sunoo tested positive for COVID-19. On February 15, Belift announced Sunoo had fully recovered and ended quarantine, resuming activities on February 16.

Enhypen's Japanese digital single "Always" was released on February 22. It was included on the track list of Enhypen's second Japanese single "Dimension: Senkō" (Dimension: 閃光). The single was released on May 3 and also featured Japanese versions of "Tamed-Dashed" and "Drunk-Dazed". "Tamed-Dashed" became the group's first number one song on the Billboard Japan Hot 100, with 386,142 units sold in the first week.

On June 14, Belift announced that Enhypen would be releasing their third EP, Manifesto: Day 1, on July 4, with a trailer titled "Walk the Line" released on the same day. The EP became their second million-selling album and made them the fastest K-pop group to achieve two such albums. On July 12, the group received their ninth music show win on The Show with "Future Perfect (Pass the Mic)", followed by wins on Show Champion and Music Bank.

In July, it was announced that Enhypen would be embarking on their first world tour, Manifesto, starting in September 2022 in Seoul and ending in Japan in November. On August 12, they released the original song "I Need The Light" (구해줘) as the theme for the drama series Mimicus. The same day, Esquire Korea officially announced that Enhypen would be on the cover of its September 2022 issue.

On August 17, it was announced Sunoo would not be able to fly to Los Angeles for the group's performance at KCON for health reasons. Two days later, Enhypen threw out the ceremonial first pitch for Major League Baseball team Los Angeles Dodgers at their game against Miami Marlins at Dodger Stadium in Los Angeles, California. On August 24, Belift announced that Sunoo had recovered and would resume his activities on the same day. On August 27, the teaser for "One in a Billion", from the official soundtrack for the webtoon Dark Moon: The Blood Altar, was released; the song premiered on September 3, and the music video and digital single were officially released on September 6. On October 18, was announced that Enhypen's first world tour would be extended through January and February 2023 with concerts in Philippines and Thailand.

On October 26, Enhypen's first Japanese studio album Sadame was released through Universal Music Japan with nine tracks: the original Japanese songs "Always" and "Forget Me Not", the Japanese versions of "Blessed-Cursed" and "Future Perfect (Pass the Mic)", and the Japanese version "Polaroid Love" as a CD-only bonus track. Sadame also contained the original Japanese song "Make the Change", which was selected as the theme song for the second season of the Tokai TV and Fuji TV Japanese drama Saikou no Obahan Nakajima Haruko, which began airing on October 8. The song was digitally pre-released on October 12.

On November 16, it was announced that two shows in Japan were added to Enhypen's world tour at Kyocera Dome in Osaka. On November 28, the song "Zero Moment"—performed by members Heeseung, Jay and Jake—was released as a part of the theme songs for the ENA and Genie TV Korean drama Summer Strike, which began airing in November 21.

=== 2023: Blood series and subsequent Japanese releases ===
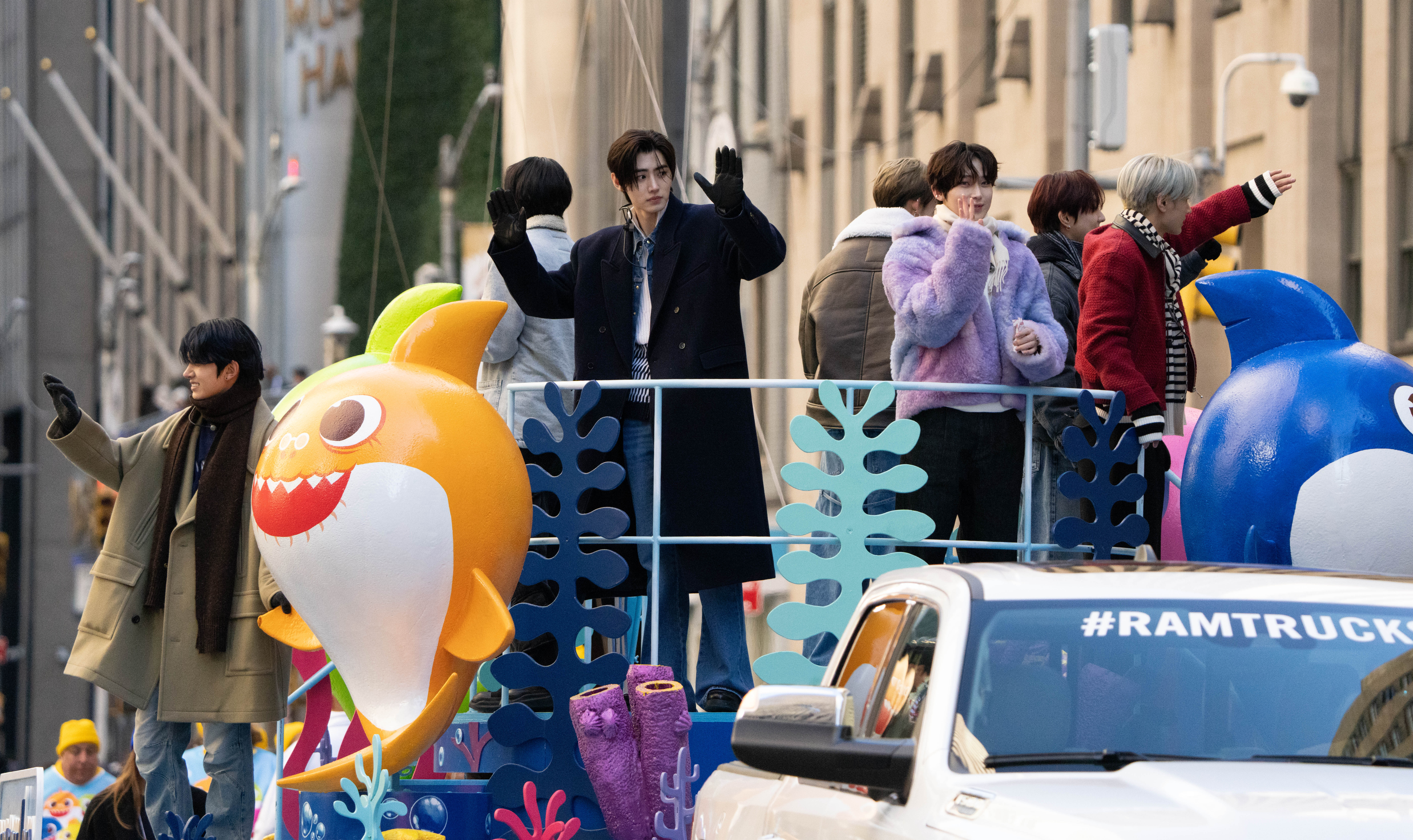
Enhypen at the Macy's Thanksgiving Day Parade in New York City, 2023

On January 21 and 22, 2023, Enhypen held their first two-day sold out dome concert at Kyocera as part of the Manifesto World Tour. They also became the first K-pop group to sell out three consecutive shows at the Mall of Asia Arena in the Philippines from February 3 to 5, doing so on their first world tour.

On April 14, Belift confirmed that Enhypen would be releasing their fourth EP in May. The name of the EP, Dark Blood, and its May 22 release date were unveiled alongside the official logo trailer on April 23. On May 23, South Korea's Hanteo Chart announced that Dark Blood sold over 1.1 million copies on its first day alone, surpassing the sales of Enhypen's previous EP. Despite the two-week shipment delay in the US, it became the group's fifth top-10 entry on the Billboard Top Album Sales chart and their first ever top-five Billboard 200 entry.

On May 30, it was announced that Enhypen would be embarking on their second world tour, Fate, starting in Seoul at KSPO Dome on July 29 and 30, followed by two shows each at Kyocera Dome in Japan on September 2 and 3 and Tokyo Dome on September 13 and 14. The tour continued in United States in October in Los Angeles, Glendale, Houston, Dallas, Newark, and Chicago.

On June 1, the group received their twelfth music show win on Mnet's M Countdown, their first-ever win on the show, with "Bite Me", followed the next day by another win on Music Bank. In late June, video game series Pokémon announced a collaboration with Enhypen through the Pokémon Music Collective project with a new song titled "One and Only", which was released on July 12.

On July 2, it was announced that Enhypen would release their third Japanese single "You" (結). The single, which includes the Japanese versions of "Bite Me" and "Bills" and the original Japanese song "Blossom", was released on September 5, with a showcase in Japan on September 7.

On October 15, Belift announced that Enhypen would be releasing their fifth EP, Orange Blood, on November 17, with a logo teaser released the same day. On November 24, the group received their thirteenth music show win on Music Bank with the EP's lead single, "Sweet Venom".

On October 24, it was announced that Enhypen's second world tour would be extended through January and February 2024 with concerts in Taiwan, Singapore, China, and the Philippines. On November 22, due to demand, two more shows were added in Seoul at KSPO Dome on February 24 and 25, 2024. On December 9, a third show was added in Macau due to demand. On February 5, 2024, due to demand, a third show was added in Seoul at KSPO Dome on February 23. On February 6, it was announced that five more concerts were added in United States in Anaheim, Oakland, Tacoma, Rosemont, and Belmont Park during April 24 to 28 and May 1 to 3. On March 17, it was announced that eleven more concerts were added in Japan in Saitama, Fukuoka, Hiroshima, Aichi and Miyagi between June 11 and September 1.

=== 2024: Memorabilia and Romance: Untold ===
On April 29, 2024, following teasers on the official Dark Moon: The Blood Altar social media pages on April 26 and 28 that included snippets of music and hints about a release date, it was announced that Enhypen would release a special album titled Memorabilia for the webtoon on May 13.

On May 14, it was reported that Enhypen will release a new album in mid-July. Six days later, two more concerts were added for their second world tour in Jakarta from August 17 to 18. On May 29, the music video for Japanese rock band Glay's song "Whodunit" featuring was released. Jay also contributed to the writing of the lyrics.

On June 16, the logo teaser for Enhypen's second studio album Romance: Untold was released. Four days later, two concept cinema posters for the album were posted on the group's official social media accounts, teasing the release of a short film on June 22 in collaboration with director Lee Chung-hyun. Romance: Untold album was released on July 12.

On November 11, Enhypen released their second repackage album, Romance: Untold -Daydream-.

=== 2025: Desire: Unleash and fourth Japanese single ===
On January 10, 2025, Heeseung and Jake were featured on American rapper Flo Rida's new single "Confessions" alongside American rapper Paul Russell. On April 4, Enhypen released a digital single titled "Loose". They performed the song on Jimmy Kimmel Live! on April 10, their first performance on US television. They then performed at Coachella 2025's Sahara Tent on April 12 and 19. In between performances, the group announced the dates and venues for the upcoming late-summer U.S. and European legs of their Walk the Line world tour.

At the end of the week two Coachella set, the title and release-date for the group's upcoming sixth EP, Desire: Unleash was announced, with a release date of June 5. On June 4, Belift announced that pre-orders for Desire: Unleash had surpassed 2.18 million copies. on June 12, the group received their fifteenth show win on Mnet's M Countdown with the album's lead single, "Bad Desire (With or Without You)", followed the next day by another win on KBS' Music Bank, and on June 15 by their first-ever win on SBS' Inkigayo.

On June 12, it was announced that Enhypen would release their fourth Japanese single "Yoi" (宵). The single, which includes the Japanese version of "Bad Desire (With or Without You)" and the original Japanese songs "Shine on Me" and "Echoes", was released on July 29, with a showcase in Japan on June 31.

=== 2026–present: The Sin series and Heeseung's departure ===
On January 16, 2026, Enhypen began their new The Sin series with the release of their seventh EP, The Sin: Vanish.

On March 10, 2026, Belift Lab announced that Heeseung would be departing from the group, citing differences in music direction. The label announced that he would be preparing to release a solo album with them, and that Enhypen would continue as a six-member group. His sudden departure surprised fans, who launched a Change.org petition urging the label to allow him to release a solo album while being a member of the group. The label reaffirmed on March 15 that he would not be returning to the group. On March 30, the initial dates for the group's fourth world tour, Blood Saga, were announced. On June 12, Enhypen announced that they will be releasing their fifth Japanese digital single "We'll Be Fine", on June 29. The music video for the single includes their animal mascots, known as Enchin. On June 26, a brand renewal film was released on YouTube, revealing new logos for the group. On August 21, the group released their eighth EP The Sin: Bliss, their first release as a six-piece ensemble. The EP became the group's first number-one entry on the Billboard 200, while lead single "Bloody Paradise" achieved their first "Grand Slam" on Korean music programs, winning on Show Champion, M Countdown, Music Bank, Show! Music Core and Inkigayo.

On October 25, 2026, it was announced that Enhypen would release the spinoff single The Sin: Parallel World as the third and final installment of The Sin series.

== Members ==
=== Current ===
- Jay (제이)
- Jake (제이크)
- Sunghoon (성훈)
- Sunoo (선우)
- Jungwon (정원) – leader
- Ni-Ki (니키)

=== Former ===
- Heeseung (희승)

== Artistry ==
=== Musical styles ===
According to The Korea Herald, Enhypen is known for their "polished pop sound", with writer Pyo Kyung-min considering their venture into hip-hop in the EP The Sin: Vanish a "new direction" for the group. On the other hand, Complex's Esperanza Rosenbaum said that the group's music "constantly" changes styles, identifying genres such as rock, retro pop, hip-hop, and Brazilian funk across their discography.

=== Concept aesthetics ===
Enhypen is known for their vampire-inspired concept, which also incorporates elements of dark fantasy and Greek mythology.

The manhwa and anime Dark Moon: The Blood Atlar is directly based off Enhypen's music, with several tie-in music videos. At a panel held at the 2026 San Diego Comic Con with the cast of Twilight, the group discussed how vampire stories endure across generations.

== Other ventures ==
=== Endorsements ===
In June 2021, Enhypen collaborated with a football-inspired lifestyle brand GOALSTUDIO on limited edition recovery slippers called En-Grab-Ity Balance through Weverse Shop. In the same month, the group was announced as the first global ambassadors of the French fashion brand Ami Paris. In October, Enhypen was announced as the new global models of Abib, a new Korean skincare brand.

In March 2022, Enhypen was appointed by Japanese footwear company ABC-Mart to be the face of its Nike Air Max promotions that year, including special benefits such as AR experiences and original stickers to those who purchase the INTRLK and EXCEE shoes via its online store. The group later modelled the Nike Oneonta Sandal and Air Rift for summer promotions, and endorsed Nike Manoa Leather Boots in the winter. In May, Enhypen was chosen as the 2022 Coke summer campaign artist for its "Coke X Music. Engrave the Magic of Summer" message, covering British rock band Queen's "A Kind of Magic" from their 1986 album of the same name on June 8 through Coke Studio. This was followed by their "Coca-Cola Zero X Enhypen" campaign in August. In early October, Enhypen was revealed as the face of BYS Cosmetics Philippines' "You Play You" campaign. They were selected as the new ambassador for Kolon Sports in the same month and modelled its 2022 Fall/Winter Collection and 2023 Spring/Summer Trekking Look Collection.

In May 2023, Enhypen was chosen by the Seoul Design Foundation and Seoul Metropolitan Government as the DDP public relations ambassador and opened Seoul Fashion Week as the Airbnb host. In June, Enhypen was announced as new brand ambassadors of the Italian luxury fashion house Prada. In July, Enhypen became global ambassadors of the Filipino clothing and lifestyle brand Bench. In August, the group teamed up with Indonesian food and beverage brand Nabati to promote their Goguma-flavored snacks. In September, Enhypen's Dark Moon: The Blood Altar collaborated with Lotte World Magic Island on a festival running from September 1 to October 22; visitors received character photocards and limited packages, as well as chance to experience a party room, merch pop-up store, photo zone, and limited Decelis Academy rental uniforms. The same month, Enhypen was named as ambassadors for 2023 Seoul Fashion Week, where they made their first appearance at the Prada Mode event. On October 30, Enhypen was named the first-ever global ambassador of Korean skincare brand Dr. Jart+, debuting their partnership in a new campaign called "Supercharged repair, Cicapair".

On January 31, 2024, Enhypen was chosen as the new model image of the Japanese mail-order retailer Peach John for their new spring unisex room wear as part of their 30th anniversary special project. On March 6, they were announced as brand ambassadors for Dunkin' Philippines. On April 30, with the reveal of their digital pictorial for W Korea's May issue showcasing Tiffany & Co. jewellery, members Jake and Sunghoon were announced as regional South Korea and Japan 'friends of the house' ambassadors for the luxury brand. Before their appointment, they had also been featured on the September 2023 cover of Cosmopolitan Korea in collaboration with Tiffany & Co. and had been attending the brand's events since then.

On February 19, 2025, Enhypen was announced as the new global ambassador of the skincare brand Mixsoon, with the campaign called "Beauty Essentials for Glass Skin". On June 17, the group was officially appointed as Seoul City Ambassadors for a two-year term to promote tourism and lifestyle to overseas audiences. In October, they were announced as the first ambassadors of Samyang Foods' MEP brand.

On February 26, 2026, Enhypen was announced as the Asia-Pacific regional ambassadors for mouthwash brand Listerine.

=== Philanthropy ===
In October 2024, Enhypen participated in a charity event for the fashion magazine W Korea's breast cancer awareness campaign "Love Your W".

In November 2025, Enhypen and Belift Lab donated 100 million KRW (around ₱4 million) through the Hope Bridge Korea Disaster Relief Association, in partnership with the Philippine Disaster Resilience Foundation, to support relief efforts for communities affected by the recent flooding in Philippines.

In January 2026, Enhypen worked with the Korean Red Cross in a campaign to promote blood donation. Registered donors would receive special gifts for their participation. Over the ten-day campaign period, the amount of first-time blood donors increased 19-fold.

== Discography ==
Korean albums

- Dimension: Dilemma (2021)
- Romance: Untold (2024)

Japanese albums

- Sadame (2022)

== Filmography ==
=== Film ===
Year	Title	Role	Notes	Ref.
2023	Baby Shark's Big Movie!	Underwater powerhouse K-pop band of Belugas	Voice role	

=== Television ===
Year	Title	Notes	Ref.
2020	I-Land	CJ ENM and Hybe Corporation survival show; 12 episodes	
2021	Playground	With TXT; Lunar New Year special variety show; two episodes	
2022	The Path We Take	2024 Winter Youth Olympics special broadcast	
2022	Enhypen TV	Japanese commemoration show for Dimension: 閃光	

=== Online shows ===
Year	Title	Notes	Ref.
2020–2021	Enhypen&Hi	Reality show; two seasons	
2021–present	EN-Core	Music show behind-the-scenes	
2021–present	EN-O'Clock	Variety show; premiered June 10, 2021	
2021	The Mini Olympics	Two episodes	
2021–2022	EN-log	Special weekly vlog series; two seasons	
2021–2022	Smash. School	Japanese weekly variety show; premiered November 29, 2021	
2022	Backstage	Special collaboration documentary with TXT	
2022	Mini Awards	2022 quarterly review; premiered March 31, 2022	
2022	EN-BTI	MBTI test and discussion of each member	
2022	Smash. Mystery	Japanese weekly variety show; premiered on June 13, 2022	
2022	So So Fun	Reality show; EN-O'Clock spin-off	
2023	K-Pop Generation	Documentary series on the lives of K-pop artists behind the cameras	

=== Other media ===
Year	Title	Notes	Members	Ref.
2020	Rookie of December	Radio DJs		
2021–2022	Enhypen's All Night Nippon X	Radio DJs	Ni-Ki	
2022	Listen	Radio DJs	Jungwon and Sunoo	
2026	Blood Diary	Spotify podcast		

== Concerts and tours ==
- Manifesto World Tour (2022–23)
- Fate World Tour (2023–24)
- Walk The Line World Tour (2024–25)
- Blood Saga World Tour (2026–)
