= List of awards and nominations received by Enhypen =

Enhypen awards and nominations
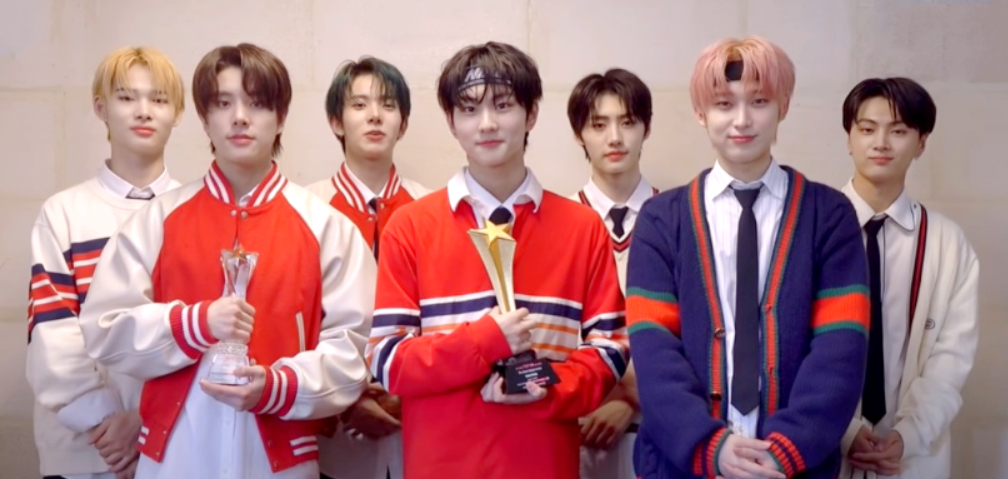
- Enhypen in October 2021
Awards and nominations
Award	Wins	Nominations
American Music Awards	0	1
Asia Artist Awards	2	6
Asian Pop Music Awards	1	1
Asia Star Entertainer Awards	3	3
Brand Customer Loyalty Awards	0	1
Brand of the Year Awards	0	1
Circle Chart Music Awards	3	9
D Awards	10	10
The Fact Music Awards	6	6
Genie Music Awards	0	1
Golden Disc Awards	8	19
Hanteo Music Awards	5	30
iHeartRadio Music Awards	0	3
Japan Gold Disc Award	2	2
Japan Record Awards	1	1
K-Global Heart Dream Awards	2	2
K-World Dream Awards	0	1
Korea First Brand Awards	0	1
Line News Awards	0	1
MAMA Awards	8	25
Melon Music Awards	2	3
Seoul Music Awards	4	19

Totals (Note: Certain award groups do not simply award one winner. They acknowledge several different recipients, have runners-up, and have third place. Since this is a specific recognition and is different from losing an award, runner-up mentions are considered wins in this award tally. For simplification and to avoid errors, each award in this list has been presumed to have had a prior nomination.)
- Wins: 59
- Nominations: 147

This is a list of awards and nominations received by South Korean boy band Enhypen, since their debut in 2020.

== Awards and nominations ==
Name of the award ceremony, year presented, award category, nominee(s) of the award, and the result of the nomination
Award ceremony	Year	Category	Nominee(s)/work(s)	Result	Ref.
American Music Awards	2026	Best Male K-Pop Artist	Enhypen	Nominated	
Asia Artist Awards	2021	Rookie of the Year – Music	Enhypen	Won	
Asia Artist Awards	2021	Best Artist Award – Music	Enhypen	Won	
Asia Artist Awards	2021	Male Idol Group Popularity Award	Enhypen	Nominated	
Asia Artist Awards	2021	U+ Idol Live Popularity Award	Enhypen	Shortlisted	
Asia Artist Awards	2022	Popularity Award – Singer	Enhypen	Nominated	
Asia Artist Awards	2026	Popularity Award – Group (Male)	Enhypen	Pending	
Asian Pop Music Awards (Note: Hosted by the Hong Kong Asia Pacific International Group and Sunway Records, the Asian Pop Music Awards bases its winners on "Asian Pop Music Chart" which opened in September 2019.)	2021	Best New Artist (Overseas)	Enhypen	Nominated	
Asia Star Entertainer Awards	2025	Album of the Year (Daesang)	Romance: Untold	Won	
Asia Star Entertainer Awards	2025	Top Touring Artist	Enhypen	Won	
Asia Star Entertainer Awards	2025	The Platinum Award	Enhypen	Won	
Asia Star Entertainer Awards	2026	Album of the Year (Daesang)	Desire: Unleash	Won	
Asia Star Entertainer Awards	2026	Artist of the Year (Daesang)	Enhypen	Won	
Asia Star Entertainer Awards	2026	The Platinum Award	Enhypen	Won	
Brand Customer Loyalty Awards	2021	Best Male Rookie Award	Enhypen	Nominated	
Brand of the Year Awards	2021	Rookie Male Idol Award	Enhypen	Nominated	
Circle Chart Music Awards	2020	New Artist of the Year – Physical	Border: Day One	Won	
Circle Chart Music Awards	2021	Album of the Year – 2nd Quarter	Border: Carnival	Nominated	
Circle Chart Music Awards	2021	Album of the Year – 4th Quarter	Dimension: Dilemma	Nominated	
Circle Chart Music Awards	2021	World Rookie of the Year	Enhypen	Won	
Circle Chart Music Awards	2022	Hot Performance of the Year	Enhypen	Won	
Circle Chart Music Awards	2022	Album of the Year – 1st Quarter	Dimension: Answer	Nominated	
Circle Chart Music Awards	2022	Album of the Year – 3rd Quarter	Manifesto: Day 1	Nominated	
Circle Chart Music Awards	2022	Song of the Year – January	"Polaroid Love"	Nominated	
Circle Chart Music Awards	2023	Artist of the Year – Physical Album	Orange Blood	Nominated	
D Awards	2025	Album of the Year (Daesang)	Romance: Untold	Won	
D Awards	2025	Delights Blue Label	Enhypen	Won	
D Awards	2025	Best Group	Enhypen	Won	
D Awards	2025	Best Tour	Enhypen	Won	
D Awards	2025	Best Popularity Award – Boy Group	Enhypen	Won	
D Awards	2026	Artist of the Year (Daesang)	Enhypen	Won	
D Awards	2026	Delights Blue Label	Enhypen	Won	
D Awards	2026	Best Group	Enhypen	Won	
D Awards	2026	Best Tour	Enhypen	Won	
D Awards	2026	Best Popularity Award – Boy Group	Enhypen	Won	
Genie Music Awards	2022	Best Male Performance Award	Enhypen	Nominated	
Golden Disc Awards	2021	Rookie Artist of the Year	Enhypen	Won	
Golden Disc Awards	2021	Curaprox Popularity Award	Enhypen	Nominated	
Golden Disc Awards	2021	QQ Music Popularity Award	Enhypen	Nominated	
Golden Disc Awards	2022	Seezn Most Popular Artist Award	Enhypen	Nominated	
Golden Disc Awards	2022	Album Bonsang	Dimension: Dilemma	Won	
Golden Disc Awards	2022	Album Daesang	Dimension: Dilemma	Nominated	
Golden Disc Awards	2023	Album Bonsang	Manifesto: Day 1	Won	
Golden Disc Awards	2023	Album Daesang	Manifesto: Day 1	Nominated	
Golden Disc Awards	2023	TikTok Most Popular Artist Award	Enhypen	Nominated	
Golden Disc Awards	2024	Album Bonsang	Dark Blood	Won	
Golden Disc Awards	2024	Album Daesang	Dark Blood	Nominated	
Golden Disc Awards	2025	Album Bonsang	Romance: Untold	Won	
Golden Disc Awards	2025	Album Daesang	Romance: Untold	Nominated	
Golden Disc Awards	2025	Global K-pop Artist	Enhypen	Won	
Golden Disc Awards	2025	Fans' Choice with Nongshim Shin Ramyun	Enhypen	Won	
Golden Disc Awards	2025	Most Popular Artist – Male	Enhypen	Nominated	
Golden Disc Awards	2026	Album Bonsang	Desire: Unleash	Won	
Golden Disc Awards	2026	Album Daesang	Desire: Unleash	Nominated	
Golden Disc Awards	2026	Most Popular Artist – Male	Enhypen	Nominated	
Hanteo Music Awards	2021	Initial Chodong Record Award	Dimension: Dilemma	Nominated	
Hanteo Music Awards	2021	Artist Award – Male Group	Enhypen	Nominated	
Hanteo Music Awards	2022	Artist of the Year (Bonsang)	Enhypen	Won	
Hanteo Music Awards	2022	WhosFandom Award	Enhypen	Nominated	
Hanteo Music Awards	2023	Artist of the Year (Bonsang)	Enhypen	Won	
Hanteo Music Awards	2023	WhosFandom Award	Enhypen	Nominated	
Hanteo Music Awards	2023	Global Artist Award – Africa	Enhypen	Nominated	
Hanteo Music Awards	2023	Global Artist Award – Asia	Enhypen	Nominated	
Hanteo Music Awards	2023	Global Artist Award – Europe	Enhypen	Nominated	
Hanteo Music Awards	2023	Global Artist Award – North America	Enhypen	Nominated	
Hanteo Music Awards	2023	Global Artist Award – South America	Enhypen	Nominated	
Hanteo Music Awards	2024	Artist of the Year (Bonsang)	Enhypen	Won	
Hanteo Music Awards	2024	Global Artist – Africa	Enhypen	Nominated	
Hanteo Music Awards	2024	Global Artist – Asia	Enhypen	Nominated	
Hanteo Music Awards	2024	Global Artist – Europe	Enhypen	Nominated	
Hanteo Music Awards	2024	Global Artist – North America	Enhypen	Nominated	
Hanteo Music Awards	2024	Global Artist – Oceania	Enhypen	Nominated	
Hanteo Music Awards	2024	Global Artist – South America	Enhypen	Nominated	
Hanteo Music Awards	2024	WhosFandom Award – Male	Enhypen	Nominated	
Hanteo Music Awards	2025	Best Performance (Daesang)	Enhypen	Won	
Hanteo Music Awards	2025	Artist of the Year (Bonsang)	Enhypen	Won	
Hanteo Music Awards	2025	Global Artist – Africa	Enhypen	Nominated	
Hanteo Music Awards	2025	Global Artist – Asia	Enhypen	Nominated	
Hanteo Music Awards	2025	Global Artist – Europe	Enhypen	Nominated	
Hanteo Music Awards	2025	Global Artist – North America	Enhypen	Nominated	
Hanteo Music Awards	2025	Global Artist – Oceania	Enhypen	Nominated	
Hanteo Music Awards	2025	Global Artist – South America	Enhypen	Nominated	
Hanteo Music Awards	2025	WhosFandom Award – Male	Enhypen	Nominated	
Hanteo Music Awards	2025	Best Popular Artist	Enhypen	Nominated	
Hanteo Music Awards	2025	Best Global Popular Artist	Enhypen	Nominated	
iHeartRadio Music Awards	2025	K-pop Artist of the Year	Enhypen	Nominated	
iHeartRadio Music Awards	2025	K-pop Song of the Year	"XO (Only If You Say Yes)"	Nominated	
iHeartRadio Music Awards	2025	Favorite K-pop Dance Challenge	"XO (Only If You Say Yes)"	Nominated	
Japan Gold Disc Award	2022	New Artist of the Year (Asia)	Enhypen	Won	
Japan Gold Disc Award	2022	Best 3 New Artists (Asia)	Enhypen	Won	
Japan Record Awards	2023	Special International Music Award	Enhypen	Won	
K-Global Heart Dream Awards	2023	K-Global Bonsang (Main Prize)	Enhypen	Won	
K-Global Heart Dream Awards	2023	K-Global Best Performance Award	Enhypen	Won	
K-World Dream Awards	2024	UPICK Popularity Award – Boy Group	Enhypen	Nominated	
Korea First Brand Awards	2022	Male Idol Rising Star Award	Enhypen	Nominated	
Line News Awards	2021	Most Talked People Award (Idol)	Enhypen	Nominated	
Melon Music Awards	2021	Global Rising Artist Award	Enhypen	Won	
Melon Music Awards	2021	New Artist of the Year	Enhypen	Nominated	
Melon Music Awards	2022	1theK Global Icon	Enhypen	Won	
MAMA Awards	2021	Best New Male Artist	Enhypen	Won	
MAMA Awards	2021	Worldwide Fans' Choice Top 10	Enhypen	Won	
MAMA Awards	2021	Worldwide Icon of the Year	Enhypen	Nominated	
MAMA Awards	2021	TikTok Artist of the Year	Enhypen	Nominated	
MAMA Awards	2021	TikTok Favorite Moment	Enhypen	Nominated	
MAMA Awards	2021	TikTok Album of the Year	Dimension: Dilemma	Longlisted	
MAMA Awards	2022	Worldwide Fans' Choice Top 10	Enhypen	Won	
MAMA Awards	2022	Worldwide Icon of the Year	Enhypen	Nominated	
MAMA Awards	2022	Best Male Group	Enhypen	Nominated	
MAMA Awards	2022	Best Vocal Performance – Group	"Polaroid Love"	Nominated	
MAMA Awards	2023	Worldwide Fans' Choice Top 10	Enhypen	Won	
MAMA Awards	2023	Worldwide Icon of the Year	Enhypen	Nominated	
MAMA Awards	2024	Album of the Year	Romance: Untold	Nominated	
MAMA Awards	2024	Artist of the Year	Enhypen	Nominated	
MAMA Awards	2024	Best Dance Performance Male Group	"Sweet Venom"	Nominated	
MAMA Awards	2024	Best Male Group	Enhypen	Nominated	
MAMA Awards	2024	Song of the Year	"Sweet Venom"	Nominated	
MAMA Awards	2024	Fans' Choice of the Year (Daesang)	Enhypen	Nominated	
MAMA Awards	2024	Worldwide Fans' Choice Top 10	Enhypen	Won	
MAMA Awards	2025	Fans' Choice of the Year (Daesang)	Enhypen	Won	
MAMA Awards	2025	Fans' Choice Male Top 10	Enhypen	Won	
MAMA Awards	2025	TELASA Favorite Global Artist	Enhypen	Won	
MAMA Awards	2025	Artist of the Year	Enhypen	Nominated	
MAMA Awards	2025	Best Male Group	Enhypen	Nominated	
MAMA Awards	2025	Album of the Year	Desire: Unleash	Nominated	
Seoul Music Awards	2021	Rookie of the Year	Enhypen	Won	
Seoul Music Awards	2021	K-wave Popularity Award	Enhypen	Nominated	
Seoul Music Awards	2021	Popularity Award	Enhypen	Nominated	
Seoul Music Awards	2022	Main Prize (Bonsang)	Border: Carnival	Won	
Seoul Music Awards	2022	Best Performance Award	Enhypen	Won	
Seoul Music Awards	2022	Popularity Award	Enhypen	Nominated	
Seoul Music Awards	2022	K-wave Popularity Award	Enhypen	Nominated	
Seoul Music Awards	2022	U+Idol Live Best Artist Award	Enhypen	Nominated	
Seoul Music Awards	2023	Main Prize (Bonsang)	Manifesto: Day 1	Nominated	
Seoul Music Awards	2023	K-wave Popularity Award	Enhypen	Nominated	
Seoul Music Awards	2023	Popularity Award	Enhypen	Nominated	
Seoul Music Awards	2024	Main Prize (Bonsang)	Orange Blood	Nominated	
Seoul Music Awards	2024	Popularity Award	Enhypen	Nominated	
Seoul Music Awards	2024	Hallyu Special Award	Enhypen	Nominated	
Seoul Music Awards	2025	Main Prize (Bonsang)	Enhypen	Won	
Seoul Music Awards	2025	Grand Prize (Daesang)	Enhypen	Nominated	
Seoul Music Awards	2025	K-Wave Special Award	Enhypen	Nominated	
Seoul Music Awards	2025	K-pop World Choice – Group	Enhypen	Nominated	
Seoul Music Awards	2025	Popularity Award	Enhypen	Nominated	
The Fact Music Awards	2020	Next Leader Award	Enhypen	Won	
The Fact Music Awards	2021	Artist of the Year (Bonsang)	Enhypen	Won	
The Fact Music Awards	2021	Fan N Star Choice Award (Artist)	Enhypen	Won	
The Fact Music Awards	2025	Artist of the Year (Bonsang)	Enhypen	Won	
The Fact Music Awards	2025	Icon of the Year (Daesang)	Enhypen	Won	
The Fact Music Awards	2025	Today's Choice	Enhypen	Won	
