= Suburban Secrets (film) =

2004 film

Suburban Secrets (aka: Lust for Laura)
- Cover to two-disc Special Edition DVD
- Directed by: Joe Sarno
- Written by: Joe Sarno
- Produced by: Michael Raso
- Starring: Isadora Edison; Tina Tyler; Kay Kirtland; John Samuel Jordan; Chelsea Mundae
- Cinematography: M.A. Morales
- Edited by: Brian McNulty
- Music by: Pink Delicates
- Production company: EI Independent Cinema
- Distributed by: EI Independent Cinema
- Release date: 2004
- Running time: 83 minutes (TV version); 153 minutes (director's cut)
- Country: United States
- Language: English

Suburban Secrets (US television title Lust for Laura) is a 2004 sexploitation and softcore adult film, written and directed by Joseph W. Sarno. The film stars Isadora Edison, Tina Tyler, Kay Kirtland, and Chelsea Mundae. Seduction Cinema regular A.J. Khan also appears, in a film where the director transposes the theme of his 1976 "classic" Misty into a modern-day environment.

The film was Sarno's last film (he died in 2010) and his first since 1990. According to William Grimes in The New York Times, it is "a film that harked back to his glory years" during which he helped "establish the sexploitation genre and break down the taboos against erotic content in American cinema".

== Plot ==
=== Overview ===
Laura, a nude model, returns to her small-town hometown after learning her ex-boyfriend has begun a relationship with her aunt Cynthia.

=== Synopsis ===
During a photo shoot, nude model Laura (Isadora Edison) receives a phone call from her sister Winnifred (Chelsea Mundae). Laura learns that her ex-boyfriend, high-powered attorney Nelson Nyland (John Samuel Jordan), is dating her aunt Cynthia (Tina Tyler); not only that, they are making plans to move in together. While she tells Winnie that's she's pleased, Laura is emotionally hurt.

After hanging up, Laura asks her photographer, Jennine (Andrea Davis), for a few weeks off. Jennine agrees, commenting that she has some good shots for her editor. Intercut with a montage of Laura and Jennine having sex, Jennine comments that she has "an awful schoolgirl crush" on Laura. Laura is initially put off, but then passionately kisses Jennine.

Meanwhile, in Meadow Springs, Nelson visits his law partner, and sister, Judith (Kay Kirtland). Judith invites Nelson out to a romantic dinner, but Nelson explains that he is expected by Cynthia.

At Cynthia's cabin, Nelson arrives to find Cynthia seductively rubbing herself. Making himself comfortable, Nelson approaches her from behind and cups her breasts. After several minutes of foreplay, they retire to the bedroom.

At a cafe, Winnie (Chelsea Mundae) asks her co-worker Louise (A.J. Khan) why she pushed Winnie so hard into telling Laura about Cynthia and Nelson. Louise admits that she is a potential novelist, and that she is writing an exposé about the town's sexual goings-on. The scene then intercuts with both Nelson and Cynthia, and Laura and Jennine having sex.

== Cast ==
- Isadora Edison as Laura Spencer
- Andrea Davis as Jennine
- Chelsea Mundae as Winnifred
- A.J. Khan as Louise
- Tina Tyler as Cynthia
- Kay Kirtland as Judith Nyland
- John Samuel Jordan as Nelson Nyland
- Brian Johnson as Johnson
- John Paul Fedele as O'Mera
- Justin Wingenfeld as Clem

== Production ==
Originally titled Lust for Laura, the film was written for Misty Mundae and Julian Wells. Mundae initially agreed, but in time backed out, wanting to get out of the porn industry. Wells left the project soon afterwards.

To replace his stars, producer Michael Raso turned to redhead Isadora Edison, who had made an impression on him in the film SpiderBabe. For the role of Cynthia, he wanted an older woman and turned to porn veteran Tina Tyler. Tyler had worked with Joe Sarno before, and enjoyed the script. Since the film dealt with incest, the first question Tyler asked was "are you sure the content is legal?" Sarno countered that as long as the actors weren't related, they should be fine.

As with most, if not all, of Joe Sarno's films, the sex scenes were written around the plot, instead of the plot written around the sex scenes.

=== DVD extras ===
The extras were spread over two DVD's.

The first DVD includes a ten-minute featurette titled “Inside Suburban Secrets” which shares comments and insights about the film from cast and crew.

The second DVD includes a film trailer for the project, as well as selection of trailers for other Joseph W. Sarno films, as well as two additional featurette's. The first is titled “Lake Placid Film Festival” as an in depth look at the festival, and the other one titled “Behind the Scenes” sharing more on set clips and comments from cast and crew. The principle DVD extra is the 82 minute television “Hot T.V. Cut” version.

Rounding out the extras are liner notes about Joseph W. Sarno and this film.

== Reception ==
DVD Verdict praised the film and concluded their analysis and review by writing it was "a worthy entry into Sarno's extensive filmography. He doesn't break new ground, but he does prove himself once again. Sometimes plodding and admittedly overlong, Suburban Secrets bristles often enough to make it a great softcore film."

10,000 Bullets praised Joseph W. Sarno, and wrote that the film "shows he still has what it takes to make" what they specifically refer to as "a soft core masterpiece." While acting was gently criticized, they also wrote the film "does feature some great performances from A.J. Khan and Isadora Edison." Toward the DVD and its including the shorter television version, they wrote "Even though it is cool that an alternate version of the film was included" they felt the "shorter version pales in comparison to Joseph W. Sarno’s director’s cut."

Plume Noire notes that the film assembled "a cast of regular people doing wild things" and writes "while lead actress Isadora Edison is fairly attractive, don't expect any model-types here, as from curvy and anorexic women to old people, you will get your fair share of realism," and also supposes that with his being past 70, viewers might assume that filmmaker Joe Sarno "lost his approach to sensuality", and agrees with their own supposition by writing "Suburban Secrets is a quite dull affair in general."

Exploitation Retrospect panned the film, decrying its packaging and promotion and calling the film itself lousy.
