= Bite Me =

Bite Me may refer to:

== Arts, entertainment, and media ==
=== Film and television ===
- Bite Me! (film), a 2004 horror film
- Bite Me (2019 film), an American romantic comedy film
- Bite Me, a 2016 comedy show written by Joanne McNally
- "Bite Me" (CSI), a sixth-season episode of the television series CSI: Crime Scene Investigation
- "Bite Me" (Charmed), a fourth-season episode of the television series Charmed
- "Bite Me", a sixth-season episode of the television series Medium

=== Music ===
- Bite Me (album), a 2025 album by Reneé Rapp
- "Bite Me" (Avril Lavigne song), 2021
- "Bite Me" (Enhypen song), 2023
- "Bite Me", a 1992 song by "Weird Al" Yankovic from Off the Deep End
- "Bite Me", a 2005 song by Electric Six from Señor Smoke
- "Bite Me", a 2023 song by Freya Ridings from Blood Orange
- "Bite Me", a 2010 song by Hocico from Tiempos de Furia
- Bite Me Tour (Avril Lavigne), also known as the Love Sux Tour, 2022–2023
- Bite Me Tour (Reneé Rapp), 2025–2026

=== Other uses in media ===
- Bite Me, a web series produced by Machinima

== See also ==
- Bite Me: A Love Story, a 2010 novel by Christopher Moore
- Bite Me: Narrative Structures and Buffy the Vampire Slayer, a 2003 Australian publication relating to the "Buffyverse"
- Bite Me! Chameleon, the English title of the Japanese manga Chameleon
