= Continue =

Continue may refer to:

- Continue (video gaming), an option to continue a video game after all the player's lives have been lost
- Continue (keyword), a programming language keyword
- Continue (film), a 2022 American drama film

== Music ==
- Continue, a 2008 album by Pakho Chau
- Continue (Wax album)
- ...Continued, the second album released by Tony Joe White
- Continue?, the debut extended play by Lun8
- Live Tour: Continues, a 2018 live album and tour by Gen Hoshino, or the title song
- Continue?, the second extended play in Chinese Football's game trilogy.
- "Continue?", a song by Kilo Kish from American Gurl (2022)

== See also ==
- European Parliament Committee on Budgetary Control, abbreviated CONT
- Continent (magazine), an online open access scholarly journal abbreviated as cont.
- Continuity (disambiguation)
- Continuation (disambiguation)
