= Lingerie (disambiguation) =

Lingerie is fashionable and notionally alluring undergarments.

Lingerie may also refer to:

- Lingerie (TV series), a softcore television series
- Lingerie (film), a 1928 American silent war drama film
- Emmanuel "Lingerie" DeAnda, singer with Pretty Ricky
- "Lingerie", a song by Lizzo from Cuz I Love You, 2019
- Lingeries, a 2001 eroge by Mink and a 2003 Japanese hentai, sometimes titled Office Lingeries, by Green Bunny
