= The Lord of the G-Strings: The Femaleship of the String =

2003 American erotic parody film

- Based on: The Lord of the Rings by J. R. R. Tolkien
- Written by: Terry M. West
- Directed by: Terry M. West
- Starring: Erin Brown; Darian Caine; A.J. Khan; Barbara Joyce; Michael R. Thomas; John Link; Anoushka; Allanah Rhodes; Suzi Lorraine; Paige Richards; Chelsea Mundane; Julian Wells
- Theme music composer: Josh Robinson
- Country of origin: United States
- Original language: English

Production
- Producers: John Bacchus; Michael Ruso
- Cinematography: John Paul Fedele
- Running time: 90 minutes
- Production company: E.I. Independent Cinema

Original release
- Release: 2003

The Lord of the G-Strings: The Femaleship of the String is a 2003 American made for cable erotic film written and directed by Terry M. West. A parodic film, it is based on the novel The Lord of the Rings by J. R. R. Tolkien. The film revolves around Dildo Saggins, a Throbbit, and other characters inspired by The Fellowship of the Ring: Queen Araporn, Ballem, etc; the plot mirrors the original story accordingly.

The cast includes Misty Mundae in the lead role.

== Reception ==
Although admitting that the film, a "picaresque road movie", "yields easily to the requirements of pornographic narrative" and includes "interminable footage of amateurs tramping in the wood", Ernest Mathijs found the production was not without merit. The film was also mentioned as an example of a type of "post-modern cult" [...] "embracing the viewers as savvy and discriminating insiders".

A review on the German website badmovies.de praised the production and its humour. A review at Flipside stated that the film was "just as dimwitted and juvenile as most of Seduction Cinema's other Hollywood movie parodies filled with girl-on-girl sex and rampant nudity. But like The Erotic Witch Project and Play-Mate of the Apes, has enough goofy charm to keep it from the trash heap where Seduction titles like The Sexy 6th Sense and Mummy Raider reside." A review by Vince Leo was more negative, stating that "It's all so silly, shot in the backwoods of New Jersey, and enhanced with some low-tech special effects, it has all of the look and feel of a bunch of Ren Faire enthusiasts and tech geeks getting together with a portable video camera (although this is shot on film) and making a spoof as a lark." and lamenting the film "lack[ed] quality sex scenes".

== See also ==
- Tolkien's impact on fantasy
