= Dark Moon: The Blood Altar =

Korean manhwa

DARK MOON: 달의 제단 RR: DARK MOON: Darui jedan MR: DARK MOON: Tarŭi chedan
- Genre: Dark fantasy; Urban fantasy; Teen romance
- Author: HYBE
- Illustrator: HYBE
- Publisher: Naver Webtoon (Korean); Line Webtoon (English); Yen Press (English)
- Original run: January 15, 2022
- Anime television series
- Directed by: Shōko Shiga
- Written by: Touko Machida
- Music by: Naoki "naotyu" Chiba
- Studio: Troyca
- Licensed by: Crunchyroll: SEA: Medialink
- Original network: Tokyo MX, BS11, GTV, GYT
- Original run: January 10, 2026 – March 28, 2026
- Episodes: 12

Dark Moon: The Blood Altar (Korean: DARK MOON: 달의 제단), also known in Japanese as Kuro no Tsuki: Tsuki no Saidan (黒の月: 月の祭壇) is a South Korean manhwa serialized online, written and illustrated by Hybe in collaboration with Naver Webtoon with an alternative storyline web novel on Wattpad. It ran from January 15, 2022, to August 12, 2023, consisting of 70 chapters.

Dark Moon: The Blood Altar is part of Project Dark Moon, a multimedia initiative by Hybe. It is the first installment of the Dark Moon series, consisting of Dark Moon: The Blood Altar, the prequels Dark Moon: Children of Vamfield and Dark Moon: The Blood of Vargr, the sequel Dark Moon: Two Moons, and the spin-off Dark Moon: The Grey City with the Japanese boy band &Team.

In 2023, an English print edition was published by Ize Press, with the Korean version published by Haksan Publishing. The characters and storyline are based on the South Korean boy band Enhypen and their music videos. The original story began with their "Drunk-Dazed" music video released on April 26, 2021. An anime television series adaptation produced by Troyca aired from January to March 2026.

== Plot ==
Sooha is a girl who has been forced to conceal her superhuman abilities to avoid being mistaken for a vampire. After being wrongfully accused of vampirism and blamed for her childhood friend's death, she enrolls in Decelis Academy, a night school said to bar entry to supernatural beings such as vampires and werewolves.

At the academy, Sooha meets Heli, a student who befriends her despite learning her secret, and is introduced to his close circle of friends, each secretly being a vampire and possessing unique powers. Though they try to protect her, the group is inexplicably drawn to her and willing to follow her wishes. When a recent murder linked to a vampire occurs, Sooha is drawn into a centuries-old conflict between vampires and the other most popular group at school, the werewolves. As tensions rise, she becomes entangled in the dangerous supernatural world she has long sought to avoid.

== Characters ==
=== Main characters ===
- Sooha

Voiced by: Fūka Izumi (Japanese); Elsie Lovelock (English)
The protagonist of Dark Moon: The Blood Altar. She is a human with supernatural strength that often makes people mistake her for a vampire. The discrimination she received due to that started her deep hatred towards vampires. She transferred to the tenth grade at the Decelis Academy.

==== The vampires ====
- Heli (based on Heeseung)

Voiced by: Kikunosuke Toya (Japanese); Kieran Flitton (English)
A vampire in the twelfth grade at the Decelis Academy and the captain and center of the Nightball Team. He has the ability of telepathy and is able to converse with others through his mind.
(Note: Heeseung left Enhypen in March 2026.)

- Solon (based on Enhypen's Sunghoon)

Voiced by: Jin Ogasawara (Japanese); Will de Renzy-Martin (English)
A vampire-werewolf hybrid in the tenth grade at the Decelis Academy and a forward of the Nightball Team. He keeps the fact that he is half werewolf from his vampire brothers.

- Jakah (based on Enhypen's Jungwon)

Voiced by: Yūto Uemura (Japanese); Steven Kelly (English)
A vampire in the ninth grade at Decelis Academy and the wing of the Nightball Team. He is the smartest among his brothers and has supernatural speed.

- Jaan (based on Enhypen's Jay)

Voiced by: Hiroto Shimizu (Japanese); Valentine Stokes (English)
A vampire in the eleventh grade at the Decelis Academy and the enforcer of the Nightball Team. He has supernatural strength.

- Shion (based on Enhypen's Sunoo)

Voiced by: Shun'ichi Toki (Japanese); Minh Ton (English)
A vampire in the tenth grade at the Decelis Academy and a back of the Nightball Team. He has the ability of manipulating others' minds, as well as gravity manipulation.

- Jino (based on Enhypen's Jake)

Voiced by: Shugo Nakamura (Japanese); Phillip Sacramento (English)
A vampire in the eleventh grade at the Decelis Academy and a back of the Nightball Team. He has pyrokinesis, the ability of manipulating and creating fire.

- Noa (based on Enhypen's Ni-Ki)

Voiced by: Chiaki Kobayashi (Japanese); Benji Buckley (English)
A vampire in the ninth grade at the Decelis Academy and a forward of the Nightball Team. He can control darkness and cast shadows.

=== Side characters ===
- Chris

Voiced by: Yuki Kaji (Japanese); Ciarán Strange (English)
A human and Sooha's childhood friend. Despite passing away at a young age, Sooha appeared to see him after transferring to the Decelis Academy.

==== The werewolves ====
- Khan (based on &Team's K)

Voiced by: Taihi Kimura (Japanese); Ricco Fajardo (English)

- Tahel (based on &Team's Taki)

Voiced by: Shōya Chiba (Japanese); Nicholas Andrew Louie (English)

- Najak (based on &Team's Nicholas)

Voiced by: Hayato Dojima (Japanese); Darrel J. Delfin (English)

- Enzy (based on &Team's EJ)

Voiced by: Shohei Komatsu (Japanese); Jesse Inocalla (English)

- Ruslan (based on &Team's Harua)

Voiced by: (Japanese); Caleb Yen (English)

- Camill (based on &Team's Jo)

Voiced by: (Japanese); Micah Solusod (English)

- Mahan (based on &Team's Fuma)

Voiced by: (Japanese); Yong Yea (English)

== Music ==
=== Memorabilia ===
Memorabilia is a special extended play (EP) by Enhypen, released on May 13, 2024. The physical album was issued in Moon, Vargr, and Decelis Academy editions, each containing themed merchandise tied to the Dark Moon: The Blood Altar universe.

==== Track listing ====
1. "One In A Billion" (2022)
2. "Criminal Love" (2023)
3. "Fatal Trouble" (2024)
4. "Teeth" (2024)
5. "Lucifer" (2024)
6. "Scream" (2024)

=== Other music ===
Enhypen have released multiple music videos as part of the Dark Moon: The Blood Altar universe.

- "Given-Taken" (2020)
- "Drunk‑Dazed" (2021)
- "Fever" (2021)
- "Tamed‑Dashed" (2022)
- "Blessed‑Cursed" (2022)
- "Future Perfect (Pass the MIC)" (2022)
- "One In A Billion" (2022)
- "Bite Me" (2023)
- "Criminal Love" (2023)
- "Fatal Trouble" (2024)
- "XO (Only If You Say Yes)" (2024)
- "No Doubt" (2024)
- "Bad Desire" (2025)
- "Knife" (2026)

== Series ==
| Title | Role | Plot summary |
|---|---|---|
| Dark Moon: The Blood Altar | Main series | Follows the story of Sooha and a group of vampires at Decelis Academy, exploring supernatural conflicts and the challenges of coexisting with humans. |
| Dark Moon: Children of Vamfield | Prequel | Focuses on the origins of the seven vampires. They grow up in an orphanage before discovering their hidden heritage and the secrets of the vampire world. |
| Dark Moon: The Blood of Vargr | Prequel | Focuses on the meeting of Princess Selen who tries to find a way to change the doomed future of the kingdom of Vargr and the seven knights trying to protect her. |
| Dark Moon: Two Moons | Sequel | Continues the events of The Blood Altar, introducing the mysterious girl Selen and further developing the relationships and conflicts within the vampire society. |
| Dark Moon: The Grey City | Spin-off | A prequel spin-off featuring a group of werewolf boys navigating new dangers in a seaside village. |

== Media ==
=== Webtoon and web novel ===
Dark Moon: The Blood Altar began publication on January 15, 2022, on the webtoon hosting services Naver and Line Webtoon. Simultaneously published alongside the webtoon, HYBE and Naver Webtoons co-planned the web novel edition on Wattpad in which the storyline differentiates from the Webtoon version.

=== Short Films ===
Three short films have been released in connection with the Dark Moon universe by ENHYPEN. The films serve as cinematic concept works that visually expand upon the narrative themes and lore of Dark Moon: The Blood Altar.

- Dark Blood Concept Trailer (2023) – directed by Yu Kwang Goeng
- Orange Blood Concept Trailer (2023) – directed by Yu Kwang Goeng
- Desire Concept Cinema (2024) – directed by Minsoo Park

=== Print ===
Ize Press published an English print edition of the webtoon Dark Moon: The Blood Altar on December 12, 2023. The Korean version was published by Haksan Publishing on December 15, 2023, as well as the webnovel on December 1, 2023. The German version was published by Manhwa Cult on June 6, 2024. The French version by Hugo Publishing and the Thai release by Amarin are set to be published soon.

=== Anime ===
An anime adaptation under the Japanese name Kuro no Tsuki: Tsuki no Saidan (黒の月: 月の祭壇) was announced during the Aniplex Online Fest event on September 16, 2024, which was later confirmed to be a television series produced by Troyca and directed Shōko Shiga, with scripts written by Touko Machida, characters designed by Masami Inomata, and music composed by Naoki "naotyu" Chiba. The series aired from January 10 to March 28, 2026, on Tokyo MX and other networks. (Note: Tokyo MX and BS11 listed the series premiere on January 9 at 24:00, which is effectively January 10 at midnight JST.) The opening theme song is "One In A Billion (Japanese Ver.)", while the ending theme songs are "CRIMINAL LOVE" and "Fatal Trouble", all performed by Enhypen. Crunchyroll is streaming the series. Medialink licensed the series for streaming on Netflix and Amazon Prime Video.

==== Episodes ====
| No. | Title | Directed by (Note: Production staff information is taken from the ending credits of each episode.) | Written by | Storyboarded by | Original release date |
|---|---|---|---|---|---|
| 1 | "New Moon -Meeting-"; Transliteration: "New Mōn -Deai-" (Japanese: New Moon -出会い-) | Masakiyo Inoue | Touko Machida | Shoko Shiga | January 9, 2026 |
Sooha, a young woman with superhuman strength, transfers to the prestigious Decelis Academy, a night school in the seaside city of Riverfield. She seeks a fresh start after being ostracized and falsely accused of being a vampire in her past. Upon her arrival, she encounters a group of seven popular and enigmatic boys—Heli, Jaan, Jino, Solon, Shion, Jakah, and Noa—who are the school's star Nightball players. Despite Sooha's deep-seated hatred for vampires, these seven boys, who are secretly vampires themselves, find themselves irresistibly and inexplicably drawn to her. The episode establishes the standard school life at Decelis, where classes begin at 9 PM and students are strictly forbidden from leaving after sunset for their own safety.
| 2 | "Crescent Moon – The Wolves Who Climbed Over the Wall -"; Transliteration: "Kuresento Moon – hei o koeta ōkami-tachi ichi" (Japanese: Crescent Moon -塀を越えた狼たち一) | Yuuki Nagasawa | Touko Machida | Masami Watanabe | January 16, 2026 |
| 3 | "Half Moon – The Pre-emptive Date -"; Transliteration: "Half Moon – nukegake dētō Half Moon -" (Japanese: Half Moon -抜け駆けデートー) | Yoshihiko Iwata | Rie Yokota | Masami Watanabe | January 23, 2026 |
| 4 | "Blood Moon – Night of the Total Eclipse -"; Transliteration: "Blood Moon – kaigigesshoku no yoru -" (Japanese: Blood Moon -皆既月食の夜-) | Jun Takahashi | Touko Machida | Jun Takahashi | January 30, 2026 |
| 5 | "Waxing Moon – Bite Me Neck -"; Transliteration: "Waxing Moon – ore no kubi o kande -" (Japanese: Waxing Moon – 俺の首を噛んで -) | Goichi Itō | Rie Yokota | Kanato Fukuzuki | February 6, 2026 |
| 6 | "Hunter's Moon – Birthday Party -"; Transliteration: "Hunter' s Moon – bāsudēpātī -" (Japanese: Hunter's Moon -バースデーパーティー -) | Mirai Minato & Yamato Ouchi | Touko Machida | Hidetoshi Yoshida | February 13, 2026 |
| 7 | "Blue Moon – That's Fate -"; Transliteration: "Burūmūn – sore ga unmei datte -" (Japanese: Blue Moon – それが運命だって -) | Yoshihiko Iwata | Rie Yokota | Royden B | February 20, 2026 |
| 8 | "Old Moon – Vampire Lord -"; Transliteration: "Old Moon – vu~anpaiarōdo -" (Japanese: Old Moon – ヴァンパイアロード -) | Jun Takahashi | Touko Machida | Kanato Fukuzuki | February 27, 2026 |
| 9 | "Misty Moon – The Black Mist of Railgun -"; Transliteration: "Misty Moon – rērugan no kokumu -" (Japanese: Misty Moon – レールガンの黒霧 -) | Yuuki Nagasawa | Rie Yokota | Hiroki Hayashi | March 6, 2026 |
| 10 | "Waning Moon – Mortal Combat in Autonal -"; Transliteration: "Waning Moon – ōtonaru no shitō -" (Japanese: Waning Moon -オートナルの死闘-) | Rima Utsurogi | Rie Yokota | Hidetoshi Yoshida | March 13, 2026 |
| 11 | "Hazy Moon – Vargr's Blood -"; Transliteration: "Hazy Moon – vu~aruga no chi -" (Japanese: Hazy Moon -ヴァルガの血-) | Yoshihiko Iwata | Touko Machida | Kanato Fukuzuki | March 20, 2026 |
| 12 | "Dark Moon – The Moon Altar -"; Transliteration: "Dāku Moon – tsuki no saidan -" (Japanese: Dark Moon -月の祭壇-) | Jun Takahashi | Touko Machida | Royden B | March 27, 2026 |

== Reception ==
Dark Moon: The Blood Altar is the most successful works among the HYBE Original Story Webtoons by HYBE and Naver. It exceeded 100 Million cumulative page views on Naver and is also highly evaluated in South Korea with a score of 9.78 out of 10. The webtoon ranked in the top five in the platform's chart in seven different language services including German, Spanish, French, Chinese and Indonesian, topping all Sunday series for 10 straight weeks. The Comic Book Resources similarly included the series in their "25 Top Manhwa You Need To Read".

== Collaborations ==
- A festival with the theme of 'Dark Moon: The Blood Altar' will be held at Lotte World from September 1 to October 22, 2023. Any visitor can enjoy the festival wearing a school uniform with Decelis Academy logo, which is the background in the webtoon, and experience Decelis banquet hall on the third floor of Magic Castle.
- E-Land's global SPA brand SPAO launched 'Dark Moon collection'. This collaborative collection features products such as pajamas, rugby tees, ball caps, and socks inspired by the logo of Decelis Academy, the school the main characters attend. SPAO Dark Moon Collection will first be released at SPAO offline stores on September 22, 2023, and will be available at SPAO online stores starting in October.
