= Erin Brown =

American actress

- Other names: Misty Mundae
- Occupation: Actress
- Years active: 1997–present

Erin Brown is an American actress. She has starred in over fifty low-budget films as Misty Mundae.

== Film career ==
=== Softcore porn ===
From 1997 to 2002, Brown worked for pornographic film production company Factory 2000. She signed an exclusive contract with E.I. Independent Cinema, performing mainly in softcore pornography under the stage name Misty Mundae. During this period, she also appeared (as Misty Mundae) in the 1999 hardcore film Vampire Strangler, alongside her then-boyfriend William Aprecino, known professionally as William Hellfire, who also directed the film.

In 2000, she traveled to Paris to film the U.S./French co-production Vampire of Notre Dame, which was later acquired and distributed by Seduction Cinema under the title An Erotic Vampire in Paris. Brown wrote, directed, and starred in a 2002 remake of the 1969 film Lustful Addiction. She also starred in the E.I. productions Misty Mundae: Mummy Raider (2002), SpiderBabe (2003), The Seduction of Misty Mundae (2005), The Erotic Diary of Misty Mundae, Sinful, The Girl Who Shagged Me, as well as Play-mate of the Apes (2002), Roxanna (2002), and Lord of The G-Strings (2004).

=== Horror films ===
In 1999, she appeared in a Columbine massacre-inspired B movie, Duck! The Carbine High Massacre, directed by Hellfire along with Joey Smack, who also acted in Vampire Strangler. After the directors were arrested for bringing weapons on school grounds, she bailed out Hellfire, who she was actively dating. She plays Misty in the 2002 film Mummy Raider, battling against an evil neo-Nazi scientist and an ancient mummy. In 2003, Brown began to perform in low-budget horror films produced by E.I. Independent Cinema's horror division Shock-O-Rama Cinema, such as The Screaming Dead, Bite Me!, Shock-O-Rama, and Chantal. At the 2006 New Jersey International Film and Screenplay Festival (later renamed the Hoboken International Film Festival), she was nominated for Best Actress, for her role in the psychological thriller Sinful.

Later in 2003, she appeared in CKY's music video for their song "Shock and Terror", directed by Bam Margera. In 2004, Brown released her short film Voodoun Blues direct-to-DVD through Shock-O-Rama Cinema. This film had won an award for best short film at her college film festival. Shortly after this, she sold her interest in the Misty Mundae name to E.I. Independent Cinema, left that company, and retired from softcore films to pursue mainstream acting.

Working as Erin Brown, she then performed in several independent horror films, such as Tony Todd's Shadow: Dead Riot, and The Lost, a film adaptation of Jack Ketchum's novel of the same name. She starred opposite Angela Bettis in "Sick Girl", a January 2006 episode of Showtime's Masters of Horror series. She and Homeward Band (her boyfriend's band) contributed music to "Sick Girl", but were not credited.

Sci Fi Weekly included Misty Mundae on "the list of living horror icons—the ones whose movies you might pay to see or rent, the ones you'd stand in line to shake hands with or to snag an autograph from", along with Robert Englund, Linda Blair, Malcolm McDowell, Elvira, and Jamie Lee Curtis, among others.

=== Later years ===
In 2005, E.I. Independent Cinema—since renamed Pop Cinema—announced its intent to continue releasing previously filmed softcore films starring Brown as Misty Mundae.

In August 2006, Brown was cast in a major role in The Rage, directed by Robert Kurtzman, which was released on DVD in 2008. In 2007, she had a supporting role in the independent film All Along, a romantic comedy written by and starring Bill Page. She also starred in the Polonia brothers' 2007 film Splatter Beach. In March 2007, she was cast in Dying God, directed by Fabrice Lambot, which was released in France in 2008.

In January 2008, Pop Cinema announced a limited convention tour to promote the release of An Erotic Werewolf in London. Brown appeared as Mundae to greet fans at such shows as Fangoria's Weekend of Horrors and Chiller Theatre. One month later, a two-DVD collector's edition of Vampire Strangler was released. In July 2008, Screamkings.com licensed the Misty Mundae name from Pop Cinema and announced the feature film Sculpture, the first feature film to star Brown as Misty Mundae since the 2005 Shock-O-Rama.

In 2009, she began appearing in the Cinemax TV series Lingerie as Stephanie.

In 2012, Lukas Persson directed This Girl's Gun, a post-apocalyptic western short starring Brown, which won her the best actress award at the 2012 PollyGrind Film Festival.

In 2016, she starred alongside actor/director Sean Weathers in the crime mystery The New York Butcher.
