= Continuation (disambiguation) =

Continuation is a concept in computer science.

Continuation may also refer to:

== Arts and entertainment ==
- Continuation (sculpture), a 2009 series of sculptures in Portland, Oregon, US
- Continuation (album), by Philip Bailey, 1983
- Continuation, a 2009 album by Alex Cline
- Continu/ation, a volume of The Early Years 1965–1972 by Pink Floyd
- The Continuation, a 2009 album by Deathgaze

== Other uses ==
- Analytic continuation, in complex analysis
- Numerical continuation, to compute approximate solutions of a system of non-linear equations
- Continuation, a type of continuing patent application

== See also ==
- Continue (disambiguation)
- Continuation War, the Finno-Soviet conflict during World War II
- Continuation car, a replica of a vehicle no longer in production by the original automaker
- Continuation novel, a sequel novel by a new author, with continuity in the style of an established series
