= SpiderBabe =

2003 American erotic film

- SpiderBabe poster
- Based on: Characters appearing in Spider-Man by Marvel Comics
- Written by: John Paul Fedele; Terry West
- Directed by: Johnny Crash
- Starring: Misty Mundae; Julian Wells; Darian Caine; Adam Cox
- Theme music composer: Rachel Brune; Brooke Montgomery
- Country of origin: United States
- Original language: English

Production
- Producers: John Bacchus; Michael Raso
- Cinematography: M.A. Morales
- Editor: Johnny Crash
- Running time: 89 minutes

Original release
- Release: October 14, 2003

SpiderBabe is a 2003 American erotic superhero film. It is loosely based on the character Spider-Man created by Stan Lee and published by Marvel Comics. The film was written by John Fedele and Terry West, and directed by Johnny Crash. Erin Brown, credited as Misty Mundae, stars as the title character.

== Plot ==
Patricia Porker is a shy New Jersey high school girl whose life is changed forever when she is bitten by a genetically-engineered spider and turns into a wall-climbing beauty with superhuman strength and the ability to shoot webs from her vagina. Calling herself SpiderBabe, she uses her newfound powers to enter a wrestling contest and win enough money to move out of her Uncle Flem and Aunt Maybe's home and into her own apartment with best friend Lisa Knoxx.

A robber murders Uncle Flem and inspires Patricia to use her newfound powers to battle crime in New York City, while she also tries to tell her best friend Mark Wetson that she wants to be his girlfriend and has copious amounts of lesbian sex. Meanwhile, Lisa's ambitious lesbian sister, Lucinda Knoxx, uses the same genetic engineering techniques that Patricia's science teacher, Dr. Dowell, had used on a spider on herself, and gains a villainous alter-ego, the sexy and evil genius Femtilian. Femtilian sets out on a quest for world domination that can only be resolved in a head-to-head showdown with SpiderBabe.

== Cast ==
- Misty Mundae - Patricia Porker/SpiderBabe
- Julian Wells - Lucinda Knox/Femtilian
- Darian Caine - Lisa Knox
- Shelby Taylor - Queen Bee
- Michael R. Thomas - Dr. Dowell
