= Duck! The Carbine High Massacre =

- DVD cover
- Directed by: William Hellfire; Joey Smack
- Written by: William Hellfire; Joey Smack; Todd Russell; Mick Leo
- Produced by: William Hellfire; Joey Smack; Todd Russell
- Starring: William Hellfire; Joey Smack; Erin Brown
- Cinematography: William Hellfire; Joey Smack
- Edited by: Lou Cifer
- Production company: Factory 2000
- Distributed by: Shriek Show
- Release date: October 26, 1999 (USA)
- Running time: 101 minutes
- Country: United States
- Language: English
- Budget: $3,000
- Box office: $6,034

Duck! The Carbine High Massacre is a 1999 American teen black comedy crime film about a school shooting. Released just over six months after the Columbine High School massacre event, it was written, produced and directed by William Hellfire and Joey Smack, who also starred. After the film was released, Hellfire and Smack were arrested for possession of weapons on school property. The film is said to have helped pay for Hellfire's legal fees.

== Plot ==
Derwin and Derick are trench coat-wearing neo-Nazis from deprived families. They find a website selling top secret missiles and order one with the credit card of Derick's mother. The next day at school they encounter the school janitor who warns them of their unusual wardrobe. They launch the missile the following day, but discover it is a dud. While walking home, Derwin is assaulted by jocks and left in critical condition where the janitor finds him. He and Derick both fail their presentation on the topic of the internet due to Derwin's absence. They then form a plan to kill students at their school and then commit suicide with the janitor’s offered assistance. The pair buy two shotguns and several handguns from a black market dealer next door to a heavy metal band concert. He also offers them cocaine and sexual intercourse with an underage girl being held hostage, which they refuse. The next day the janitor arrives first with a propane bomb and leaves it in the cafeteria. Derwin and Derick appear and open fire in the cafeteria, killing several people before going to the basement where they simultaneously kill each other. The two die holding hands. A police officer and the school principal enter the school to find a bomb that was placed there by the janitor. While the policeman attempts to defuse it, the janitor is seen running away to safety before the policeman accidentally sets the bomb off. The aftermath involves the parents along with a teacher and the principal sharing their thoughts on Derwin and Derick as well as the victims. A scientist then expresses his theory of violence influence as a motive, hinting the janitor was indeed the third shooter.

== Cast ==
- William Hellfire as Derwin
- Joey Smack as Derick
- Misty Mundae as Bible Girl
- Lilly Tiger as Play Girl
- Chris Perez as Car Kid
- Henry Krinkle as Retard
- Michael Ovum as Spam Jock
- Ryan Trimmer as Benchpress
- Kendall "Shorty" Ward as Afro-American
- Mazur as Song Girl
- Mike Roser as Goth Boy
- Liz Bathory as Goth Girl
- Michael Lema as No Info Boy
- Larry Wellman as The Principal
- Rodney Sleurtols as The Janitor
- Karl Pitt as Policeman

== Production ==
Duck, along with other Factory 2000 films was edited in Adobe Premiere and shot on consumer-level VHS cameras including a broadcast Super VHS camcorder, a standard handheld RCA (specifically for filming multiple angles of the concert scene), and another unidentified camcorder. The film saw its first DVD release in 2004 along with minor color corrections. The film was produced with $3,000 and an inexperienced cast. Unlike previous films from Factory 2000, this film was based upon an actual event, and not mainly focused on fetishes. People who worked on the film received death threats. Director William Hellfire said that due to the painkillers he was using to treat his cancer pain, "Like I don't remember most of Duck!, I don't remember... I shot all these films in a semi-subconscious, drugged-out, zombified state. I had no remorse nor regard for anything" [sic].

Joe Bob Briggs, writing for United Press International, speculated on the filmmaker's motivations, writing "If I had to guess, it was put together by some friends who have spent their whole lives being called "freaks"—punk kids, goth kids, headbangers—and so wanted to point out a few things that might have motivated the suicidal mass murderers". [sic]

It took several years for the film to be distributed, because of the controversial subjects. After a message in the film's beginning mentions how offensive it is, it then says "...it was bound to become a motion picture eventually, or even worse, a 'made for TV' movie. So we decided to do it first".

== Reception ==
Joe Bob Briggs of United Press International wrote that although he had read multiple editorials bemoaning the filmmakers’ poor taste in beginning production of their satirical comedy parody within four months of the Columbine massacre, he had difficulty in finding a copy. When finally tracking it down, and finding the acting horrible and the soundtrack shaky, he wrote it was "eerie and powerful -- IF you can get through it". He found the film's gore effects to be "outstanding", and wrote that the film shared "a final sequence that is gruesome, shocking, sad, frightening, bloody as hell, and -- at the moment of truth -- beautiful."

From the Arthouse to the Grindhouse offered that this film was the pinnacle of the filmmakers’ achievements at that time in that it was a "kick in the balls" to the "media hypocrisy" surrounding the Columbine events. They also noted the filmmakers’ having been arrested shortly after the film's release for taking guns onto school property.

Peep Shows: Cult Film and the Cine-Erotic offered that the film was "deliberately provocative and controversial," while Arkansas Democrat-Gazette called the film "blatantly exploitative", noting further that it was a "low budget direct-to-video 'spoof' thrown together mere weeks after the massacre".

DVD Talk referred to the film as an "ultra-controversial Columbine satire", while Film Threat both panned and praised the film, writing "by conventional standards, the entire project is in incredibly bad taste. And most people are going to be repulsed by the comedic treatment of such gut-wrenching subject matter. But, these dudes just don’t care! And they score big points on attitude alone."

Jason Buchanon of AllRovi offered that the film wasn't "nearly as offensive as one might imagine" and that "the sub-Troma quality of the production and performances by the majority of the cast ultimately prevent Duck! from being taken as seriously as it could be with a bit more polish, this is also what makes it infinitely less objectionable than it could be had the filmmakers went for a grander scale."

== Release ==
The film was released on VHS tape by Shock O’ Rama Cinema In 2000. The DVD was released by Shriek Show in 2004. The disc includes special features: deleted scenes, Court TV footage, a concert, interviews, a production gallery, trailers and others. The film was released on Blu-ray on 2021 by Saturn's Core Audio & Video in collaboration with Vinegar Syndrome.
