= Dark Blood (EP) =

2023 EP by Enhypen

- Digital cover

EP by Enhypen
- Released: May 22, 2023
- Genres: K-pop; hip-hop
- Length: 18:13
- Labels: Belift Lab; Genie Music; Stone Music
- Producers: Wonderkid; Cirkut; Jason Evigan; Theo & The Climb; Tido Nguyen; Waveshower

Enhypen chronology
Sadame (2022)	Dark Blood (2023)	Orange Blood (2023)

Singles from Dark Blood
- 1. "Bite Me" Released: May 22, 2023

Dark Blood is the fourth extended play (EP) by South Korean boy group Enhypen. It was released on May 22, 2023, through Belift Lab. The album consists of six tracks, including the lead single "Bite Me". The theme of the EP is heavily influenced by the group's fantasy webtoon series Dark Moon: The Blood Altar, which features vampire characters based on the seven group members.

== Background and release ==
On April 24, 2023, Belift Lab announced that Enhypen would be releasing their fourth extended play, Dark Blood, on May 22. This comes ten months after their the release of their third EP, Manifesto: Day 1 and three months after the wrap-up of their first international tour. The track list was later revealed on May 16 and an album preview was released on May 18. On the day of the release, the group held a media showcase for the album in Seoul.

Described by group member Heeseung as having an "unconventional" sound, the album has a vampire theme, in line with their webtoon series, Dark Moon: The Blood Altar. Referencing the series, group member Jake commented that "with many connections between the webtoon and our album, paying attention to these aspects will definitely make the listening experience more fun".

== Critical reception ==
Professional ratings
Review scores
Source	Rating
AllMusic	3.5/5 stars
NME	4/5 stars

The album received generally positive reviews from critics. Neil Z. Yeung from AllMusic gave the album 3.5 out of five stars, writing that Enhypen "slow it down, boost the low end, and amplify the menace". Tássia Assis from NME gave the album four out of five stars, writing that "musically, this might be Enhypen's most cohesive work so far." Paste ranked it number 13 in their list of The 20 Best K-pop Albums of 2023, calling it a "hypnotic, story-driven effort that sinks its teeth in with exactly the kind of addictive refrain that the group's become best known for". They named "Bite Me" the "glittery centerpiece, a monstrous mix of teen vampire lore and late nineties/early noughties boy-band appeal."

== Commercial performance ==
On South Korea's Hanteo Chart, Dark Blood sold more than 1.1 million copies on its first day alone, surpassing the sales of their previous EP. Despite the two-week shipment delay in the US, Dark Blood became Enhypen's fifth top 10 entry on the Billboard Top Album Sales chart, and their first ever top five entry on the Billboard 200.

According to the International Federation of the Phonographic Industry (IFPI)'s Global Music Report for 2023, Dark Blood was the sixteenth best-selling album worldwide, having sold 1.7 million units. (Note: The IFPI Global Albums chart ranks, in order, the albums that generated the most money globally across streaming, download, and physical record sales (combined) in a calendar year. The Global Album Sales Chart measures global unit sales across all physical formats, as well as full album downloads.)

== Track listing ==
Dark Blood track listing
No.	Title	Writer(s)	Producer(s)	Length
1.	"Fate"	Wonderkid; Hybe; Ca$hcow; Shinkung; BreadBeat; Kyler Niko; "Hitman" Bang; Jacob Aaron (The Hub); Noerio (The Hub); The Hub 88	Wonderkid	2:31
2.	"Bite Me"	Henry Walter; David Stewart; Jason Evigan; Lourdiz; Supreme Boi	Cirkut; Jason Evigan	2:37
3.	"Sacrifice (Eat Me Up)"	Wonderkid; "Hitman" Bang; Andy Love; Jo Yoon-kyung; Alexander Karlsson; Matt Thomson; Max Lynedoch Graham; Yejune Synn (Snnny); Kim Jae-won (Jam Factory); Deeno (Snnny); Jeon Ji-eun (January 8th (Lalala Studio)); Josh McClelland; Hero (Snnny)	Wonderkid	3:22
4.	"Chaconne"	Elsa Curran; Tony Ferrari; Matthew Robert Crawford; Aaron Theodore Berton; January 8th; "Hitman" Bang	Theo & The Climb	3:33
5.	"Bills"	Tido Nguyen; Ryan Curtis; Sophie Hintze; Kim Su-ji (Lalala Studio); "Hitman" Bang; Rum (MUMW); Y0ung (MUMW); Shinkung	Tido Nguyen	2:55
6.	"Karma"	Andy Love; Waveshower; "Hitman" Bang; January 8th	Waveshower	3:12
Total length:				18:13

== Accolades ==
Awards and nominations for "Dark Blood"
Award ceremony	Year	Category	Result	Ref.
Golden Disc Awards	2024	Album Bonsang	Won	

Music program awards
Song	Program	Date	Ref.
"Bite Me"	M Countdown	June 1, 2023	
"Bite Me"	Music Bank	June 2, 2023	

== Charts ==
=== Weekly charts ===
Weekly chart performance for Dark Blood
Chart (2023)	Peak position
Austrian Albums (Ö3 Austria)	8
Belgian Albums (Ultratop Flanders)	7
Belgian Albums (Ultratop Wallonia)	4
Dutch Albums (Album Top 100)	32
French Albums (SNEP)	2
German Albums (Offizielle Top 100)	9
Greek Albums (IFPI)	2
Hungarian Albums (MAHASZ)	2
Italian Albums (FIMI)	56
Japanese Albums (Oricon)	1
Japanese Combined Albums (Oricon)	1
Japanese Hot Albums (Billboard Japan)	1
Lithuanian Albums (AGATA)	72
Polish Albums (ZPAV)	8
Portuguese Albums (AFP)	3
South Korean Albums (Circle)	1
Spanish Albums (Promusicae)	32
Swedish Physical Albums (Sverigetopplistan)	5
Swiss Albums (Schweizer Hitparade)	5
UK Album Downloads (Official Charts)	70
US Billboard 200	4
US World Albums (Billboard)	2

=== Monthly charts ===
Monthly chart performance for Dark Blood
Chart (2023)	Position
Japanese Albums (Oricon)	2
South Korean Albums (Circle)	2

=== Year-end charts ===
Year-end chart performance for Dark Blood
Chart (2023)	Position
Belgian Albums (Ultratop Flanders)	152
French Albums (SNEP)	164
Hungarian Albums (MAHASZ)	78
Japanese Albums (Oricon)	32
Japanese Hot Albums (Billboard Japan)	35
South Korean Albums (Circle)	20
US World Albums (Billboard)	11

== Certifications and sales ==
Certifications for Dark Blood
Region	Certification	Certified units/sales
Japan (RIAJ)	Gold	100,000^{^}
South Korea (KMCA)	Million	1,000,000^{^}
Summaries
Worldwide (IFPI)	—	1,700,000
^{^} Shipments figures based on certification alone.
