= Bite Me! (film) =

- Directed by: Brett Piper
- Written by: Brett Piper
- Produced by: Jeffrey Faoro; Michael Raso
- Starring: Misty Mundae; Julian Wells; Rob Monkiewicz; Erika Smith
- Cinematography: M.A. Morales
- Edited by: Brett Piper
- Music by: Jon Greathouse
- Production company: E.I. Independent Cinema
- Distributed by: E.I. Independent Cinema; Shock-O-Rama Cinema
- Release date: October 26, 2004
- Running time: 85 minutes
- Country: United States
- Language: English

Bite Me! is a 2004 horror film written and directed by Brett Piper and starring Misty Mundae, Julian Wells, Rob Monkiewicz, and Erika Smith. The plot is about mutant insects in a strip club.

== Plot ==
A drug deal gone bad results in biologically engineered marijuana being delivered to the Strip-O-Sauraus, a run-down strip club known for giant dinosaur statues in its parking lot. Club owner Ralph Vivino (Michael R. Thomas) is worried over its appearance, because if anything goes wrong at the club on his watch, his rival will take his job. Cockroaches fed on the tainted pot and mutate to become bloodthirsty, giving Ralph and the club's dancers, Crystal (Misty Mundae), Teresa (Julian Wells), and Trix (Erika Smith) immediate problems as the bugs infest the club, sucking blood and causing mayhem. Ralph calls an ineffectual exterminator, "Buzz" O'Reilly (Rob Monkiewicz), who then enlists the help of Crystal who has received a nasty bug bite. Buzz's strongest chemicals cannot stop the carnivorous insects and the entire club falls under attack. A DEA agent arrives to destroy both the shipment and the mutated bugs, but unwittingly helps the bugs mutate further.

== Partial cast ==
- Misty Mundae as Crystal
- Julian Wells as Teresa
- Rob Monkiewicz as Terence "Buzz" O'Reilly
- Erika Smith as Trix
- Michael R. Thomas as Ralph Vivino
- Caitlin Ross as Amber
- Sylvianne Chebance as Gina
- John Paul Fedele as Myles McCarthy
- Carl Burrows as Eugene Frack
- David Fine as Frack's Cohort
- Justin Wingenfeld as Rupert
- Chris Mimikos as Herschel

== Production ==
The project was filmed from November through December 2003 in New York City.

== Reception ==
In his review of the film, Jack Sommersby of eFilmCritic offered that "in light of its undeniably campy premise, it is most successful as a goofy little comedy with (mostly) incorrigible characters." and concluded that "If anything, it deserved a theatrical release a whole lot more than Anaconda". G. Noel Gross of DVD Talk made comparisons to the work of Ray Harryhausen offering that the film was an "equally amusing stop-motion throwback" and wrote of the director "Mr. Piper shows off his meticulous handiwork".

Larry Clow of The Wire wrote that "[the film] is a fun, cheesy bit of cinema that embraces its low-budget roots while striving to be more than an average B-movie." He praised Piper's direction and included that "the whole cast manages to be pretty funny and, at times, clever — a remarkable feat". He summarized by opining that the film "is a good way to spend a lazy Sunday afternoon and is worth a rental."
