= Dimension: Dilemma =

2021 studio album by Enhypen

- Digital and "Odysseus" version cover

Studio album by Enhypen
- Released: October 12, 2021
- Recorded: 2021
- Genres: EDM; R&B; hip hop; pop rock; alternative rock; electro-funk
- Length: 22:14
- Languages: Korean; English
- Labels: Belift Lab; Genie Music; Stone Music
- Producers: Wonderkid; "Hitman" Bang; Shinkung; Joacim Persson; LDN Noise; Frants

Enhypen chronology
Border: Carnival (2021)	Dimension: Dilemma (2021)	Manifesto: Day 1 (2022)

Singles from Dimension: Dilemma
- 1. "Tamed-Dashed" Released: October 12, 2021

Repackage album cover
- Digital cover

Singles from Dimension: Answer
- 1. "Blessed-Cursed" Released: January 10, 2022

Dimension: Dilemma is the debut studio album by South Korean boy band Enhypen. It was released on October 12, 2021, through Belift Lab. The album consists of eight tracks, including the lead single "Tamed-Dashed".

The reissue of the album, Dimension: Answer, was later released on January 10, 2022. It contains three new tracks proceeding the interlude, including the lead single "Blessed-Cursed" and "Polaroid Love", which was previously performed on November 19, 2021 at the En-Connect: Companion concert.

== Background and release ==
On August 25, 2021, Belift Lab confirmed that Enhypen would make their comeback at the end of September. On September 2, the agency announced that members Heeseung, Jay, Jake, Sunghoon, and Jungwon tested positive for COVID-19. Member Ni-ki also tested positive three days later. On September 16, Belift Lab announced the members had recovered and that their first full-length album, Dimension: Dilemma, would be released on October 12, following the release of a concept trailer titled "Intro : Whiteout", uploaded on September 17.

On December 9, 2021, Belift confirmed that Enhypen would release a repackage of Dimension: Dilemma titled Dimension: Answer.

== Commercial performance ==
The first single "Tamed-Dashed" debuted at number one on the Japan Billboard Hot 100 chart with 386,142 copies sold on its first week, making it their first number one in the country and the hightest charting single of the album and it was certified two-times Platinum in RIAJ Japan. And it debuted at number 11 on the Billboard US World Digital Songs Sales. In Korea the song debuted at 110 on Circle songs chart. Second single "Blessed Cursed" debuted at number 184 on the Billboard Global Excl US chart, and number 32 on the Japan Hot 100. It debuted at 114 on the Circle songs chart in Korea.

The song "Polaroid Love" had success on the charts, it debuted at number 20 on the Billboard Philippines Songs. It had success in Asian countries reaching the top ten in Malaysia, Singapore and top 20 in Indonesia Billboard songs chart, and top forty in Vietnams Hot 100 chart. In the United States, it debuted at number 9 on the Billboard World Digital Songs Sales chart, and number 122 in Circle songs chart Korea.

On September 23, it was announced that the album pre-orders had surpassed 600,000 copies in six days. By October 7, pre-orders surpassed 910,000 copies. The album sold 501,748 copies on the first day following its release on the Hanteo charts and also topped the Oricon Daily Album Chart in Japan for two days in a row. On October 25, Dimension: Dilemma debuted at number 11 on Billboard 200 chart, surpassing their previous career high with Border: Carnival, which peaked at number 18. As of November 2021, Dimension: Dilemma has sold over 1.1 million copies on Gaon, becoming Enhypen’s first-ever million-selling album and receiving a million certification from the Korea Music Content Association (KMCA) in December.

On January 8, 2022, it was revealed that pre-orders for Dimension: Answer had surpassed 630,000 copies. The lead single, "Blessed-Cursed", became the group's first song to peak at number one on Gaon Download Chart. The album itself placed first on both the Gaon Album Chart and Oricon Albums Chart, making it Enhypen's third consecutive album to top the latter. Dimension: Answer also appeared in the top 20 of the Billboard 200 at number 13 and became the group's third consecutive number-one on the Billboard World Albums chart.

== Track listing ==
Dimension: Dilemma track listing
No.	Title	Writer(s)	Producer(s)	Length
1.	"Intro: Whiteout"	Wonderkid; Hybe	Wonderkid	1:39
2.	"Tamed-Dashed"	"Hitman" Bang; Wonderkid; Lil 27 Club; Caesar & Loui; Moa "Cazzi Opeia" Carlebecker; Alexander Karlsson; Tim Tan; Ciara Muscat; Sam Klempner; Softserveboy; Carly Lyman	"Hitman" Bang; Wonderkid	3:16
3.	"Upper Side Dreamin'"	Wonderkid; "Hitman" Bang; Kyler Niko; Shinkung; Anna Timgren; Justin Reinstein; Sebastian Simon Ivanov; Danke (Lalala Studio); Jang Yeo-jin (Lalala Studio); TWLV; Kang Eun-jeong	Wonderkid; "Hitman" Bang; Shinkung	3:09
4.	"Just a Little Bit" (몰랐어; Mollass-eo [lit. 'I didn't know'])	Joacim Persson; Johan Alkenäs; Andy Love; Danke (Lalala Studio); "Hitman" Bang; Punch; Jxxdxn; Mot Mal (Lalala Studio)	Joacim Persson; "Hitman" Bang; Shinkung	2:47
5.	"Go Big or Go Home" (모 아니면 도; Mo animyeon do [lit. 'All or Nothing'])	Greg Bonnick; Hayden Chapman; Adrian McKinnon; "Hitman" Bang; Sacco; Alma Goodman; Alida Garpestad Peck; Parker James; January 8th; Lee Yi-jin; Lee Seu-ran; Jung Jin-woo	LDN Noise	3:21
6.	"Blockbuster" (액션 영화처럼; Aegsyeon yeonghwacheoreom [lit. 'Like an action movie']; featuring Yeonjun of TXT)	Greg Bonnick; Hayden Chapman; Adrian McKinnon; Jeremy "Tay" Jasper; Dylan Huling; Lee Yi-jin; Yeonjun; Lee Seu-ran; Danke (Lalala Studio)	LDN Noise	3:47
7.	"Attention, Please!"	Frants; Mok Ji-min; Wonderkid; January 8th; Steven Lee; Sqvare; Alexander Karlsson; Lee Seu-ran; Max Lynedoch Graham; Matt Thomson; Gabriel Brandes; Jessica Eunjoo; Hobyn "K.O" Yi	Frants; Wonderkid	2:47
8.	"Interlude: Question"	Wonderkid; Shinkung; Puff; Hybe	Wonderkid	1:24
Total length:				22:14

Dimension: Answer bonus tracks
No.	Title	Writer(s)	Producer(s)	Length
9.	"Blessed-Cursed"	"Hitman" Bang; Alexander Karlsson; Charlotte Wilson; Ciara Muscat; Frants; Gabriel Brandes; Jacob Aaron; Lil 27 Club; Moa "Cazzi Opeia" Carlebecker; Ronnie Icon; Softserveboy; Sqvare; Tim Tan; Wonderkid; Worawat Deeudomchan; Shinkung	Wonderkid; Frants; Shinkung	2:50
10.	"Polaroid Love"	"Hitman" Bang; January 8th; Danke (Lalala Studio); Enzo; Fridolin Walcher; Johnny Hockings; Ryan Bickley	Freedo	3:04
11.	"Outro: Day 2"	Wonderkid; Hybe	Wonderkid	1:52
Total length:				30:02

== Accolades ==
Awards and nominations for Border: Dilemma
Ceremony	Year	Award	Result	Ref.
Gaon Chart Music Awards	2021	Album of the Year – 4th Quarter	Nominated	
Hanteo Music Awards	2021	Initial Chodong Record Award	Won	
Mnet Asian Music Awards	2021	TikTok Album of the Year	Longlisted	
Golden Disc Awards	2022	Album Bonsang	Won	

Music program awards
Song	Program	Date	Ref.
"Tamed-Dashed"	The Show	October 19, 2021	
"Tamed-Dashed"	Show Champion	October 20, 2021	
"Tamed-Dashed"	Music Bank	October 22, 2021	
"Blessed-Cursed"	Show Champion	January 19, 2022	
"Blessed-Cursed"	Music Bank	January 21, 2022	

== Charts ==
=== Weekly charts ===
Weekly chart performance for Dimension: Dilemma
Chart (2021–2022)	Peak position
Austrian Albums (Ö3 Austria)	8
Belgian Albums (Ultratop Flanders)	13
Belgian Albums (Ultratop Wallonia)	31
Canadian Albums (Billboard)	50
Croatian International Albums (HDU)	4
Danish Albums (Hitlisten)	7
Dutch Albums (Album Top 100)	44
Finnish Albums (Suomen virallinen lista)	12
German Albums (Offizielle Top 100)	8
Hungarian Albums (MAHASZ)	7
Italian Albums (FIMI)	64
Japanese Albums (Oricon)	1
Japan Hot Albums (Billboard Japan)	1
Lithuanian Albums (AGATA)	78
Polish Albums (ZPAV)	39
Scottish Albums (Official Charts)	14
South Korean Albums (Gaon)	1
Spanish Albums (PROMUSICAE)	23
Swedish Physical Albums (Sverigetopplistan)	13
Swiss Albums (Schweizer Hitparade)	33
UK Albums (Official Charts)	81
UK Independent Albums (Official Charts)	6
US Billboard 200	11
US World Albums (Billboard)	1

Weekly chart performance for Dimension: Answer
Chart (2022)	Peak position
Austrian Albums (Ö3 Austria)	18
Belgian Albums (Ultratop Flanders)	15
Belgian Albums (Ultratop Wallonia)	5
Croatian International Albums (HDU)	18
Dutch Albums (Album Top 100)	83
Finnish Albums (Suomen virallinen lista)	8
French Albums (SNEP)	17
German Albums (Offizielle Top 100)	14
Hungarian Albums (MAHASZ)	6
Japan Hot Albums (Billboard Japan)	1
Japanese Albums (Oricon)	1
South Korean Albums (Gaon)	1
Swedish Physical Albums (Sverigetopplistan)	12
Swiss Albums (Schweizer Hitparade)	21
US Billboard 200	13

=== Monthly charts ===
Monthly chart performance for Dimension: Dilemma
Chart (2021)	Peak position
Japanese Albums (Oricon)	4
South Korean Albums (Gaon)	2

Monthly chart performance for Dimension: Answer
Chart (2022)	Peak position
Japanese Albums (Oricon)	3
South Korean Albums (Gaon)	1

=== Year-end charts ===
Year-end chart performance for Dimension: Dilemma
Chart (2021)	Position
Hungarian Albums (MAHASZ)	93
Japanese Albums (Oricon)	17
Japanese Hot Albums (Billboard Japan)	28
South Korean Albums (Gaon)	9

Year-end chart performance for Dimension: Answer
Chart (2022)	Position
French Albums (SNEP)	195
Japanese Albums (Oricon)	32
Japanese Hot Albums (Billboard Japan)	40
South Korean Albums (Circle)	25

== Certifications and sales ==
Certifications for Dimension: Dilemma
Region	Certification	Certified units/sales
Japan (RIAJ)	Gold	100,000^{^}
South Korea (KMCA)	Million	1,299,474
^{^} Shipments figures based on certification alone.

Certifications for Dimension: Answer
Region	Certification	Certified units/sales
Japan (RIAJ)	Gold	100,000^{^}
South Korea (KMCA)	3× Platinum	750,000^{^}
^{^} Shipments figures based on certification alone.

== Release history ==
Release formats for Dimension: Dilemma
Region	Date	Format	Label
Various	October 12, 2021	CD; digital download; streaming	Belift Lab; Genie Music; Stone Music Entertainment
