= Cinemax =

American movie-focused pay television network

- Current logo, which is a revision of 2011 logo, used since 2016.
- Type: Pay television network
- Country: United States
- Broadcast area: Nationwide
- Headquarters: 30 Hudson Yards, New York City

Programming
- Languages: English; Spanish (Cinemáx; also as SAP option on all other channels)
- Picture format: 1080i (HDTV)
- Timeshift service: Cinemax timeshift channels (Note: Cinemax Hits, Cinemax Action, Cinemax Classics and Cinemáx each operate exclusively on an Eastern Time schedule.): Cinemax (East / West); Cinemax Hits (East / West); Cinemax Action (East / West)

Ownership
- Parent: Home Box Office, Inc.
- Key people: Casey Bloys (President/Head of Programming, HBO/Cinemax)
- Sister channels: list of assets owned by Skydance

History
- Launched: August 1, 1980; 46 years ago
- Former names: Max (2008–2011)

Links
- Website: cinemax.com

Availability

Streaming media
- HBO Max: hbomax.com; (subscription required to access content)
- Apple TV Channels (Note: A subscription or trial is required to access content on Cinemax's Apple TV, Amazon Video and Roku channels.): Over-the-top TV Available feeds: Cinemax (East); Cinemax (West)
- Amazon Video Channels: Over-the-top TV Available feeds: Cinemax (East/West); Cinemax Hits (East); Cinemax Action (East); Cinemax Classics (East); Cinemáx (East)
- The Roku Channel: Over-the-top TV Available feeds: Cinemax (East); Cinemax (West)

Cinemax is an American premium television network and service owned by Home Box Office, Inc., a subsidiary of Skydance Corporation. Launched on August 1, 1980, as a "maxi-pay" service to complement the offerings of its sister premium network, HBO (Home Box Office), Cinemax initially focused on recent and classic films. Today, its programming primarily includes recent and classic theatrically released films, original series, documentaries, and special behind-the-scenes features.

It operates five 24-hour linear channels and offers a traditional subscription video-on-demand service called Cinemax On Demand. Cinemax previously provided a TV Everywhere streaming platform, Cinemax Go, which is no longer available. However, its linear channels are accessible through multichannel video programming distributors such as Apple TV, Amazon Video, and Roku.

== History ==
Home Box Office, Inc., owned by Time Inc.'s Time-Life Broadcasting unit, launched a movie-centered pay service called Take 2 on April 1, 1979, as a companion to HBO. However, Take 2 struggled with subscriber growth and was discontinued in February 1981. HBO then announced the launch of Cinemax, a "maxi-pay" network designed to complement HBO and compete with other movie network/premium services. Cinemax debuted on August 1, 1980, focusing on theatrical films with no commercials or edits for content.

Cinemax initially aired on 56 cable systems in the Eastern and Central time zones, with a West Coast feed launching on September 1, 1980. The network transitioned to a 24-hour schedule on January 1, 1981. Cinemax offered uncut films and was marketed as a premium addition to HBO, often bundled with HBO for a discount.

In October 1983, Cinemax faced a trademark infringement lawsuit from Tulsa 23 Limited Partnership over its promotional slogan, "We Are Your Movie Star." The court ruled in favor of Tulsa 23, and Cinemax was ordered to discontinue the slogan.

As competition increased, Cinemax adjusted its programming strategy by including more adult-oriented films and launching the Friday After Dark late-night block in 1984. The network also introduced original programming and series, including Second City Television, The Richard Belzer Show and The Max Headroom Show, as well as the freeform Cinemax Comedy Experiment. Music programming was also introduced, including Album Flash and Cinemax Sessions; some of these music programs were simulcast for free over a national FM radio network to provide stereo audio. In February 1988, the network premiere of Lethal Weapon became one of Cinemax's highest-rated broadcasts.

On March 4, 1989, Warner Communications announced its intent to merge with HBO's parent company, Time Inc., for $14.9 billion. Despite legal challenges from Paramount Communications, the merger was completed on January 10, 1990, creating Time Warner (later WarnerMedia, now Warner Bros. Discovery), which remains the parent company of Cinemax and HBO.

In August 1991, Cinemax, along with HBO, was among the first American pay TV services to introduce multiplexed channels. Starting in 1992, Cinemax reintroduced television series development with adult-oriented scripted series, such as Erotic Confessions, Hot Line, Passion Cove, Lingerie, and Co-Ed Confidential.

Cinemax was the exclusive premiere network of several blockbuster movies, such as GoodFellas and The Godfather Part III in 1991, Juice in 1993, The Fugitive in 1994, Any Given Sunday, Eyes Wide Shut, and The Matrix in 2000, and X-Men in 2002. From 1992 to 1997, Cinemax featured daily movie showcases centered on specific genres, identified by pictograms. This practice ended in September 1997, with Cinemax adopting a simplified branding strategy that included "Max Hits at 8" and "Max Prime at 10."

In February 1994, Cinemax, HBO, Showtime, and The Movie Channel introduced a content advisory system to inform viewers about program content. A revised system with content codes was implemented on June 10, 1994.

In 1998, Cinemax began offering "sneak preview" blocks for its multiplex channels, ActionMax and ThrillerMax. Classic films, once a staple of the Cinemax schedule, were increasingly featured on multiplex channels like 5StarMax.

In February 2011, Cinemax shifted its focus to original programming, launching series to compete with other premium services, all of which were very popular: Banshee, The Knick, Hunted, Strike Back. and to rebrand its image from being primarily known for softcore pornographic content. Cinemax shortened its name to just Max in 2008, but it was reverted 3 years later.

Following AT&T's acquisition of Time Warner in 2018, Cinemax's focus shifted significantly. Adult programming on Cinemax and HBO's multiplexes, as well as on-demand services, nearly disappeared due to increased availability of such content online and competition from other providers.

In January 2020, WarnerMedia announced that with the upcoming launch of HBO Max, Cinemax would cease commissioning original programming but would continue as a movie-focused service through existing distributors. Cinemax's original programming, although available internationally, was not included in HBO Max. Len Amato, the executive overseeing Cinemax and HBO's film and miniseries division, left WarnerMedia on August 14, 2020, marking the end of Cinemax's original programming efforts.

On May 17, 2021, AT&T and Discovery, Inc. announced a Reverse Morris Trust agreement, wherein WarnerMedia would spin-off from AT&T and merge with Discovery for $43 billion. This merger, completed in spring 2022, resulted in the formation of Warner Bros. Discovery, led by David Zaslav. On May 23, 2023, the merged company's streaming service was rebranded as Max. It would soon revert back to HBO Max on July 9, 2025.

== Channels ==
On May 8, 1991, Home Box Office Inc. announced plans to launch multiplexed companion channels for HBO and Cinemax, offering additional programming options at no extra charge. The test launch on August 1, 1991, introduced Cinemax 2, HBO2, and HBO3 (now HBO Signature) to select TeleCable customers, providing distinct programming from their parent channels. John K. Billock, HBO's EVP of marketing, cited subscriber dissatisfaction with program scheduling as a reason for the multiplex expansion. A November 1991 ACNielsen survey showed positive impacts from the multiplex channels, including reduced negative opinions on pricing and improved overall usage.

In February 1996, Home Box Office announced plans to expand to twelve channels, including two additional Cinemax channels and a fourth HBO channel, projected for a spring 1997 launch. The Cinemax multiplex expanded on December 1, 1996, with the launch of Cinemax 3, and the introduction of Mountain Time Zone feeds.

The Cinemax multiplex was marketed as "MultiChannel Cinemax" in September 1994, rebranded to "MultiMax" in April 1998, and later applied to the expanded four-channel package. This included MoreMax (formerly Cinemax 2), ActionMax (formerly Cinemax 3), and the new ThrillerMax channel.

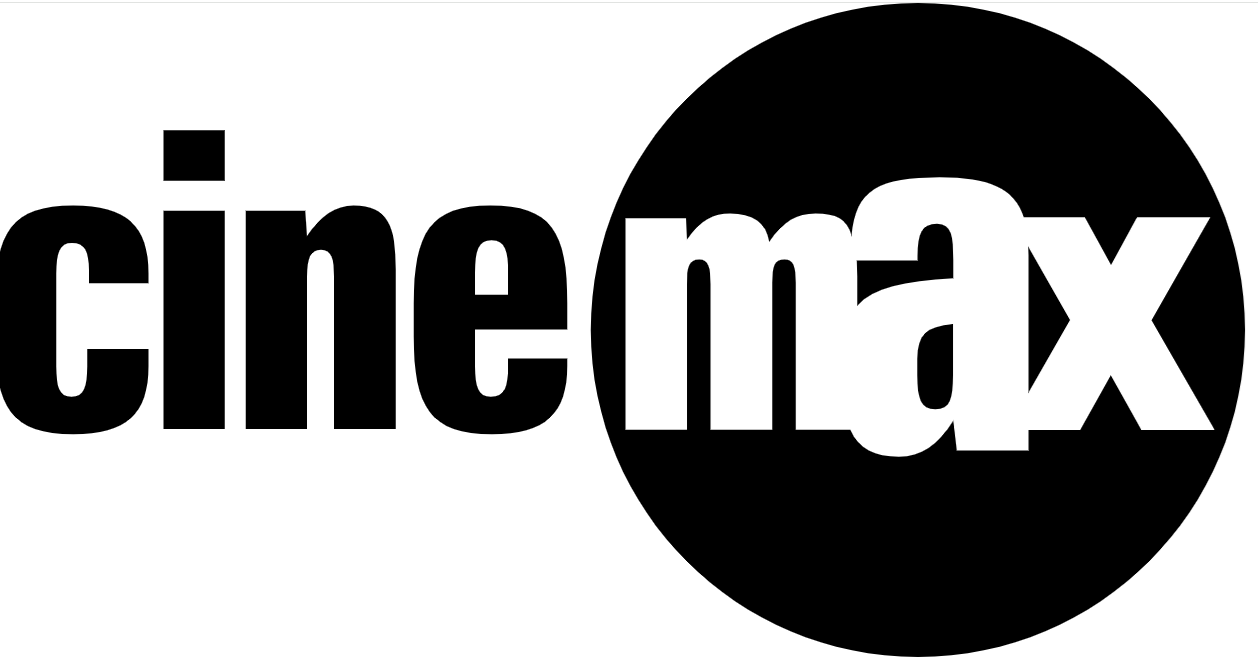
Cinemax logo used from 1997 to 2011. "Cine" was removed from the logo in 2008.

On May 17, 2001, four additional themed channels were launched: OuterMax, WMax (later MovieMax), @Max (later Max Latino), and 5StarMax. Max Latino was rebranded as Cinemáx on April 1, 2015, mirroring the flagship Cinemax schedule with Spanish-language dubs. MovieMax started as a family-oriented channel and later focused on recent and classic movies.

=== List of channels ===
Cinemax offers up to five 24-hour multiplex channels, available in both standard and high definition, with regional feeds based on time zones. These channels include a subscription video-on-demand service, Cinemax on Demand. Maintenance periods, ranging from 30 minutes to two hours, occur monthly during early morning hours before the 6:00 a.m. ET/PT start of the broadcast day.

Cinemax, MoreMax and ActionMax transmit both Eastern and Pacific Time Zone schedules. The time zone-based feeds are usually packaged together, resulting in a maximum three-hour difference in local airtimes between geographic locations. The opposite-region feed serves as a timeshift channel, allowing viewers to watch programs up to three hours later or four hours earlier than their local airtime. While most providers offer only the East and West Coast feeds of the main Cinemax channel, timeshifted feeds for other multiplex channels are available on platforms like DirecTV, YouTube TV, and Hulu + Live TV.

==== Current channels ====
Channel	Description and programming
Cinemax	The main flagship feed; Cinemax features blockbuster movies, foreign, independent and arthouse films, first-run films, movie favorites and original programming. Cinemax commonly exclusively premieres new movies (debuting on the network within a lag of between eight months to one year on average from their initial theatrical release) on Saturday nights at 10:00 p.m. Eastern Time as part of "See It Saturday" and broadcasts a featured movie Sunday through Thursdays at 10:00 p.m. Eastern Time. Cinemax also runs original series on Friday evenings at 10:00 p.m. Eastern Time. Friday–Sunday are usually the days for exclusive and non-exclusive premieres or major blockbusters, as well as Saturday for programming events, and Sundays for series.
Cinemax Hits	Launched in 1991, Cinemax Hits (formerly Cinemax 2 and MoreMax) is a channel with similar program content as Cinemax on a separate schedule. The service broadcasts a featured movie every night at 9:00 p.m. Eastern Time. MoreMax was originally named "Cinemax 2" until 1998. It originally used slightly different bumpers to distinguish itself from the original Cinemax, but by 1993, it had instead begun using a barebones "program grid" structure similar to the Prevue Channel (also used by Cinemax 3, as well as by sister networks HBO2 and HBO3). With the rebrand to MoreMax, it gained a full on-air look once more. This channel serves as a repeat of all the programs, so that people who missed premieres can get a second chance to watch it on here, 24 hours later. MoreMax rebranded as Cinemax Hits on September 4, 2025.
Cinemax Action	Launched in 1998, Cinemax Action (formerly Cinemax 3 and ActionMax) broadcasts action movies including blockbusters, westerns, war pictures, martial arts, horror and adventure films; the channel has a prime time film block, "Heroes at 8", which carries a featured action movie at 8:00 p.m. Eastern Time nightly. ActionMax replaced "Cinemax 3", which existed from 1995 to 1997. ActionMax rebranded as Cinemax Action on September 4, 2025.
Cinemax Classics	Launched on May 17, 2001, Cinemax Classics (formerly 5StarMax) showcases modern classics, featuring award-winning films and timeless movie classics. The channel broadcasts a featured classic every night at 9:00 p.m. Eastern Time. It is the only Cinemax channel that did not air Max After Dark content. 5StarMax rebranded as Cinemax Classics on September 4, 2025.
Cinemáx (Note: Alternately "Cinemax Spanish" or "Cinemax en Espanol" in program listings.)	Cinemáx is a Spanish simulcast of Cinemax (similar to HBO Latino, although without any programming differences), broadcasting Spanish-dubbed Hollywood films and original series; all of Cinemax's other multiplex channels otherwise do carry Spanish film audio on the second audio program. The channel originally launched on May 17, 2001, as @Max, targeted at young adults between the ages of 18 and 34 with programming focused on contemporary films, and movies with an exemplified attitude and unique ideas; under its current format, the channel was known as MaxLatino from June 1, 2013, to April 1, 2015, when it adopted its parent network's branding (with the "a" utilizing an acute diacritic accent for pronunciation disambiguity).

==== Former channels ====
Channel	Description and programming
ThrillerMax	Launched in 1998, ThrillerMax ran mystery, suspense, horror and thriller movies; the channel ran a prime-time film block, "When the Clock Strikes 10", showing a different featured mystery, suspense or thriller at 10:00 p.m. Eastern Time seven nights a week. Warner Bros. Discovery confirmed on June 13, 2025 that ThrillerMax, MovieMax and OuterMax along with HBO Family would close on August 15, 2025, with viewers directed to HBO Max.
MovieMax	MovieMax broadcast films aimed at young adults between the ages of 18 and 34 years old (the format of the pre-relaunch @Max); it was previously formatted as a family-oriented service from June 2013 to January 2015. The channel originally launched on May 17, 2001, as WMax, which was targeted at a female audience, and featured dramas, mysteries and classic romance films.
OuterMax	Launched on May 17, 2001, OuterMax ran science fiction, horror and fantasy films; the channel had a late-night film block, "Graveyard Shift", carrying a featured sci-fi or horror movie every night at midnight Eastern Time.

=== Other services ===
==== Cinemax HD ====
Cinemax HD broadcasts in 1080i resolution with Dolby Digital 5.1 sound. Cinemax provides high definition simulcast feeds for its main channel and all four multiplex channels. Initially, from the 2008 expansion of HD simulcasts for the multiplex feeds, most pay television providers only offered the main Cinemax channel in HD, with HD availability for multiplex channels varying by market. As of 2025, most providers offer all five Cinemax multiplex channels in HD, either on a dedicated HD channel tier or as hybrid SD/HD feeds. The flagship network switched to exclusive high definition programming on September 1, 2008.

==== Cinemax on Demand ====
Cinemax on Demand is the network's companion subscription video-on-demand (SVOD) service, available at no extra charge to subscribers of the linear television service. Launched in 2002, it offers VOD content through select virtual MVPD services such as DirecTV Stream and Hulu, as well as on Cinemax's dedicated OTT video channels via Apple TV Channels, Amazon Video Channels, and The Roku Channel.

==== Cinemax Go ====

Cinemax Go (formerly MAX Go) was a TV Everywhere streaming service for Cinemax subscribers, available as a desktop website and through apps for Apple and Google Play devices, as well as most digital media players and game consoles. Launched on September 13, 2010, it mirrored the content of Cinemax On Demand, excluding live simulcasts of the linear channels. New episodes of the network's original programming were available at the same time as their wireline release.

The service was available to subscribers of AT&T U-verse, Cox Communications, DirecTV, Dish Network, Suddenlink Communications, and Charter Communications. The MAX Go app was discontinued on April 30, 2020, and the desktop website, renamed Cinemax Go, continued until July 31, 2022. The service was discontinued as Warner Bros. Discovery consolidated its streaming efforts under HBO Max, rebranded as Max on May 23, 2023, before reverting to HBO Max on July 9, 2025.

== Programming ==
Cinemax schedules movies for 20–24 hours daily on its main channel and 24 hours on its multiplex channels. Since June 2000, new theatrical and original movies have premiered every Sunday at 8:00 p.m. ET/PT. First-run films typically debut 10 months to a year after their theatrical release and within six months of DVD or VOD release.

=== Original programming ===
On August 12, 2011, Cinemax expanded into original programming with the American premiere of the British action series Strike Back. The series, which had originally aired in the UK, was produced in partnership with HBO. Cinemax's second original series, Hunted, premiered on October 19, 2012, in collaboration with BBC One. This was followed by Banshee in 2013, and in 2014, Sandbox and The Knick.

In 2020, Cinemax announced it would stop commissioning original programming to focus on HBO Max. The martial arts drama Warrior was the last original series on Cinemax, with its third season moving to HBO Max in April 2021.

==== Max After Dark ====
Cinemax's late-night block, Max After Dark, featured softcore pornographic films and original series with TV-MA or R ratings, primarily for strong sexual content and nudity. This block, which began on May 4, 1984, as "Cinemax Friday After Dark", expanded to seven nights a week by the late 1990s. Programs included Lingerie, Life on Top, Femme Fatales, and Topless Prophet. The block was known for its lenient scheduling around mainstream films and series and was often humorously referred to as "Skinemax".

The adult content was not limited to the main Cinemax channel but also aired on multiplex channels like MoreMax, ActionMax, ThrillerMax, and OuterMax. However, channels like MovieMax and 5StarMax avoided adult programming. The block's presence, alongside other HBO channels, was partly due to the FCC's content regulations not applying to cable networks.

By 2013, Cinemax began reducing Max After Dark content to focus more on original programming, as the prevalence of Internet pornography made the block's content seem relatively tame compared to HBO's original series.

== International distribution ==
=== Latin America ===
A Latin American version of Cinemax was launched on September 5, 1993, airing movies old and new, as well as television series and miniseries. Starting June 1, 2010, it became an ad-supported basic cable channel in the region. Original series would air on HBO's premium suite in Latin America.

=== Asia ===
Cinemax began broadcasting in 1996, featuring action, comedy, science fiction, and western movies. The channel was known as Max from 2009 to 2012.

=== Central Europe ===
Launched in February 2005, Cinemax focused on festival, indie, European, and classic films. Cinemax and Cinemax 2 are available in Bulgaria, the Czech Republic, Hungary, Poland, Romania, and Slovakia, and expanded to certain Balkan Peninsula countries in 2009. Initially a timeshift channel, Cinemax 2 started airing a distinct schedule from 2016.
