= Orange Blood =

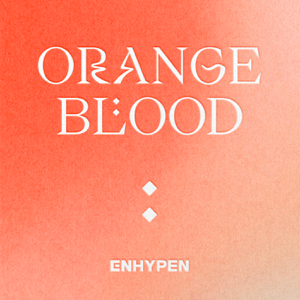
- Digital cover

EP by Enhypen
- Released: November 17, 2023
- Genres: K-pop; R&B; funk
- Length: 20:38
- Labels: Belift Lab; Genie Music; Stone Music
- Producers: Wonderkid; BreadBeat; Ca$hcow; Slow Rabbit; Connor McDonough; Pdogg; Ghstloop; Gen Neo; Space Primates

Enhypen chronology
Dark Blood (2023)	Orange Blood (2023)	Memorabilia (2024)

Singles from Orange Blood
- 1. "Sweet Venom" Released: November 17, 2023

Orange Blood is the fifth extended play (EP) by South Korean boy band Enhypen. It was released on November 17, 2023, through Belift Lab, alongside its title track, "Sweet Venom".

== Background and promotion ==
On October 15, 2023, Enhypen's label, Belift Lab, announced the album through a notice to fans on Weverse. According to a timeline shared on their social media accounts, the album is slated for release on November 17, with promotions starting on October 27. On October 16, the group unveiled a 25-second logo trailer. The video included visuals of solar eclipses and a sunset that turns orange, followed by the phrase "you and I are connected through blood." Orange Blood was teased as the continuation of a blood-themed story that started with the group's EP Dark Blood, which was released on May 22, and aims to convey various "entertaining contents" through a new "K-pop roadmap".

== Commercial performance ==
On South Korea's Hanteo Chart, Orange Blood sold more than 1.38 million copies on its first day, surpassing the sales of their previous EP.

According to the International Federation of the Phonographic Industry (IFPI)'s Global Music Report for 2023, Orange Blood was the nineteenth best-selling album worldwide, having sold 1.7 million units. (Note: The IFPI Global Albums chart ranks, in order, the albums that generated the most money globally across streaming, download, and physical record sales (combined) in a calendar year. The Global Album Sales Chart measures global unit sales across all physical formats, as well as full album downloads.)

== Track listing ==
Orange Blood track listing
No.	Title	Writer(s)	Producer(s)	Length
1.	"Mortal"	BreadBeat; Ca$hcow; Hybe; Wonderkid; Tim Tan	Wonderkid; BreadBeat; Ca$hcow	3:47
2.	"Sweet Venom"	Slow Rabbit; Riley McDonough; Connor McDonough; Madison Love; "Hitman" Bang; Wonderkid; Lee Yi-jin; Jay	Slow Rabbit; Connor McDonough	2:28
3.	"Still Monster"	Pdogg; Ghstloop; Blvsh; Chris James; "Hitman" Bang; Kim Jae-won (Jam Factory); Bang Hye-hyun (Jam Factory); Jo Mi-yang	Pdogg; Ghstloop	3:06
4.	"Blind" (멀어; lit. 'It's Far')	Davey Nate; Gen Neo; Leonalion; Kim Jae-won; "Hitman" Bang; Baek Geum-min (Jam Factory); Jung Mul-hwa (Jam Factory); Daon (MUMW)	Gen Neo	3:18
5.	"Orange Flower (You Complete Me)"	Marc Sibley; Nathan Cunningham; Ryan Curtis; Colin "Magsy" Magalong; Ryan Jhun; Lee Yi-jin; "Hitman" Bang; Stevie Aiello; Jeon Ji-eun (January 8th (Lalala Studio)); Lee Seu-ran	Space Primates	3:00
6.	"Sweet Venom" (English version)	Slow Rabbit; Riley McDonough; Connor McDonough; Madison Love; Wonderkid	Slow Rabbit; Connor McDonough	2:28
Total length:				18:10

Orange Blood– digital version
No.	Title	Writer(s)	Producer(s)	Length
7.	"Sweet Venom" (featuring Bella Poarch)	Slow Rabbit; Riley McDonough; Connor McDonough; Madison Love; Wonderkid	Slow Rabbit; Connor McDonough	2:28
Total length:				20:38

== Accolades ==
Music program awards
Song	Program	Date	Ref.
"Sweet Venom"	Music Bank	November 24, 2023	

== Charts ==
=== Weekly charts ===
Weekly chart performance
Chart (2023)	Peak position
Austrian Albums (Ö3 Austria)	15
Belgian Albums (Ultratop Flanders)	22
Belgian Albums (Ultratop Wallonia)	3
Croatian International Albums (HDU)	4
German Albums (Offizielle Top 100)	17
Hungarian Albums (MAHASZ)	16
Italian Albums (FIMI)	68
Japanese Albums (Oricon)	1
Japanese Combined Albums (Oricon)	1
Japanese Hot Albums (Billboard Japan)	1
Polish Albums (ZPAV)	96
South Korean Albums (Circle)	1
Spanish Albums (Promusicae)	62
Swedish Physical Albums (Sverigetopplistan)	8
Swiss Albums (Schweizer Hitparade)	15
UK Album Downloads (Official Charts)	26
US Billboard 200	4
US World Albums (Billboard)	1

=== Monthly charts ===
Monthly chart performance
Chart (2023)	Position
Japanese Albums (Oricon)	2
South Korean Albums (Circle)	4

=== Year-end charts ===
Year-end chart performance
Chart (2023)	Position
Japanese Albums (Oricon)	24
Japanese Hot Albums (Billboard Japan)	32
South Korean Albums (Circle)	13

Year-end chart performance
Chart (2024)	Position
South Korean Albums (Circle)	90

== Certifications and sales ==
Certifications
Region	Certification	Certified units/sales
Japan (RIAJ)	Gold	100,000^{^}
South Korea (KMCA)	2× Million	2,000,000^{^}
South Korea (KMCA) Weverse version	Platinum	250,000^{^}
Summaries
Worldwide (IFPI)	—	1,700,000
^{^} Shipments figures based on certification alone.
