= Lingerie (TV series) =

- Genre: Drama, romance, softcore erotica
- Created by: John Quinn
- Starring: Jennifer Korbin; Geoff Stevens; Michael Scratch; Lana Tailor
- Composer: Herman Beeftink
- Country of origin: United States
- Original language: English
- No. of seasons: 2
- No. of episodes: 26

Production
- Executive producer: John Quinn
- Production locations: Toronto, Ontario
- Camera setup: Film; single-camera
- Running time: 30 minutes
- Production companies: American Cinema Group; HBO Entertainment

Original release
- Network: Cinemax
- Release: July 3, 2009 – December 24, 2010

Lingerie is an erotic softcore pornographic romantic drama television series, created by John Quinn, that aired on Cinemax from July 3, 2009, to December 24, 2010.

== Synopsis ==
Most of the stories in this series revolve around Lacey Summers, who leaves behind her a successful career as a fashion model to design lingerie. She decides to live in a large loft that doubles as her design studio.

== Cast and characters ==
- Jennifer Korbin as Lacey Summers: the main character of the series. A smart, beautiful, yet sassy and vulnerable former fashion model and a designer of her line of lingerie. Most of the series revolves around her love affairs.
- Matthew Fitzgerald/Marcus Colby as Cody Summers: Lacey's younger yet protective brother. He works as the apartment's "handyman", he later starts to do modeling. He is a jocular and light-hearted womanizer who succeeds in seducing women.
- Michael Scratch as Jason: a handsome and charming fashion photographer who's Lacey's friend and also her on-again-off-again boyfriend.
- Lana Tailor as Vanessa: a bisexual aspiring actress from Seattle, who becomes Lacey's roommate. She had a brief relationship with Jason, which annoyed Lacey.
- Denise Cobar as Marilyn: Lacey's best friend, who writes for a gossip fashion magazine.
- Geoff Stevens as Jeffery: Lacey's friend, a gay fashion designer. He is very witty and sarcastic.
- Erin Brown as Stephanie: Lacey's assistant. She has an on and off relationship with Cody, though she is annoyed by his absent-mindedness.
- Emily McLeod as Joanne: Lacey's new assistant in the second season. She is a bartender at Duncan's.
- Jonathan Steen as Russ: Cody's roommate and best friend. He is a bartender at Duncan's and serves as Cody's supportive friend. He is both smart and charismatic, and the more serious of the two.
- Chris Smits as Rick: a New York City firefighter who became Lacey's short-lived love interest.
- Amber Smith as Giovanna: an established designer who uses sabotage and deceit to keep Lacey from realizing her dream.

== Episodes ==
=== Season 1 (2009) ===
No. overall	No. in season	Title	Directed by	Written by	Original air date
1	1	"Picture Perfect"	Trevor Cornish	John Quinn	July 3, 2009
2	2	"Designer Love"	Trevor Cornish	Anthony L. Greene	July 10, 2009
3	3	"Double or Nothing"	Trevor Cornish	John Quinn	July 17, 2009
4	4	"Russ Gets His Girl"	Trevor Cornish	Sandy Travis	July 24, 2009
5	5	"Temptation"	Christopher Warre Smets	Sandy Travis	July 31, 2009
6	6	"By Design"	Christopher Warre Smets	John Quinn	August 7, 2009
7	7	"Comfort Fit"	Christopher Warre Smets	Pat Jacobs	August 14, 2009
8	8	"Everyone's a Critic"	Christopher Warre Smets	Anthony L. Greene	August 21, 2009
9	9	"Model Behavior"	Christopher Warre Smets	Pat Jacobs	August 28, 2009
10	10	"Double Double"	Unknown	Unknown	September 4, 2009
11	11	"Model Girlfriends"	Unknown	Unknown	September 11, 2009
12	12	"Runway Ready"	Unknown	Unknown	September 18, 2009
13	13	"Rags to Riches"	Unknown	Unknown	September 25, 2009

=== Season 2 (2010) ===
No. overall	No. in season	Title	Directed by	Written by	Original air date
14	1	"Careful What You Wish For"	Unknown	Unknown	October 2, 2010
15	2	"Looks Are Deceiving"	Unknown	Unknown	October 9, 2010
16	3	"Everybody Loves Cody"	Unknown	Unknown	October 16, 2010
17	4	"Worse for the Wear"	Christopher Warre Smets	Doug Miller	October 23, 2010
18	5	"Three is Never a Crowd"	Unknown	Unknown	October 30, 2010
19	6	"The Morning After"	Unknown	Unknown	November 6, 2010
20	7	"She's Got Legs"	Unknown	Unknown	November 12, 2010
21	8	"Nothing's Ever Easy"	Unknown	Unknown	November 19, 2010
22	9	"Screwed"	Unknown	Unknown	November 26, 2010
23	10	"Naughty Couture"	Unknown	Unknown	December 3, 2010
24	11	"Exotic Dancer"	Unknown	Unknown	December 10, 2010
25	12	"Exposed"	Unknown	Unknown	December 17, 2010
26	13	"Walk the Talk"	Unknown	Unknown	December 24, 2010
