= Continue? =

- Digital cover

EP by Lun8
- Released: June 15, 2023
- Length: 15:23
- Label: Fantagio; Kakao Entertainment

Singles from Continue?
- 1. "Voyager" Released: June 15, 2023; 2. "Wild Heart" Released: June 15, 2023

Continue? is the debut extended play by South Korean boy band Lun8. It was released on June 15, 2023, by Fantagio and distributed by Kakao Entertainment. The EP consists of five songs, including the title tracks "Voyager" and "Wild Heart".

== Background and release ==
On June 12, 2023, a highlight medley of the album was released. On June 13, a video teaser was released, showing the group as they get ready for a drag race.

The EP was released through several music portals, including Melon in South Korea, and Spotify globally.

== Promotion ==
=== Singles ===
"Voyager" and "Wild Heart" were released as double title tracks in conjunction with the EP on June 15. On June 13, the first music video teaser for "Wild Heart" was released. On June 14, the second and final music video teaser was released. The full music video was released on June 15 through the company's official YouTube channel.

On June 19, the music video teaser for the second title track, "Voyager", was released. On June 21, the full music video for "Voyager" was released.

A special film was released for the EP track "Live in the Moment" on July 26.

== Track listing ==
Continue? track listing
No.	Title	Lyrics	Music	Arrangement	Length
1.	"Voyager"	PCDC	PCDC	PCDC	3:01
2.	"Wild Heart"	Enzo (Insiders); Kim Jae-won (Jam Factory); Yoo Byul (Jam Factory)	Sebastian Thott; Alex Karlsson (JeL); Didrik Thott	Sebastian Thott	2:59
3.	"XX"	Enzo (Insiders); Christian Fast; Didrik Thott; Secret Weapon (Insiders); Dr. Ahn (Insiders)	Secret Weapon (Insiders); Dr. Ahn (Insiders); Christian Fast; Didrik Thott; Enzo (Insiders); Han Sang-joo	Secret Weapon (Insiders); Dr. Ahn (Insiders); Christian Fast; Didrik Thott; Enzo (Insiders); Han Sang-joo	2:49
4.	"We Like It"	Kim Jae-won (Jam Factory); Yoo Hye-joo (Lalala Studio); Yoo Da-eun (Jam Factory)	Samuli Laiho; Jonnaemilia; Ronny Svendsen; Anne Judith Wik; Nermin Harambašić; Robin Jenssen	Ronny Svendsen	3:29
5.	"Live in the Moment"	Enzo (Insiders)	Tiyon "TC" Mack; T.Y.; Gibum	T.Y.; Gibum	3:03
Total length:					15:23

== Charts ==
Chart performance for Continue?
Chart (2023)	Peak position
Japanese Albums (Oricon)	17
Japanese Hot Albums (Billboard Japan)	45
South Korean Albums (Circle)	5
