= Lun8 =

South Korean boy group

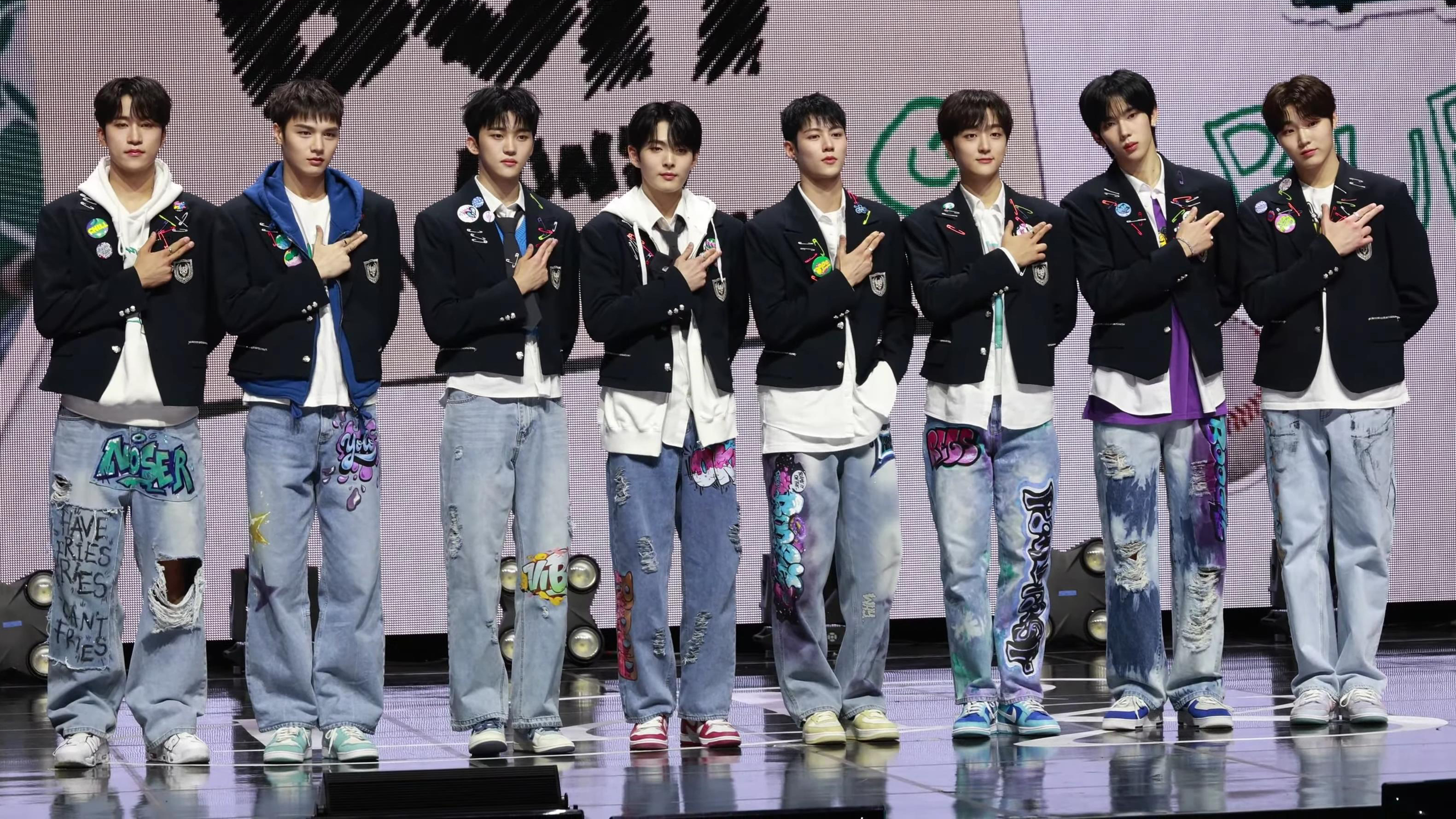
- Lun8 in March 2024; L-R: Junwoo, Ji Eun-ho, Dohyun, Takuma, Ian, Jinsu, Chael, Eunseop

Background information
- Origin: Seoul, South Korea
- Genres: K-pop; Dance-rock; pop rap
- Years active: 2023–present
- Labels: Fantagio; Hian
- Spinoffs: Lun8wave
- Members: Yuma; Chael; Jinsu; Takuma; Junwoo; Dohyun; Ian
- Past members: Ji Eun-ho; Eunseop
- Website: www.fantagio.kr/musicians/루네이트/

Lun8 (Korean: 루네이트; RR: Runeiteu; stylized in all caps) is a South Korean boy band formed by Fantagio in 2023. The group consists of seven members: Yuma, Chael, Jinsu, Takuma, Junwoo, Dohyun, and Ian. Former members Eunseop and Ji Eun-ho left the group in January 2025 and March 2026, respectively. Yuma was added to the group in February 2025. They debuted on June 15, 2023, with the extended play (EP) Continue?.

== Name ==
Lun8 means "eight boys embracing the moonlight that brightens the dark night".

== History ==
=== Pre-debut ===
Ian was known as a contestant on Mnet's survival show I-Land in 2020, however he was eliminated in the first part.

The members were known started out as trainees under Fantagio i-Teen, a rookie talent development program under Fantagio.

=== 2023–2024: Introduction, debut and subsequent releases ===
On March 22, 2023, Fantagio announced through a press release would debut a new boy group in the first half of that year, its first boy group since Astro in 2016 and its first overall idol group since Weki Meki in 2017. On April 1, Fantagio released the group's logo motion and the group's name as Lun8, as well as opening their social media accounts. The eight members of the group were revealed individually starting on April 4 (in order: Ian, Junwoo, Takuma, Jinsu, Eunseop, Chael, Ji Eun-ho and Dohyun).

Lun8 signed with Japanese agency HIAN on June 13, 2023, ahead of their official debut. On June 15, 2023, Lun8 released their debut EP, Continue?, alongside its lead singles "Voyager" and "Wild Heart". The debut showcase was held on the same day. In November 2023, Lun8's first sub-unit, Lun8wave was formed with members Takuma, Junwoo, Dohyun, Ji Eun-ho and Eunseop. The unit released the single "Playground" on November 22. In February 2024, Fantagio announced that Lun8 would released their second extended play, Buff on March 13. In May 2024, Lun8 was set to make their Japanese debut on June 19, with the single "Evergreen". In July 2024, Fantagio announced that Lun8 would be releasing their third EP titled Awakening on August 14. In November 2024, Lun8 announced that they would be releasing their second Japanese single "Together Forever" on December 18.

=== 2025–present: Line-up changes, albums and European tour ===
In early 2025, Fantagio announced that members Dohyun and Ji Eun-ho would temporarily halt all group activities to prioritize their health while Eunseop ended his activities with the group and announced that Lun8 would be releasing their first single album Butterfly on February 19. Furthermore, Yuma joined the group beginning with their European tour in April. On June 19, Hian announced Lun8's first Japanese studio album, Elevation, set to be released on August 27. Prior to the abum's release, its lead single "Motly Crew" and two new tracks: "We Just" and "Riding High" would be release on August 13 and 20, respectively. In September 2026, Fantagio confirmed that Lun8's second single album, Lost, would be release on September 17, along with the group first fanmeeting, 2025 1st Fanmeeting 'Lun8 Company: Project #1’.

In March 2026, Fantagio announced that member Ji Eun-ho would be departing from the group to focus on his health recovery.

== Members ==
=== Current ===
- Yuma (유우마)
- Chael (카엘)
- Jinsu (진수) – leader
- Takuma (타쿠마)
- Junwoo (준우)
- Dohyun (도현)
- Ian (이안)

=== Former ===
- Ji Eun-ho (지은호)
- Eunseop (은섭)

== Discography ==
=== Studio albums ===
List of studio albums, showing selected details, selected chart positions, and sales figures
| Title | Details | Peak chart positions | Sales |
| Title | Details | JPN | Sales |
|---|---|---|---|
| Elevation | Released: August 27, 2025; Label: HIAN; Formats: CD, digital download, streaming; Track listing: 1. "Wild Heart" (Japanese version); 2. "We Just"; 3. "Together Forever"; 4. "Motley Crew"; 5. "Evergreen"; 6. "Whip" (Japanese version); 7. "Fear and Greed"; 8. "Riding High"; 9. "My Tune"; 10. "Louder"; 11. "We're Not Alone" | 20 | JPN: 3,392 |

=== Extended plays ===
List of extended plays, showing selected details, selected chart positions, and sales figures
| Title | Details | Peak chart positions | | Sales |
| Title | Details | KOR | JPN | Sales |
|---|---|---|---|---|
| Continue? | Released: June 15, 2023; Label: Fantagio; Formats: CD, digital download, streaming | 5 | 17 | KOR: 80,239; JPN: 5,248 |
| Buff | Released: March 13, 2024; Label: Fantagio; Formats: CD, digital download, streaming; Track listing: 1. "Mon2Sun (Mon♡Sun)"; 2. "Super Power"; 3. "Got the Rizz"; 4. "Pastel"; 5. "Now" (지금 만나); 6. "Super Power" (English ver.) | 4 | — | KOR: 102,750 |
| Awakening | Released: August 14, 2024; Label: Fantagio; Formats: CD, digital download, streaming; Track listing: 1. "Ride"; 2. "Whip"; 3. "Delulu"; 4. "Love Trailer"; 5. "Life Is a Movie" | 4 | — | KOR: 116,281 |
| Off the Grid | Released: July 22, 2026; Label: Fantagio; Formats: CD, digital download, streaming; Track listing: 1. "Sneakers"; 2. "To the Moon"; 3. "Back"; 4. "If I Could" | 3 | — | KOR: 90,592 |
"—" denotes a recording that did not chart or was not released in that territory

=== Single albums ===
List of single albums, showing selected details, selected chart positions, and sales figures
| Title | Details | Peak chart positions | Sales |
| Title | Details | KOR | Sales |
|---|---|---|---|
| Butterfly | Released: February 19, 2025; Label: Fantagio; Formats: CD, digital download, streaming | 3 | KOR: 68,770 |
| Lost | Released: September 18, 2025; Label: Fantagio; Formats: Digital download, streaming | 3 | KOR: 88,485 |

=== Singles ===
==== Korean singles ====
List of singles, showing year released, selected chart positions and name of the album
| Title | Year | Peak chart positions | Album |
| Title | Year | KOR Down. | Album |
|---|---|---|---|
| "Wild Heart" | 2023 | 110 | Continue? |
| "Voyager" | 2023 | 116 | Continue? |
| "Pastel" | 2024 | — | Buff |
| "Super Power" | 2024 | 165 | Buff |
| "Whip" | 2024 | 101 | Awakening |
| "Butterfly" | 2025 | 110 | Butterfly |
| "Lost" | 2025 | 143 | Lost |
| "Sneakers" | 2026 | 88 | Off the Grid |
Lun8wave (sub-unit)
| "Playground" | 2023 | — | Non-album single |
"—" denotes a recording that did not chart or was not released in that territory

==== Japanese singles ====
List of singles, showing year released, selected chart positions and name of the album
| Title | Year | Peak chart positions | Sales | Album |
| Title | Year | JPN | Sales | Album |
|---|---|---|---|---|
| "Evergreen" | 2024 | 10 | JPN: 6,701 | Elevation |
| "Together Forever" | 2024 | 6 | JPN: 6,128 | Elevation |
| "Motley Crew" | 2025 | — | | Elevation |
"—" denotes a recording that did not chart or was not released in that territory

== Videography ==
=== Music videos ===
| Title | Year | Director | Ref. |
|---|---|---|---|
| "Wild Heart" | 2023 | 725 (SL8) | |
| "Voyager" | 2023 | Yeom Woo-jin (Secret Video Club) | |
| "Super Power" | 2024 | Sunny Lee (Visual Track) | |

== Awards and nominations ==
Name of the award ceremony, year presented, award category, nominee(s) and the result of the award
| Award ceremony | Year | Category | Nominee/work | Result | Ref. |
|---|---|---|---|---|---|
| Asia Artist Awards | 2023 | Focus Award – Music | Lun8 | Won | |
| Asia Top Awards | 2025 | Popular Rising Star | Lun8 | Won | |
| Golden Disc Awards | 2023 | Rookie of the Year | Lun8 | Nominated | |
