= Play-mate of the Apes =

2002 American erotic parody film

- Based on: Planet of the Apes by Pierre Boulle
- Written by: John Bacchus; John Paul Fedele; Joseph Ned; Debbie Rochon
- Directed by: John Bacchus
- Starring: Misty Mundae; Darian Caine; Debbie Rochon; Anoushka
- Theme music composer: John Paul Fedele; Kevin Neblung
- Country of origin: United States
- Original language: English

Production
- Producers: Michael Raso; Justin Wingenfeld
- Cinematography: John Paul Fedele
- Editor: George Freeway
- Running time: 89 minutes
- Production companies: E.I. Independent Cinema; Seduction Cinema

Original release
- Release: February 26, 2002

Play-mate of the Apes is a 2002 American direct-to-DVD erotic film directed by John Bacchus. A softcore pornographic film, it is a parody of the Planet of the Apes media franchise films and was released seven months after the Tim Burton-directed 2001 remake of the first film. The film features Misty Mundae in the lead role.

== Plot ==
In the distant future, astronaut Gaylor and her lesbian companions crash on an alien planet. They discard their spacesuits to indulge in lesbian pleasures. Gaylor and her crew discover that the planet is dominated by an intelligent and tyrannical race of apes who enslave humans. The three astronauts are captured and imprisoned, but Commander Gaylor uses her charms to seduce both the sympathetic ape, Doctor Cornholeous and the savage Uvula.

== Cast ==
- Misty Mundae as Commander Gaylor
- Darian Caine as Uvula
- Debbie Rochon as Dr. Cornholeous
- Anoushka as Lieutenant Pushkintucushkin
- Sharon Engert as Lieutenant Fornication
- Shelby Taylor as Barbarian Queen
- Dan Schwab as Ape With Pink Fur
- Zachary W. Snygg as Captain Laid
- Larry Wellman as Ape Lieutenant
- John Link as The Missing Link

== Filming and release ==
The film was produced by Seduction Cinema, a division of New Jersey–based production company, E.I. Independent Cinema. Shot in New Jersey in September 2001, it was released on DVD on February 26, 2002. In 2012, to commemorate the film's tenth anniversary, it was re-released on DVD, featuring two new commentary tracks and packaged with a comic book adaptation of the film.

== Reception ==
The film was given 2 out of 4 by Dr. Gore's Movie Reviews. It was described as a "low-budget softcore spoof heavily reliant on tinfoil and cheap red lights". A review at DVD Talk praised the film. Another commentator found the film had "[a]bsolutely no plot to get in the way of the story." In a negative review at Film Threat, Eric Campos wrote: "If I had to say something positive about Play-Mate of the Apes to save my life, it would be that the ape make-up actually looks just as good as the original film and the ending is far better than the one in Burton’s remake." In Screen Rant, Alexander Valentino wrote that the film "took the unnerving sexual undertones of Burton's film to the next level" and noted the comedic names of the characters.
