= Border: Carnival =

2021 EP by Enhypen

- Digital cover

EP by Enhypen
- Released: April 26, 2021
- Recorded: 2021
- Genre: Pop rock; R&B
- Length: 15:54
- Label: Belift Lab; Genie Music; Stone Music

Enhypen chronology
Border: Day One (2020)	Border: Carnival (2021)	Dimension: Dilemma (2021)

Singles from Border: Carnival
- 1. "Drunk-Dazed" Released: April 26, 2021

Border: Carnival (stylized in all caps) is the second extended play (EP) by South Korean boy band Enhypen. It was released on April 26, 2021, through Belift Lab. The album consists of six tracks, including the lead single "Drunk-Dazed".

== Background and release ==
On March 25, 2021, Belift Lab announced that Enhypen would make their comeback at the end of April. A trailer titled "Intro : The Invitation" was released on April 5, announcing that their second extended play Border: Carnival. On April 8, it was announced that the album pre-orders had surpassed 370,000 copies in three days. Prior to its release day, album pre-orders had surpassed 450,000 copies. The EP was released in conjunction with its lead single "Drunk-Dazed" on April 26. On May 4, the group received their first ever music show win on SBS MTV's The Show with "Drunk-Dazed". This was soon followed by wins on Show Champion and Music Bank. Border: Carnival debuted at number one on the Oricon Albums Chart, becoming the band's first chart-topper in Japan, with over 83,000 copies sold. On the chart dated May 29, 2021, Border: Carnival debuted at number 18 on the Billboard 200 chart.

== Track listing ==
Border: Carnival track listing
No.	Title	Writer(s)	Producer(s)	Length
1.	"Intro: The Invitation"	Wonderkid; Ca$hcow; Hybe	Wonderkid	2:10
2.	"Drunk-Dazed"	Wonderkid; Lil 27 Club; "Hitman" Bang; Melanie Joy Fontana; Michel "Lindgren" Schulz	Wonderkid; "Hitman" Bang	3:13
3.	"Fever"	Wonderkid; Ca$hcow; Moa "Cazzi Opeia" Carlebecker; Alexander Karlsson; Danke (Lalala Studio); January 8th; "Hitman" Bang	Wonderkid; Ca$hcow	2:52
4.	"Not for Sale"	Wyatt Sanders; Sermstyle; Jake Torrey; "Hitman" Bang; Danke (Lalala Studio); Kang Eun-jeong	Wyatt Sanders; Sermstyle	3:01
5.	"Mixed Up" (별안간; lit. 'Suddenly')	Wonderkid; Shinkung; Moa "Cazzi Opeia" Carlebecker; Alexander Karlsson; Lee Seu-ran; Lee Yi-jin; Denzil "DR" Remedios; Kang Eun-jeong; January 8th; Jo Yoon-kyung	Wonderkid; Shinkung	3:03
6.	"Outro: The Wormhole"	Wonderkid; Hybe	Wonderkid	1:34
Total length:				15:54

== Accolades ==
Awards and nominations for Border: Carnival
Ceremony	Year	Award	Result	Ref.
Gaon Chart Music Awards	2022	Album of the Year – 2nd Quarter	Nominated	
Seoul Music Awards	2022	Main Prize (Bonsang)	Won	

Music program awards
Song	Program	Date	Ref.
"Drunk-Dazed"	The Show	May 4, 2021	
"Drunk-Dazed"	Show Champion	May 5, 2021	
"Drunk-Dazed"	Music Bank	May 7, 2021	

Year-end lists
Publisher	List	Work	Rank	Ref.
IZM	2021 K-pop Albums of the Year	Border: Carnival	—N/a	
Marie Claire	20 Best New K-Pop Songs of 2021	"Fever"	10th	
NME	The 25 Best K-pop Songs of 2021	"Fever"	14th	
Time	The Best K-Pop Songs and Albums of 2021	"Fever"	—N/a	
Spotify	10 Best K-Pop Songs of 2021	"Fever"	8th	
Spotify	10 Best K-Pop Songs of 2021	"Drunk-Dazed"	7th	

== Charts ==
=== Weekly charts ===
Weekly chart performance
Chart (2021–2023)	Peak position
Austrian Albums (Ö3 Austria)	24
Belgian Albums (Ultratop Flanders)	17
Belgian Albums (Ultratop Wallonia)	44
Dutch Albums (Album Top 100)	26
Finnish Albums (Suomen virallinen lista)	14
French Albums (SNEP)	129
German Albums (Offizielle Top 100)	26
Hungarian Albums (MAHASZ)	11
Italian Albums (FIMI)	47
Japanese Albums (Oricon)	1
Japan Hot Albums (Billboard Japan)	1
Polish Albums (ZPAV)	28
South Korean Albums (Gaon)	1
Spanish Albums (Promusicae)	17
Swiss Albums (Schweizer Hitparade)	64
US Billboard 200	18
US World Albums (Billboard)	1

Chart (2025)	Peak position
Greek Albums (IFPI)	85

=== Monthly charts ===
Monthly chart performance
Chart (2021)	Peak position
Japanese Albums (Oricon)	1
South Korean Albums (Gaon)	1

=== Year-end charts ===
Year-end chart performance
Chart (2021)	Position
Japanese Albums (Oricon)	27
Japanese Hot Albums (Billboard Japan)	51
South Korean Albums (Gaon)	15

== Certifications and sales ==
Certifications
Region	Certification	Certified units/sales
Japan (RIAJ)	Gold	100,000^{^}
South Korea (KMCA)	Million	1,012,300
^{^} Shipments figures based on certification alone.

== Release history ==
Release formats for Border: Carnival
Region	Date	Format	Label	Ref.
Various	April 26, 2021	CD; digital download; streaming	Belift Lab; Genie Music; Stone Music Entertainment	
United States	May 14, 2021	CD	Belift Lab; Genie Music; Stone Music Entertainment	
