= Bite Me (Enhypen song) =

2023 single by Enhypen

Single by Enhypen

from the EP Dark Blood
- Language: Korean
- Released: May 22, 2023
- Recorded: 2023
- Genre: K-pop
- Length: 2:37
- Label: Belift Lab
- Songwriters: Cirkut; David Stewart; Jason Evigan; Lourdiz; Supreme Boi
- Producers: Cirkut; Jason Evigan

Enhypen singles chronology
"Make the Change" (2022)	"Bite Me" (2023)	"Sweet Venom" (2023)

Music video
- Bite Me on YouTube

"Bite Me" is a song recorded by South Korean boy band Enhypen for their fourth extended play (EP) Dark Blood. It was released as the EP's lead single by Belift Lab on May 22, 2023.

== Background and release ==
On April 24, 2023, Belift Lab announced that Enhypen's fourth extended play, Dark Blood, would be released on May 22. The track list was unveiled on May 16, revealing "Bite Me" as the lead single, with an album preview released on May 17. A music video teaser for the lead single "Bite Me" was revealed the following day. The song was released alongside its music video on May 22.

== Composition ==
"Bite Me" was written and composed by Cirkut, Jason Evigan, David Stewart, Lourdiz, and Supreme Boi, and was produced by Cirkut and Evigan. Additionally, group member Heeseung participated in the studio direction of the song.

== Music video ==
The music video for "Bite Me" was released on Hybe's YouTube channel alongside the song. The video depicted the members walking through ruins of a castle, playing chess with clones of themselves, and dancing with a paired female backup dancer. The choreography became a point of controversy, with fans split over the presence of the female dancers. Those who objected sent protest trucks with LED signs to Hybe's headquarters, which were countered by supportive fans sending their own trucks in retaliation. On September 5, 2023, an alternate music video for the song's Japanese version was released without the female dancers.

== Critical reception ==
Professional ratings
Review scores
Source	Rating
IZM	2.5/5 stars

In an album review for Dark Blood, Tássia Assis of NME praised "Bite Me" for its refrain and described the song as containing "the best of early-’00s boyband pop". Paste ranked the song at number 17 in their list of the 20 Best K-pop Songs of 2023, calling it "gloriously dramatic". On the other hand, Lee Hong-hyun of IZM wrote that it is the most "ordinary" title track of the group with minimal beats and a "dull" melody.

== Promotion ==
Enhypen performed "Bite Me" on multiple music programs during their first two weeks of promotions, including SBS's Inkigayo, Mnet's M Countdown, and KBS's Music Bank. On October 18, 2023, they performed the song on the The Kelly Clarkson Show.

== Accolades ==
Music program awards
Program	Date	Ref.
M Countdown	June 1, 2023	
Music Bank	June 2, 2023	

=== Year-end lists ===
Year-end lists
Publication	List	Rank	Ref.
Paste	The 20 Best K-pop Songs of 2023	17	
Riff	The 10 best K-pop songs of 2023	9	

== Charts ==
Weekly chart performance for "Bite Me"
Chart (2023)	Peak position
Global 200 (Billboard)	109
Japan (Japan Hot 100)	3
New Zealand (RMNZ)	16
South Korea (Circle)	66
US World Digital Song Sales (Billboard)	7
