= Suzy McCoppin =

American actress and columnist (born 1974)

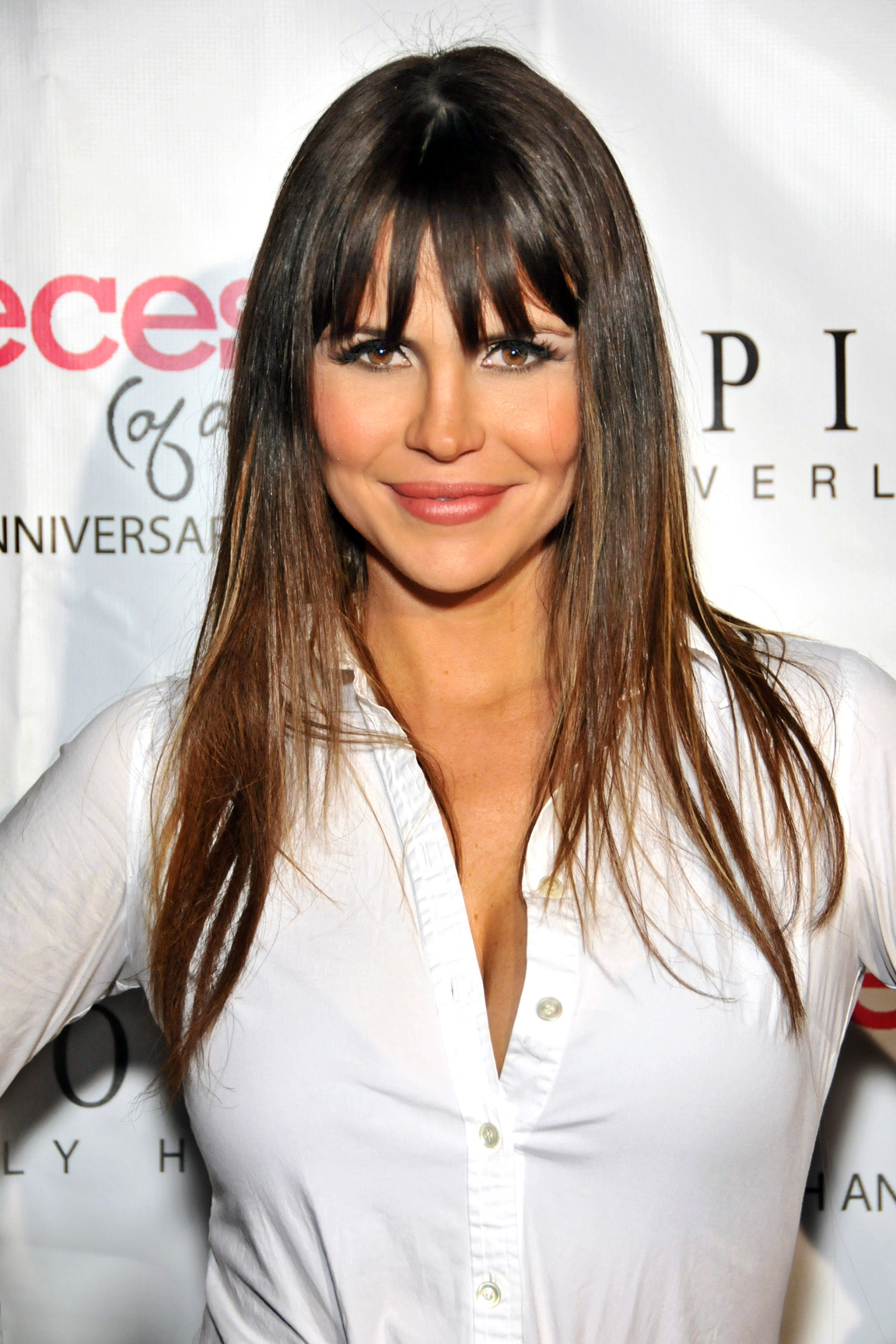
- McCoppin in West Hollywood, California on March 28, 2013
- Other name: Julian Wells
- Occupations: Actress, columnist, podcaster, author

Suzy McCoppin (born June 20, 1974) is an American actress and columnist whose subjects typically revolve around nightlife, dating, and sex.

== Early life ==
McCoppin was born in San Francisco, California and raised in the suburban town of Birmingham, Michigan. She attended Marian High School, an all-girls Catholic prep school. After graduating, she majored in drama at the Tisch School of the Arts at New York University and graduated in 1998.

== Career ==
McCoppin's early career began as an actress as she began doing commercials and bit parts on TV shows such as The Sopranos and Entourage. She also worked as a body double for stars such as Kim Cattrall, Kate Moss, and Ashley Judd. Between 2001 and 2010, she appeared in several films for the New Jersey-based production company Seduction Cinema, under the name Julian Wells. Later in her career, McCoppin covered nightlife for celebrity magazines such as Life & Style and In Touch, and served as a Los Angeles correspondent for British publications such as The Daily Mail and The Sun. In 2008, McCoppin became a nightlife and sex columnist for Playboy magazine, as well as a comedic online personality. She was a regular contributor to Playboy radio on Sirius and wrote articles for the pop culture website Popdust. McCoppin also hosted the Under Cover With Suzy McCoppin podcast for twenty-three episodes through July 2014.

In 2014, McCoppin and co-author Allison Swan co-wrote a book titled KissnTell which was a work of fiction, released digitally through publisher Full Fathom Five. The television rights to the book were purchased by E! with the intention of adapting it into a scripted television series.

== Charity work ==
McCoppin is a human rights advocate and has volunteered as a Freedom Writer for Amnesty International. She is a member of Food on Foot, a Los Angeles-based charity dedicated to helping the homeless. McCoppin has also dedicated much of her time to rescuing abused and neglected animals.
