= Hanbin =

Hanbin may refer to:

- Hanbin District, a district in Ankang, Shaanxi, China
- Hanbin Township, a township in Yining, Ili Kazakh Autonomous Prefecture, Xinjiang, China
- Wang Hanbin (born 1925), Chinese Communist Party politician
- He Hanbin (born 1986), Chinese badminton player
- Hanbin Ng (born 1989), Singaporean basketball player
- B.I (rapper) (Kim Han-bin; born 1996), South Korean rapper
- Hanbin (Ngô Ngọc Hưng; born 1998), member of the South Korean boy group Tempest formed by YH Entertainment

== See also ==
- Han-bin, a Korean given name, sometimes transliterated Hanbin
