= Studio Choom =

South Korean YouTube channel

- Official logo

YouTube information
- Channel: STUDIO CHOOM
- Years active: 2019–present
- Genre: Music
- Subscribers: 5.5 million
- Views: 3.8 billion
- Last updated: 3 February 2025

Studio Choom (Korean: 스튜디오 춤; RR: Seutyudio Chum; lit. 'Studio Dance'; stylized in all caps) is a South Korean YouTube channel that invites notable K-Pop acts to perform dances in a studio with white background and colored lights. Studio Choom is derived from the Mnet Digital Studio (M2) channel and is affiliated with Mnet.

== Concept ==
Studio Choom, just like its name, specialized in dance genre of K-Pop, they focused on capturing high quality performances of K-pop singers. The studio has white background and colored lights. The sets often feature backup dancers and usually lack any background props, highlighting only the professional performances of various K-Pop acts in high-quality resolution and frames with fancy camerawork.

== History ==
Studio Choom debuted as new content on the official YouTube channel of Mnet digital studio M2 in January 2019 and released Dance The X and Covers series. The content of this channel began to receive attention as GFriend's SinB's "Sweet but psycho" video by SinB uploaded on M2 YouTube channel. Also receiving attention was (G)I-DLE's SOOJIN's "7 Rings" video by SOOJIN which was uploaded on M2's website. As the CEO was a big fan of the idol.

Oneus is the first boy group that have been featured in Studio Choom, but they didn't have a main channel so it was uploaded in the M2 channel. When Studio Choom became independent as a separate channel, they released a performance video of Tomorrow X Together "Cat & Dog" 'Be Original' video on 12 May 2019. It surpassed 1 million subscribers in July 2020, less than two years after the channel was created.

On 25 January 2022, Studio Choom gave a special trophy to Stray Kids for their "God's Menu" 'Be Original' video and Itzy for their "Wannabe" 'Be Original' video to commemorate the first two 50M views videos on the channel.

In April 2022, Studio Choom launched new series called 'Mix & Max' where viewers can see a pair performance by two artist specializing in dance with Enhypen Jungwon and Ni-Ki as the first artists.

== List of performances ==
=== Studio Choom Original ===
Before called as 'Be Original' until 17 May 2024 changed to 'Studio Choom Original'.

==== 2019 ====
List of 'Be Original' Performance in 2019

| No. | Date | Artist | Song | Note(s) | Ref. |
|---|---|---|---|---|---|
| 1 | 4 May 2019 | TXT | "Cat & Dog" | | |
| 2 | 26 June 2019 | Chungha | "Snapping" | | |
| 3 | 29 June 2019 | Stray Kids | "Side Effects" | | |
| 4 | 25 July 2019 | CIX | "Movie Star" | | |
| 5 | 4 September 2019 | X1 | "Flash" | | |
| 6 | 17 October 2019 | AB6IX | "Blind For Love" | | |
| 7 | 20 October 2019 | Stray Kids | "Double Knot" | | |
| 8 | 26 October 2019 | Ateez | "Wonderland" | | |
| 9 | 5 November 2019 | HyunA | "Flower Shower" | | |
| 10 | 9 November 2019 | TXT | "New Rules" | | |
| 11 | 14 November 2019 | Dawn | "Money" | | |
| 12 | 21 November 2019 | CIX | "Numb" | | |
| 13 | 27 November 2019 | Got7 | "Thursday" | | |
| 14 | 30 November 2019 | Got7 | "Crash & Burn" | | |

==== 2020 ====
List of 'Be Original' Performance in 2020

| No. | Date | Artist | Song | Note(s) | Ref. |
|---|---|---|---|---|---|
| 15 | 10 January 2020 | Ateez | "Answer" | | |
| 16 | 4 February 2020 | GFriend | "Crossroads" | | |
| 17 | 11 February 2020 | Everglow | "Dun Dun" | | |
| 18 | 15 February 2020 | Moonbyul | "Eclipse" | | |
| 19 | 11 March 2020 | Victon | "Howling" | | |
| 20 | 14 March 2020 | Itzy | "Wannabe" | Received a 50M views trophy on 25 January 2022 | |
| 21 | 21 March 2020 | AleXa | "Do or die" | | |
| 22 | 28 March 2020 | Kang Daniel | "2U" | | |
| 23 | 9 April 2020 | (G)I-dle | "Oh my god" | | |
| 24 | 21 April 2020 | Got7 | "Not By The Moon" | | |
| 25 | 25 April 2020 | Got7 | "Poison" | | |
| 26 | 27 April 2020 | Chungha | "Stay Tonight" | | |
| 27 | 2 May 2020 | Oh My Girl | "Nonstop" | | |
| 28 | 9 May 2020 | Natty | "Nineteen" | | |
| 29 | 23 May 2020 | TXT | "Can't You See Me?" | | |
| 30 | 5 June 2020 | TXT | "Puma" | | |
| 31 | 27 May 2020 | Monsta X | "Fantasia" | | |
| 32 | 30 May 2020 | GWSN | "Wonderboy, the Aerialist" | | |
| 33 | 17 June 2020 | Iz*One | "Secret Story of the Swan" | | |
| 34 | 21 June 2020 | Stray Kids | "God's Menu" | Received a 50M views trophy on 25 January 2022; First Studio Choom video to achieve 50 million, 60 million and 70 million views | |
| 35 | 24 June 2020 | Seventeen | "Left & Right" | | |
| 36 | 28 June 2020 | Nature | "Girls" | | |
| 37 | 30 June 2020 | Sunmi | "pporappippam" | | |
| 38 | 4 July 2020 | AB6IX | "The Answer" | | |
| 39 | 9 July 2020 | Hwasa | "María" | | |
| 40 | 11 July 2020 | Woodz | "Love me harder" | | |
| 41 | 16 July 2020 | TOO | "Count 1, 2" | | |
| 42 | 24 July 2020 | Jeon Somi | "What You Waiting For" | | |
| 43 | 18 August 2020 | Itzy | "Not Shy" | | |
| 44 | 26 August 2020 | Cravity | "Flame" | | |
| 45 | 26 September 2020 | The Boyz | "The Stealer" | | |
| 46 | 28 September 2020 | Everglow | "La Di Da" | | |
| 47 | 7 October 2020 | WEi | "Twilight" | | |
| 48 | 24 October 2020 | Seventeen | Home;Run | | |
| 49 | 27 October 2020 | Twice | "I Can't Stop Me" | | |
| 50 | 30 October 2020 | CIX | "Jungle" | | |
| 51 | 31 October 2020 | TXT | "Blue Hour" (Dance Break ver.) | | |
| 52 | 6 November 2020 | AB6IX | "Salute" | | |
| 53 | 7 November 2020 | Monsta X | "Love Killa" | | |
| 54 | 12 November 2020 | GFriend | "Mago" | | |
| 55 | 3 December 2020 | Enhypen | "Given-Taken" | | |
| 56 | 5 December 2020 | Kai | "Mmmh" | | |

==== 2021 ====
List of 'Be Original' Performance in 2021

| No. | Date | Artist | Song | Note(s) | Ref. |
|---|---|---|---|---|---|
| 57 | 17 February 2021 | Chungha | "Bicycle" | | |
| 58 | 24 February 2021 | Sunmi | "Tail" | | |
| 59 | 26 February 2021 | Shinee | "Don't Call Me" | | |
| 60 | 3 March 2021 | Ateez | "Fireworks (I'm the One)" | | |
| 61 | 6 March 2021 | Rain (feat. Chungha) | "Why Don't We" | | |
| 62 | 7 March 2021 | Verivery | "Get Away" | | |
| 63 | 6 April 2021 | Hoshi | "Spider" | | |
| 64 | 7 April 2021 | Astro | "One" | | |
| 65 | 15 April 2021 | JO1 | "Born To Be Wild" | | |
| 66 | 21 April 2021 | Nu'est | "Inside Out" | | |
| 67 | 28 April 2021 | Enhypen | "Drunk-Dazed" | | |
| 68 | 1 May 2021 | Itzy | "In the Morning" | | |
| 69 | 14 May 2021 | NCT Dream | "Hot Sauce" | | |
| 70 | 21 May 2021 | TO1 | "Son of Beast" | | |
| 71 | 22 May 2021 | Taemin | "Advice" | | |
| 72 | 23 May 2021 | Aespa | "Next Level" | | |
| 73 | 12 June 2021 | TXT | "Magic" | | |
| 74 | 13 June 2021 | Twice | "Alcohol-Free" | | |
| 75 | 3 July 2021 | Just B | "Damage" | | |
| 76 | 4 August 2021 | Somi | "Dumb Dumb" | | |
| 77 | 7 August 2021 | Sunmi | "You can't sit with us" | | |
| 78 | 20 August 2021 | CIX | "Wave" | | |
| 79 | 25 August 2021 | T1419 | "Flex" | | |
| 80 | 27 August 2021 | Stray Kids | "Thunderous" | | |
| 81 | 4 September 2021 | Fromis 9 | "Talk & Talk" | | |
| 82 | 19 September 2021 | NCT 127 | "Sticker" | | |
| 83 | 25 September 2021 | Itzy | "Loco" | | |
| 84 | 2 October 2021 | E'Last | "Dark Dream" | | |
| 85 | 9 October 2021 | Jo Yu-ri | "Glassy" | | |
| 86 | 15 October 2021 | Enhypen | "Tamed-Dashed" | | |
| 87 | 17 October 2021 | Lightsum | "Vivace" | | |
| 88 | 27 October 2021 | INI | "Rocketeer" | | |
| 89 | 6 November 2021 | TO1 | "No More X" | | |
| 90 | 4 December 2021 | Kai | "Peaches"" | | |

==== 2022 ====
List of 'Be Original' Performance in 2022

| No. | Date | Artist | Song | Note(s) | Ref. |
|---|---|---|---|---|---|
| 91 | 6 January 2022 | Kep1er | "Wa Da Da" | | |
| 92 | 15 February 2022 | Viviz | "Bop Bop!" | | |
| 93 | 16 February 2022 | Apink | "Dilemma" | | |
| 94 | 18 February 2022 | Taeyeon | "INVU" | | |
| 95 | 25 February 2022 | Nmixx | "O.O" | | |
| 96 | 11 March 2022 | Nmixx | "Tank" | | |
| 97 | 18 March 2022 | (G)I-dle | "Tomboy" | | |
| 98 | 20 March 2022 | Stray Kids | "Maniac" | | |
| 99 | 1 April 2022 | NCT Dream | "Glitch Mode" | | |
| 100 | 16 April 2022 | Just B | "Re=Load" | | |
| 101 | 29 April 2022 | E'Last | "Creature" | | |
| 102 | 4 May 2022 | Le Sserafim | "Fearless" | | |
| 103 | 7 May 2022 | AleXa | "Wonderland" | | |
| 104 | 18 May 2022 | TNX | "Move" | | |
| 105 | 21 May 2022 | Astro | "Candy Sugar Pop" | | |
| 106 | 25 May 2022 | Kang Daniel | "Upside Down" | | |
| 107 | 26 May 2022 | Ciipher | "Fame" | | |
| 108 | 3 June 2022 | Jo Yu-ri | "Love Shhh!" | | |
| 109 | 17 June 2022 | Drippin | "Zero" | | |
| 110 | 22 June 2022 | Kep1er | "Up!" | | |
| 111 | 25 June 2022 | Nayeon | "Pop!" | | |
| 112 | 29 June 2022 | Fromis 9 | "Stay This Way" | | |
| 113 | 2 July 2022 | Sunmi | "Heart Burn" | | |
| 114 | 6 July 2022 | Enhypen | "Future Perfect (Pass the Mic)" | | |
| 115 | 12 July 2022 | Aespa | "Girls" | | |
| 116 | 15 July 2022 | Itzy | "Sneakers" | | |
| 117 | 16 July 2022 | Chungha | "Sparkling" | | |
| 118 | 20 July 2022 | STAYC | "Beautiful Monster" | | |
| 119 | 23 July 2022 | Blitzers | "Hit The Bass" | | |
| 120 | 28 July 2022 | Zico | "Freak" | | |
| 121 | 31 July 2022 | TO1 | "Drummin" | | |
| 122 | 29 July 2022 | Hoshi | "Tiger" | | |
| 123 | 2 August 2022 | NewJeans | "Attention" | | |
| 124 | 13 August 2022 | INI | "Password" | | |
| 125 | 31 August 2022 | Key | "Gasoline" | | |
| 126 | 2 September 2022 | Billlie | "Ring ma Bell" | | |
| 127 | 4 September 2022 | Tempest | "Can't Stop Shining" | | |
| 128 | 7 September 2022 | Oneus | "Same Scent" | | |
| 129 | 18 September 2022 | NCT 127 | "2 Baddies" | | |
| 130 | 21 September 2022 | Nmixx | "Dice" | | |
| 131 | 7 October 2022 | JO1 | "SuperCali" | | |
| 132 | 9 October 2022 | Stray Kids | "Case 143" | | |
| 133 | 15 October 2022 | Kep1er | "We Fresh" | | |
| 134 | 19 October 2022 | Le Sserafim | "Antifragile" | | |
| 135 | 8 November 2022 | Highlight | "Alone" | | |
| 136 | 25 November 2022 | STAYC | "Run2U" X K-Heritage | | |
| 137 | 8 December 2022 | &Team | "Under the skin" | | |

==== 2023 ====
List of 'Be Original' Performance in 2023

| No. | Date | Artist | Song | Note(s) | Ref. |
|---|---|---|---|---|---|
| 138 | 29 January 2023 | TXT | "Sugar Rush Ride" | | |
| 139 | 1 February 2022 | 8Turn | "Tic Tac" | | |
| 140 | 15 February 2023 | STAYC | "Teddy Bear" | | |
| 141 | 22 February 2023 | The Boyz | "Roar" | | |
| 142 | 28 February 2023 | Hwang Min-hyun | "Hidden Side" | | |
| 143 | 15 March 2023 | Kai | "Rover" | | |
| 144 | 3 April 2023 | Jimin | "Like Crazy" | | |
| 145 | 7 April 2023 | JO1 | "Tiger" | | |
| 146 | 11 April 2023 | Kep1er | "Giddy" | | |
| 147 | 12 April 2023 | Ive | "I Am" | | |
| 148 | 27 April 2023 | Epex | "Sunshower" | | |
| 149 | 3 May 2023 | Le Sserafim | "Unforgiven" | | |
| 150 | 10 May 2023 | Aespa | "Spicy" | | |
| 151 | 17 May 2023 | The Wind | "Island" | | |
| 152 | 18 May 2023 | INI | "Fanfare" | | |
| 153 | 24 May 2023 | Enhypen | "Bite Me" | | |
| 154 | 1 June 2023 | BoyNextDoor | "One and Only" | | |
| 155 | 4 June 2023 | Stray Kids | "S-Class" | | |
| 156 | 7 June 2023 | Taeyong | "Shalala" | | |
| 157 | 8 June 2023 | The New Six | "Kick It 4 Now" | | |
| 158 | 11 June 2023 | P1Harmony | "Jump" | | |
| 159 | 15 June 2023 | &Team | "Firework" | | |
| 160 | 27 June 2023 | 8Turn | "Excel" | | |
| 161 | 28 June 2023 | Shinee | "Hard" | | |
| 162 | 11 July 2023 | Zerobaseone | "In Bloom" | | |
| 163 | 12 July 2023 | Sandara Park | "Festival" | | |
| 164 | 21 July 2023 | NCT Dream | "ISTJ" | | |
| 165 | 3 August 2023 | The Wind | "We Go" | | |
| 166 | 6 August 2023 | Xikers | "Do or Die" | | |
| 167 | 8 August 2023 | Jeon Somi | "Fast Forward" | | |
| 168 | 21 August 2023 | Everglow | "Slay" | | |
| 169 | 5 September 2023 | DXTeen | "First Flight" | | |
| 170 | 6 September 2023 | Riize | "Get a Guitar" | | |
| 171 | 8 September 2023 | BoyNextDoor | "But Something" | | |
| 172 | 27 September 2023 | Oneus | "Baila Conmigo" | | |
| 173 | 1 October 2023 | XG | "Puppet Show" | | |
| 174 | 5 October 2023 | Epex | "Full Metal Jacket" | | |
| 175 | 12 October 2023 | 82Major | "First Class" | | |
| 176 | 13 October 2023 | Ive | "Baddie" | | |
| 177 | 14 October 2023 | TXT | "Chasing That Feeling" | | |
| 178 | 17 October 2023 | INI | "HANA_花" | | |
| 179 | 28 October 2023 | Le Sserafim | "Perfect Night" | | |
| 180 | 1 November 2023 | Taemin | "Guilty" | | |
| 181 | 8 November 2023 | Zerobaseone | "Crush" | | |
| 182 | 9 November 2023 | Soojin | "Agassy" | | |
| 183 | 11 November 2023 | WHIB | "Bang!" | | |
| 184 | 12 November 2023 | Stray Kids | "Lalalala" | | |
| 185 | 18 November 3023 | Enhypen | "Sweet Venom" | | |
| 186 | 20 November 2023 | &Team | "War Cry" | | |

==== 2024 ====
List of 'Be Original' / 'Studio Choom Original' Performance in 2024

| No. | Date | Artist | Song | Note(s) | Ref. |
|---|---|---|---|---|---|
| 187 | 15 February 2024 | INI | "Legit" | | |
| 188 | 16 February 2024 | N.SSign | "Happy &" | | |
| 189 | 19 February 2024 | TWS | "BFF" | | |
| 190 | 20 February 2024 | Bibi | "Sugar Rush" | | |
| 191 | 21 February 2024 | Le Sserafim | "Easy" | | |
| 192 | 28 February 2024 | Taeyong | "Tap" | | |
| 193 | 12 March 2024 | Highlight | "Body" | | |
| 194 | 26 March 2024 | Ampers&One | "Broken Heart" | | |
| 195 | 27 March 2024 | NCT Dream | "Smoothie" | | |
| 196 | 29 March 2024 | Unis | "Superwoman" | | |
| 197 | 1 April 2024 | Illit | "Magnetic" | | |
| 198 | 2 April 2024 | TXT | "Deja Vu" | | |
| 199 | 3 April 2024 | Nowadays | "OoWee" | | |
| 200 | 19 April 2024 | ME:I | "Click" | | |
| 201 | 20 April 2024 | Riize | "Impossible" | | |
| 202 | 22 April 2024 | BoyNextDoor | "Earth, Wind & Fire" | | |
| 203 | 30 April 2024 | Ive | "Heya" | | |
| 204 | 3 May 2024 | HyunA | "Q&A" | | |
| 205 | 17 May 2024 | Zerobaseone | "Feel the Pop" | First 'Studio Choom Original' performance | |
| 206 | 21 May 2024 | IS:SUE | "Connect" | | |
| 207 | 25 May 2024 | JO1 | "Love Seeker" | | |
| 208 | 4 June 2024 | Badvillain | "Badvillain" | | |
| 209 | 5 June 2024 | WayV | "Give Me That" | | |
| 300 | 16 June 2024 | Nayeon | "ABCD" | | |
| 301 | 19 June 2024 | INI | "Loud" | | |
| 302 | 28 June 2024 | TWS | "If I'm S, Can You Be My N?" | | |
| 303 | 2 July 2024 | STAYC | "Cheeky Icy Thang" | | |
| 304 | 3 July 2024 | Kiss of Life | "Sticky" | | |
| 305 | 9 July 2024 | (G)I-dle | "Klaxon" | | |
| 306 | 13 July 2024 | Enhypen | "XO (Only If You Say Yes)" | | |
| 307 | 8 August 2024 | Me:I | "Hi-Five" | | |
| 308 | 9 August 2024 | BamBam | "Last Parade" | | |
| 309 | 13 August 2024 | Fromis 9 | "Supersonic" | | |
| 310 | 21 August 2024 | ARrC | "S&S (sour and sweet)" | | |
| 311 | 22 August 2024 | Taemin | "Sexy In The Air" | | |
| 312 | 30 August 2024 | Le Sserafim | "Crazy" | | |
| 313 | 2 September 2024 | Zerobaseone | "Kill The Romeo" | | |
| 314 | 8 September 2024 | Tzuyu | "Run Away" | | |
| 315 | 10 September 2024 | BoyNextDoor | "Nice Guy" | | |
| 316 | 11 September 2024 | JO1 | "Where Do We Go" | | |
| 317 | 20 September 2024 | Yeonjun | "Ggum" | | |
| 318 | 2 October 2024 | Yena | "Nemo Nemo" | | |
| 319 | 17 October 2024 | Say My Name | "WaveWay" | | |
| 320 | 23 October 2024 | Illit | "Cherish (My Love)" | | |
| 321 | 24 October 2024 | TripleS VV | "Hit the Floor" | | |
| 322 | 25 October 2024 | INI | "WDMA (Where My Drums At)" | | |
| 323 | 26 October 2024 | Ampers&One | "He + She = We" | | |
| 324 | 30 October 2024 | The Boyz | "Trigger (導火線)" | | |
| 325 | 6 November 2024 | TXT | "Over the Moon" | | |
| 326 | 8 November 2024 | Viviz | "Shhh!" | | |
| 327 | 12 November 2024 | MiSaMo | "Identity" | | |
| 328 | 13 November 2024 | Enhypen | "No Doubt" | | |
| 329 | 19 November 2024 | Meovv | "Body" | | |
| 330 | 20 November 2024 | Nexz | "Nallina" | | |
| 331 | 27 November 2024 | TWS | "Last Festival" | | |
| 332 | 27 November 2024 | Izna | "Izna" | | |
| 333 | 4 December 2024 | Izna | "Timebomb" | | |
| 334 | 10 December 2024 | Twice | "Strategy" | | |

==== 2025 ====
List of 'Studio Choom Original' Performance in 2025

| No. | Date | Artist | Song | Note(s) | Ref. |
|---|---|---|---|---|---|
| 335 | 7 January 2025 | Gfriend | "Season of Memories" | | |
| 336 | 14 January 2025 | Ive | "Rebel Heart" | | |
| 337 | 21 January 2025 | Minnie | "HER" | | |
| 338 | 22 January 2025 | KickFlip | "Mama Said" | | |
| 339 | 28 January 2025 | Eunhyuk | "Up N Down" | | |
| 340 | 13 February 2025 | Evnne | "Hot Mess" | | |
| 341 | 19 February 2025 | Madein | "Love, Afraid" | | |
| 342 | 25 February 2025 | Zerobaseone | "Blue" | | |
| 343 | 26 February 2025 | Hearts2Hearts | "The Chase" | | |
| 344 | 5 March 2025 | NouerA | "N.I.N (New is Now)" | | |
| 345 | 11 March 2025 | Yeji | "Air" | | |
| 346 | 14 March 2025 | Say My Name | "ShaLala" | | |
| 347 | 15 March 2025 | Le Sserafim | "Hot" | | |
| 348 | 18 March 2025 | The Boyz | "VVV" | | |
| 349 | 19 March 2025 | Me:I | "Muse" | | |
| 350 | 21 March 2025 | One or Eight | "DTSM" | | |
| 351 | 22 March 2025 | J-Hope | "Mona Lisa" | | |
| 352 | 28 March 2025 | JO1 | "Be Classic" | | |
| 353 | 1 April 2025 | izna | "Sign" | | |
| 354 | 16 April 2025 | Kwon Eun-bi | "Hello Stranger" | | |
| 355 | 19 April 2025 | &Team | "Go in Blind" | | |
| 356 | 22 April 2025 | TWS | "Countdown" | | |
| 357 | 23 April 2025 | Kai | "Wait On Me" | | |
| 358 | 29 April 2025 | Meovv | "Hands Up" | | |
| 359 | 30 April 2025 | Highlight | "Chains" | | |
| 360 | 1 May 2025 | Katseye | "Gnarly" | | |
| 361 | 2 May 2025 | Riize | "Bag Bad Back" | | |
| 362 | 4 May 2025 | Nexz | "O-RLY?" | | |
| 363 | 14 May 2025 | Boynextdoor | "I Feel Good" | | |
| 364 | 20 May 2025 | I-dle | "Good Thing" | | |
| 365 | 27 May 2025 | Red Velvet Irene & Seulgi | "Tilt" | | |
| 366 | 28 May 2025 | KickFlip | "Freeze" | | |
| 367 | 6 June 2025 | Enhypen | "Bad Desire (With or Without You)" | | |
| 368 | 10 June 2025 | Itzy | "Girls Will Be Girls" | | |
| 369 | 18 June 2025 | Illit | "Do the Dance" | | |
| 370 | 24 June 2025 | AllDay Project | "Wicked" | | |
| 371 | 25 June 2025 | Baby DONT Cry | "F Girl" | | |
| 372 | 2 July 2025 | AHOF | "Rendezvous" | | |
| 373 | 9 July 2025 | Viviz | "La La Love Me" | | |
| 374 | 16 July 2025 | ifeye | "r u ok?" | | |
| 375 | 23 July 2025 | Tomorrow X Together | "Beautiful Strangers" | | |
| 376 | 6 August 2025 | Evnne | "How Can I Do" | | |
| 377 | 12 August 2025 | Key | "Hunter" | | |
| 378 | 13 August 2025 | AtHeart | "Plot Twist" | | |
| 379 | 20 August 2025 | Cortis | "What You Want" | | |
| 380 | 27 August 2025 | Ive | "XOXZ" | | |
| 381 | 2 September 2025 | NCT Wish | "Color" | | |
| 382 | 3 September 2025 | Zerobaseone | "Iconik" | | |
| 383 | 16 September 2025 | Yuqi | "M.O." | | |
| 384 | 17 September 2025 | IDID | "Chan-Ran" | | |
| 385 | 24 September 2025 | TWS | "Head Shoulders Knees Toes" | | |
| 386 | 27 September 2025 | P1Harmony | "EX" | | |
| 387 | 30 September 2025 | JO1 | "Handz in My Pocket" | | |
| 388 | 1 October 2025 | izna | "Mamma Mia" | | |
| 389 | 15 October 2025 | Meovv | "Burning Up" | | |
| 390 | 21 October 2025 | Boynextdoor | "Hollywood Action" | | |
| 391 | 22 October 2025 | Hearts2Hearts | "Focus" | | |
| 392 | 25 October 2025 | Le Sserafim | "Spaghetti" | | |
| 393 | 29 October 2025 | &Team | "Back to Life" | | |
| 394 | 5 November 2025 | Ahof | "Pinocchio" | | |
| 395 | 11 November 2025 | Itzy | "Tunnel Vision" | | |
| 396 | 26 November 2025 | Nowz | "Homerun" | | |
| 397 | 30 November 2025 | INI | "U Mine" | | |
| 398 | 11 December 2025 | AllDay Project | "Look at Me" | | |

=== Artist of the Month ===
List of 'Artist of the Month' performance, showing month, artist, song, dance team, and notes
| Month | Artist | Song | Team | Note(s) | Ref. |
2020
| October | Lee Chaeyeon of Iz*One | "16 Shots" | Choreographer: Ali (HypeUp) | | |
| October | Lee Chaeyeon of Iz*One | "Instruction" | | B-Side | |
| November | SinB of GFriend | "Tap In" | Choreographer: Eunju Kim / Soyeon Park | | |
| December | Soojin of (G)I-dle | "Got It" | Choreographer: Sehwan Kim, Hyunjin Kim | | |
2021
| January | U-Know of TVXQ | "My Strange Addiction" x "Vices" | Dancer: good_JS, Wootae, Sungchan, Bart Lee | | |
| March | Yeji of Itzy | "River" | Choreographer: Monroe Lee; Dancer: Nini, Moana, Soltuff, Anna co, Vara, Eunbyeol Jo | Received 50M views trophy on 11 April 2023; First 'Artist of the Month' video to achieve 50 million views | |
| June | Wooyoung of Ateez | "Bad" | Performance Director: B.B Trippin; Choreographer: B.B Trippin, Mr.Force | | |
| July | Yeonjun of TXT | "Watermelon Sugar" x "Blow" | Choreographer: Son Sungdeuk, Lee Byungeun; Dancer: TED, BLACK.Q, Kinky, Bono_Ryu, jjongii, Myungchul Joh, lily, chemi; Acrobatic: Baek jaewoo, Cho namgyu, Lee woobok, Lee jinsoo | | |
| August | Chaeryeong of Itzy | "Cry For Me" | Choreographer: Ali, Bell (hypeup); Dancer: Bell, Park Yeji, Choi Seowon, Lee Garam | | |
| September | Juyeon of The Boyz | "You Should See Me in a Crown" | Choreographer: Mihawkback; Dancer: Srpark, Jrick, Trandee rock, Charlie park | | |
| October | Hyunjin of Stray Kids | "Motley Crew" | Choreographer: MOTF (Beom Kim & Haeri Park); Dancer: Kim Taekwang / Kwon Hyukjin / Jung Younghyun / Kang Jinmo / Lee hwigun / Chae Seonjik / Kim Seongkwang / Woo Kijung / Jeong kyeongwon / Sim Eunseop | | |
| November | Ryujin of Itzy | "Therefore I Am" | Choreographer: Ali / Bell (hypeup); Dancer: Bell / Notto / Majorica / Garam | | |
2024
| May | Ni-Ki of Enhypen | "Trendsetter" x "Humble" | Choreographer: Yumeki / The Bips (Bico Lim & Taehoon Kim & Woowon); Performance Director: Myung Sangwoo / Kim Kwangwon / Kim Seunghyeon / Kim Jieun; Dancer: Barbie / Bico Lim / Taehoon Kim / Woowon / Juno Park / Needs / Taehee Jeong / Lee Su | | |
| July | Sung Han-bin of Zerobaseone | "Bad Boy" (Original song composed by DRD & Jessica Pierpoint) | Choreographer: Bada Lee / Jrick Back; Tutting choreographer: Spella; Performance director: Bang Jaeyeob; Dancer: Spella / Lusher / Leesu / Tatter / Eunki / Sowon / Injeong / Hyunmin / Shabo / Chanyoung / Hyunjun | | |
| December | Shotaro of Riize | "Clique" (Original track by Ye) | Dance break: no2zcat / goldash; Performance director: Jiwoong Sa; Choreographer: THE BIPS / Michael Burt; Dancer: Leemoonjun / Jungsuyoung / JungSeokChae / Hui / ParkJinHyeok / Leeyubin / KangKiPyo / YoonDaeHan / Woowon / Jeonsangdoo | | |

=== Mix & Max ===
'Mix & Max' is where two dancers perform in a pair.

| Release Date | Artist | Song | Note(s) | Ref. |
|---|---|---|---|---|
| 23 April 2022 | Jungwon & Ni-Ki (Enhypen) | "Bleeding Darkness" | | |
| 11 June 2022 | Yeji & Ryujin (Itzy) | "Break My Heart Myself" | First 'Mix & Max' video to achieve 50 million and 60 million views; Released a remix collaboration with Bebe Rexha because of its popularity | |
| 3 December 2022 | Chan & Renta (TO1) | "Street Boy" & "Kingsman" | | |
| 17 March 2023 | Q & Sunwoo (The Boyz) | "Thunder" | | |
| 28 July 2023 | Yeonjun & Huening Kai (TXT) | "Tempted" + "The Devil I Know" | | |
| 20 August 2023 | Mark & Jisung (NCT) | "Some Minds" & "Voices" | | |

=== Collaborations ===
==== Studio Choom X KCON ====
| Release Date | Artist | Song Title | Notes | Ref. |
KCON LA 2019
| 31 August 2019 | Ateez | "Wave" etc. | 'Drop the Dance' | |
KCON 19TH
| 9 October 2019 | (G)I-dle | "Latata" X "Hann (Alone)" X "Uh-Oh" X "Senorita" | 'Dance the X' | |
| 23 October 2019 | The Boyz | "D.D.D" etc. | 'Drop the Dance' | |
| 28 October 2019 | AB6IX | "Breathe" etc. | 'Drop the Dance' | |
KCON LA 2022
| 22 August 2022 | STAYC | "ASAP" X "Run2U" X "So Bad" X "Stereotype" X "Beautiful Monster" | 'Dance the X' | |
| 8 September 2022 | Kep1er | "Up!" etc. | 'Drop the Dance' | |
| 24 September 2022 | TO1 | "Drummin'" etc. | 'Drop the Dance' | |
| 29 September 2022 | Nmixx | "O.O" etc. | 'Drop the Dance' | |
KCON SAUDI ARABIA 2022
| 12 October 2022 | Oneus | "Lit" X "Valkyrie" X "Same Scent" | 'Dance the X' | |
KCON JAPAN 2024
| 18 May 2024 | JO1 | "SuperCali" X "Tiger" X "INFINITY" X "Venus" X "Test Drive" | 'Dance the X' | |
| 22 May 2024 | INI | "FANFARE" X "Rocketeer" X "SPECTRA" X "HANA_花" X "LEGIT" | 'Dance the X' | |
| 23 May 2024 | &Team | "Samidare(五月雨)" etc. | 'Drop the Dance' | |
| 25 May 2024 | NiziU | "Heartis" etc. | 'Drop the Dance' | |
| 29 May 2024 | P1Harmony | "JUMP" X "둠두둠" X "겁나니" X "Back Down" X "때깔 (Killin' It)" | 'Dance the X' | |
| 7 June 2024 | BoyNextDoor | "Earth, Wind & Fire" etc. | 'Drop the Dance' | |
KCON LA 2024
| 2 August 2024 | Zerobaseone | "Feel the Pop" etc. | 'Drop the Dance' | |
| 3 August 2024 | Me:I | "Click" etc. | 'Drop the Dance' | |
| 4 August 2024 | INI | "Loud" etc. | 'Drop the Dance' | |

==== We Lit X Street Woman Fighter ====
In collaboration with dance competition program Street Woman Fighter, Studio Choom released a performance video of the 6 teams that advanced to the semi-finals on October 23, 2021.

| Dance Crew | Crew Members | Title |
|---|---|---|
| HolyBang | Honey J, Loa, Mull, Eevee, Jane, Taro, Hertz | "Birthday" |
| Hook | Aiki, Rageon, Yoonkyung Seon, JiYeon Sung, Yebon, Odd, Hyowoo | "Bruno Mars Mix" |
| Lachica | Gabee, Rian, Simeez, H_1, Peanut | "Pure Water" |
| CocoaNButter | Rihey, Zsun, Gaga, Bicky | "Mad Max" |
| YGX | Leejung Lee, Yeojin, Yell, Isak, Jihyo Park | "Pretty Savage" |
| Prowdmon | Monika, Lip J, Dia, Rosy, Kayday, Ham.G, Kyam | "Womanifesto" |

==== Studio Choom X Boys Planet ====
In collaboration with idol survival program Boys Planet, Studio Choom released a video performance of the winning team of K vs G Battle round on 1 March 2023.

| Team | Team Members | Song Title |
|---|---|---|
| K Group | Kim Ji-woong, Kim Tae-rae, Han Yu-jin, Yoon Jong-woo, Kim Min-seoung, Kum Jun-hyeon, Ji Yun-seo | "Back Door" (Original song by Stray Kids) |

=== Covers ===
List of 'Covers' in 2019 & 2020 (discontinued series)

| Date | Artist | Song | Notes |
|---|---|---|---|
| 9 February 2019 | Choi Yoojung X Ellen | K-Pop Boy Groups Choreography : BTS – "DNA" / "Idol"; Seventeen – "Thanks"; EXO – "Love Shot"; Wanna One – "Spring Breeze"; NCT U – "Boss" | Uploaded on M2 YouTube channel |
| 16 February 2019 | Seungyeon of CLC | Freestyle Choreography of Original Track | Uploaded on M2 YouTube channel |
| 27 February 2019 | Soojin | Freestyle choreography of "Invitation" (Original song by Uhm Jung-hwa) | Uploaded on M2 YouTube channel |
| 2 March 2019 | Soojin | "7 Rings" (Original song by Ariana Grande) | Uploaded on M2 YouTube channel |
| 6 March 2019 | Hwanwoong of Oneus | "Love Shot" (Original song by Exo) | Uploaded on M2 YouTube channel |
| 9 March 2019 | Oneus | "Bad Blood" (Original song by Nao) | Uploaded on M2 YouTube channel |
| 13 March 2019 | Kim Dong-han | "Want" (Original song by Taemin) | Uploaded on M2 YouTube channel |
| 16 March 2019 | Kim Dong-han | "Natural" (Original song by Imagine Dragons) | Uploaded on M2 YouTube channel |
| 27 March 2019 | Roh Tae-hyun | "Bury a Friend" (Original song by Billie Eilish) | Uploaded on M2 YouTube channel |
| 30 March 2019 | Roh Tae-hyun | "7 Rings" (Original song by Ariana Grande) | Uploaded on M2 YouTube channel |
| 24 April 2019 | BM | "Kill This Love" (Original song by BlackPink) | Uploaded on M2 YouTube channel |
| 27 April 2019 | BM | "Rock Your Body" (Original song by Chris Brown) | Uploaded on M2 YouTube channel |
| 8 May 2019 | Exy | "Havana" (Original song by Camila Cabello) | Uploaded on M2 YouTube channel |
| 10 May 2019 | Yeoreum | "'Yoncé" (Original song by Beyoncé) | Uploaded on M2 YouTube channel |
| 11 May 2019 | Exy X Yeoreum of WJSN | "I Don't Like You" (Original song by Leaf) | Uploaded on M2 YouTube channel |
| 22 May 2019 | Soojin | "7 Rings" (No Edit) (Original song by Ariana Grande) | |
| 15 June 2019 | SinB X Mina Myoung | "Sweet but Psycho" (Original song by Ava Max) | Uploaded on M2 YouTube channel |
| 18 July 2019 | Kangmin of Verivery | "Overdose" (Original song by Exo) | Uploaded on M2 YouTube channel |
| 20 July 2019 | Verivery | "Wu, 119" (Remix by SMTM777) | Uploaded on M2 YouTube channel |
| 24 July 2019 | Kino | "Señorita" (Original song by Shawn Mendes and Camila Cabello) | Uploaded on M2 YouTube channel |
| 27 July 2019 | Kino | "No Guidance" (Original song by Chris Brown) | Uploaded on M2 YouTube channel |
| 31 July 2019 | YooA | "Happy" (Original song by Pharrell Williams) | |
| 3 August 2019 | YooA | "Sucker" (Original song by Jonas Brothers) | |
| 27 February 2020 | Everglow | "No Tears Left to Cry" (Original song by Ariana Grande) | |

== Accolades ==
| Award ceremony | Year | Category | Nominee / work | Result | Ref. |
|---|---|---|---|---|---|
| LIT Talent Awards | 2022 | Best Dance Video | 'Mix & Max' | Platinum Award | |
| MUSE Awards | 2022 | Video-Music | 'Mix & Max' | Platinum Award | |
| NYX Video Awards | 2021 | Music | 'Artist of the Month' | Won | |
| NYX Video Awards | 2021 | Entertainment (YouTube / Vimeo) | 'Artist of the Month' | Won | |
| NYX Video Awards | 2021 | Celebrities / Fan | 'Artist of the Month' | Won | |
