= 30th Hanteo Music Awards =

2023 South Korean music award ceremony

- Official poster
- Sponsored by: Ministry of Culture, Sports and Tourism; Korea Tourism Organization
- Date: February 10–11, 2023
- Venue: Jamsil Arena, Seoul
- Country: South Korea
- Presented by: Hanteo Global
- Hosted by: Eugene; Shin Dong-yup; Hyunsuk; Baekseung

Highlights
- Most awards: BTS (5)
- Website: awards.hanteo.com

Television/radio coverage
- Network: SBS M; Mnet Japan

The 30th Hanteo Music Awards (Korean: 30주년 한터뮤직어워즈 2022; RR: 30junyeon hanteo myujig eo-weojeu 2022; lit. '30th Anniversary Hanteo Music Awards 2022') presented by Hanteo Global was held at Jamsil Arena in Seoul on February 10–11, 2023. It recognized the best artists and recordings, primarily based on Hanteo Chart data gathered from January 1 to December 31, 2022. The ceremony was hosted by Eugene, Shin Dong-yup, Hyunsuk and Baekseung.

It was broadcast live on SBS M and Mnet Japan. It was also available to watch live on online platforms Mnet Smart+ and Idolplus.

This was also the first offline awards ceremony of Hanteo Chart in celebration of their thirtieth anniversary.

== Criteria ==
All songs and albums that are eligible to be nominated must be released from January to December 2022.

Category	Hanteo Global score (Note: Hanteo Global score reflects a comprehensive analysis based on the vast amount of big data of albums/records, digital music, social media, portals, broadcasting & media, and end users collected through 'Hanteo Chart' and 'Whosfan Big Data Lab'.)	Global voting score	Judging score
Best Artist (Daesang)	50%	20%	30%
Best Album (Daesang)	50%	20%	30%
Best Song (Daesang)	50%	20%	30%
Best Performance (Daesang)	50%	20%	30%
Main Prize (Bonsang)	40%	30%	30%
Global Artist Award	50%	50%	—N/a
Post Generation Award	40%	30%	30%
Emerging Artist Award	40%	30%	30%
Rookie of the Year Award	40%	30%	30%
WhosFandom Award	—N/a	100%	—N/a
Special Award	30%	40%	30%
Trend Award	30%	—N/a	70%

== Winners and nominees ==
Winners and nominees are listed in alphabetical order. Winners listed first and emphasized in bold. The list of nominees except Best Artist, Best Album, Best Song and Best Performance was announced on December 13, 2022, through the Hanteo News website. Voting opened (except for WhosFandom) on Whosfan mobile application on December 13, 2022, and closed on January 26, 2023. The list of nominees for WhosFandom Award was announced through Twitter on December 14, 2022.

=== Main awards ===
Best Artist (Daesang)	Best Album (Daesang)
**BTS**	**NCT Dream**
Best Song (Daesang)	Best Performance (Daesang)
**BTS**	**Stray Kids**
Main Award (Bonsang)	Rookie of the Year Award
**(G)I-dle**; **Aespa**; **Blackpink**; **BTS**; **Enhypen**; **Ive**; **Kang Daniel**; **Kim Ho-joong**; **Lim Young-woong**; **NCT Dream**; **NCT 127**; **Seventeen**; **STAYC**; **Stray Kids**; **TXT**; **Young Tak**; List of nominated artists: Astro; Ateez; BamBam; Billlie; BtoB; CIX; Cravity; Dreamcatcher; Epex; Fromis 9; Girls' Generation; Got7; iKon; Itzy; J-Hope; Jackson Wang; Jin; Jo Yu-ri; Kep1er; Kihyun; Le Sserafim; Mamamoo; Monsta X; Nayeon; NewJeans; Nmixx; P1Harmony; Psy; Red Velvet; RM; SF9; Super Junior; Taeyeon; The Boyz; TNX; Treasure; Twice; Verivery; Winner; WJSN; Wonho; Yena; Younha; Zico	Female: **Kep1er**; **NewJeans**; Male: **TNX**; **Tempest**; List of nominated artists: Artbeat; Chaeyeon; Classy; CSR; Fifty Fifty; H1-Key; ILY:1; Irris; Lapillus; Le Sserafim; LimeLight; Mimiirose; Nmixx; Queenz Eye; TripleS; Viviz; WSG Wannabe; Aimers; ATBO; Black Level; Blank2y; Jwiiver; Nine.i; Superkind; TAN; Trendz; Xeed; Younite
Post Generation Award	Emerging Artist Award
**CIX**; **Everglow**; **Fromis 9**; **Jeong Dong-won**; AB6IX; Big Naughty; Cravity; DKZ; Jeon Somi; Kang Daniel; Kard; Oneus; The Boyz; TO1; Verivery	**Billlie**; **Epex**; **P1Harmony**; **WEi**; Be'O; Drippin; E'Last; Jo Yu-ri; Kingdom; Mirae; Omega X; Purple Kiss; Weeekly
WhosFandom Award
**BTS**; List of nominated artists: (G)I-dle; Aespa; Astro; Ateez; Big Bang; Blackpink; CIX; Cravity; Dreamcatcher; Enhypen; Epex; Exo; Fromis 9; Girls' Generation; Got7; iKon; Itzy; IU; Ive; Kep1er; Kim Ho-joong; Le Sserafim; Lim Young-woong; Mamamoo; Monsta X; NCT; NewJeans; Red Velvet; Seventeen; STAYC; Stray Kids; The Boyz; TNX; Treasure; TXT; Twice; WJSN; Wonho; Yena

=== Global Artist awards ===
All the Continents
**BTS**
Africa	Asia
**Jin**	**TXT**
Europe	North America
**The Boyz**	**Dreamcatcher**
Oceania	South America
**Monsta X**	**Blackpink**
China	Japan
**SF9**	**Stray Kids**

=== Special awards ===
Ballad	Hip-hop	Trot
**Lee Seok-hoon**; **Younha**	**Be'O**	**Kim Ho-joong**

=== Trend awards ===
Blooming Band Performer	Focus Star
**Lucy**	**Verivery**
Generation Icon	Top Trending Artist
**Red Velvet**	**Yuju**
Wannabe Icon
**Yena**

=== Other awards ===
Other Categories	Winner
Blooming Star	Blank2y
Blooming Star	Blitzers
Blooming Star	Cignature
Blooming Star	Just B
Blooming Star	Tri.be
Global Rising Artist – China	Tempest
Global Rising Artist – Japan	Tempest
New Korean Wave Star	TAN

== Presenters ==
The list of presenters was announced on January 27, 2023.

Day 1

Order of the presentation, name of the artist(s), and award(s) they presented
Order	Artist(s)	Presented
1	Son Jun-ho & Kim So-hyun	Emerging Artist Award (Billie & WEi) & Special Award (Ballad)
2	Kim Tae-won & Hong Jin-young	Blooming Band Performer & Post Generation Award (Jeong Dong-won & Everglow)
3	Tony Ahn & Narsha	Main Award (Kang Daniel & STAYC)
4	Minzy	Blooming Star (Tri.be, BLANK2Y, BLITZERS & JustB) & New Korean Wave Star
5	Sean (Jinusean)	Focus Star & Generation Icon
6	Kim Hyung-jun & Seo In-young	Main Award (Kim Ho-joong, BLACKPINK, NCT-127 & Stray Kids)
7	Jin Seong & Kim Kyung-rok (V.O.S)	Top Trending Artist & Special Award (Trot)

Day 2

Order of the presentation, name of the artist(s), and award(s) they presented
Order	Artist(s)	Presented
1	Lee Hyun-do (Deux)	Special Award (Hip Hop) & Wannabe Icon
2	Danny Ahn & Bada	Main Award (Young Tak, Lim Young-woong, (G)-IDLE & TXT)
3	Tei & Soyou	Blooming Star (Cignature), Post Generation Award (Fromis_9 & CIX) & Emerging Artist Award (Epex & P1Harmony)
4	Yubin	Global Artist Award & Global Rising Artist
5	Kim Hyun-jung & Shin Hyo-bum	Rookie of the Year Award & WhosFandom Award
6	Lee Ji-hoon & Jang Su-won	Main Award (NCT Dream, BTS, Ive & Enhypen)
7	Hanteo's CEO Kwak Yeon-ho	Grand Prize (Best Song, Best Artist, Best Performance & Best Album)

== Performers ==
The lineup was announced on January 30, 2023.

Day 1

Order of the performance, name of the artist(s), and song(s) they performed
Order	Artist(s)	Song performed
1	TAN	"Anysong" (Orig. Seo Taiji and Boys)
1	BLANK2Y (Louis & DK)	"Twist King" (Orig. Turbo)
1	Tri.be	"('Cause) I'm Your Girl" (Orig. S.E.S)
1	BLANK2Y (Park Donghyuk, Park Siwoo, Mikey, U, Lee Youngbin, Lee Sungjun & Park Sodam)	"Heartbeat" (Orig. 2PM)
2	LUCY	"Play"
3	Younha	"Event Horizon"
4	Billlie	Intro Perf. + "Ring Ma Bell (What a Wonderful World)"
5	WEi	Intro Perf. + "Spray"
6	STAYC	Intro + "Beautiful Monster" + "Poppy" (Korean Ver.)
7	JustB	"Damage"
8	BLANK2Y	"Fuego (Fearless)"
9	Everglow	Intro + "Dun Dun" + "Pirate"
10	Tri.be	"Kiss"
11	TAN	Intro + "Du Du Du" + "Louder"
12	VERIVERY	Intro Perf. + "Undercover"
13	WeDemBoyz	Intro Perf. + "New Thing" (Prod. and Performed By Zico) (Feat. Homies) + "Domestic" (Rain) + "Lit" (Prod. Czaer) (NCT (Taeyong & Mark))
14	Blitzers	"Friday Night" (Orig. g.o.d)
14	JustB	"Girls Girls Girls" (Orig. Got7)
14	Everglow	"Fire" (Orig. 2NE1)
15	Yuju	"Cold Winter" + "Evening"
16	Jeon Dong-won	"A Real Man" + "Baennori"
17	Kang Daniel	Intro + "Touchin'" + "Nirvana" (with WeDemBoyz)
18	Kim Ho-joong	Intro + "Friend" + "Brucia La Terra"

Day 2

Order of the performance, name of the artist(s), and song(s) they performed
Order	Artist(s)	Song performed
1	Omega X	"I Pray 4 U" (Orig. Shinhwa) + Dance Break + "Don't Wanna Cry" (Re-arranged Ver.) (Orig. Seventeen)
1	Dreamcatcher	"Now" (Orig. Fin.K.L)
1	EPEX	"I Need U" (Orig. BTS)
2	Be'O	"Counting Stars" + "Love Me"
3	Yena	"Love War" (Solo Ver.)
4	Cignature	"Aurora"
5	Omega-X	"Dream"
6	CIX	Intro Perf. + "458"
7	Epex	Intro Perf. + "Anthem of Teen Spirit"
8	Fromis_9	"Stay this Way" (Night Ver.) + "DM"
9	Tempest	Intro Perf. + "Dragon" + "Bad News"
10	Dreamcatcher	Intro Perf. ("Maison") + "Vision"
11	Kep1er	Intro Perf. + "The Girls (Can't Turn Me Down)" + "Wa Da Da" (HMA Remix)
12	Young-Tak	Intro + "The Wall" + Brief Announcement + "MMM"
13	Cignature	"Tell Me Your Wish (Genie)" (Orig. Girls' Generation)
13	Tempest	"Fantastic Baby" (Orig. Big Bang)
13	CIX	"View" (Orig. SHINee)
14	NCT Dream	"Beatbox" + "Glitch Mode" + "Candy"
