= Han-bin =

- Hangul: 한빈
- RR: Hanbin
- MR: Hanbin

Han-bin is a Korean given name.

Notable people with this name include:

- Lee Han-bin (born 1988), South Korean short track speed skater
- Amadéus Leopold (born Yoo Hanbin, 1988), South Korean violinist
- Kim Han-bin (born 1991), South Korean football player
- Yang Han-been (born 1991), South Korean football player
- B.I (rapper) (born Kim Han-bin, 1996), South Korean rapper
- Park Han-bin (born 2002) South Korean singer and dancer, member of boy band Evnne
- Park Han-bin (born 1997), South Korean football player
- Sung Han-bin (born 2001), South Korean singer and dancer, member of boy band Zerobaseone
- Hanbin (born Ngô Ngọc Hưng, 1998), Vietnamese singer, member of boy band Tempest

== See also ==
- List of Korean given names
