= I-Land =

South Korean reality competition series

- Promotional poster
- Hangul: 아이랜드
- RR: Airaendeu
- MR: Airaendŭ
- Genre: Reality competition
- Directed by: Shin Jeong-su (Planning); Kim Shin-yeong; Jung Min-seok (Producers)
- Presented by: Namkoong Min
- Opening theme: "Into the I-Land" by IU
- Ending theme: "I&credible" by I-land
- Country of origin: South Korea
- Original language: Korean
- No. of seasons: 2
- No. of episodes: 12

Production
- Executive producer: Bang Si-hyuk
- Running time: 90 minutes; 200 minutes (finale)
- Production companies: Studio Take One (Note: A subsidiary of CJ ENM); Mnet; CJ ENM; HYBE

Original release
- Network: Mnet
- Release: June 26 – September 18, 2020

Related
- &Audition – The Howling; R U Next?; I-Land 2: N/a

I-Land (Korean: 아이랜드; stylised in all caps) is a South Korean reality competition series produced by Mnet and organized by Belift Lab, which at the time of airing was a joint venture between entertainment companies CJ ENM and Hybe.

Twenty-three male trainees participated in the show, of which seven were selected to debut as Enhypen in the show's finale on September 18, 2020. The winning contestants were Jungwon, Jay, Jake, Ni-Ki, Heeseung, Sunghoon, and Sunoo; the first six members were decided by global ranking, and the seventh by producer's choice.

A second season, I-Land 2, was expected to premiere in the first half of 2022 featuring female trainees; however, on July 15, 2022, it was announced that it would be postponed. Instead in 2023, HYBE partnered with JTBC to produce R U Next? featuring trainees who would debut in Illit signing with Belift Lab, becoming labelmates with Enhypen.

On July 24, 2023, Mnet announced the second season of I-Land titled I-Land 2: N/a, not in affiliation with Hybe or Belift Lab and featuring female trainees. The show started airing in April 2024, in collaboration and production from The Black Label founded by Teddy, with the final lineup debuting in WakeOne.

== Promotion and broadcast ==
On May 14, 2020, Mnet released the first teaser video for I-Land and introduced the participating producers and mentors. Beginning on June 1, the contestants were revealed.

The show premiered on June 26 on the cable channels Mnet, tvN Korea, Mnet Japan, and tvN Asia (Asia-Pacific). It aired in other countries via Mnet Smart, AbemaTV (Japan), Joox (Hong Kong, Indonesia, Malaysia, Myanmar, Thailand); on the Mnet K-POP & Hybe Labels YouTube channels and Rakuten Viki (worldwide except certain regions). The first part of the show ended on July 31. The second part of the show aired from August 14 to September 18.

A special episode, titled "I-LAND Special: The New Beginning", aired on August 7, with Hwang Kwang-hee, Apink's Kim Nam-joo, Momoland's JooE, vocal coach Kim Sung-eun and DOOBU as hosts. In addition to recapping the events of the first half of the show, the hosts previewed the second part, including increased participation of global viewers, more performances, and specials appearances by BTS and Seventeen.

BTS and Tomorrow X Together appeared as guests on the final episode, broadcast live with an earlier time slot, at 8:00 p.m. KST.

== Concept ==
Twenty-two (twenty-three until episode 6) trainees are brought to a complex, called the I-Land, in the middle of nowhere surrounded by a lush green forest for 113 days. The trainees will live together in the three-floor complex with modern living spaces, gym, dance studios, item room (for storage), and individual practice rooms; however, only 12 contestants can stay at any one time. The others will be on the "Ground", a simple building with a dance studio and dining area, and will have to commute to and from the I-Land building every day at set times. The two living spaces are connected by a gate and stage, where their skills will be evaluated. A key part of the show's concept is that both the participants' and producers' votes play a heavy role, as they decide who stays in I-Land and who goes to the Ground. Although the I-Land only accommodates 12 trainees, the trainees may be dropped and demoted to the Ground and promptly be replaced by trainees from the Ground.

While the show primarily focuses on the trainees and producers votes, the audience can vote on who remains in the I-Land in the last part of part one of the show. Based on the results, any trainees in the Ground will be eliminated. From there, the I-Landers will compete among themselves in the second part of the series to determine who will debut in the final seven-member group. In the second part, only the producers and audience can vote. Thus, the show was originally supposed to focus on trainee and producer votes without much audience influence, but in part 2 of the show, the trainees did not vote at all, and global votes were introduced.

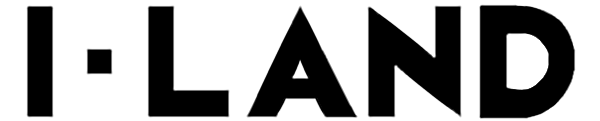
The I-LAND logo (retouched)

Actor Namkoong Min served as I-Land's official host, commentator and narrator. The contestants were evaluated by main producer Bang Si-hyuk, CEO of Big Hit Music, as well as South Korean singer Rain and rapper Zico, both of whom rose to prominence in K-pop and K-hip hop, respectively, in the early 21st century. Rain and Zico will also mentor the trainees.

A first in South Korean survival programs, Big Brother-style live cameras display multi-camera footage from inside the I-Land and Ground in a one-hour, video on demand segment called I-LAND Cam. New videos released every Monday, Wednesday, Friday, and Saturday on the Weverse app and its website. In the last week of the show, I-LAND Cam streamed live in real-time, every day for one hour starting at 6PM KST; on the final day, for the final episode, I-LAND Cams streamed live starting at 5AM KST.

== Cast ==
Storyteller: Namkoong Min

Producers:

- Bang Si-hyuk
- Rain (Part 1 only)
- Zico (Part 1 only)

Directors:

- Pdogg
- Son Sung-deuk
- Wonderkid
- DOOBU

Guests:

- Hwang Kwang-hee (special host)
- Apink's Kim Nam-joo (special host)
- Momoland's JooE (special host)
- Kim Sung-eun (special host, episode 9)
- BTS (episodes 7 and 12)
- Bae Yoon-jung (episode 7)
- Seventeen's The8, Jun, Hoshi, Dino (episode 10)
- Shin A-young (co-host, finale)
- Tomorrow X Together (episode 12)
- Seventeen (episode 12, via AbemaTV Japan's I-Land K-pop Special)
- Eliminated contestants (episode 12)

== Contestants ==
Originally, there were a total of 23 contestants who participated in I-Land; however, as the show progressed, one contestant (Kim Yoon-won) voluntarily dropped out in the fifth episode of Part 1 due to a worsening ankle injury.

Color key:

| Final members of Enhypen |
| Eliminated in the final episode |
| Eliminated in Part 2 of I-Land |
| Eliminated in Part 1 of I-Land |
| Left the show |

23 contestants
| Yang Jung-won (양정원) | Jay (제이) | Jake (제이크) | Ni-Ki (니키) | Lee Hee-seung (이희승) | Park Sung-hoon (박성훈) |
| Kim Sunoo (김선우) | K (케이) | Daniel (다니엘) | Taki (타키) | Hanbin (한빈) | Lee Geon-u (이건우) |
| Nicholas (니콜라스) | EJ (변의주) | Chu Ji-min (추지민) | Noh Sung-chul (노성철) | Kim Tae-yong (김태용) | Jung Jae-beom (정재범) |
| Lee Young-bin (이영빈) | Jo Kyung-min (조경민) | Choi Jae-ho (최재호) | Choi Se-on (최세온) | Kim Yoon-won (김윤원) | |

== Profile ==
The ages of all contestants are presented in accordance with the international age system as of Episode 1 (June 26, 2020).

| Stage name (Birth name) | Hangul | Age | Nationality | Prior I-LAND |
|---|---|---|---|---|
| K | 케이 | 22 | Japan | Former marathon athlete; pre-debut Japan dance school and J-pop agency auditions |
| Hanbin (Ngô Ngọc Hưng) | 한빈 | 22 | Vietnam | Dance crew leader and founding member of C.A.C |
| Choi Se-on | 최세온 | 20 | South Korea | Former Yuehua Entertainment trainee; former Produce 101 Season 2 contestant under the name Choi Seung-hyuk |
| Lee Geon-u | 이건우 | 19 | South Korea | Former contestant on Dancing High |
| Choi Jae-ho | 최재호 | 19 | South Korea | Former n.CH Entertainment trainee and World Klass contestant |
| Jung Jae-beom | 정재범 | 19 | South Korea | Background in music composition |
| Chu Ji-min | 추지민 | 18 | South Korea | Song-writing |
| Lee Hee-seung | 이희승 | 18 | South Korea | Former Big Hit trainee |
| Lee Young-bin | 이영빈 | 18 | South Korea | Basketball player for seven years, former Starship trainee |
| Jay (Jay Park) | 제이 | 18 | South Korea; United States | Former Big Hit trainee and SM Entertainment trainee |
| Nicholas (Wang Yixiang) | 니콜라스 | 17 | Taiwan | B-boy, Taipei global audition |
| EJ (Byun Eui-joo) | 변의주 | 17 | South Korea | Former Big Hit trainee; competitive fencer in middle school |
| Jake (Jake Sim) | 제이크 | 17 | South Korea; Australia | Selected from Belift global auditions in Seoul |
| Park Sung-hoon | 박성훈 | 17 | South Korea | Former national youth figure skater; former Big Hit trainee since 2018 |
| Sunoo (Kim Seon-woo) | 김선우 | 17 | South Korea | Selected from Belift 2019 auditions in Seoul, former Kakao and SM trainee |
| Noh Sung-chul | 노성철 | 16 | South Korea | Soccer player, former Big Hit trainee |
| Yang Jung-won | 양정원 | 16 | South Korea | Former Big Hit trainee since October 2018; former SM trainee; competitive Taekwondo athlete for four years |
| Kim Tae-yong | 김태용 | 15 | South Korea | Child actor for eight years, former Big Hit trainee |
| Cho Kyung-min | 조경민 | 15 | South Korea | Contemporary dancer and former Big Hit trainee |
| Kim Yoon-won (Note: Yoonwon withdrew after part 1 of the show due to unforeseen circumstances.) | 김윤원 | 15 | South Korea | Member of K-pop dance crew Matchpoint Crew, part of The J Production |
| Taki | 타키 | 15 | Japan | Locking dance |
| Ni-Ki (Nishimura Riki) | 니키 | 14 | Japan | Extensive dance background since childhood |
| Daniel (Kim Dong-kyu) | 다니엘 | 14 | South Korea; United States | Selected from Belift 2019 auditions; former YG Entertainment trainee under the name Kim Dong-kyu |

== Missions ==
=== Part 1 ===
==== Entry Test ====
Trainees must perform a song either in the small groups in which they arrived or alone if they arrived as such. The contestants already present raise their hands to decide whether the new arrivals are worthy to be in the I-Land. If a trainee receives 12 or more votes, they are allowed to be on the I-Land; otherwise, they will be on the Ground. There is no limit to the number of times any one trainee could raise his hand. However, if more than 12 contestants were voted to the I-Land after the entry test is complete, they must choose one or more to be moved to the Ground until only 12 remain.

Color key

- I-Land
- Moved Out (Note: Contestant that joined I-Land but were voted to be moved out into the Ground in later episodes.)
- Ground

Entry Test (Episode 1)
| Order | Song | Original Artist | Trainee | Votes | Results |
|---|---|---|---|---|---|
| 1 | "Lullaby" | Got7 | Choi Se-on | 22/22 (100%) | I-Land |
| 2 | "The 7th Sense" | NCT U | Park Sung-hoon | 21/22 (95.5%) | I-Land |
| 2 | "The 7th Sense" | NCT U | Jay | 19/22 (86.4%) | I-Land |
| 3 | "Jopping" | SuperM | Nicholas | 12/22 (54.5%) | I-Land |
| 3 | "Jopping" | SuperM | Ni-Ki | 20/22 (90.9%) | I-Land |
| 3 | "Jopping" | SuperM | Hanbin | 7/22 (31.8%) | Ground |
| 4 | "Boss" | NCT U | Lee Hee-seung | 20/22 (90.9%) | I-Land |
| 5 | "Danger" | Taemin | K | 16/22 (72.7%) | I-Land |
| 6 | "Any Song" | Zico | Daniel | 17/22 (77.3%) | I-Land |
| 6 | "Any Song" | Zico | EJ | 12/22 (54.5%) | Moved Out |
| 7 | "Shoot Out" | Monsta X | Noh Sung-chul | 17/22 (77.3%) | Moved Out |
| 7 | "Shoot Out" | Monsta X | Jung Jae-beom | 8/22 (36.4%) | Ground |
| 7 | "Shoot Out" | Monsta X | Chu Ji-min | 7/22 (31.8%) | Ground |
| 8 | "Chained Up" | VIXX | Lee Geon-u | 19/22 (86.4%) | I-Land |
| 8 | "Chained Up" | VIXX | Cho Kyung-min | 11/22 (50.0%) | Ground |
| 8 | "Chained Up" | VIXX | Choi Jae-ho | 6/22 (27.3%) | Ground |
| 9 | "Monster" | EXO | Taki (Note: Including an appeal performance of the "Rocking" dance with "Funkastic James" by Common Ground.) | 22/22 (100%) | Moved Out |
| 10 | "All I Wanna Do (feat. Hoody & Loco)" (Korean version) | Jay Park | Kim Yoon-won (Note: Including an appeal performance of him singing "Don't Know You" by Heize.) | 9/22 (40.9%) | Ground |
| 10 | "All I Wanna Do (feat. Hoody & Loco)" (Korean version) | Jay Park | Kim Tae-yong | 9/22 (40.9%) | Ground |
| 10 | "All I Wanna Do (feat. Hoody & Loco)" (Korean version) | Jay Park | Yang Jung-won | 21/22 (95.5%) | I-Land |
| 11 | "Crown" | Tomorrow X Together | Kim Sunoo | 20/22 (90.9%) | Moved Out |
| 11 | "Crown" | Tomorrow X Together | Lee Young-bin | 12/22 (54.5%) | I-Land |
| 11 | "Crown" | Tomorrow X Together | Jake | 13/22 (59.1%) | I-Land |

==== Theme Song ====
The trainees, who are only just getting to know each other, begin their first official mission with the theme "encounter". The I-Landers and Grounders must perform the show's theme song "Into The I-LAND" (original version by IU). There are 12 parts in the song, and each trainee chooses which part they want to perform. The I-Landers are evaluated individually by the producers and directors, and the entire group's average score determines the number of contestants who move out of the I-Land. (Note: See System) The Grounders each submit a daily performance video to be reviewed by the producers and directors to determine who will replace the demoted I-Landers, although they do not actually perform on stage.

Lee Hee-seung is appointed as leader and assigned the part 1 position by the contestants but later gives up both to Ni-Ki. Rain evaluates their performance two days before their performance. The I-Landers receive an average score of 59 and therefore choose six contestants to be moved out of the I-Land.

Color key

- Contestant from the I-Land later moved to the Ground

Theme Song (Episode 2 & 3)
| Part | Trainee |
|---|---|
| 1 (Center) | Ni-Ki (Note: Originally Lee Hee-seung has this part, but switched parts with Ni-ki.) |
| 2 | Lee Geon-u |
| 3 | Yang Jung-won |
| 4 | K |
| 5 | Choi Se-on |
| 6 | Daniel |
| 7 | Park Sung-hoon |
| 8 | Jay |
| 9 | Nicholas |
| 10 | Lee Hee-seung (Note: Originally Ni-ki has this part, but switched parts with Lee Hee-seung.) |
| 11 | Jake (Note: A technical difficulty with the mic caused Jake's part to be silent.) |
| 12 | Lee Young-bin |

==== Teamwork ====
The trainees' second mission is designed to test and develop their teamwork. Both the I-Landers and the Grounders must perform a remix of "Fire" by BTS, and are given six days to prepare. The scoring system from the theme song mission will be used; however, the highest individual scoring I-Lander is given a dropout exemption card, which can be used on any of the I-Landers, including himself. If the card is used, the next dropout candidate will automatically be demoted to the Ground. If there are no dropouts from I-Land in this round, the Grounders will not be able to perform at all.

Jay and Ni-Ki become the leaders of the Grounders, while Lee Hee-seung is the leader of the I-Landers. Two days before the test, Rain and DOOBU evaluate the Grounders, and Zico, Pdogg and Son Sung-deuk evaluate the I-Landers as a midpoint check. The I-Landers receive a teamwork score of 80 and an average score of 78 and therefore choose four contestants to be moved out from the I-Land. Having received the highest individual score, K uses his dropout exemption card to save Yang Jung-won, and Taki moves to the Ground instead. Both received five votes; however, Taki's higher individual score initially saved him from being dropped.

- Contestant from I-Land that received the highest score thus received the dropout exemption card
- Contestant that eventually stays in I-Land
- Contestant that later moved from I-Land to Ground
- Contestant that later moved from Ground to I-Land
- Contestant that eventually stays in Ground

Teamwork (Episode 3 & 4)
| Part | I-LAND | Ground |
|---|---|---|
| 1 (Center) | Lee Hee-seung | Jay |
| 2 | K | Ni-Ki |
| 3 | Yang Jung-won (Note: Originally Yang Jung-won was eliminated, however K used his dropout exemption card to save him.) | Daniel |
| 4 | Lee Geon-u | Hanbin |
| 5 | Jung Jae-beom | Jake |
| 6 | Kim Sunoo | Noh Sung-chul |
| 7 | Choi Se-on | Choi Jae-ho |
| 8 | Kim Tae-yong | Nicholas |
| 9 | Park Sung-hoon | Jo Kyung-min |
| 10 | Kim Yoon-won | Chu Ji-Min |
| 11 | EJ | Lee Young-bin |
| 12 | Taki (Note: Originally Ta-ki remained in I-Land, however K used his dropout exemption card to save Yang Jung-won, thus he got eliminated.) | |

==== Representative Unit ====
The trainees' third mission involves picking representatives for vocal and dance battles between the I-Landers and Grounders to test their sacrifice and ability to directly compete. If the Grounders win, six contestants will be dropped from the I-Land. If I-Landers win, no contestants will be dropped. The trainees are given six days to prepare.

Rain and Son Sung-deuk evaluate the I-Landers, and Zico, Pdogg, and DOOBU evaluate the Grounders as a midpoint check, three days before the test. The I-Landers won the battle; therefore, no I-Landers were moved to the Ground.

- Win
- Lose

Representative Unit (Episode 4 & 5)
| Vocal | I-Land (Song: "Butterfly" by BTS) | | Ground (Song: "Save Me" by BTS) | |
|---|---|---|---|---|
| Vocal | Lee Geon-u | Score: 81 | Kim Sunoo | Score: 74 |
| Vocal | Lee Hee-seung | Score: 81 | Daniel (Note: Originally Noh Sung-chul has this part, but switched parts with Daniel.) | Score: 74 |
| Dance | I-Land (Songs: "Rainism" by Rain, "3 Dope Boyz" by Dynamic Duo & "One of a Kind" by G-Dragon) | | Ground (Songs: "Warrior's Descendant" by H.O.T., "Reversal" by X-Teen & "One of a Kind" by G-Dragon) | |
| Dance | Park Sung-hoon (Note: Originally Jay has this part, but switched parts with Park Sung-hoon.) | Score: 73 | Ni-Ki | Score: 65 |
| Dance | Yang Jung-won | Score: 73 | Nicholas | Score: 65 |
| Dance | K | Score: 73 | Choi Jae-ho (Note: Hanbin got a chance to do this part but eventually Choi Jae-ho got the part) | Score: 65 |
| I-Land Total Score | | 154 | Ground Total Score | 139 |

==== The Final 12 ====
The fourth and last mission of the first part of the show decides the final 12 contestants. The trainees must perform an original song titled "I&credible" with the theme "Awakening". Similar to "Into the I-LAND", there are 12 parts, and each trainee must choose which part they want to perform. They are given seven days to prepare.

Rain and Son Sung-deuk evaluate the Grounders, and Zico, Pdogg, and DOOBU evaluate the I-Landers as a midpoint check. Jay and Jake help the I-Landers with the details of the choreography, and Ni-Ki helps the Grounders. From the I-Land, three contestants are voted out by the I-Landers themselves, and another three from the producers. Six trainees from the Ground, including the demoted I-Landers, are selected to fill the six remaining spots in the I-Land by the global fans through voting. The six remaining I-Landers automatically advance to the second part of the show. After the eliminated I-Landers arrive on the Ground, they must perform again with the Grounders, and they are given three days to redistribute parts and prepare.

I-Landers K, Lee Hee-seung, Park Sung-hoon, Yang Jung-won, Jake, and Jay were saved from being dropped to the Ground and therefore will continue on the second part of the show.

Contestants that later moved from I-Land to Ground

The Final 12 (Episode 5 & 6)
| Part | I-LAND | Ground |
|---|---|---|
| 1 (Center) | K | Lee Geon-u |
| 2 | Yang Jung-won (Note: Originally Lee Hee-seung has this part, but switched parts with Yang Jung-won.) | Choi Jae-ho |
| 3 | Park Sung-hoon | Chu Ji-min |
| 4 | Lee Geon-u | Noh Sung-chul |
| 5 | Lee Hee-seung (Note: Originally Yang Jung-won has this part, but switched parts with Lee Hee-seung.) | Ni-Ki |
| 6 | Jay | Hanbin |
| 7 | Choi Se-on | Choi Se-on |
| 8 | Jake | Jung Jae-beom |
| 9 | EJ | Taki |
| 10 | Jung Jae-beom | Jo Kyung-min |
| 11 | Lee Young-bin | Lee Young-bin |
| 12 | Jo Kyung-min | Kim Tae-yong |
| 13 | | Nicholas |
| 14 | | EJ |
| 15 | | Daniel |
| 16 | | Kim Sunoo |

- Kim Yoon-won withdrew from I-Land due to a worsening leg injury.

=== Part 2 ===
==== BTS Test ====
The first test of the second part of I-Land and the final 12 contestants is performing songs by BTS. The 12 contestants are divided into three units, with each one performing a different song. BTS announced the mission themselves in a message recorded from the living room of the I-Land complex while the contestants watch from the lobby. The producers choose a contestant who will be eliminated based on individual scoring. The unit with the highest team score will be exempted from elimination; if the contestant with the lowest individual score is in the winning unit, the trainee with the next-lowest score will be eliminated. They are given seven days to prepare. Son Sung-deuk and DOOBU evaluate the I-Landers as a midpoint check.

Choreographers Bae Yoon Jung and Son Sung-deuk give a mini-mission, a freestyle dance battle, with those ranking first through third serving as leaders of each unit and choosing either their unit lineup or song.

The "Fake Love" unit ranks first. Taki receives the lowest individual score but is saved from being eliminated as he is a member of the winning unit. Lee Geon-u, who places 11th, is eliminated instead. The contestants placing first through third based on individual scores earn the opportunity to spend one day of outside of the I-Land.

BTS Test Mini-Mission: Freestyle Dance Battle
| Rank | Contestant |
|---|---|
| 1 | Taki |
| 2 | K |
| 3 | Yang Jung-won |

- Unit with the highest score and is exempted from elimination
- Unit with the lowest score
- Contestant that was eliminated
- Contestant that was originally eliminated but was saved by the winning unit's exemption card

BTS Test (Episode 7 & 8)
| Song | Contestants | Individual Score | Team Score | Rank |
|---|---|---|---|---|
| "Fake Love" | Taki | 57 | 306 | 1st |
| "Fake Love" | Park Sung-hoon | 79 | 306 | 1st |
| "Fake Love" | Lee Hee-seung | 93 | 306 | 1st |
| "Fake Love" | Kim Sunoo | 77 | 306 | 1st |
| "DNA" | K | 78 | 287 | 2nd |
| "DNA" | Hanbin | 66 | 287 | 2nd |
| "DNA" | Jay | 74 | 287 | 2nd |
| "DNA" | Ni-Ki | 69 | 287 | 2nd |
| "I Need U" | Yang Jung-won | 81 | 275 | 3rd |
| "I Need U" | Lee Geon-u | 60 | 275 | 3rd |
| "I Need U" | Jake | 70 | 275 | 3rd |
| "I Need U" | Daniel | 64 | 275 | 3rd |

==== Chemistry Test ====
The second test of the second part of the show is about the chemistry between the contestants and global fans. The contestants are divided into two units and must perform two new singles: "Flicker" and "Dive Into You", the former later being released as a part of ENHYPEN's first EP "BORDER: DAY ONE". The eliminations for this round will be determined by global votes. The contestant who is chosen by the producers as first place will have their votes in the 24 hours before global voting ends doubled.

Lee Hee-seung, the first-place contestant, selects his song and unit lineup. Each unit has six days to prepare. Son Sung-deuk and DOOBU evaluate the units' performances, while vocal coach Kim Sung-eun evaluates the vocal performances of the I-Landers as a midpoint check. Jake was the I-Lander picked by the producers.

- First place contestant picked by the producers
- Contestant that was eliminated

Chemistry Test (Episode 9 & 10)
| Part | "Flicker" | "Dive Into You" |
|---|---|---|
| 1 | Lee Hee-seung | Jay |
| 2 | K | Kim Sunoo |
| 3 | Yang Jung-won | Hanbin |
| 4 | Jake | Ni-Ki |
| 5 | Park Sung-hoon | Taki |
| 6 | | Daniel |

==== Concept Test ====
The third test of the second part of the show is about concept performance and features a mini-mission to form teams. The trainees cover two songs by Seventeen, "Pretty U" and "Hit". They are given one day to practice. The8, Jun, Dino and Hoshi of Seventeen visit the I-Land to administer the mini-mission themselves, which was won by Team "Pretty U". Kim Sunoo places first and selects his song and lineup for the main mission. The contestants are divided into two units to perform new singles: "Chamber 5 (Dream of Dreams)" as a refreshing concept and "Flame On" as an explosion concept. The producers then choose the contestant who will be eliminated based on individual scoring.

Park Sung-hoon and Kim Sunoo were appointed as team leaders. Taki, who placed 11th in global votes for the previous Chemistry Test, is eliminated. Kim Sun-oo replaces Taki with Park Sung-hoon, and K replaces Park Sung-hoon as leader of "Flame On". Both units have five days to practice, and Son Sung-deuk evaluates them as a midpoint check.

K places first in the main part of the Concept Test, and Hanbin is eliminated by virtue of placing tenth.

- First place team (chosen by Seventeen)
- First place contestant

Seventeen Cover Song Mini-Mission
| "Pretty U" | "Hit" |
|---|---|
| Park Sung-hoon | Jay |
| Kim Sunoo | K |
| Yang Jung-won | Hanbin |
| Jake | Ni-Ki |
| Taki (Note: Taki was eliminated after the announcement of the global votes that took place after the mini mission.) | Lee Hee-seung |
| Daniel | |

- First place contestant
- Contestant that was eliminated

Concept Test (Episode 11)
| Part | "Chamber 5 (Dream of Dreams)" | "Flame On" |
|---|---|---|
| 1 | Lee Hee-seung | K |
| 2 | Kim Sunoo | Hanbin |
| 3 | Yang Jung-won | Daniel |
| 4 | Jake | Ni-Ki |
| 5 | Park Sung-hoon | Jay |

==== Final Test ====
The last test of the show will determine the lineup of the debut group, which will have seven members. The top six trainees will be selected from global votes, while one trainee will be chosen by the producers. The trainees perform a new single titled "Calling (Run Into You)" during the live broadcast. Son Sung-deuk and DOOBU evaluate the I-Landers as a midpoint check. The I-Landers will also get to film their own PR video, the duration of which is based on their ranking; trainees placed first, second, and third will have 60, 50, and 40 seconds, respectively) and the remaining will have 30 seconds.

The 13 previously-eliminated trainees return to the I-Land and reunite with the current contestants to practice their first song, "Into The I-LAND", together and perform it on live broadcast for the first time.

The debut group name is revealed as "Enhypen", derived from the hyphen (-) symbol, which implies connection, discovery, and growth. The final lineup consists of Yang Jung-won, Jay, Jake, Niki, Lee Hee-seung, Park Sung-hoon, with Kim Sun-oo as the producer's pick.

- Debuting contestants voted by global fans
- Contestant that was picked by the producers to be in the debut lineup
- Contestants that were eliminated

Final Test (Episode 12)
| Part | Contestant |
|---|---|
| 1 | Lee Hee-seung |
| 2 | K |
| 3 | Yang Jung-won |
| 4 | Kim Sun-oo |
| 5 | Park Sung-hoon |
| 6 | Ni-Ki |
| 7 | Jay |
| 8 | Jake |
| 9 | Daniel |

== Results ==
Color key:

| Contestants moved to "I-Land" |
| Contestants moved to "Ground" |
| Eliminated from the show |
| Ranking for a temporary debut lineup |

=== Part 1 ===
| Episode 1 (June 26, 2020) | | Episode 2 (July 3, 2020) | | Episode 3 (July 10, 2020) | | Episode 4 (July 17, 2020) | | Episode 5 (July 24, 2020) | | Episode 6 (July 31, 2020) | | Episode 7 (August 14, 2020) | |
| I-Land | Ground | I-Land | Ground | I-Land | Ground | I-Land | Ground | I-Land | Ground | I-Land | Ground | Final 12 | Eliminated |
|---|---|---|---|---|---|---|---|---|---|---|---|---|---|
| K | Hanbin | K | Hanbin | K | Hanbin | K | Hanbin | K | Hanbin | K | Hanbin | K | Jo Kyung-min |
| Choi Se-on | Jung Jae-beom | Choi Se-on | Jung Jae-beom | Choi Se-on | Chu Ji-min | Choi Se-on | Chu Ji-min | Choi Se-on | Chu Ji-min | Lee Hee-seung | Chu Ji-min | Lee Hee-seung | Jung Jae-beom |
| Lee Geon-u | Chu Ji-min | Lee Geon-u | Chu Ji-min | Lee Geon-u | Jo Kyung-min | Lee Geon-u | Ni-Ki | Lee Geon-u | Ni-Ki | Park Sung-hoon | Ni-Ki | Park Sung-hoon | Chu Ji-min |
| Lee Hee-seung | Jo Kyung-min | Lee Hee-seung | Jo Kyung-min | Lee Hee-seung | Choi Jae-ho | Lee Hee-seung | Choi Jae-ho | Lee Hee-seung | Choi Jae-ho | Yang Jung-won | Choi Jae-ho | Yang Jung-won | Noh Sung-chul |
| Lee Young-bin | Choi Jae-ho | Lee Young-bin | Choi Jae-ho | Park Sung-hoon | Noh Sung-chul | Park Sung-hoon | Noh Sung-chul | Park Sung-hoon | Noh Sung-chul | Jake | Noh Sung-chul | Jake | Choi Jae-ho |
| Jay | Kim Yoon-won | Jay | Kim Yoon-won | Yang Jung-won | Lee Young-bin | Jung Jae-beom | Daniel | Jung Jae-beom | Daniel | Jay | Daniel | Jay | Kim Tae-yong |
| Nicholas | Kim Tae-yong | Nicholas | Kim Tae-yong | Kim Tae-yong | Daniel | EJ | Nicholas | EJ | Nicholas | | Nicholas | Kim Sun-oo (Note: 1st place with 2,648,265 votes) | EJ |
| EJ | | Daniel | Taki | Jung Jae-beom | Jake | Yang Jung-won | Kim Yoon-won | Yang Jung-Won | Kim Yoon-won | | Kim Tae-yong | Daniel (Note: 2nd place with 2,532,915 votes) | Nicholas |
| Jake | | Jake | Kim Sun-oo | EJ | Jay | Jo Kyung-min | Kim Tae-yong | Jo Kyung-min | Kim Tae-yong | | Kim Sun-oo | Ni-Ki (Note: 3rd place with 2,090,201 votes) | Lee Young-bin |
| Park Sung-hoon | | Park Sung-hoon | Noh Sung-chul | Kim Yoon-won | Nicholas | Lee Young-bin | Kim Sun-oo | Lee Young-bin | Kim Sun-oo | | Taki | Lee Geon-u (Note: 4th place with 1,916,736 votes) | Choi Se-on |
| Kim Sun-oo | | Yang Jung-won | EJ | Kim Sun-oo | Ni-Ki | Jake | Taki | Jake | Taki | | Lee Young-bin | Taki (Note: 5th place with 1,703,579 votes) | |
| Noh Sung-chul | | Ni-Ki | | Taki | | Jay | | Jay | | | Jo Kyung-min | Hanbin (Note: 6th place with 1,094,601 votes) | |
| Yang Jung-won | | | | | | | | | | | Jung Jae-beom | | |
| Taki | | | | | | | | | | | EJ | | |
| Ni-Ki | | | | | | | | | | | Choi Se-on | | |
| Daniel | | | | | | | | | | | Lee Geon-u | | |

=== Part 2 ===
| Rank | Episode 7 (August 14, 2020) | Episode 8 (August 21, 2020) | Episode 10 (September 4, 2020) | Episode 11 (September 11, 2020) | Episode 12 (September 18, 2020) |
| Rank | Final 12 | Final 11 | Final 10 | Final 9 | Enhypen |
|---|---|---|---|---|---|
| 1 | Kim Sunoo | Lee Hee-seung (↑2) | Kim Sun-oo (↑4) | K (↑5) | Yang Jung-won (↑8) |
| 2 | Daniel | Yang Jung-won (↑5) | Lee Hee-seung (↓1) | Ni-Ki (↑7) | Jay (↑4) |
| 3 | Lee Hee-seung | Park Sung-hoon (↑1) | Jay (↑3) | Kim Sun-oo (↓2) | Jake (↑4) |
| 4 | Park Sung-hoon | K (↑1) | Hanbin (↑5) | Lee Hee-seung (↓2) | Ni-Ki (↓2) |
| 5 | K | Kim Sun-oo (↓4) | Park Sung-hoon (↓2) | Park Sung-hoon (–) | Lee Hee-seung (↓1) |
| 6 | Jay | Jay (–) | K (↓2) | Jay (↓3) | Park Sung-hoon (↓1) |
| 7 | Yang Jung-won | Jake (↑1) | Jake (–) | Jake (–) | Kim Sun-oo (Note: Producers' Pick, 8th Place by Global Voting) (↓4) |
| 8 | Jake | Ni-Ki (↑1) | Yang Jung-won (↓6) | Daniel (↑2) | K (Note: 7th Place by Global Voting) (↓7) |
| 9 | Ni-Ki | Hanbin (↑3) | Ni-Ki (↓1) | Yang Jung-won (↓1) | Daniel (↓1) |
| 10 | Taki | Daniel (↓8) | Daniel (–) | Hanbin (↓6) | |
| 11 | Lee Geon-u | Lee Geon-u (Note: 11th place Lee Geon-u was eliminated instead since 12th place Taki was in the winning group units, thus he is exempted) (–) | Taki (↑1) | | |
| 12 | Hanbin | Taki (Note: 12th place Taki was in the winning group units, thus he is exempted, while 11th place Lee Geon-u replacing him to be eliminated) (↓2) | | | |

== Discography ==
=== Singles ===
| Title | Year | Peak positions | Album |
| Title | Year | KOR | Album |
|---|---|---|---|
| "Into the I-Land" | 2020 | 3 | I-LAND Part.1 Signal Song |
| "I&credible" | 2020 | — | I-LAND Part.1 Final Song |
| "Flicker" | 2020 | — | Non-album singles |
| "Dive into You" | 2020 | — | Non-album singles |
| "Chamber 5 (Dream of Dreams)" | 2020 | — | Non-album singles |
| "Flame On" | 2020 | — | Non-album singles |
| "Calling (Run To You)" | 2020 | — | I-LAND Part.2 Final Song |

== System ==
=== Part 1 ===
A scoring system was introduced in Episode 2. Each I-Lander is evaluated individually and scored from 0 to 100. These scores are displayed anonymously, so any particular individual's score is unknown, and then averaged to calculate the team score. Based on the team score, a certain number of I-Landers be moved to the Ground and replaced.

In Episode 3, a separate "teamwork" score was also given and factored into the overall average score.

Team score system
| Average team score | Number of I-Landers dropped |
|---|---|
| 96-100 | 0 |
| 91-95 | 1 |
| 86-90 | 2 |
| 81-85 | 3 |
| 76-80 | 4 |
| 71-75 | 5 |
| 70 and below | 6 |

==== Global voting ====
A global voting system opened after Episode 5 on July 24, 2020 at 12:00 a.m. KST and ended on August 2, 2020 at 12:00 a.m. KST. Viewers vote once per day for six contestants out of the total 23 that they wish to see progress to the second part of I-Land.

The second global vote started on August 1, 2020 at 12:00 a.m. KST, after Episode 6, and ended on August 2, 2020 at 12:00 p.m. KST. Viewers vote for six contestants out of the 16 Grounders, excluding the top six I-Landers, that they wish to see progress to the second part of I-Land. Every vote is multiplied by three.

| Top 6 Voted in (Note: The "Top 6 Voted in" are those voted in from 16 trainees in GROUND to continue with the top 6 trainees who were safe from Part 1.) | | | Top 12 global votes (Note: The "Top 12 global votes" was explained as the results of the votes that were conducted for a week including all 23 trainees from Part 1.) | | |
| Rank | Contestant | Votes | Rank | Contestant | Votes |
|---|---|---|---|---|---|
| 1 | Kim Sun-oo | 2,648,265 | 1 | Kim Sun-oo | 1,087,503 |
| 2 | Daniel | 2,532,915 | 2 | Daniel | 1,021,269 |
| 3 | Ni-Ki | 2,090,201 | 3 | Lee Hee-seung | 1,006,965 |
| 4 | Lee Geon-u | 1,916,736 | 4 | Park Sung-hoon | 960,658 |
| 5 | Taki | 1,703,579 | 5 | K | 845,204 |
| 6 | Hanbin | 1,094,601 | 6 | Jay | 841,599 |
| | | | 7 | Yang Jung-won | 814,041 |
| | | | 8 | Jake | 812,591 |
| | | | 9 | Ni-Ki | 778,757 |
| | | | 10 | Taki | 656,135 |
| | | | 11 | Lee Geon-u | 644,331 |
| | | | 12 | Hanbin | 376,509 |

=== Part 2 ===
The new system was introduced in Episode 7. Each I-Lander is evaluated individually and ranked from one to 12. The top seven I-Landers will wear a badge symbolizing the debut group, and the ranks can change after each skill test. Identical to Part 1, there are four tests; on each test, one or more contestants will be eliminated according to their ranks. In Test 1 and Test 3, eliminated contestants are selected by producers only, while in Test 2 and the Final Test, global votes from viewers will be added to determine the eliminated contestants and final debut lineup.

==== Global voting ====
Another global voting system was introduced to select the seven debuting members. For the first part of voting, each viewer can vote up to two contestants per day from August 15, 2020 12:00 a.m. KST to August 29, 2020 11:59 p.m. KST. Votes for contestants who were eliminated during the voting period are disregarded.

The second part of voting started on September 5, 2020 and ended before the final episode on September 18, 2020. Viewers can select only one contestant per day. Votes for contestants who were eliminated during the voting period are disregarded.

Another voting period occurred during the live broadcast of the show's finale. Viewers can select only one contestant, and voting is only open for an hour.

| Rank | Top 11 partial results (August 15–21, 2020) | Top 11 final results (August 15–29, 2020) (Note: Used for Chemistry Test eliminations) | | Top 9 final results (September 4–18, 2020) (Note: Used for Final Test eliminations) | |
| Rank | Contestant | Contestant | Votes | Contestant | Votes |
|---|---|---|---|---|---|
| 1 | Kim Sun-oo | Kim Sun-oo | 1,705,287 | Yang Jung-won | 1,417,620 |
| 2 | Lee Hee-seung | Lee Hee-seung | 1,592,834 | Jay | 1,192,889 |
| 3 | Park Sung-hoon | Jay | 1,535,928 | Jake | 1,179,633 |
| 4 | Taki | Han-bin | 1,415,420 | Ni-Ki | 1,140,728 |
| 5 | Jake | Park Sung-hoon | 1,298,204 | Lee Hee-seung | 1,137,323 |
| 6 | Yang Jung-won | K | 1,182,411 | Park Sung-hoon | 1,088,413 |
| 7 | Daniel | Jake (Note: Jake received a first rank benefit which is doubling every vote he'll receive during the last 24 hours of voting.) | 1,151,132 | K | 946,046 |
| 8 | Han-bin | Yang Jung-won | 1,083,305 | Kim Sun-oo | 935,771 |
| 9 | K | Ni-Ki | 892,664 | Daniel | 773,792 |
| 10 | Ni-Ki | Daniel | 828,473 | | |
| 11 | Jay | Taki | 762,679 | | |

=== I-Land score results ===
Color key

- Highest score that round
- Lowest score that round

| Theme Song mission | | | Team Work mission | | | | Representative Unit mission | The Final 12 mission | | | BTS Test | | Chemistry Test | Concept Test | | Final Test |
|---|---|---|---|---|---|---|---|---|---|---|---|---|---|---|---|---|
| Contestant | Individual Scores | Average Score | Contestant | Individual Scores | Teamwork Score | Average Score | Team Score | Contestant | Individual Scores | Team Score | Contestant | Individual Scores | Global Votes | Contestant | Individual Scores | Global Votes + Producer's Pick |
| Youngbin | 47 | 59 | - | 68 | 80 | 78 | (Representatives: Heeseung & Geonu) Vocal: 81 (Representatives: Jungwon, Sunghoon & K) Dance: 73 Total: 154 | Youngbin | 65 | 69 | Sun-oo | 77 | Global Votes | Sun-oo | 86 | Global Votes + Producer's Pick |
| Daniel | 70 | 59 | - | 69 | 80 | 78 | (Representatives: Heeseung & Geonu) Vocal: 81 (Representatives: Jungwon, Sunghoon & K) Dance: 73 Total: 154 | Kyung-min | 64 | 69 | Daniel | 64 | Global Votes | Heeseung | 83 | Global Votes + Producer's Pick |
| Jake | 40 | 59 | Taki | 75 | 80 | 78 | (Representatives: Heeseung & Geonu) Vocal: 81 (Representatives: Jungwon, Sunghoon & K) Dance: 73 Total: 154 | Jake | 75 | 69 | Heeseung | 93 | Global Votes | Jay | 79 | Global Votes + Producer's Pick |
| - | 67 | 59 | - | 66 | 80 | 78 | (Representatives: Heeseung & Geonu) Vocal: 81 (Representatives: Jungwon, Sunghoon & K) Dance: 73 Total: 154 | Seon | 65 | 69 | Sunghoon | 79 | Global Votes | Hanbin | 72 | Global Votes + Producer's Pick |
| - | 66 | 59 | Heeseung | 83 | 80 | 78 | (Representatives: Heeseung & Geonu) Vocal: 81 (Representatives: Jungwon, Sunghoon & K) Dance: 73 Total: 154 | Heeseung | 70 | 69 | K | 78 | Global Votes | Sunghoon | 81 | Global Votes + Producer's Pick |
| - | 61 | 59 | K | 88 | 80 | 78 | (Representatives: Heeseung & Geonu) Vocal: 81 (Representatives: Jungwon, Sunghoon & K) Dance: 73 Total: 154 | K | 61 | 69 | Jay | 74 | Global Votes | K | 92 | Global Votes + Producer's Pick |
| Nicholas | 46 | 59 | - | 67 | 80 | 78 | (Representatives: Heeseung & Geonu) Vocal: 81 (Representatives: Jungwon, Sunghoon & K) Dance: 73 Total: 154 | Jaebeom | 63 | 69 | Jungwon | 81 | Global Votes | Jake | 78 | Global Votes + Producer's Pick |
| Jungwon | 75 | 59 | - | 65 | 80 | 78 | (Representatives: Heeseung & Geonu) Vocal: 81 (Representatives: Jungwon, Sunghoon & K) Dance: 73 Total: 154 | Jungwon | 83 | 69 | Jake | 70 | Global Votes | Jungwon | 76 | Global Votes + Producer's Pick |
| - | 59 | 59 | EJ | 70 | 80 | 78 | (Representatives: Heeseung & Geonu) Vocal: 81 (Representatives: Jungwon, Sunghoon & K) Dance: 73 Total: 154 | Jay | 76 | 69 | Ni-Ki | 69 | Global Votes | Ni-Ki | 87 | Global Votes + Producer's Pick |
| - | 58 | 59 | - | 62 | 80 | 78 | (Representatives: Heeseung & Geonu) Vocal: 81 (Representatives: Jungwon, Sunghoon & K) Dance: 73 Total: 154 | Geonu | 60 | 69 | Taki | 57 | Global Votes | Daniel | 77 | Global Votes + Producer's Pick |
| - | 57 | 59 | Sunghoon | 80 | 80 | 78 | (Representatives: Heeseung & Geonu) Vocal: 81 (Representatives: Jungwon, Sunghoon & K) Dance: 73 Total: 154 | Sunghoon | 81 | 69 | Geonu | 60 | Global Votes | | | Global Votes + Producer's Pick |
| Ni-Ki | 65 | 59 | Sun-oo | 71 | 80 | 78 | (Representatives: Heeseung & Geonu) Vocal: 81 (Representatives: Jungwon, Sunghoon & K) Dance: 73 Total: 154 | EJ | 66 | 69 | Hanbin | 66 | Global Votes | | | Global Votes + Producer's Pick |

== Rating ==
In the ratings below, the highest rating for the show is in red and the lowest in blue. Some ratings have already been rounded off to one decimal place, as they are usually of lower ranks. Despite low domestic TV ratings, the international simulcast on online video platforms generated an accumulated 13.6 million views per episode.

| Episode | Air date | Nielsen Korea Ratings | | |
| Episode | Air date | Mnet | tvN | Sum |
|---|---|---|---|---|
| 1 | June 26, 2020 | 0.4% | 1.3% | 1.7% |
| 2 | July 3, 2020 | 0.3% | 0.6% | 0.9% |
| 3 | July 10, 2020 | 0.3% | 0.7% | 1.0% |
| 4 | July 17, 2020 | 0.3% | 0.4% | 0.7% |
| 5 | July 24, 2020 | 0.4% | 0.4% | 0.8% |
| 6 | July 31, 2020 | 0.4% | 0.3% | 0.7% |
| Special (Note: Aired only on Mnet) | August 7, 2020 | NR | N/A | N/A |
| 7 | August 14, 2020 | 0.6% | 0.4% | 1.0% |
| 8 | August 21, 2020 | 0.4% | 0.4% | 0.8% |
| 9 | August 28, 2020 | 0.5% | 0.3% | 0.8% |
| 10 | September 4, 2020 | 0.5% | 0.4% | 0.9% |
| 11 | September 11, 2020 | 0.5% | 0.3% | 0.8% |
| 12 (Note: Live only on Mnet) | September 18, 2020 | 0.8% | N/A | N/A |

- This show airs on a cable channel/pay TV which normally has a relatively smaller audience compared to free-to-air TV/public broadcasters.
- NR rating means "not reported".

== Controversies ==
- June 2020 : During shooting, the staff fell on the stage, and one of the performers had an arm fracture.
- On August 12, 2020, a staff of the cleaning service company of I-Land contracted COVID-19. Mnet cancelled all production and schedules of the show indefinitely while contestants and staff were tested for the virus. Filming resumed on August 17, 2020, after the production set was disinfected over the weekend; by then, most staff and all contestants tested negative for the virus, while other staff members were still waiting for their results.
- I-LAND raised many ethical questions surrounding the hidden cameras constantly filming the trainees throughout the show. Cameras were hidden behind two-way mirrors, in bathrooms, and in dorms. Trainees were often seen changing behind doors to avoid cameras or looking inside walls or mirrors for cameras. Ex-contestants of the show expressed trauma from hidden cameras after the show.

== Aftermath ==
- Enhypen debuted on November 30, 2020 with the extended play Border: Day One.
- Belift Lab created two spin-offs of the show, "Summer Training Camp" and "TMI Q&A", featuring all 22 contestants. The first spin-off premiered on September 25, 2020 on Hybe Labels' YouTube channel, and the second was uploaded on September 28, 2020.
- On January 1, 2021, Bighit Labels, now known as Hybe Labels announced that they would launch the "Bighit Japan Global Debut Project" to search for artists to debut as a group in Japan. Former I-Land contestants K, Nicholas, EJ and Taki were confirmed as members of the new group, and participated in survival show &Audition – The Howling to determine its additional members in 2022. After Hybe's rebranding, the project was called Hybe Japan Project.
- Hybe's Belift Lab partnered with JTBC to create the girl-group survival show R U Next?, which premiered on June 30, 2023.
- Lee-Heeseung (under name Evan) parted ways with Enhypen on March 10, 2026, the group continues as a six-member group via Bloody Paradise.
Other contestants
- Some trainees joined new agencies:
  - Hanbin joined Yuehua Entertainment.
  - Lee Geon-u and Chu Ji-min joined Bluedot Entertainment.
  - Lee Young-bin joined Keystone Entertainment.
  - Noh Sung-chul joined Fantagio.
  - K, EJ, Taki, Nicholas and Jo Kyung-min joined Hybe Labels Japan. However, on May 31, 2021, it was announced that Kyung-min had left Hybe Labels Japan due to differences in the direction of the debut project.
  - Jung Jae-beom joined Hyple Entertainment.
  - Cho Kyung-min joined MNH Entertainment.
  - Daniel joined NAISU Agency under the name of kyu.
- Some trainees debuted in new groups:
  - Lee Geon-u and Chu Ji-min (JM) debuted as members of boy group Just B on June 30, 2021 under Bluedot Entertainment.
  - Hanbin debuted as a member of boy group Tempest on March 2, 2022 under Yuehua Entertainment, But disbanded on October 20, 2026.
  - Lee Young-bin debuted as a member of boy group Blank2y on May 24, 2022 under Keystone Entertainment. But Disbanded on July 27, 2023.
  - K, EJ, Taki, and Nicholas debuted as members of boy group &Team on December 7, 2022 under Hybe Labels Japan.
  - Cho Kyung-min debuted as a member of boy group 8Turn on January 30, 2023 under MNH Entertainment.
  - Noh Sung-chul debuted as a member of boy group Lun8 on June 15, 2023 under Fantagio, with the stage name Ian.
- Some trainees opened social media accounts:
  - Choi Se-on opened a personal Instagram account.
  - Lee Geon-u opened a personal Twitter account.
  - Choi Jae-ho opened a personal Instagram account.
  - Jung Jae-beom changed his legal and stage name to Jeong E-chan and opened an Instagram account. He is currently part of the music production team Youth.
  - Kim Tae-yong opened a now-deleted personal Instagram account.
  - Lee Young-bin opened a now-deleted personal Instagram account.
  - Cho Kyung-min opened a now-inactive personal Instagram account.
  - Kim Daniel opened a personal Instagram account.
- Some trainees joined survival shows:
  - Jung Jae-beom joined Mnet's Boys Planet under the name Jeong Ichan.
- Some trainees left their groups:
  - Lee Young-bin departed from Blank2y on February 25, 2023.
- Kim Yoon-won returned to the K-pop dance crew Matchpoint Crew.

== Awards and nominations ==
| Year | Award | Category | Result | Ref. |
|---|---|---|---|---|
| 2021 | International Emmy Awards | Best Non-scripted Entertainment | Nominated | |
