= Ni-Ki =

Japanese singer (born 2005)

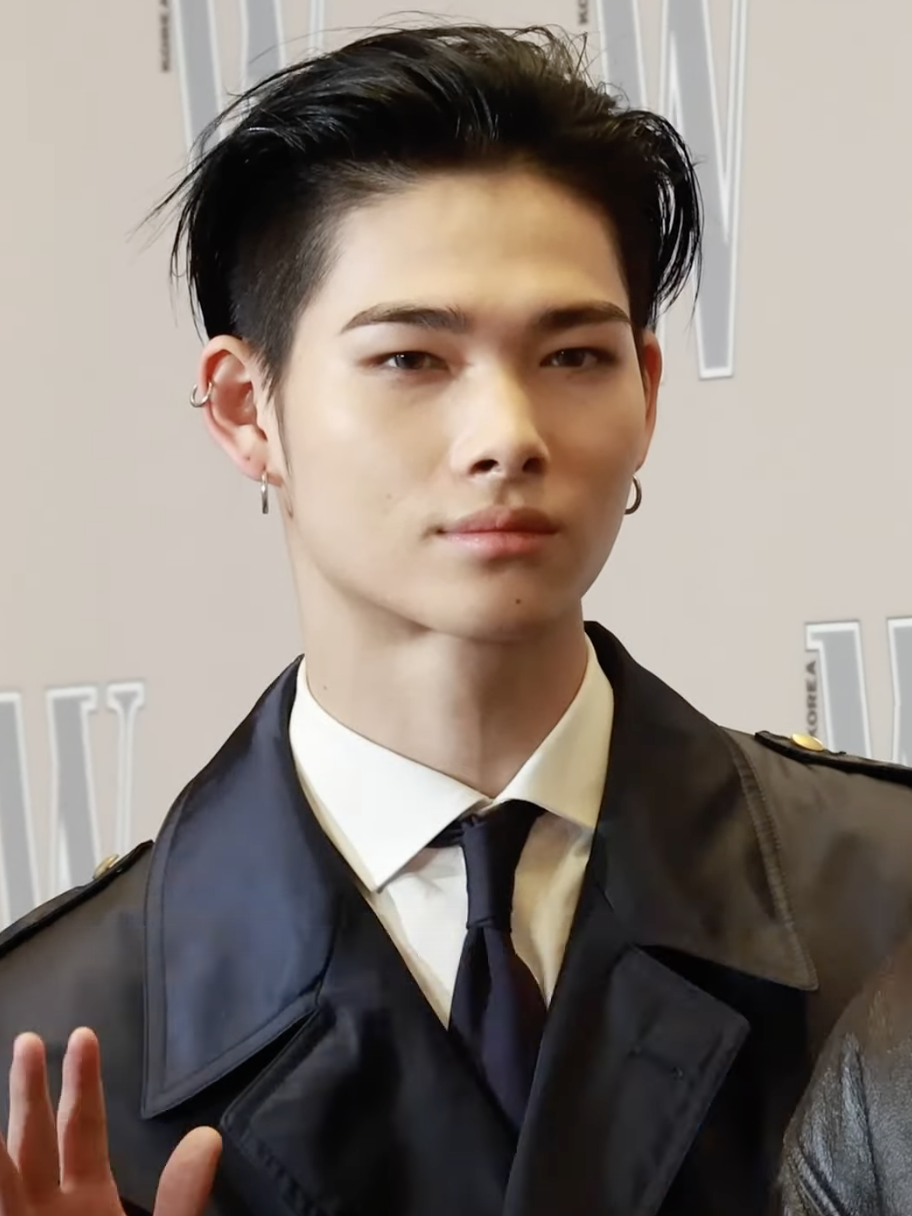
- Ni-Ki in 2024
- Born: Nishimura Riki; 9 December 2005 (age 20); Okayama, Okayama Prefecture, Japan
- Occupations: Singer; dancer
- Years active: 2014–present
- Musical career
- Origin: Seoul, South Korea
- Genre: K-pop
- Instrument: Vocals
- Years active: 2020–present
- Label: Belift Lab
- Member of: Enhypen

Japanese name
- Kanji: 西村 力
- Romanization: Nishimura Riki

Signature
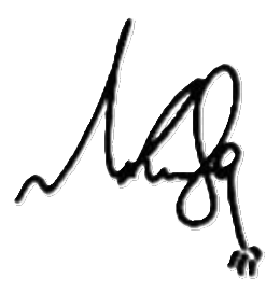

Nishimura Riki (Japanese: 西村 力; born 9 December 2005), known professionally as Ni-Ki (Japanese: ニキ), is a Japanese singer and dancer based in South Korea. He is a member of the boy band Enhypen under Belift Lab, formed through the reality survival show I-Land in 2020.

== Career ==
=== 2014–2019: Early life and pre-debut activities ===
As a middle schooler Ni-Ki taught dance lessons to cover his transportation costs.

In 2014, Ni-Ki passed the Kento Mori commercial audition, and appeared in a commercial for Sony DVD players in the same year.

In 2016, Ni-ki appeared in a Tokyo Ska Paradise Orchestra concert and danced to "Paradise Has No Border" and was a dancer in Legend Tokyo Chapter 5, performing a "Michael Jackson Legend Tribute" choreographed by Travis Payne. He also appeared on a Nichii Sharyo commercial using the name "Riki Jackson".

In 2017, he appeared as a dancer at the 2017 Yumi Katsura Grand Collection. He was also part of SHINee kids and appeared as a child dancer in Shinee World 2017. On March 11, Ni-Ki appeared in the music video for Yuzu's "タッタ".

=== 2020–present: Debut with Enhypen, and March 1 holiday remark incident ===
In 2019, Ni-Ki became a trainee under Belift in South Korea. He competed in the survival show I-Land in 2020, placing fourth and earning a spot in Enhypen. On November 30, 2020, he debuted as a member of Enhypen with the release of their first extended play (EP) Border: Day One.

In 2022, he appeared as a guest on &Team Gakuen. In April appeared on Studio Choom's MIX & MAX series performing a duet with Jungwon to "Bleeding Darkness" by BreadBeat and Junhyuk. He also helped choreograph the dance for "Bite Me", the title track of Enhypen's 4th EP, Dark Blood.

On May 14, 2023, he served as a special MC of KCON Japan 2023 with Dia Satek and Ryujin of Itzy.

On February 29, 2024, Ni-Ki learned from fans on Weverse that March 1 was a public holiday in South Korea and replied, "I'm jealous" (부럽다). The holiday commemorates the March First Movement of 1919 against Japanese colonial rule. Some considered his remark insensitive, while others viewed it as harmless. On March 1, he issued an apology on Weverse.

In May 2024 Ni-Ki was featured on Studio Choom as the Artist of the Month where he danced to "Trendsetter" by Connor Prince and Haviah Mighty and "HUMBLE" by Kendrick Lamar. On December 31, 2024, he performed "Guilty" with Shinee's Taemin at the 2024 MBC Gayo Daejejeon WANNABE.

== Filmography ==
=== Television shows ===
Year	Name	Role	Note	Ref.
2015	Mecha-Mecha Iketeru!			
2015	FNS 27hour TV			
2020	I-Land	Contestant	Finished in 4th place	
2021	New Japan Boy and Nakai			
2021	Legal Consultation Center with a Queue			
2022	To Masahiro Nakai's Friday Sumas			
2024	Make Make 1	Special judge		

=== Hosting ===
Year	Title	Role	Notes	Ref.
2023	KCON Japan 2023	MC	with Ryujin	

=== Radio presenting ===
Year	Name	Role	Note
2021－2022	Enhypen's All Night Nippon X	MC	

=== Commercials ===
Year	Commercial	Note
2014	Sony DVD player	
2016	Nichii Sharyo（Riki Jackson Ver）	
2018	Pocari Sweat	
2024	McDonald Triangle Choco Pie	
2025	Digital Hollywood University	
2025	Zone Energy	

=== Live performance ===
Year	Title	Artist	Role	Ref.
2016	Paradise Has No Border	Tokyo Ska Paradise Orchestra	Guest	
2016	Legend Tokyo Chapter 5 World Guest Piece: Michael Jackson Legend Tribute	Travis Payne	Dancer	
2017	Shinee World 2017	Shinee	Shinee Kids	

== Videography ==
=== Music video appearances ===
Year	Title	Singer	Role	Note	Ref.
2016	"Can't Feel My Face"	The Weeknd	Dancer	Japanese version MV	
2017	"タッタ"	Yuzu	Dancer		
