= Hyeongseop X Euiwoong =

South Korean musical duo

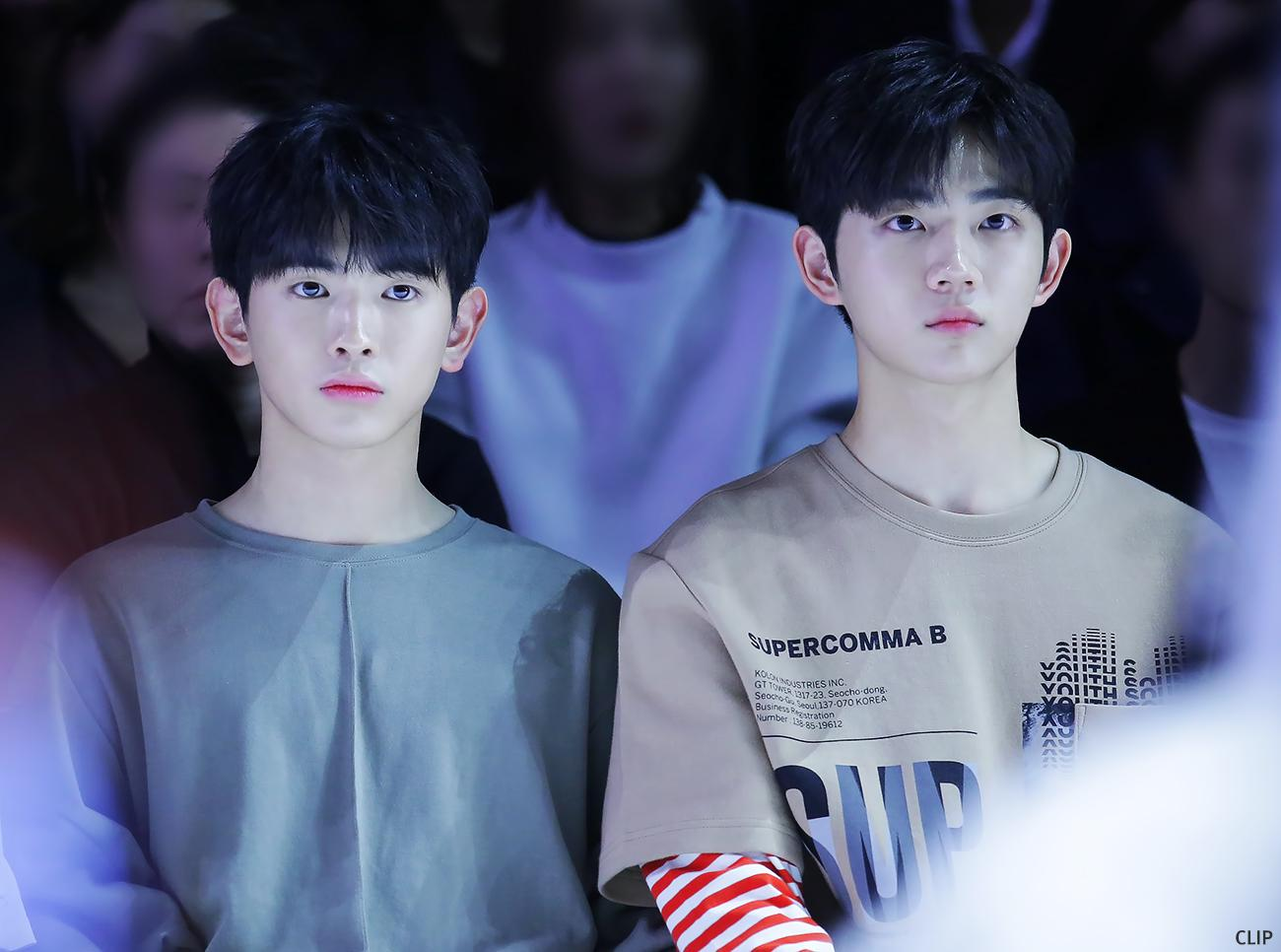
- Euiwoong (left) and Hyeongseop (right)

Background information
- Origin: Seoul, South Korea
- Genres: K-pop
- Years active: 2017–2018
- Labels: Yuehua
- Members: Hyeongseop; Euiwoong

Hyeongseop X Euiwoong (Korean: 형섭x의웅) is a South Korean duo formed by Yuehua Entertainment. The duo, composed of Ahn Hyeongseop and Lee Euiwoong, previously participated in Produce 101 Season 2. They debuted on November 2, 2017, with the single "It Will Be Good". Both of Hyeongseop and Euiwoong re-debuted in Yuehua's boy group Tempest on March 2, 2022.

== Members ==
- Ahn Hyeong-seop (안형섭)
- Lee Eui-woong (이의웅)

== Discography ==
=== Single albums ===
Title	Album details	Peak chart positions	Sales
Title	Album details	KOR	Sales
The Moment of Memory	Released: November 2, 2017; Label: Yuehua Entertainment; Formats: CD, digital download, streaming	5	KOR: 29,976
Color of Dream	Released: April 10, 2018; Label: Yuehua Entertainment; Formats: CD, digital download, streaming	10	KOR: 14,026

=== Singles ===
Title	Year	Album
"It Will Be Good" (좋겠다)	2017	The Moment of Memory
"Love Tint" (너에게 물들어)	2018	Color of Dream

== Awards and nominations ==
Year	Award	Category	Nominated work	Result
2018	Mnet Asian Music Awards	Best New Male Artist	Hyeongseop X Euiwoong	Nominated
2018	Soribada Best K-Music Awards	Rising Hot Star Award	Hyeongseop X Euiwoong	Won
