= Blank2y =

South Korean boy band

- Origin: Seoul, South Korea
- Genre: K-pop
- Years active: 2022–2023
- Labels: Keystone; DS
- Past members: DK; Louis; Donghyuk; Siwoo; Mikey; U; Youngbin; Sungjun; Sodam

Blank2y (Korean: 블랭키; RR: Beullaengki; stylized in all caps) was a South Korean boy band formed by Keystone Entertainment. The group consisted of nine members: DK, Louis, Donghyuk, Siwoo, Mikey, U, Youngbin, Sungjun, and Sodam. The group made their official debut on May 24, 2022, with their first EP titled K2Y I : Confidence [Thumbs Up].

== History ==
=== Background ===
Prior to the group's debut, Louis became a contestant in Under Nineteen under his birth name Kim Tae-woo and became a member of the debut lineup, finishing in 3rd place respectively. He debuted as a member of 1the9 on April 13, 2019, and officially disbanded as a group on August 8, 2020.

Donghyuk became a member of a seven member boy group ENOi under the stage name Avin. He made his debuted on April 19, 2019, with "Bloom". However, the group disbanded on January 22, 2021.

Siwoo became a contestant on Produce X 101 under his birth name Park Jin-yeol. However, he was eliminated in the first round ranking 81st. However, he joined The Wild Idol, which was aired from September 17, 2021, until December 16, 2021. Unfortunately, he was eliminated in the third episode and was unable to make it further in the show.

Mikey, under his real name Daisuke Morisaki participated in Produce 101 Japan 2. He was eliminated and ranked 68th upon episode 0, thus being unable to actually compete on the show.

Youngbin was a former contestant on Mnet's survival show I-Land. He was eliminated in the first part.

Sungjun was a former Woollim Entertainment trainee and was part of W Project 4. They released a single on September 2, 2019.

=== 2022: K2Y I : Confidence [Thumbs Up] and K2Y II : Passion [Fuego] ===
On May 6, the group announced their first mini album K2Y I : Confidence [Thumbs Up], which was released on May 24.

On August 2, the group announced their first comeback, with the mini album K2Y II : Passion [Fuego], which was released on August 24.

=== 2023: Members' departure from Keystone and disbandment ===
On February 25, 2023, an anonymous individual came forward accusing idol "Y" of perpetuating violence against his date, who was later confirmed to be Youngbin. Later that day, Keystone Entertainment confirmed the rumors, and announced that Youngbin had left Blank2y and the group will reorganize as eight members. On July 27th, 2023 Keystone announced that Dk, Louie, U, Sungjun and Soodam had terminated their contracts with the company. It was also announced that Donghyuk and Siwoo will be taking breaks due to their acting careers and Mikey will be on hiatus due to health reasons. However the same year, the remaining three members also signed with different agencies resulting in the group's possible disbandment.

== Former Members ==
- DK (닥)
- Louis (루이)
- Donghyuk (동혁)
- Siwoo (시우)
- Mikey (마이키)
- U (유)
- Youngbin (영빈)
- Sungjun (성준)
- Sodam (소담)

== Discography ==
=== Extended plays ===
List of extended plays, showing selected details, selected chart positions, and sales figures
Title	Details	Peak chart positions	Sales
Title	Details	KOR	Sales
K2Y I : Confidence [Thumbs Up]	Released: May 25, 2022; Label: Keystone Entertainment; Formats: CD, digital download, streaming; Track listing: 1. "Intro [R]"; 2. "Thumbs Up"; 3. "Thumbs Up" (English version); 4. "Touch"; 5. "Constellation - Fan Song" (별자리 - Fan Song)	6	KOR: 81,994
K2Y II : Passion [Fuego]	Released: August 24, 2022; Label: Keystone Entertainment; Formats: CD, digital download, streaming; Track listing: 1. "Intro [U]"; 2. "Fuego (Burn It Up)"; 3. "Fuego (Fearless)"; 4. "I Wish - Fan Song"	—	—

=== Singles ===
Title	Year	Peak position	Album
Title	Year	KOR	Album
"Thumbs Up"	2022	—	K2Y I : Confidence [Thumbs Up]
"Fuego (Burn It Up)"	2022	—	K2Y II : Passion [Fuego]
"—" denotes releases that did not chart or were not released in that region.

== Ambassadorship ==
- Honorary Ambassador to Promote Tourism in Korea and Vietnam (2022)
