= Hanbin (singer) =

Vietnamese singer (born 1998)

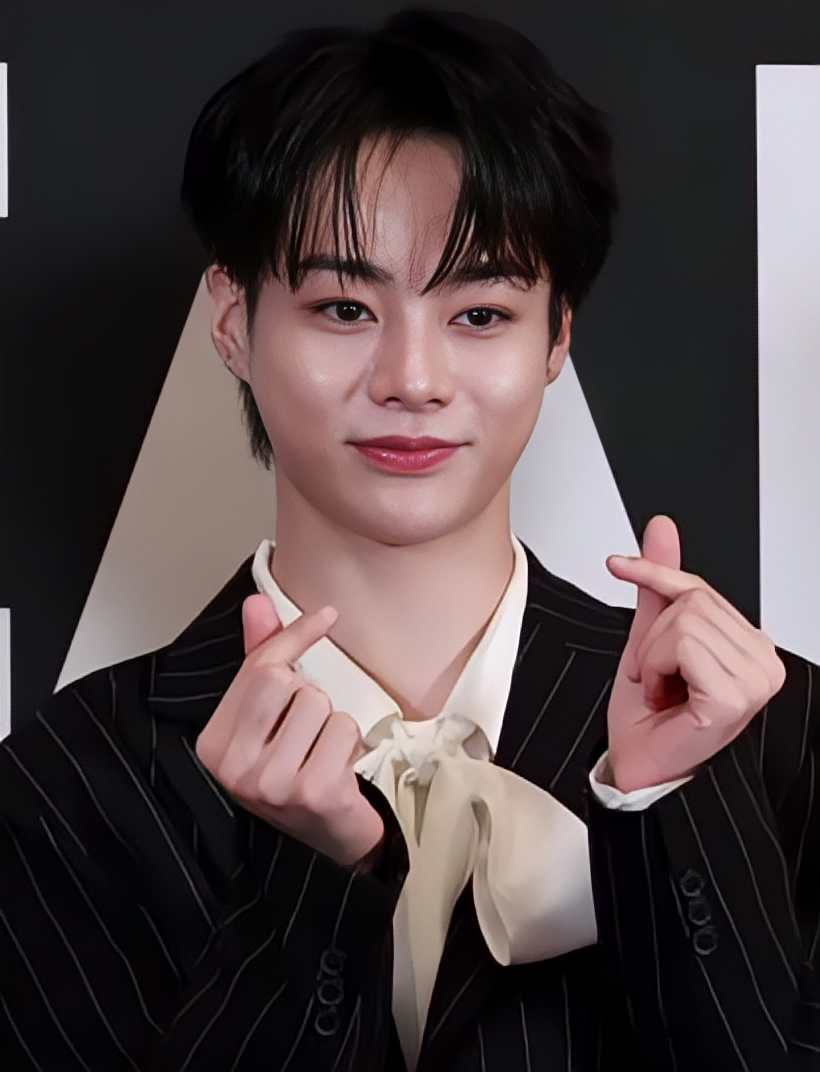
- Hanbin in September 2023
- Born: Ngô Ngọc Hưng; 19 January 1998 (age 28); Yên Bái, Vietnam
- Education: Vietnam University of Commerce, Hanoi (Đại học Thương mại)
- Occupation: Singer
- Musical career
- Genre: K-pop
- Years active: 2020–present
- Label: Yuehua Entertainment
- Member of: Tempest
- Website: yhfamily.co.kr/index.php

Korean name
- Hangul: 한빈
- Hanja: 韓彬
- RR: Hanbin
- MR: Hanbin

Ngô Ngọc Hưng (born 19 January 1998) or Hưng Bin, known professionally as Hanbin (Korean: 한빈), is a Vietnamese singer based in South Korea. He gained recognition by competing on Mnet survival show I-Land, before becoming a member of boy group Tempest. He is the first Vietnamese male to become a K-pop idol.

== Early life ==
Hanbin was born in Yên Bái, Vietnam. He is a self-taught dancer since 15, according to his online fanmeeting. He moved to Hanoi for university where he founded and led a dance group, C.A.C, for three years (2016–2019) under the stage name Hưng Bin. Hanbin started training for the show in July 2019, according to his I-Land profile, after passing the audition in Hanoi.

== Career ==
=== 2020–2021: I-Land, first fanmeeting, and agency changes ===
On 2 June 2020, he was introduced as a participant in the CJ ENM and HYBE's then upcoming survival show I-Land. On the first episode, he performed "Jopping" by SuperM with Ni-Ki and Nicholas, but was 'eliminated' by voting among the trainees and was placed in "Ground". On the 7th episode, he ranked 12th based on the global votes and was able to move onto Part 2 and become one of the final 12. On Episode 10, Hanbin ranked 4th out of 11 trainees in Global Voting with 1,415,420 votes. On Episode 11, he was eliminated ranking in at 10th place.

Following his debut on the survival show, on 20 October, Belift Lab announced that Hanbin would be holding an online fanmeeting called "Hanbin !00%" on 31 October. On 16 December, he opened up a Twitter account, on which he gathered over 150,000 followers in 24 hours. On 31 December, Hanbin performed a solo pre-opening stage at Big Hit NYEL Concert to the song "I&Credible".

On 2 June 2021, Belift Lab announced that Hanbin had left the agency following discussions and was later revealed that Hanbin had signed with Yuehua Entertainment.

=== 2022–present: Debut with Tempest and solo debut ===
On 3 January 2022, Hanbin was introduced as the fifth member of the group Tempest. They debuted on 2 March 2022 with the EP It's Me, It's We. He is the first Vietnamese male to debut in a K-pop idol group.

On Monday, August 24, 2026, at 6 PM KST, HANBIN (TEMPEST) 1st Digital Single – No Fear was released, featuring the title track “No Fear (Feat. punchnello). Both the title track 'No Fear (Feat. punchnello)' and the album track 'Air' from Hanbin's first solo single 'No Fear' appeared in Vietnam's iTunes Top Songs Chart TOP10 on the afternoon of August 26.

On October 20, 2026, Yuehua Entertainment announced TEMPEST's disbandment.

== Filmography ==
=== Television ===
Year	Channel	Title	Notes	Ref
2020	Mnet	I-Land	Contestant	

== Awards and nominations ==
Name of the award ceremony, year presented, award category, nominee(s) of the award, and the result of the nomination
Year	Award ceremony	Category	Nominee(s) / Work(s)	Result	Ref.
2023	WeChoice Awards	Rising Artist	Himself	Won	
