= Border: Day One =

2020 EP by Enhypen

- Digital and "Dusk" version cover

EP by Enhypen
- Released: November 30, 2020
- Recorded: 2020
- Genres: K-pop; hip hop; reggae; R&B
- Length: 15:35
- Labels: Belift Lab; Genie Music; Stone Music

Enhypen chronology
| Border: Day One (2020) | Border: Carnival (2021) |

Singles from Border: Day One
- 1. "Given-Taken" Released: November 30, 2020

Border: Day One (stylized in all caps) is the debut extended play (EP) by South Korean boy band Enhypen consisting 7 members. It was released through Belift Lab, Genie Music and Stone Music Entertainment on November 30, 2020. The album consists of six tracks, including the lead single "Given-Taken".

== Background and release ==
Enhypen was formed through the 2020 survival competition series I-Land and is the first group ever to be produced by Belift Lab, a joint venture between the South Korean entertainment agencies CJ ENM and Big Hit Entertainment. After the debut line-up was revealed through the show's live finale on September 18, 2020, Belift Lab launched the group's official website and social media platforms. A pre-debut promotion schedule was released on September 30. On October 22, 2020, a debut trailer titled "Choose-Chosen" was posted to Enhypen's YouTube channel, announcing their debut in November 2020. The video portrayed the seven band members in a dark forest with words of opposite meanings such as "Failure-Success," "Given-Taken," "Blood-Light," "Us-the Others," and "Mortal-Immortal," on the screen. A second trailer titled "Dusk-Dawn" was released on October 25, followed by a pair of concept mood boards released on October 27. On October 28, Belift Lab announced through the global fan community platform Weverse that Enhypen will release their first extended play, Border: Day One on November 30.

Pre-orders began the same day and the album was made available in two versions: Dusk and Dawn. Solo concept photos for the "Dusk" version were revealed on October 31. A group concept photo was teased the next day. Solo and group concept photos for the "Dawn" version were posted on November 9 and 10, respectively. Moving portraits of the seven members were revealed sequentially from the afternoon of November 12 till November 13. The band shared a lyric video of the intro titled "Intro: Walk the Line" from the album, three days later. The album's track list was posted on November 20. A preview of the tracks featured on the album was released on November 23. Two music video teasers for the lead single "Given-Taken" were uploaded to YouTube on November 25 and 27, respectively. The album was released on November 30, 2020, in CD and digital formats. The music video for the lead single "Given-Taken", directed by Yong Seok Choi of Lumpens, was released to Big Hit's YouTube channel in conjunction with the release of the album.

== Promotion ==
A few hours prior to the album release, Enhypen held their first-ever media showcase in Seoul, which was broadcast online through YouTube. The band performed the songs "Given-Taken" and "Let Me In (20 CUBE)" for the first time at the showcase. Hours after the album release, a debut show titled "Enhypen Debut Show: Day One" hosted by Mnet, was premiered worldwide, where Enhypen performed "Flicker", "Let Me In (20 CUBE)", "10 Months" and "Given-Taken". The band performed "Given-Taken" again on the 2020 FNS Music Festival on December 2. Enhypen began promoting the album with televised live performances on several South Korean weekly music programs, starting with KBS' Music Bank on December 4, where they performed "Given-Taken". The band also appeared on SBS' Inkigayo and SBS MTV's The Show, to perform the song. Enhypen also performed the song at the 2020 Mnet Asian Music Awards on December 6 and the 2020 The Fact Music Awards on December 12. On December 18, they performed the song at the 2020 KBS Song Festival and MTV Fresh Live Out. Enhypen performed the song at the SBS Gayo Daejeon on December 25.

== Commercial performance ==
On November 4, it was announced that album pre-orders had surpassed 150,000 copies in just two days. By November 21, pre-orders had surpassed 300,000 copies. Border: Day One debuted at number two on the Gaon Album Chart on the chart issue dated December 5, 2020. On the Hanteo Chart, the album sold 280,873 copies during its first week of release, breaking the record for the highest-sales among the K-pop groups that debuted in 2020. Border: Day One was the second best-selling album of November 2020 in South Korea, selling 318,528 physical copies. Border: Day One debuted at number one on the Japanese Oricon Daily Album Chart on issue date of December 4, 2020. The album entered the Oricon Weekly Albums Chart at number two, selling 71,404 copies in its first week. The EP opened at number two on Billboard Japan's Hot Albums chart on the chart issue dated December 14, 2020, while "Given-Taken" arrived at number 45 on the Japan Hot 100.

== Accolades ==
Dazed included "Given-Taken" in their list of The 40 Best K-pop Songs of 2020 at number 34, noting its "flowing chorus, well-balanced harmonies, and an intriguing vampire concept". BuzzFeed included it in their list of the 35 Songs That Helped Define K-Pop In 2020, while MTV ranked "Intro: Walk the Line" number 11 in their list of The Best K-Pop B-Sides of 2020.

Awards and nominations for Border: Day One
| Ceremony | Year | Award | Result | Ref. |
|---|---|---|---|---|
| Gaon Chart Music Awards | 2020 | New Artist of the Year – Physical | Won | |

== Track listing ==
Credits adapted from Spotify and physical album credits.

Border: Day One Track List
| No. | Title | Writer(s) | Producer(s) | Length |
|---|---|---|---|---|
| 1. | "Intro: Walk the Line" | Wonderkid; Ca$hcow; Big Hit Entertainment; "Hitman" Bang | Wonderkid; Ca$hcow | 1:49 |
| 2. | "Given-Taken" | Wonderkid; Lil 27 Club; "Hitman" Bang; Melanie Joy Fontana; Andreas Carlsson; Michel "Lindgren" Schulz; Moa "Cazzi Opeia" Carlebecker (Sunshine); Ellen Berg (Sunshine); Kyler Niko | Wonderkid; "Hitman" Bang | 3:03 |
| 3. | "Let Me In (20 Cube)" | Frants; Kyler Niko; "Hitman" Bang; Lee Yi-jin; January 8th; Lee Seu-ran; Danke (Lalala Studio); Lutra; Cho Yu-ri (Jam Factory) | Frants; "Hitman" Bang | 3:10 |
| 4. | "10 Months" | Peter Rycroft; Andrew Bullimore; Tom Mann; Josh Record; "Hitman" Bang; Midnight Dive; Jo Yoon-kyung; Danke (Lalala Studio); Park Young-woong; Lee Yi-jin; Kim Soo-jung | Lostboy | 3:14 |
| 5. | "Flicker" | Max Lynedoch Graham; Matt Thomson; Ryan Lawrie; Jo Yoon-kyung; "Hitman" Bang; James F Reynolds; Seo Young-jun (krr); Lee Seu-ran | Arcades | 2:24 |
| 6. | "Outro: Cross the Line" | Shinkung; Wonderkid; Big Hit Entertainment | Wonderkid; Shinkung | 1:55 |
| Total length: | | | | 15:35 |

== Credits and personnel ==
Credits adapted from KuWo and QQ Music.

- Enhypen – vocals (track 2–5)
  - Heeseung – background vocals (track 2)
  - Jake – background vocals (track 2)
- Ca$hcow – background vocals (track 1–2, 4), vocal arrangement (track 1–4), synthesizer (track 1), digital editing (track 1–4, 6), choir arrangement (track 6)
- Melanie Joy Fontana – background vocals (track 2)
- Kyler Niko – background vocals (track 2–3), recording engineer (track 2–3)
- Sunshine (Cazzi Opeia & Ellen Berg) – background vocals (track 2), recording engineer (track 2)
- Vendors (Kevin Leinster Jr.) – background vocals (track 3)
- June – background vocals (track 5)
- Ryan Lawrie – background vocals (track 5)
- Wonderkid – keyboard (track 1–2), vocal arrangement (track 2, 4), digital editing (track 2–5), synthesizer (track 6)
- Young – guitar (track 1, 3)
- Yung String – string (track 1, 6)
- "Hitman" Bang – synthesizer (track 2)
- Frants – keyboard (track 3), bass (track 3)
- Lostboy – keyboard (track 4), drum programming (track 4)
- Max Graham – synthesizer (track 5), guitar (track 5), background vocals (track 5), programming (track 5)
- Matt Thomson – synthesizer (track 5), guitar (track 5), background vocals (track 5), programming (track 5)
- Yeon Eum Children's Choir – choir (track 6)
- Shinkung – string arrangement (track 1, 6), vocal arrangement (track 3, 5), digital editing (track 5), keyboard (track 6), choir arrangement (track 6)
- Kim Ji-yeon – recording engineer (track 1–3, 5–6)
- Kim Cho-rong – recording engineer (track 1, 3)
- Oh Seong-geun – recording engineer (track 1, 6)
- Son Yu-jeong – recording engineer (track 2, 4, 5–6)
- Michel "Lindgren" Schulz – recording engineer (track 2)
- Woo Min-jeong – digital editing (track 2–3)
- Yang Ga – mix engineer (track 1)
- Manny Marrouin – mix engineer (track 2)
- Jeremie Inhaber – mix engineer (track 2)
- Phil Tan – mix engineer (track 3)
- Erik Madrid – mix engineer (track 4)
- Park Jinse – mix engineer (track 5)
- Jeong Woo-yeong – mix engineer (track 6)
- Bill Zimmerman – additional engineering (track 3)
- Chris Galland – assistant mixer (track 2)
- Zach Pereyra – assistant mixer (track 2)
- Aaron Berman – assistant mixer (track 4)
- Augustine Lim – assistant mixer (track 4)

== Charts ==
=== Weekly charts ===
Weekly chart performance
| Chart (2020–2023) | Peak position |
|---|---|
| Belgian Albums (Ultratop Flanders) | 60 |
| Belgian Albums (Ultratop Wallonia) | 79 |
| German Albums (Offizielle Top 100) | 95 |
| Hungarian Albums (MAHASZ) | 25 |
| Japanese Albums (Oricon) | 2 |
| Japan Hot Albums (Billboard Japan) | 2 |
| South Korean Albums (Gaon) | 2 |
| Swiss Albums (Schweizer Hitparade) | 99 |
| UK Digital Albums (OCC) | 68 |

=== Monthly chart ===
Monthly chart performance
| Chart (November 2020) | Position |
|---|---|
| South Korean Albums (Gaon) | 2 |

=== Year-end charts ===
Year-end chart performance
| Chart (2020) | Position |
|---|---|
| Japanese Albums (Oricon) | 39 |
| South Korean Albums (Gaon) | 24 |

Year-end chart performance
| Chart (2021) | Position |
|---|---|
| South Korean Albums (Gaon) | 57 |

== Certifications and sales ==
Sales certifications for Border: Day One
| Region | Certification | Certified units/sales |
|---|---|---|
| Japan (RIAJ) | Gold | 100,000^{^} |
| South Korea (KMCA) | 3× Platinum | 636,129 |
^{^} Shipments figures based on certification alone.

== Release history ==
Release formats for Border: Day One
| Region | Date | Format | Label | Ref. |
|---|---|---|---|---|
| Various | November 30, 2020 | CD; digital download; streaming | Belift Lab; Genie Music; Stone Music Entertainment | |
