= Tempest (South Korean band) =

South Korean boy group (2022–2026)

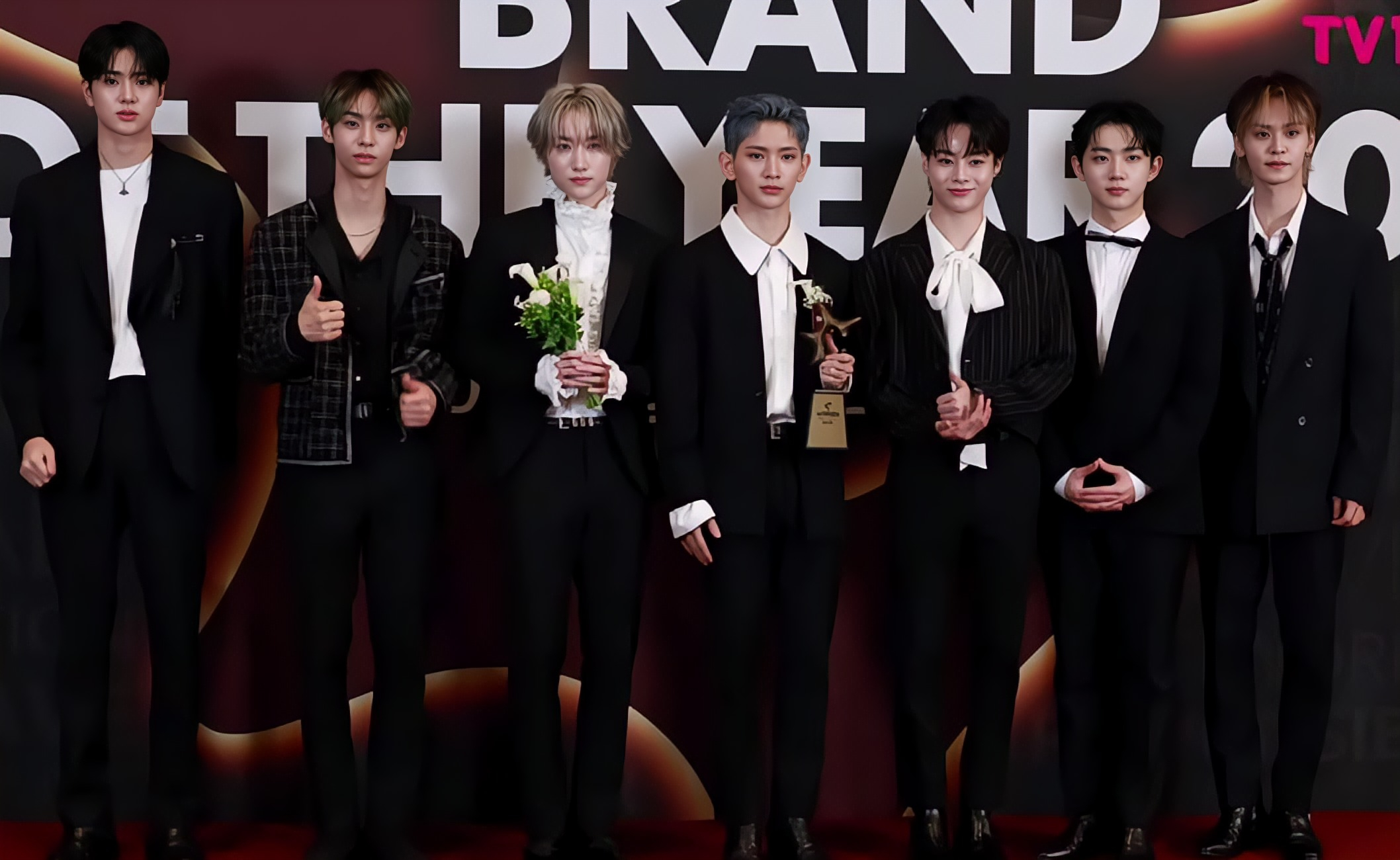
- Tempest in September 2023; L–R: Eunchan, Hwarang, Hyuk, LEW, Hanbin, Hyeongseop, and Taerae

Background information
- Origin: Seoul, South Korea
- Genres: K-pop, hip hop
- Years active: 2022–2026
- Labels: YH; Nippon Columbia
- Spinoffs: Hyeongseop X Euiwoong
- Past members: Hanbin; Hyeongseop; Hyuk; Eunchan; Lew; Taerae; Hwarang
- Website: yhfamily.co.kr/tempest

Tempest (Korean: 템페스트, stylized in all caps) was a South Korean boy band formed by YH Entertainment. The group consisted of six members: Hanbin, Hyeongseop, Hyuk, Eunchan, Lew, and Taerae. Tempest was originally a seven-piece ensemble; Hwarang departed from the group in August 2024. They made their debut on March 2, 2022, with the extended play (EP) It's Me, It's We. The group announced their disbandment on October 20, 2026.

== History ==
=== Pre-debut ===
==== Members ====
Hyeongseop and Lew both participated in Mnet's reality television competition Produce 101 Season 2 in 2017. Lew was eliminated in the third round ranking 23rd and Hyeongseop was eliminated in the final episode ranking 16th. They debuted as Hyeongseop X Euiwoong on November 2, 2017, with the single "It Will Be Good".

Hwarang, under the name Song Jae-won, competed on MBC's reality television competition Under Nineteen in 2018. He was eliminated in episode 12 after placing 11th in the performance team and 32nd overall.

Hanbin competed in Mnet's reality television competition I-Land in 2020. He was eliminated in part 2 and ranked 10th. In October 2020, he held an online fan meeting called "!00%". In December 2020, he opened his official Twitter account, and performed a pre-opening stage at Big Hit NYEL Concert with the song "I&Credible". On June 2, 2021, it was announced that Hanbin had left Belift Lab and signed an exclusive contract with YH.

==== Group ====
On June 8, 2021, YH Entertainment officially trademarked three names: Tempest, TPST, and 템페스트.

On October 4, Star News reported that Yue Hua would be debuting a new boy group in the second half of 2021. It was also stated in the article that the group would go by the name "Tempest" and that Hyungseop and Euiwoong, who had previously debuted as the duo HyeongseopXEuiwoong, would be a part of the group's lineup.

On December 31, the group's official SNS accounts were opened along with the motion video of their logo and on January 3, 2022, teaser photos for the seven members were released.

=== 2022: Debut with It's Me, It's We, Shining Up and On and On ===
Tempest was originally scheduled to debut on February 21, 2022, however, on February 14, YH Entertainment announced that they would be postponing the group's debut to March 2, 2022, as all the seven members of the group tested positive for COVID-19. The group made their official debut on March 2, 2022, with their debut EP It's Me, It's We.

The group made their first comeback on August 29, 2022, with their second EP Shining Up. On September 18, Tempest got their 1st Inkigayo Hot Stage win in Inkigayo, with over 10,000 votes.

On November 22, 2022, the group released their third EP On and On. On November 30, Tempest got their first ever official win in Korean music show Show Champion with song "Dragon".

=== 2023: The Calm Before the Storm and Into the Tempest ===
The group released their fourth EP The Calm Before the Storm, on April 17, 2023.

On June 19, Tempest released an ID clip for their first solo concert 2023 Tempest Show Con [T-OUR] will be held on August 12 and 13 at SK Handball Stadium. On June 20, Tempest announced that their first solo concert will also be held in Japan. On August 25, Tempest announced another date for their concert - this time in Macau.

On September 20, 2023, the group came back with their first single album Into the Tempest.

On September 27, Tempest got their second win in Show Champion with song "Vroom Vroom". Later, the group got their first ever win on Korean show Music Bank also with the song "Vroom Vroom".

On October 19, YH Entertainment announced that Hwarang would undergo surgery for his injured shoulder and would be going on hiatus to recover.

=== 2024: Tempest Voyage, Japanese debut with Bang! and Hwarang's departure ===
On January 8, it was announced that Tempest would release their Japanese pre-debut single "Baddest Behavior" on January 31 as the ending theme for anime Run for Money: The Great Mission.

On February 8, Tempest announced their first fan concert 2024 TEMPEST Fan Concert [UNiEVERSITY] would be held on April 13 and 14 at Yonsei University Auditorium.

On February 16, Tempest released a poster through their SNS account hints their upcoming new album set to release on March 11. On February 19, Tempest revealed their fifth EP Tempest Voyage, through the released of scheduler image.

On February 25, Nippon Columbia announced that Tempest would debut in Japan with the first Japanese EP Bang! on April 10.

On March 6, YH announced that Hwarang's activities have been suspended following personal controversies. After five months of being on hiatus, Hwarang's contract with Yuehua has been terminated and he would depart from the group. Tempest would continue to promote as a six-member group thereafter.

=== 2025–2026: Re: Full of Youth, As I Am and disbandment ===
On March 7, 2025, YH Entertainment announced that Tempest would make a comeback with their sixth EP Re: Full of Youth, which was released on March 31, 2025. A few months later, they dropped their single "My Way", which was featured as an anime opening for the anime Busaman Gachi Fighter.

On September 14, a YouTube short was put onto Tempest's official YouTube channel showcasing Hanbin in glasses announcing their new album through morose code. From September 14 to October 27, Tempest promoted their EP As I Am through short concept videos and photos. The album has five songs on it with the title track being "In The Dark".

On October 20, 2026, YH Entertainment released a statement announcing the group's disbandment.

== Members ==
Adapted from YH Entertainment's website:

Former

- Hanbin (한빈) – vocalist, dancer
- Hyeongseop (형섭) – vocalist
- Hyuk (혁) – vocalist
- Eunchan (은찬) – vocalist
- Lew (루) – leader, vocalist, rapper
- Taerae (태래) – rapper
- Hwarang (화랑) – rapper, dancer

== Discography ==
=== Extended plays ===
List of extended plays, showing selected details, selected chart positions, and sales figures
Title	Details	Peak chart positions			Sales
Title	Details	KOR	JPN	JPN Hot	Sales
It's Me, It's We	Released: March 2, 2022; Label: YH Entertainment; Formats: CD, digital download, streaming; Track listing: 1. "Bad News"; 2. "Just a Little Bit"; 3. "Find Me"; 4. "Next to You" (있을게); 5. "Bad at Love"	2	—	—	KOR: 97,492
Shining Up	Released: August 29, 2022; Label: YH Entertainment; Formats: CD, digital download, streaming; Track listing: 1. "Young & Wild"; 2. "Can't Stop Shining"; 3. "Only One Day" (하루만); 4. "Start Up"	2	—	—	KOR: 80,563
On and On	Released: November 22, 2022; Label: YH Entertainment; Formats: CD, digital download, streaming; Track listing: 1. "Taste the Feeling"; 2. "Dragon" (飛上); 3. "Loving Number"; 4. "Raise Me Up"	1	—	—	KOR: 120,367
The Calm Before the Storm (폭풍전야)	Released: April 17, 2023; Label: YH Entertainment; Formats: CD, digital download, streaming; Track listing: 1. "Eye of the Storm" (폭풍의 눈); 2. "Dangerous" (난장); 3. "Freak Show"; 4. "I'll Be There"	4	19	—	KOR: 116,348; JPN: 3,846
Voyage	Released: March 11, 2024; Label: YH Entertainment; Formats: CD, digital download, streaming; Track listing: 1. "Lighthouse"; 2. "There"; 3. "B.O.K"; 4. "Slow Motion"	1	21	19	KOR: 130,247; JPN: 1,589
Bang!	Released: April 10, 2024; Label: Nippon Columbia; Formats: CD, digital download, streaming	—	7	7	JPN: 9,814
Bubble Gum	Released: December 11, 2024; Label: Nippon Columbia; Formats: CD, digital download, streaming	—	10	12	JPN: 6,933
Re: Full of Youth	Released: March 31, 2025; Label: YH Entertainment; Formats: CD, digital download, streaming; Track listing: 1. "We Are the Young"; 2. "Unfreeze"; 3. "Destiny"; 4. "Only U Can"; 5. "Come Back Home"	8	—	—	KOR: 56,384
As I Am	Released: October 27, 2025; Label: YH Entertainment; Formats: CD, digital download, streaming; Track listing: 1. "In the Dark"; 2. "Nocturnal"; 3. "Chill"; 4. "Silly Kid"; 5. "How Deep Is Your Love?"	8	20	—	KOR: 59,935; JPN: 1,050

=== Single albums ===
List of single albums, showing selected details, selected chart positions, and sales figures
Title	Details	Peak chart positions	Sales
Title	Details	KOR	Sales
Into the Tempest (폭풍 속으로)	Released: September 20, 2023; Label: YH Entertainment; Formats: CD, digital download, streaming; Track listing: 1. "Vroom Vroom"; 2. "Dive"; 3. "Bluetooth"	2	KOR: 163,043

=== Singles ===
List of singles, showing year released, selected chart positions, and name of the album
Title	Year	Peak chart positions				Album
Title	Year	KOR Down.	VIE Hot	JP	CH	Album
Korean
"Bad News"	2022	164	54	—	—	It's Me, It's We
"Can't Stop Shining"	2022	10	—	—	—	Shining Up
"Dragon (飛上)"	2022	23	—	—	—	On & On
"Dangerous" (난장)	2023	108	—	—	—	The Calm Before the Storm
"Vroom Vroom"	2023	31	68	—	—	Into the Tempest
"Lighthouse"	2024	19	45	—	18	Tempest Voyage
"Destiny"	2025	—	—	—	—	Re: Full of Youth
"Unfreeze"	2025	5	—	—	—	Re: Full of Youth
"In the Dark"	2025	12	—	—	—	As I Am
Japanese
"Baddest Behavior"	2024	30	—	22	—	Bang!
"Bang!"	2024	—	—	6	—	Bang!
"Bubble Gum"	2024	—	—	—	—	Bubble Gum
"My Way"	2025	—	—	—	—	Non-album single
Chinese
"Unfreeze (Chinese Ver.)"	2025	—	—	—	42	Non-album single
"In the Dark (Chinese Ver.)"	2025	—	—	—	58	Non-album single
"—" denotes a recording that did not chart or was not released in that territory

== Videography ==
=== Music videos ===
Title	Year	Director(s)	Ref.
"Bad News"	2022	Kwon Yong-soo (Studio Saccharin)	
"Can't Stop Shining"	2022	Kim Zi-young (FantazyLab)	
"Young & Wild"	2022	Song Jung-hwan	
"Dragon" (飛上)	2022	Kwon Yong-soo (Studio Saccharin)	
"Taste The Feeling"	2022	Song Jung-hwan	
"Dangerous"	2023	Kwon Yong-soo (Studio Saccharin)	
"Freak Show"	2023	Song Jung-hwan	
"Vroom Vroom"	2023	Naive	
"Lighthouse"	2024	Guzza (Kudo)	
"There"	2024	Song Jung-hwan	
"Bang!"	2024	Kim Zi-yong (FantazyLab)	
"Bubble Gum"	2024	Kim Zi-yong (FantazyLab)	
"Unfreeze"	2025	Sooyeon Kim	
"In The Dark"	2025	Kim Gun (Studio Paranoid)	

== Awards and nominations ==
Name of the award ceremony, year presented, category, nominee of the award, and the result of the nomination
Award ceremony	Year	Category	Nominee / Work	Result	Ref.
Asia Artist Awards	2022	New Wave Award – Singer	Tempest	Won	
Asia Artist Awards	2023	Icon Award	Tempest	Won	
Brand Customer Loyalty Awards	2023	Male Idol (Rookie) Award	Tempest	Won	
Brand of the Year Awards	2022	Male Idol Rookie of the Year	Tempest	Won	
Brand of the Year Awards	2023	Male Idol Rising Star	Tempest	Won	
Brand of the Year Awards	2024	Male Idol of the Year	Tempest	Won	
Brand of the Year Awards	2024	Male Idol of the Year (Vietnam)	Tempest	Won	
Brand of the Year Awards	2025	Male Idol of the Year (Vietnam)	Tempest	Won	
Circle Chart Music Awards	2022	IdolPlus New Star Award	Tempest	Won	
Genie Music Awards	2022	Best Male Rookie Award	Tempest	Won	
Hanteo Music Awards	2023	Global Rising Artist Award – China	Tempest	Won	
Hanteo Music Awards	2023	Global Rising Artist Award – Japan	Tempest	Won	
Hanteo Music Awards	2023	Rookie of the Year – Male	Tempest	Won	
Hanteo Music Awards	2024	Emerging Artist Award	Tempest	Won	
Korea First Brand Awards	2023	Best Rookie Male Idol	Tempest	Won	
Korea First Brand Awards	2024	Best Male Idol	Tempest	Won	
Korea First Brand Awards	2024	Best Male Idol (Vietnam)	Tempest	Won	
Korea First Brand Awards	2025	Best Male Idol (Vietnam)	Tempest	Won	
MAMA Awards	2022	Best New Male Artist	Tempest	Nominated	
MAMA Awards	2022	Artist of the Year	Tempest	Longlisted	
Seoul Music Awards	2023	Rookie Award	Tempest	Nominated	
Seoul Music Awards	2023	Popularity Award	Tempest	Nominated	
Seoul Music Awards	2023	Hallyu Special Award	Tempest	Nominated	
Seoul Music Awards	2023	IdolPlus New Star Award	Tempest	Won	
