= List of Circle Album Chart number ones of 2025 =

The Circle Album Chart is a South Korean record chart that ranks the best-selling albums and EPs in South Korea. It is part of the Circle Chart, which launched in February 2010 as the Gaon Chart. The data is compiled by the Ministry of Culture, Sports and Tourism and the Korea Music Content Industry Association based upon weekly/monthly physical album sales by major South Korean distributors such as Kakao Entertainment, YG Plus, Sony Music Korea, Warner Music Korea, Universal Music and Dreamus.

== Weekly charts ==
Key
†	Indicates best-selling album of 2025

List of number-one albums on the weekly Circle Album Chart in 2025
Week ending date	Album	Artist	Weekly sales	Ref.
January 4	Dreamscape	NCT Dream	31,709	
January 11	Teleparty	BSS	500,000	
January 18	Ocean	Park Ji-hyeon	248,488	
January 25	Flip It, Kick It!	KickFlip	311,369	
February 1	Explorer	Eunhyuk	44,369	
February 8	Ive Empathy	Ive	1,370,220	
February 15	Amortage	Jisoo	194,000	
February 22	ONF: My Identity	ONF	90,877	
March 1	Blue Paradise	Zerobaseone	1,236,982	
March 8	Pleasure	Treasure	612,398	
March 15	Hot	Le Sserafim	622,293	
March 22	Fe3O4: Forward	Nmixx	620,330	
March 29	Uncut Gem	KiiiKiii	206,221	
April 5	Unexpected	The Boyz	233,935	
April 12	The Firstfruit	Mark	329,610	
April 19	Poppop	NCT Wish	937,571	
April 26	Try with Us	TWS	553,178	
May 3	O-RLY?	Nexz	195,487	
May 10	Duh!	P1Harmony	229,121	
May 17	No Genre	BoyNextDoor	1,068,522	
May 24	Odyssey	Riize	1,393,530	
May 31	Happy Burstday	Seventeen	2,349,695	
June 7	Desire: Unleash	Enhypen	1,977,105	
June 14	Golden Hour: Part.3	Ateez	573,863	
June 21	Bomb	Illit	373,931	
June 28	Dirty Work	Aespa	872,842	
July 5	N: Number of Cases	Nouera	133,950	
July 12	This Is For	Twice	671,771	
July 19	Go Back to the Future	NCT Dream	880,177	
July 26	The Star Chapter: Together	Tomorrow X Together	1,614,628	
August 2	A;Effect	The Boyz	461,591	
August 9	Love Anecdote(s)	Evnne	135,493	
August 16	Unevermet	Idntt	320,062	
August 23	Karma †	Stray Kids	2,277,910	
August 30	Ive Secret	Ive	998,981	
September 6	Never Say Never	Zerobaseone	1,459,415	
September 13	Taste	Haechan	400,827	
September 20	I Did It.	Idid	441,524	
September 27	My First Flip	KickFlip	245,752	
October 4	Hype Vibes	CxM	830,000	
October 11	We Go Up	Babymonster	533,686	
October 18	Play Hard	TWS	605,645	
October 25	The Action	BoyNextDoor	990,384	
November 1	Back to Life	&Team	1,206,864	
November 8	No Labels: Part 01	Yeonjun	330,724	
November 15	Plbbuu	Plave	709,645	
November 22	Do It	Stray Kids	2,030,000	
November 29	Fame	Riize	412,524	
December 6	Lost and Found	Verivery	100,000	
December 13	Eternal White	WayV	140,000	
December 20	No Labels: Part 01	Yeonjun	50,568	
December 27	Color Outside the Lines	Cortis	61,700	

== Monthly charts ==
List of number-one albums on the monthly Circle Album Chart in 2025
Month	Album	Artist	Sales	Ref.
January	Teleparty	BSS	499,999	
February	Ive Empathy	Ive	1,418,177	
March	Pleasure	Treasure	796,505	
April	Poppop	NCT Wish	978,531	
May	Happy Burstday	Seventeen	2,349,695	
June	Desire: Unleash	Enhypen	2,099,514	
July	The Star Chapter: Together	Tomorrow X Together	1,727,686	
August	Karma	Stray Kids	2,954,420	
September	Never Say Never	Zerobaseone	1,458,247	
October	Back to Life	&Team	1,206,864	
November	Do It	Stray Kids	2,240,000	
December	Color Outside the Lines	Cortis	156,986	
