= &Audition – The Howling =

Japanese reality television show

- Official poster
- Opening theme: "The Final Countdown"
- Countries of origin: South Korea; Japan
- Original languages: Japanese; Korean
- No. of seasons: 1
- No. of episodes: 8

Production
- Running time: 60 minutes (Youtube, Hulu); 30 minutes (Nippon TV)
- Production companies: Hulu Japan; Hybe Labels Japan

Original release
- Network: Hulu Japan and Nippon TV (Japan); YouTube (all other regions)
- Release: July 9 – September 3, 2022

Related
- I-Land

&Audition – The Howling – is a Japanese and South Korean reality competition program that follows the formation and debut of the first boy group under Hybe Labels Japan.

In the live finale on September 3, 2022, the nine members of &TEAM were revealed. They debuted on December 7, 2022.

== Program synopsis ==
&Audition – The Howling – A 60-minute, uncut version of the show where 15 trainees move forward together towards their dreams; a documentary-style program where various performances and stories unfold as they aim for debut.

- Hulu Japan (Japan), Hybe Labels YouTube (Global): every Saturday at 1:30PM JST starting on July 9, 2022 (Episodes 1–7)

&Audition – The Howling – Final Round

- Hybe Labels YouTube (Global), Hulu Japan (Japan): 4PM JST live broadcast from Tokyo on September 3, 2022 (Episode 8); two-hour special
- Nippon TV (Japan): 4-5PM JST; one-hour special

&Audition – Live – A shorter 30-minute version of the show, serving as support to the main broadcast, where MCs and an audience watch together with viewers.

- Nippon TV (Japan): 12:59AM every Thursday starting on July 14, 2022

== Background ==
On January 1, 2021, it was announced that Big Hit Japan would launch the "Big Hit Japan Global Debut Project" to search for artists to debut as a group in Japan and become active worldwide. Former I-Land contestants K, Nicholas, EJ and Taki were to take part as confirmed members of the group, joined by additional trainees determined through an audition program called "&Audition".

On March 19, Big Hit Entertainment re-branded and re-structured into Hybe Corporation, whereby Hybe Labels Japan would now be involved in the program and group's debut. On the same day, an official Twitter account under the name "&AUDITION Boys" was launched for the four confirmed group members. On April 26, 2021, K and EJ made a cameo in the music video for Enhypen's "Drunk-Dazed". On November 4, Hybe Labels Japan shared that the &Audition program would begin airing in 2022.

On January 18, 2022, Hybe Labels Japan announced the opening of YouTube channel "&Audition Boys", and various videos and vlogs were uploaded. On March 9, the program was revealed to be titled &Audition – The Howling, and broadcast would start in July 2022 as the first phase of the Global Debut Project. On May 30, the program's official website and social media accounts were opened, as well as the details of its broadcast date. On June 4, themed profile photos of the 15 participating trainees were revealed. The signal song for the program, "The Final Countdown", and its music video were released on June 28.

== Producers ==
Special Advisor

- Bang Si-hyuk

Mentors

- Pdogg
- Son Sung-deuk

Performance Director

- Sakura Inoue

Producer and Sound Director

- Soma Genda

Special Producers

- Ryosuke Imai
- Scooter Braun
- Zico

Producer information from the official &Audition website.

=== Special guests ===
- Enhypen (Episodes 1 and 8)
- Tomorrow X Together (Episode 6)
- Seventeen (Video message; Episodes 3 and 4)
- BTS (Video message; Episode 6)
- RM (Episode 8)

== Contestants ==
Color key:

Final members of &TEAM
Eliminated in the final episode

15 contestants
K (ケイ)	Nicholas (ニコラス)	EJ (ウィジュ)	Taki (タキ)	Jo (ジョウ)
Harua (ハルア)	Maki (マキ)	Yuma (ユウマ)	Fuma (フウマ)	Gaku (ガク)
Hikaru (ヒカル)	Junwon (ジュンウォン)	Hayate (ハヤテ)	Yejun (イェジュン)	Minhyung (ミニョン)

== Profile ==
A total of 15 trainees participated in the show—four confirmed members, who were previously contestants on the South Korean boy group survival reality show I-Land, and 11 new trainees.

	Name	Japanese	Nationality	Prefecture / City	Date of birth	Age	Before &Audition
Debut Trainees	K	ケイ	Japan	Tokyo	21 October 1997	24	Former marathon athlete and I-Land contestant; trained at EXPG Tokyo
Debut Trainees	Nicholas	ニコラス	Taiwan	Taipei	9 July 2002	19	B-boy and former I-Land contestant
Debut Trainees	EJ	ウィジュ	South Korea	Goyang	7 September 2002	19	Former Big Hit Music trainee, fencing athlete and I-Land contestant
Debut Trainees	Taki	タキ	Japan	Kanagawa	4 May 2005	17	Background in locking, former I-Land contestant
Trainees	Fuma	フウマ	Japan	Shizuoka	29 June 1998	23	Dancer, backup dancer, former n.cH trainee until 2019, Produce 101 Japan season 2 contestant (withdrew before program aired in early 2021)
Trainees	Hayate	ハヤテ	Japan	Hyogo	25 January 2001	21	Appeared on JTBC's Stage K in 2019; ModelPress Mr High School Boy contestant in 2017
Trainees	Junwon	ジュンウォン	South Korea	Jeonju	21 April 2003	19	Former Big Hit Music, iMe Korea and Biscuit Entertainment trainee
Trainees	Yuma	ユウマ	Japan	Hyogo	7 February 2004	18	Former Johnny's trainee under Kansai Johnny's Jr from 2012; former Avex trainee
Trainees	Gaku	ガク	Japan	Nagano	25 April 2004	18	Dance and dance battle background
Trainees	Jo	ジョウ	Japan	Kanagawa	8 July 2004	17	Junon Superboy Contest 2020 finalist, dropped out before finals presumably to become a trainee; basketball player
Trainees	Hikaru (Haku)	ヒカル	Japan	Gunma	28 March 2005	17	Ballet background; 2020 Japan Seifuku School Uniform Award winner
Trainees	Harua	ハルア	Japan	Nagano	1 May 2005	17	Formerly signed to Stardust Promotion new talent division
Trainees	Maki	マキ	Japan / Germany	Tokyo	17 February 2006	16	Musical theatre background; previously part of a musical theatre company
Trainees	Minhyung	ミニョン	South Korea	Seoul	27 January 2007	15	Former Big Hit Music trainee
Trainees	Yejun	イェジュン	South Korea	Seoul	28 April 2007	15	Former Big Hit Music trainee, child actor; appeared in Weightlifting Fairy Kim Bok-joo and Arthdal Chronicles

Note: Profile information from the official &Audition website, and ages based on the international age system and date of release (June 2022).

== Concept ==
Each round has a mission involving both an interim check and a performance. The trainees will be judged on vocal ability, performance and a special criteria that will change with each round. Based on evaluations of their performances, the trainees earn a certain number of &BALLs to fill the &RING. Only if they fill the &RING after four rounds can everyone advance to the final round; if they fail to fill the &RING, the planned group's debut may be cancelled.

== Episodes ==
No.	Title	Original release date
1	"Episode 1"	July 9, 2022
&Audition – The Howling is first introduced by Bang Si-hyuk as a project in which debut trainees K, Nicholas, EJ and Taki will be joined by newly selected members to debut as Hybe Labels Japan's first boy group. The show begins with the four meeting Enhypen and then the other 11 trainees. All are then presented with their first task, the "Signal Song Mission". The meanings of &BALL and &RING are revealed and the episode documents the trials and hardships the trainees face while practicing for their first performance as a group.
2	"Episode 2"	July 16, 2022
The second mission is the "Concept Mission". The songs are revealed and the trainees are divided into different teams, each group being led by one debut trainee. EJ's team receives a disappointing feedback in the interim check; they also travel to Busan and go to a seiro-mushi restaurant before their performance to spend time off and discuss ways to improve.
3	"Episode 3"	July 23, 2022
Team Nicholas re-charge at an ocean-side grilled eel restaurant while K's team visit a night market in Busan and try various street food. Team K meets a hurdle as a member is unable to participate and they must re-practice with new formations and positions days before the final performance. Nicholas' team show a powerful performance, while Taki's team challenge a performance involving modern dance. Seventeen makes an appearance to reveal the trainees' third mission.
4	"Episode 4"	July 30, 2022
After the mission for Round 3 is revealed, the 15 trainees get together in their teams to practice. They must pick a leader and choose a team name. The groups work together through practice and interim checks while getting closer. Seventeen delivers a special mission to the trainees where there will be a "variety contest" to give them a chance to earn additional &BALLs. The trainees go outdoors to a lodge where they open up to each other and talk about what has been on their minds. They also receive surprise special messages from afar.
5	"Episode 5"	August 6, 2022
Round 3 shows the trainee teams as they make their through an interim check at a special venue, rehearsals and a final performance, set on a stage that is larger than they anticipated. The trainees are tasked with completing the Seventeen Legendary Mission, covering three songs which they must also self-choreograph. In contrast to other rounds, the trainees learn that the number of &BALLs they receive will be announced live after each performance in the presence of the producers and other trainees.
6	"Episode 6"	August 13, 2022
The trainees learn about their progress filling &RING and the mission for Round 4, the BTS mission. They look over the songs at their dorm, which is shown for the first time. Days later, a surprise mission is announced, and only the winning team will receive a benefit. Tomorrow X Together visits with advice for the winning team, and the trainees have a meal together. After the interim check, the trainees hear a shocking announcement about the &BALLs they will receive. On the day of performances, BTS sends a special message of support.
7	"Episode 7"	August 20, 2022
Round 4 begins, and unlike previous missions, each team must prepare two performances; one focused on vocals, and the other on dance. If they cannot earn enough &BALLs in this round, the trainees will not be able advance to the final round. The trainees practice and receive interim evaluations before performing. They discover whether they can completely fill the &RING. At the end, they find out how many members will be in the final lineup. There is an announcement about how the debut group will be decided and the live broadcast details for the final episode.
8	"Final Round"	September 3, 2022
The trainees perform two newly revealed songs for the final round, as well as "The Final Countdown" together for the last time. Producers, special producers and guests give encouragement and advice. The debut members are announced, and their group name is revealed by Bang Si-hyuk.

== Missions ==
=== Round 1: Group signal song mission ===
- Episode 1

All trainees perform the theme song "The Final Countdown" together. The special criterion is teamwork.

Minhyung was unable to participate.

=== Round 2: Concept mission ===
- Episodes 2 and 3

K, EJ, Nicholas and Taki all become leaders to four teams and prepare performances with four different concepts. The special criterion is each team's chemistry.

Junwon was unable to participate for health reasons.

Episode	Song	Team Leader	Team Members
2	TXT－"Blue Hour (Japanese ver.)"	EJ	Fuma, Harua, Yejun
3	Monsta X－"Hero (Japanese ver.)"	Nicholas	Gaku, Hayate
3	TVXQ－"Something (Japanese ver.)"	K	Jo, Minhyung
3	Taemin－"Sayonara Hitori"	Taki	Maki, Hikaru, Yuma

=== Round 3: Seventeen legendary mission ===
- Episodes 4 and 5

The trainees split into three teams and perform songs by Seventeen. They are tasked with creating original choreography, interpreting the songs in their own styles, and contributing to the design of their stage outfits. The special criterion is creativity.

Episode	Song	Group Name	Team Leader	Team Members
5	"Call Call Call!"	C Riders	Fuma	Nicholas, Junwon, Minhyung, Yejun
5	"Home;Run (Japanese Ver.)"	Full Count	Gaku	EJ, Jo, Harua, Maki
5	"Oh My! (Japanese Ver.)"	Wang Wang	Hayate	K, Taki, Hikaru, Yuma

=== Round 4: BTS mission ===
- Episodes 6 and 7

The trainees are divided into two teams. Each team is tasked with performing two BTS songs, one of which is a different arrangement to the original. The fourth round has two evaluations: one centered on vocals, and another solely on performance.

Episode	Vocal Song	Performance Song Remix	Team	Trainees
7	"Film Out"	"Run"	A	Nicholas, EJ, Harua, Hayate, Jo, Junwon, Yuma
7	"Lights"	"Black Swan"	B	K, Taki, Fuma, Gaku, Hikaru, Maki, Minhyung, Yejun

=== Final round ===
- Episode 8

Junwon performed "Running with the Pack" while seated due to injury.

Episode	Original Song	Debut Trainees	Trainees
8	"Melody"	K, Nicholas, EJ, Taki	Gaku, Yejun, Harua, Hayate, Hikaru
8	"Running with the Pack"	K, Nicholas, EJ, Taki	Fuma, Jo, Junwon, Maki, Minhyung, Yuma

== Final results ==
K, Nicholas, EJ and Taki's debut was officially confirmed after Round 4. The remaining five members were decided by a combination of criteria: producer evaluation (40%), special producer evaluation (30%), preliminary global voting (20%), and final live voting (10%).

=== Result ===
The finale was broadcast live on September 3, 2022, from Tokyo. Bang Si-hyuk announced the name of the newly formed boy group to be &Team.

Episode 8
#	Name	Nationality
N/A	K	Japan
N/A	Nicholas	Taiwan
N/A	EJ	South Korea
N/A	Taki	Japan
1	Jo	Japan
2	Harua	Japan
3	Maki	Japan / Germany
4	Yuma	Japan
5	Fuma	Japan

== Discography ==
=== Singles ===
Title	Year	Peak positions	Album
Title	Year	JPN	Album
"The Final Countdown"	2022	—	Non-album single
"Melody"	2022	—	Non-album single
"Running with the Pack"	2022	—	Non-album single

== Aftermath ==
- &TEAM officially debuted on December 7, 2022, with the extended play First Howling: Me.
- On November 21, 2022, &Team released their debut song, "Under the Skin" and released their debut extended play on December 7, 2022.
Other contestants
- Some trainees participated in other survival shows:
  - Yoo Jun-won participated in MBC's Fantasy Boys ranked 1st at the finals, and was expected to debut as a member of Fantasy Boys in late 2023 under PocketDol Studio. However, he left the debut lineup on August 23, 2023, following several disagreements Junwon and his parents had with PocketDol Studio regarding his contract.
  - Hikaru & Gaku participated in Oen-High (HYBE Japan Survival Show) as contestants with 9 other members. Hikaru ranked 5 as a fixed member, making him a debut member of aoen, and Gaku ended up making the final lineup ranking 6.
- Some trainees debuted in new groups:
  - Hayate debuted in YK Entertainment under their boy group called Wild Blue.
  - Hikaru & Gaku debuted in JCONIC to their boy group aoen making them &Team's little brothers.
  - Junwon is set to debut in CONTI Inc’s boy group X_ON.
- Some trainees opened social media accounts:
  - Yu Junwon reactivated his Instagram account.
