= Kim Ye-jun =

South Korean child actor

- Born: April 28, 2007 (age 19); Seoul, South Korea
- Other name: Kim Ye-joon
- Occupation: Actor
- Years active: 2013–present

Korean name
- Hangul: 김예준
- Hanja: 金藝俊
- RR: Gim Yejun
- MR: Kim Yejun

Kim Ye-jun (Korean: 김예준; born April 28, 2007), is a South Korean teenaged actor. He is known for his roles in Misaeng: Incomplete Life, Weightlifting Fairy Kim Bok-joo, The Rebel, Secret Mother and Arthdal Chronicles. He is also known for participating in Hybe Labels Japan's reality show &AUDITION - The Howling.

== Filmography ==
=== Films ===
Year	Title	Role
2015	The Chosen: Forbidden Cave	young Jin-myung
2015	The Tiger	young Seok
2015	The Magician	Child guide
2017	One Day	Choi Ji-ho
2017	A Day	Haru

=== TV series ===
Year	Title	Role	Notes	Ref.
2014	Misaeng: Incomplete Life	young Jang Geu-rae		
2015	Kill Me, Heal Me	young Oh Ri-on		
2015	Who Are You: School 2015	young Gong Tae-kwang		
2015	Mom	young Kim Kang-jae		
2015	Six Flying Dragons	Child Yi Bang-won		
2016	Wanted	Kim Han-sol		
2016	Weightlifting Fairy Kim Bok-joo	young Jung Joon-hyung		
2017	The Rebel	young Jo Soo-hak		
2017	Suspicious Partner	Kim Jae-hong		
2017	Circle	young Kim Beom-gyun		
2017	Mad Dog	Choi Joo-won		
2017	Oh, the Mysterious	young Scab		
2018	Let's Hold Hands Tightly and Watch The Sunset	Heo Sung-gu		
2018	Secret Mother	Han Min-joon		
2019	Arthdal Chronicles	young Eun-seom / Saya		
2019	When the Devil Calls Your Name	young Luka Aleksijević		

=== TV shows ===
Year	Title	Role	Notes	Ref.
2022	&Audition – The Howling	Contestant	Finished 10th	
