= Take Me, I'm Yours =

Japanese television series

- Japanese: 私をもらって
- Genre: Fantasy; Romance; Drama; Comedy
- Based on: Take Me, I'm Yours by RoseBean
- Written by: Yuko Shimoda; Shu Honda; Keita Meguro; Izumi Takahashi
- Directed by: Chihiro Ikeda; Yukiko Mishima; Ryûsuke Kurahashi; Yutaka Tsunemachi
- Composer: Koyama Erina
- Country of origin: Japan
- Original language: Japanese
- No. of seasons: 3
- No. of episodes: 19

Production
- Running time: 23 minutes

Original release
- Network: Hulu Japan; NTV
- Release: July 6, 2024 – February 14, 2025

Take Me, I'm Yours (Japanese: 私をもらって, Hepburn: Watashi wo Moratte) is a Japanese drama television series starring Maeda Goki and Kubota Sayu. It is based on a South Korean novel and 2018–2020 webtoon of the same English name (Korean: 날 가져요), by RoseBean and One Punch Rabbit. The Japanese series is directed by Chihiro Ikeda, Yukiko Mishima, Ryûsuke Kurahashi and Yutaka Tsunemachi.

The first season was released on Hulu Japan on July 6, 2024. The second season was released on Aug 31, 2024. The third season was released on January 31, 2025.

== Cast ==
Main

- Gōki Maeda as Ichijo Ryouei
- Kubota Sayu as Morikawa Natsumi

Supporting

- K (&Team) as Grim Reaper
- Louis Kurihara as Ikegami Takuya
- Masaki Reiya as Hagiwara Motohiro
- Tezuka Mai as Ichijo Kanae
- Sakihi Miyu as Uchimura Mari
- Yoshikura Aoi as Sakamoto Miyabi
- Yamaguchi Daichi as Motoki Koji
- Kobayashi Hiroto as Takahashi Keigo
- Takahashi You as Su-san
- Kenji Mizuhashi as Miyamoto Masanori
- Tajima Ryo as Kudo Ryuki
- Reiko Kataoka as Morikawa Yumi
- Hizuki Hana as Leader Grim Reaper

== Episodes ==
Season		Episodes	Originally released
1	Take Me: Memory Arc	8	Jul 6, 2024
2	Take Me: Romance Arc	8	Aug 31, 2024
3	Take Me: Encounter Arc	3	Jan 31, 2025

=== Season 1 ===
No. overall	Episode	Written by	Directed by	Original release date
1	1	Yuko Shimoda	Chihiro Ikeda	July 6, 2024
2	2	Yuko Shimoda	Chihiro Ikeda	July 13, 2024
3	3	Yuko Shimoda	Chihiro Ikeda	July 20, 2024
4	4	Shu Honda & Yuko Shimoda	Yutaka Tsunemachi	July 27, 2024
5	5	Keita Meguro	Yutaka Tsunemachi	August 3, 2024
6	6	Keita Meguro	Yutaka Tsunemachi	August 17, 2024
7	7	Yuko Shimoda	Yutaka Tsunemachi	August 24, 2024
8	9	Yuko Shimoda	Yutaka Tsunemachi	August 31, 2024

=== Season 2 ===
No. overall	Episode	Written by	Directed by	Original release date
9	1	Keita Meguro	Yutaka Tsunemachi	August 31, 2024
10	2	Keita Meguro	Yutaka Tsunemachi	September 7, 2024
11	3	Yuko Shimoda & Izumi Takahashi	Yukiko Mishima	September 14, 2024
12	4	Yuko Shimoda & Izumi Takahashi	Yukiko Mishima	September 21, 2024
13	5	Yuko Shimoda & Izumi Takahashi	Yukiko Mishima	September 28, 2024
14	6	Yuko Shimoda, Keita Meguro & Izumi Takahashi	Ryûsuke Kurahashi	October 5, 2024
15	7	Izumi Takahashi & Keita Meguro	Yutaka Tsunemachi	October 12, 2024
16	8	Izumi Takahashi & Keita Meguro	Yutaka Tsunemachi	October 19, 2024

=== Season 3 ===
No. overall	Episode	Written and Directed by	Original release date
17	1	Chihiro Ikeda	January 31, 2025
18	2	Chihiro Ikeda	February 7, 2025
19	3	Chihiro Ikeda	February 14, 2025
