= K (Japanese singer) =

Japanese singer, dancer and actor (born 1997)

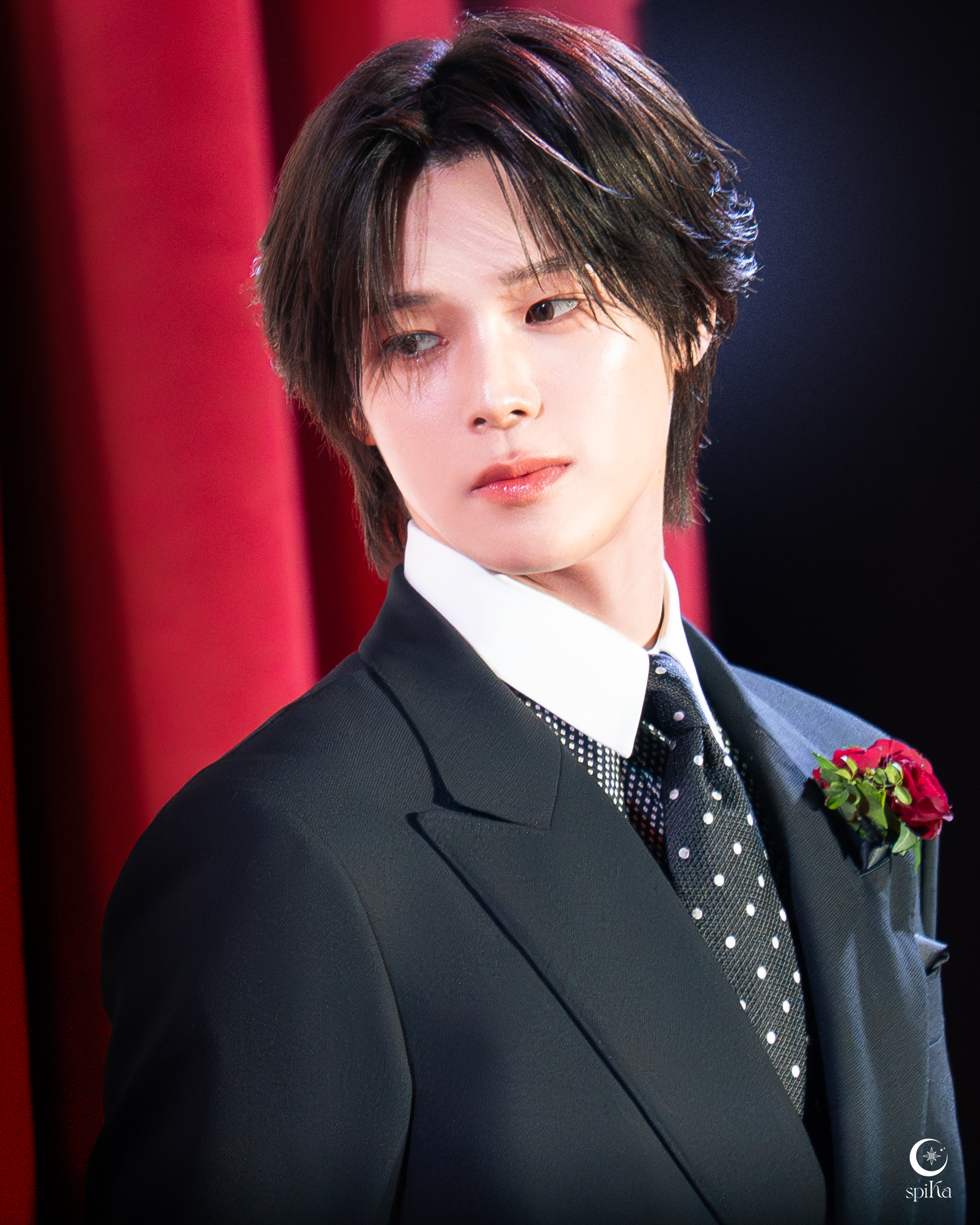
- K in 2026

Background information
- Born: 古賀祐大（Koga Yudai） October 21, 1997 (age 29); Tokyo, Japan
- Occupations: Singer; dancer; actor
- Years active: 2020–present
- Musical career
- Genres: J-pop; K-pop
- Instrument: Vocals
- Label: YX Labels
- Member of: &Team

Koga Yudai (古賀祐大), known by his stage name K (Japanese: ケイ, Korean: 케이, born October 21, 1997 in Tokyo) is a Japanese singer, dancer, and actor. He debuted in 2022 as a member of the boy group &Team under YX Labels. Prior to his idol career, K was an elite competitive long-distance and ekiden runner.

== Career ==
In 2017, K enrolled in the artist training school EXPG in Tokyo. In 2019, he participated under his birth name in the audition program Deep Vocalist Audition: Road to D, a program recruiting new members for the LDH Japan vocal group Deep.

K studied dance in Los Angeles, where he saw a BTS performance on TV and decided to join their agency Big Hit.

In June 2020, K participated in the Mnet idol survival competition program I-Land, produced by Big Hit Entertainment (now Hybe) and CJ ENM. After making it to the finale, K was eliminated in the final episode of I-Land.

On January 1, 2021, it was announced that K had been selected as one of five confirmed members for the global debut project of Big Hit Entertainment Japan's (later Hybe Japan and YX Labels). The other selected performers had also been eliminated from I-Land.

From July to September 2022, K appeared in &Audition – The Howling –, the reality competition program to select members for Hybe's first Japanese group. K debuted as a member of &Team on December 7, 2022.

In the October 2023 episode of All-Star Thanksgiving, K won the mini marathon. In March 2024, K collaborated with hip-hop choreographer Rie Hata on a dance session sponsored by Toyota. In the April 2024 episode of All-Star Thanksgiving, K took fourth place in the mini marathon; in the October 2024 episode, he placed sixth. In May, he was a tournament supporter for Nippon Television's The Dance Day contest. On July 6, 2024, K made his TV drama series debut in Take Me, I'm Yours, playing the role of a Grim Reaper. In August 2024, K appeared as an entertainment presenter on Mezamashi TV. K was a season regular on Friday episodes of Love it! on TBS from October to December. During Shanghai Fashion Week in October, K appeared at Moncler's "The City of Genius" event.

In January 2025, K served as MC for TV Asahi's Our Emotional Heisei. In May 2025, he became a brand ambassador for the South Korean skincare brand Sam'u. From July to September, K was a season regular on Monday episodes of Love it! on TBS. Also in September, K completed his nine-day duty as a TBS World Athletics supporter for the Tokyo 2025 World Athletics Championships, where was praised for his insightful comments and passionate support. On November 27, he was selected as one of Modelpress's Faces of 2025.

K at the &TEAM showcase "Mark on Me" in Tokyo, September 21, 2026

On January 1, 2026, K was the official tournament supporter and commentator for TBS's New Year Ekiden 2026. On April 6, K was an MC for Meryl Streep and Anne Hathaway's appearance at a promotional event for The Devil Wears Prada 2 in Tokyo. Also in 2026, K appeared in the live-action film Blue Lock in the role of Seishiro Nagi.

== Artistry ==
K regularly contributes to choreography for &Team's stage performances, possessing the position of "performance leader" in the group.

=== Choreography credits ===
| Artist | Songs | Album / EP / Single |
2023
| &Team | "Buzz Love" | First Howling: ME |
| &Team | "Firework" | First Howling: WE |
| &Team | "Really Crazy" | First Howling: NOW |
2024
| &Team | "Samidare" | Yukiakari |
| &Team | "Big Suki" | "Jyuugoya" |
| &Team | "Deer Hunter" | Yukiakari |
2025
| &Team | "Run Wild" | "Go in Blind" |
| &Team | "Lunatic" | Back to Life |

== Personal life ==
He started playing football and track and field in elementary school and belonged to a strong high school team for ekiden (long-distance relay races). Although he had already been accepted to university, he decided to give up track and field and pursue a career as an artist.

== Filmography ==
=== Film ===
- Blue Lock (2026) – Seishiro Nagi

=== Television series ===
- I-Land (2020) – contestant
- &Audition – The Howling (2022) – confirmed debut contestant
- Take Me, I'm Yours (私をもらって; 2024–2025) – Grim Reaper (Shinigami)

== Competition results ==
| Year | Tournament name | Event | Result | Ref |
Ninoe Junior High School, Edogawa
| 2010 | Tokyo Metropolitan Junior High School Regional Track and Field Championships | Men 1500m | 3rd place (4 m 49.04 s) | |
| 2011 | Edogawa Junior High School Track and Field Championships | Men 1500m | 2nd place | |
| 2012 | The 63rd Tokyo Metropolitan Junior High School Regional Tournament - District Division | Men 3000m | 7th place (9 m 42.57 s) | |
| 2012 | The 58th All Japan Junior High School Track and Field Championships Tokyo Metropolitan Tournament | Men 3000m Men 1500m | 32 place (9 m 34.66 s) 36 place (4 m 25.19 s) | |
| 2012 | The 65th Tokyo Metropolitan Junior High School Ekiden Race | _ | Team 3d pl (1 h 1 m 11 s) (Section 5: 10 m 07 s) | |
Ryutsu Keizai University Kashiwa High School
| 2015 | Chiba Prefecture High School Athletic Meet | Men 3000m steeplechase | Qualifying: 9 m 39.49 s Final: 15th place (10 m 12.50 s) | |
| 2015 | The 57th Oga Ekiden Race | _ | 1st place in team competition (2 h 08 m 27 s) (Section 2: 9 m 09 s) | |
