= Aoen =

Japanese boy band

Aoen アオエン
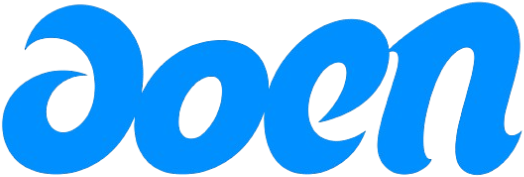
- Logo

Background information
- Genre: J-pop
- Years active: 2025–present
- Label: Jconic
- Members: Yuju; Ruka; Gaku; Hikaru; Sota; Kyosuke; Reo
- Website: aoen-official.jp

Aoen (Japanese: アオエン, stylized in all lowercase) is a Japanese boy band managed by Jconic. The group is composed of seven members: Yuju, Ruka, Gaku, Hikaru, Sota, Kyosuke, and Reo. They were formed through the reality-survival program Oen-High. Aoen released their debut single "The Blue Sun" on June 11, 2025.

== History ==
=== 2023–2025: Pre-debut activities and formation ===
On September 24, 2023, Hybe Labels Japan announced their upcoming boy group through the opening of their official social media accounts on various platforms under the tentative name 24kumi (24組). By mid 2024, the group went inactive and was ultimately disbanded.

On February 2, 2025, Hybe Labels Japan announced the launch of a new project to form a next-generation J-Pop boy group. To achieve this, an audition program titled Oen-High would air starting February 15, 2025. The eight members previously introduced as 24kumi were revealed to be contestants on this show.

On April 4, it was announced that the group produced by Oen-High would be called Aoen, with the name being a combination of "Ao" (青; 'blue') and "en" (炎; 'flame'. It holds the meaning of "a passionate run that fills the world with blue, the color of the hottest flame", and symbolizes the world's hottest flame burning inside the group's heart while they work energetically and support everyone.

Through Oen-High, five members were chosen through the results of their stage performances and two members were chosen through a public fan voting, making the team a seven-member group. During Oen-High's finale on April 12, the first five members of the debut team were announced. Kyosuke ranked first overall, followed by Yuju, Sota, Ruka and Hikaru respectively. The results of the public fan voting were announced during a live broadcast of Nippon TV's show DayDay. on April 23, 2025. Gaku and Reo ranked sixth and seventh overall respectively therefore completing the lineup of Aoen. The same day, the group's fandom name was also announced to be "aoring".

=== 2025: Debut with The Blue Sun, "Seishun Incredibles" ===
On April 24, 2025, it was announced that Aoen would debut with their first single album The Blue Sun on June 11. The group held a debut announcement press conference the same day. "Finish Line ~Last Race, New Start~" and "The Blue Sun" were pre-released on May 16 and June 2, respectively. Aoen released their third Japanese digital single, "Seishun Incredibles", on October 15.

=== 2026–present: Transfer of agency and Instant Crush ===
On January 5, 2026, Hybe Japan announced that the group was transferred to Jconic, a new record label established on January 1, as part of the restructuring of Hybe Japan's multi-label system.

Aoen's second single album, Instant Crush (秒で落ちた), was released on March 18, 2026.

On April 12, it was announced that aoen would release their fourth digital single "Youth", on April 15. On April 23, hey began their first tour, titled aoen LIVE TOUR 2026 ～The Beginning of Blue 47+1~.

On May 22, aoen announced their third single album "Hajimari Color", set for release on July 22.

On June 7, aoen announced that they will be releasing an English version of "Youth", the following day.

On July 7, aoen release their digital single "Hajimari Color" (ハジマリColor) as the pre-release their third single album.

== Members ==
- Yuju (優樹) — leader
- Ruka (琉楓) — sub-leader
- Gaku (雅久)
- Hikaru (輝)
- Sota (颯太)
- Kyosuke (京助)
- Reo (礼央)

== Discography ==
=== Singles ===
List of singles as lead artist with selected chart positions and sales, showing year released, certification and album name
Title	Year	Peak chart positions		Sales	Certifications	Album
Title	Year	JPN	JPN Hot	Sales	Certifications	Album
"The Blue Sun" (青い太陽)	2025	3	6	JPN: 78,939 (phy.)	RIAJ: Gold (phy.)	TBA
"Instant Crush" (秒で落ちた)	2026	3	8	JPN: 75,711 (phy.)	RIAJ: Gold (phy.)	TBA
"Hajimari Color" (ハジマリColor)	2026	3	7	JPN: 63,712 (phy.)		TBA
"—" denotes releases that did not chart or were not released in that region.

=== Digital singles ===
List of digital singles, with selected chart positions, showing year released, sales, and album name
Title	Year	Peak chart positions		Album
Title	Year	JPN	JPN Hot	Album
"Finish Line ~Last Race, New Start~" (FINISH LINE 〜終わりと始まりの〜)	2025	—	—	
"The Blue Sun" (青い太陽)	2025	—	—	
"Seishun Incredibles" (青春インクレディブル)	2025	—	—	
"Hajimari Color" (ハジマリColor)	2026			
"—" denotes releases that did not chart or were not released in that region.

=== Soundtrack appearances ===
List of soundtrack appearances, with selected chart positions, showing year released and album name
Title	Year	Peak chart positions	Album
Title	Year	JPN Hot	Album
"MXMM"	2025		Your Divorce Is Served! OST
"Youth"	2026		Beyblade X OST
"—" denotes releases that did not chart or were not released in that region.

== Filmography ==
=== Reality programs ===
Year	Title	Network	Notes	Ref.
2025	Oen-High 〜 The Starting Line of Dreams 〜	YouTube, Hulu Japan, Nippon TV	Survival show featuring trainees aiming to become aoen members; eight episodes.	

== Videography ==
=== Music videos ===
Year	Song Title	Director(s)	Ref.
2025	"The Blue Sun"	Watanabe Masaki (maxilla)	
2025	"Blue Flame"	te2ta (NEiGHBOR FLOW)	
2025	"Seishun Incredibles"	Okawa Shin	
2025	"MXMM"	Fujimoto Moeyo	
2026	"Instant Crush"	Takaya Ohata (isai Inc.)	
2026	"Hajimari color"		

== Live performances ==
=== Concert and tours ===
aoen LIVE TOUR 2026 ～The Beginning of Blue 47+1~
Date	City	Venue	Ref.
April 24	Tokyo	Ebisu The Garden Hall	
April 27	Okinawa	Drive	
April 29	Tokushima	Club GRINDHOUSE	
April 30	Kagawa	Takamatsu MONSTER	
May 2	Ehime	Matsuyama W studio RED	
May 3	Kochi	CARAVAN SARY	
May 7	Ishikawa	Kanazawa EIGHT HALL	
May 9	Fukui	CHOP	
May 10	Toyama	MAIRO	
May 13	Nagano	NAGANO CLUB JUNK BOX	
May 14	Niigata	Golden Pigs Red Stage	
May 18	Kagoshima	Caparvo Hall	
May 19	Miyazaki	LAZARUS	
May 21	Oita	DRUM Be-0	
May 23	Fukuoka	DRUM LOGOS	
May 24	Kumamoto	B.9 V1	
May 26	Saga	GEILS	
May 27	Nagasaki	DRUM Be-7	
June 10	Akita	Akita Club Swindle	
June 11	Aomori	Aomori Quarter	
June 15	Iwate	Morioka Club Change WAVE	
June 16	Miyagi	Sendai Rensa	
June 18	Fukushima	Koriyama HIPSHOT JAPAN	
June 19	Yamagata	Yamagata Music Showa Session	
September 6	Gunma	CLUB Jammers	
September 12	Yamanashi	Kofu CONVICTION	
September 21	Shimane	Matsue Canova	
September 22	Tottori	Yonago laughs	
September 23	Okayama	CRAZYMAMA KINGDOM	
September 25	Hiroshima	LIVE VANQUISH	
September 27	Yamaguchi	Shunan RISING HALL	
October 3	Tochigi	HEAVEN'S ROCK Utsunomiya VJ-2	
October 10	Chiba	Kashiwa PALOOZA	
October 12	Hokkaido	Sapporo Chikamatsu	
October 17	Kanagawa	FAD YOKOHAMA	
October 18	Saitama	HEAVEN'S ROCK Saitama Shintoshin VJ-3	
October 23	Aichi	Nagoya Bottom Line	
October 24	Mie	Yokkaichi CLUB ROOTS	
October 25	Gifu	Gifu CLUB ROOTS	
October 30	Ibaraki	Mito LIGHT HOUSE	
October 31	Shizuoka	LIVE ROXY SHIZUOKA	
November 14	Wakayama	Wakayama SHELTER	
November 15	Nara	Nara EVANS CASTLE HALL	
November 17	Hyogo	Kobe Chicken George	
November 18	Kyoto	KYOTO MUSE	
November 20	Shiga	Shiga U★STONE	
November 22	Osaka	Orix Theater	
December 26	Tokyo	Tokyo Garden Theater	

=== Other events ===
Year	Event	Venue	City	Country	Ref.
2025	41st Mynavi Tokyo Girls Collection 2025 AUTUMN/WINTER	Saitama Super Arena	Saitama	Japan	
2026	Mynavi Presents The Performance	K-Arena Yokohama	Yokohama	Japan	
2026	Weverse Con Festival	Olympic Park - KSPO Dome y 88 Lawn Field	Seoul	South Korea	
