= Back to Life (EP) =

EP by &Team
- Released: October 28, 2025
- Length: 18:12
- Language: Korean
- Label: YX Labels
- Producers: "Hitman" Bang; Thom Bridges; Mick Coogan; Scotty Dittrich; Dwilly; Soma Genda; Julia Lewis; Pete Nappi; Robert Norberg; Tyler Spry; Anders Wigelius

&Team chronology
Go in Blind (2025)	Back to Life (2025)	We on Fire (2026)

Singles from Back to Life
- 1. "Back to Life" Released: October 27, 2025

Back to Life is the fourth extended play (EP) and first Korean-language release of Japanese boy band &Team. It was released on October 28, 2025, by YX Labels. Back to Life was &Team's Korean debut; they debuted in Japan in 2022. The EP was a commercial success, becoming a million-seller in both Japan and South Korea.

== Background ==
&Team debuted in December 2022 under Hybe Labels Japan (later YX Labels) after being created in September 2022. &Team is the first "global group" of South Korean entertainment company Hybe, developed under the company's "multi-home, multi-genre" strategy. Back to Life was preceded by the 2025 EP Go in Blind; the lead single "Go in Blind" became the group's first Recording Industry Association of Japan million-seller.

&Team's plans to debut in South Korea with the mini-album Back to Life were announced in September 2025, at their third anniversary celebration. At the event, the message "Japan to Global Next Chapter" was displayed; &Team's Korean debut is part of Hybe's and the group's global expansion efforts.

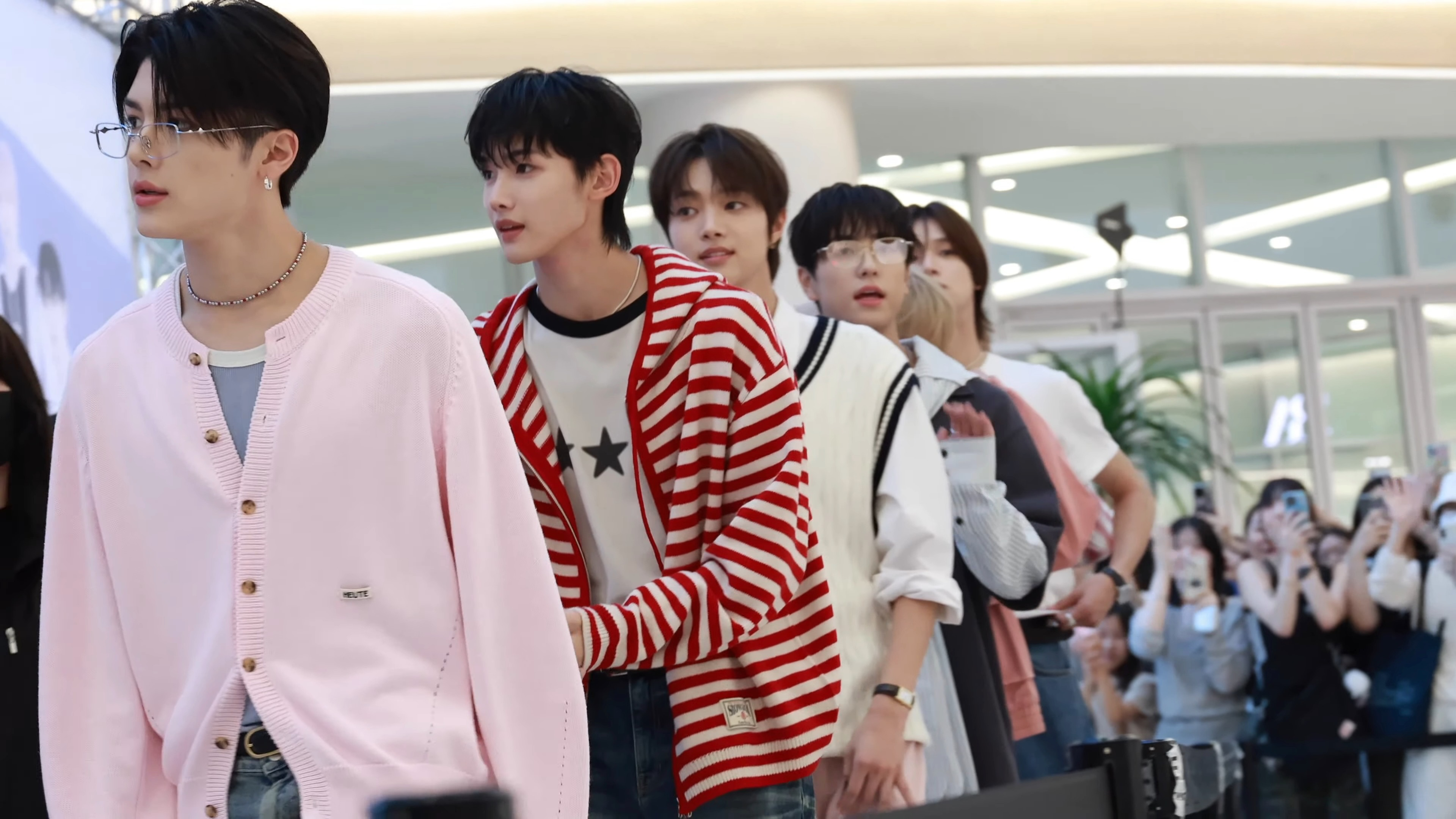
&Team at a fan event in Seoul in August 2024, prior to their official Korean debut

Prior to their Korean debut, &Team's activities in the country included concerts, fan events, and televised performances of Korean versions of their Japanese songs. In June 2025, they performed a sold-out concert at Jamsil Arena in Seoul. Members had expressed their desire for an official Korean debut, and described it as an important goal they had been working towards for several years. In an interview prior to the release of Back to Life, &Team member Harua said:

Before, it felt like an artist based in Japan appearing briefly on a Korean stage. Now it's about showing ourselves properly in Korea — and the audience will see it differently. The responsibility to "prove it with skill" is heavier. We've worked hard for three years, but I'm treating this as another beginning.

EJ, &Team's leader and only South Korean member, said he was surprised when he learned about the Korean debut plans.

== Music and lyrics ==
Back to Life continues the werewolf-themed concept of &Team's prior releases. The album incorporates aspects of the K-pop, rock, hip-hop, and R&B genres. The title track "Back to Life" is a powerful rock and hip-hop song. "Lunatic" is a 2000s-era hip-hop track; American music journalist Jeff Benjamin noted the song's similarity to N.E.R.D.'s "Lapdance". "Mismatch" is a "playful love song" with a 1990s R&B groove. "Rush" is a "high-octane" experimental pop and hip-hop track that features strong vocals. The final two tracks, "Heartbreak Time Machine" and "Who am I", are ballads. "Heartbreak Time Machine" is a somber rock ballad, while "Who am I" is a mid-tempo ballad with introspective lyrics and "moving synthesizer production".

== Release ==
Back to Life was released in South Korea on October 28, 2025, distributed by YG Plus. The album was released in Japan on October 29, with distribution by YX Labels. Accompanied by concept photos, three package versions of Back to Life were released. Titled "breath", "gaze", and "roar", each version has a distinct visual style. The title track "Back to Life" was pre-released on October 27 alongside its music video. The Japanese-language version of "Back to Life" was released on November 28.

Following the release of the "Back to Life" music video on October 27, a choreography-focused performance video was released on October 30. The music video for "Lunatic" was released on November 4, and a performance video for "Mismatch" was released on December 7.

== Promotion ==
Beginning on October 2, 2025, the six-part docuseries &Team 100日密着: Howling Out to the World aired weekly on Nippon Television. The series was also available via Hulu Japan, TVer, and YouTube. The program chronicles the group's journey leading up to their Korean debut. The official release of the album was preceded by concept clips, a track sampler, and a highlight medley. To promote the album in Seoul, a large "claw mark" advertisement was plastered on Hybe's headquarters, and advertisements were displayed at Namsan Seoul Tower, Gimpo International Airport, the Hyundai Seoul department store, and in the subway system.

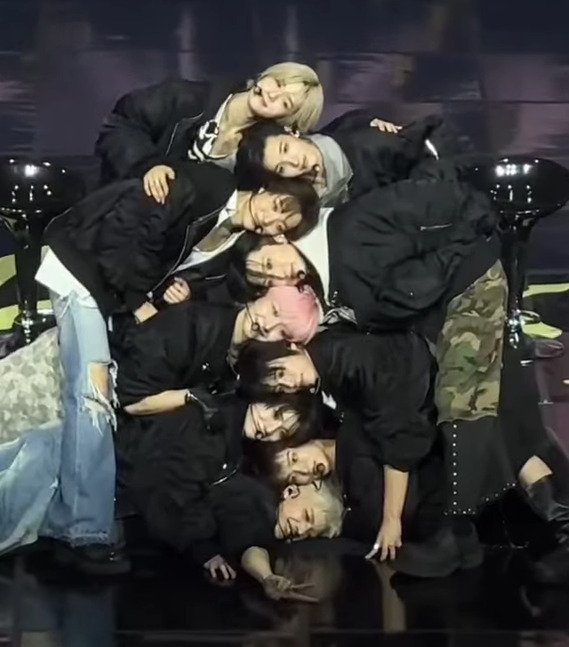
&Team at the fan showcase for Back to Life on October 28

On October 28, 2025, the day of the EP's release, &Team hosted a showcase for local media at the Blue Square in Seoul. Real Sound reported that nearly 100 reporters attended the showcase, which was hosted by Shin A-young. At the event, &Team performed "Back to Life" and "Lunatic", the latter of which was partially choreographed by &Team member K. At a fan showcase held that evening, &Team performed "Back to Life", "Lunatic", "Mismatch", and "Heartbreak Time Machine"; at the event, it was announced that Back to Life had surpassed 1.1 million copies sold on the day of its release. The fan showcase was also live-streamed via Weverse, Hybe's YouTube channel, and &Team's TikTok account.

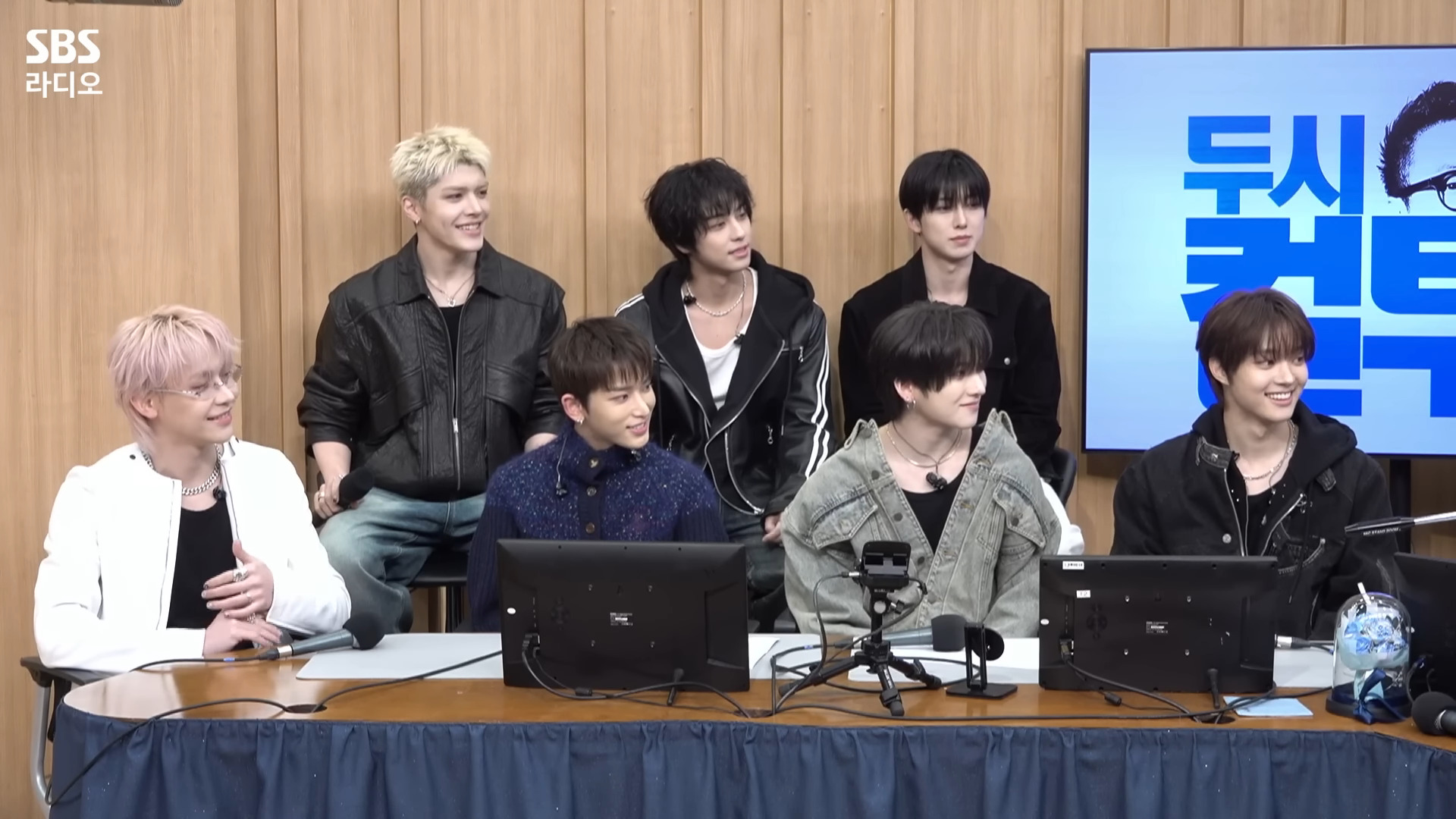
&Team participating in an interview for SBS Radio while promoting Back to Life

From October 28 to November 4, a Back to Life promotional pop-up shop was set up in Seongsu-dong, Seoul. &Team performed the lead single "Back to Life" on South Korean music programs, winning SBS M's The Show, MBC M's Show Champion, and KBS2's Music Bank. They also appeared on South Korean variety shows. &Team also promoted in Japan, performing "Back to Life" on Nippon Television's With Music on November 1. Beginning in mid-November, members K and Jo were absent from some Back to Life promotional activities due to scheduling conflicts.

On November 28, &Team released the Japanese-language version of "Back to Life". Two days later, they held a fan showcase event at Roppongi Hills Arena in Tokyo, performing "Lunatic", "Mismatch", and the Japanese version of "Back to Life". The event, which was hosted by comedian Muga Tsukaji, also commemorated Back to Life's "double-million" achievement, having sold one million copies in both Japan and South Korea.

== Commercial performance ==
Back to Life debuted at number one on Japan's Oricon and South Korea's Circle charts. While many South Korean artists have topped the Oricon chart with their Korean-language releases, Back to Life was the first Korean-language release by a Japanese artist to achieve that feat. Back to Life also charted at number one on the Hanteo Daily Album Chart in South Korea, and all six tracks were listed on South Korean streaming service Melon's "hot 100". With Back to Life, &Team became first Japanese artist to become a million-seller in both Japan and South Korea, achieving both records on the day of the album's release. &Team's preceding single, "Go in Blind", had received its RIAJ million-seller certification about three months after its release.

YX Labels reported that the group's global streaming had greatly increased, with "Back to Life" outperforming "Go in Blind" by 2.4x on Spotify and 3.8x on Apple Music in the United States. &Team placed first on Billboard's Emerging Artists chart for the week of November 29. With 1.3 million units sold, IFPI listed Back to Life at number 13 on its 2025 Global Album Sales Chart.

== Track listing ==
Standard track listing
No.	Title	Writer(s)	Producer(s)	Length
1.	"Back to Life"	Julia Lewis; Tyler Spry; Scotty Dittrich; Mick Coogan; Cho Yun Kyoung; "Hitman" Bang; Soma Genda; Jvde (Galactika *); ChaMane; YX Labels	Lewis; Spry; Dittrich; Coogan; Bang; Genda	3:20
2.	"Lunatic"	Thom Bridges; Rachel West; Genda; Jamil Kazmi; Kona Rose Jackson; Jvde; ChaMane	Bridges	2:36
3.	"Mismatch"	Genda; Parkmoonchi; yoondahye; Lee Seuran; Luke; Yelo; Lara Andersson; Ben Samama; Liam O'Donnell; YX Labels	Genda	3:24
4.	"Rush"	Anders Wigelius; Robert Norberg; Julian Bell; Charlotte Wilson; Jvde; ChaMane	Wigelius; Norberg	3:08
5.	"Heartbreak Time Machine"	Dwilly; Dewain Whitmore, Jr.; Michael Matosic; Lee; YX Labels	Dwilly	3:08
6.	"Who am I"	Jon Robert Hall; Kazmi; Yu Shirota; Genda; Pete Nappi; Jinli (Full8loom); Lee; YX Labels; Jvde; ChaMane	Nappi	2:36
Total length:				18:12

=== Notes ===
- "Mismatch" is stylized in all caps.

== Personnel ==
Credits are adapted from physical album insert and Tidal.

- &Team – vocals (all tracks)
  - Maki – background vocals (tracks 2, 3, 5, 6)
  - Yuma – background vocals (track 3)
- Soma Genda – vocal arrangement (all tracks), digital editing (all tracks), recording engineer (all tracks), keyboard (track 3), synthesizer (track 3), guitar (track 3), bass (track 3), drums (track 3), programming (track 3), background vocals (track 6)
- Chris Gehringer – mastering engineer (all tracks)
- Scotty Dittrich – keyboard (track 1), synthesizer (track 1), guitar (track 1), programming (track 1)
- Julia Lewis – keyboard (track 1), synthesizer (track 1), bass (track 1), drums (track 1), programming (track 1)
- Tyler Spry – synthesizer (track 1), bass (track 1), drums (track 1), programming (track 1)
- Jvde (Galactika *) – background vocals (tracks 1, 4, 6)
- ChaMane – background vocals (tracks 1, 4, 5)
- Mick Coogan – background vocals (track 1)
- Patrizio "Teezio" Pigliapoco – mixing engineer (track 1)
- Emiliano Olocco – mixing engineer (track 1)
- Thom Bridges – keyboard (track 2), synthesizer (track 2), guitar (track 2)
- Rachel West – background vocals (track 2)
- Geoff Swan – mixing engineer (track 2)
- Matt Cahill – assistant mixing engineer (track 2)
- Rob Kinelski – mixing engineer (tracks 3, 6)
- Eli Heisler – assistant mixing engineer (tracks 3, 6)
- Anders Wigelius – keyboard (track 4), synthesizer (track 4), guitar (track 4), bass (track 4), drums (track 4), programming (track 4)
- Robert Norberg – keyboard (track 4), synthesizer (track 4), guitar (track 4), bass (track 4), drums (track 4), programming (track 4)
- Alex Tumay – mixing engineer (track 4)
- Kai Tsao – assistant mixing engineer (track 4)
- Dwilly – keyboard (track 5), synthesizer (track 5), guitar (track 5), bass (track 5), drums (track 5), programming (track 5)
- John Sinclair – mixing engineer (track 5)
- Pete Nappi – keyboard (track 6), synthesizer (track 6), bass (track 6), drums (track 6), programming (track 6)
- Jon Robert Hall – background vocals (track 6)

== Charts ==
=== Weekly charts ===
Weekly chart performance for Back to Life
Chart (2025)	Peak position
Austrian Albums (Ö3 Austria)	59
Belgian Albums (Ultratop Flanders)	148
French Albums (SNEP)	156
Japanese Albums (Oricon)	1
Japanese Hot Albums (Billboard Japan)	1
South Korean Albums (Circle)	1
US Top Album Sales (Billboard)	13
US World Albums (Billboard)	5

=== Monthly charts ===
Monthly chart performance for Back to Life
Chart (2025)	Peak position
Japanese Albums (Oricon)	1
South Korean Albums (Circle)	1

=== Year-end charts ===
Year-end chart performance for Back to Life
Chart (2025)	Peak position
Global Album Sales (IFPI)	10
Japanese Albums (Oricon)	6
South Korean Albums (Circle)	10

== Certifications ==
Certifications for Back to Life
Region	Certification	Certified units/sales
Japan (RIAJ) Physical	3× Platinum	750,000^{^}
South Korea (KMCA)	Million	1,331,733
^{^} Shipments figures based on certification alone.

== Awards and nominations ==
Awards and nominations for Back to Life
Award	Category	Result	Ref.
Golden Disc Award (South Korea)	Album Bonsang	Nominated	
Japan Gold Disc Award	Best 5 Albums (Japanese)	Won	
