= &Team =

Japanese boy group

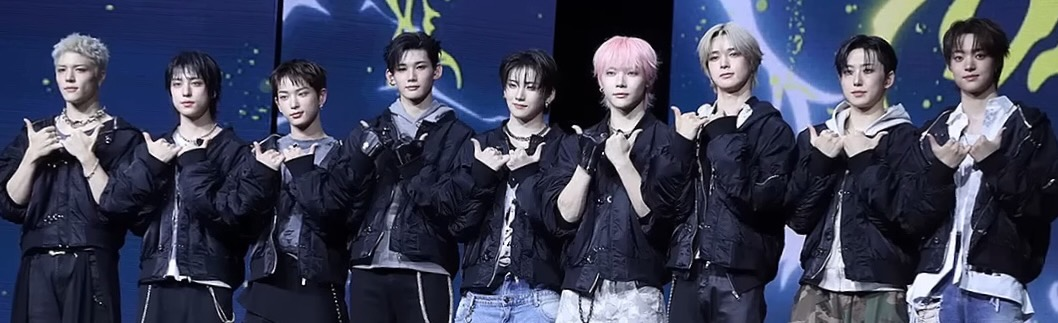
- &Team in October 2025; L–R: Maki, Taki, Harua, Jo, Yuma, Nicholas, K, Fuma, and EJ

Background information
- Also known as: andTeam
- Genre: J-pop • K-pop
- Years active: 2022–present
- Labels: YX Labels (Note: Formerly Hybe Labels Japan.); Universal Music Japan
- Members: K; Fuma; Nicholas; EJ; Yuma; Jo; Harua; Taki; Maki
- Website: andteam-official.jp

&Team (Japanese: エンティーム; Korean: 앤팀) is a Japanese boy band formed by YX Labels. (Note: Formerly Hybe Labels Japan.) The group is composed of nine members: K, Fuma, Nicholas, EJ, Yuma, Jo, Harua, Taki, and Maki. They were formed through the reality/survival program &Audition – The Howling – as their label's first group. &Team released their debut single "Under the Skin" on November 21, 2022, and officially debuted with their first extended play (EP) First Howling: Me on December 7, 2022. In 2025, &Team officially debuted in South Korea with the Korean-language EP Back to Life.

== History ==
=== 2020–2022: Pre-debut activities and formation ===
K, Nicholas, EJ, and Taki competed on the 2020 South Korean survival show I-Land, which ultimately produced the boy group Enhypen. On January 1, 2021, Big Hit Japan announced the launch of the "Big Hit Japan Global Debut Project" to search for artists to debut as a group in Japan and become active worldwide. On March 19, Big Hit Entertainment re-branded and re-structured into Hybe Corporation. On April 26, K and EJ made cameo appearances in the music video for Enhypen's "Drunk-Dazed".

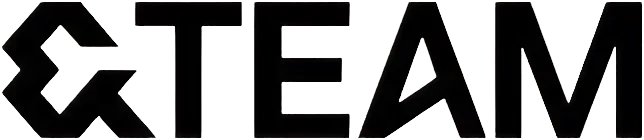
Official logo of &Team

On November 4, it was announced that K, Nicholas, EJ, and Taki would participate as confirmed members of the planned group and would be joined by additional trainees to be selected through a new audition program. &Audition – The Howling began airing on July 9, 2022, and the nine final members were unveiled on September 3 via live broadcast from Tokyo. On September 26, their fandom name was announced to be "Luné", meaning moon, a backronym for "Light Up New Energy". The group's name, &Team, refers to "9 diverse members forming a team and connecting diverse worlds".

=== 2022–2023: Debut, first fan meeting, and first releases ===
&Team at Incheon International Airport in 2023

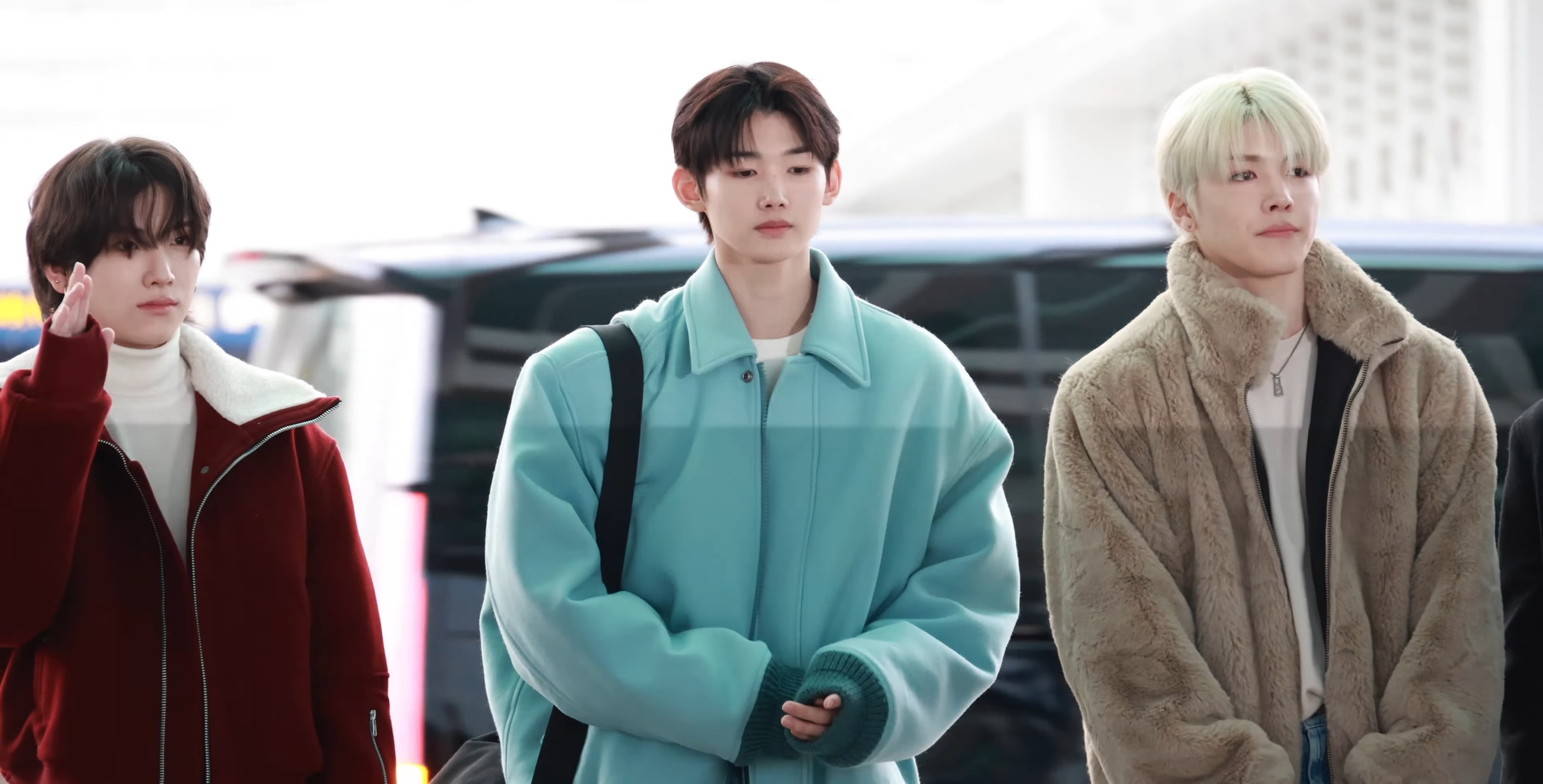
Yuma, Jo, Maki

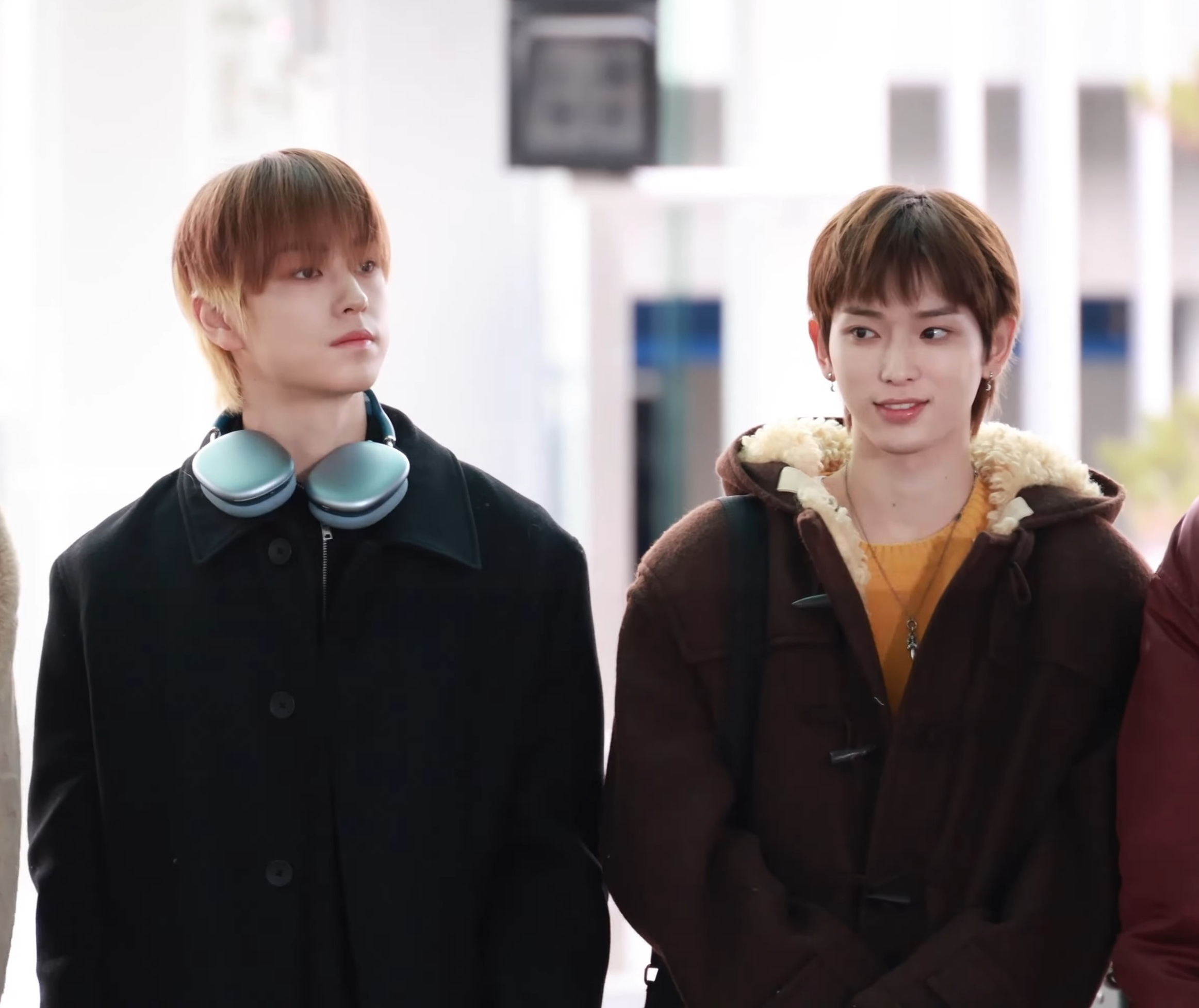
Taki, Harua

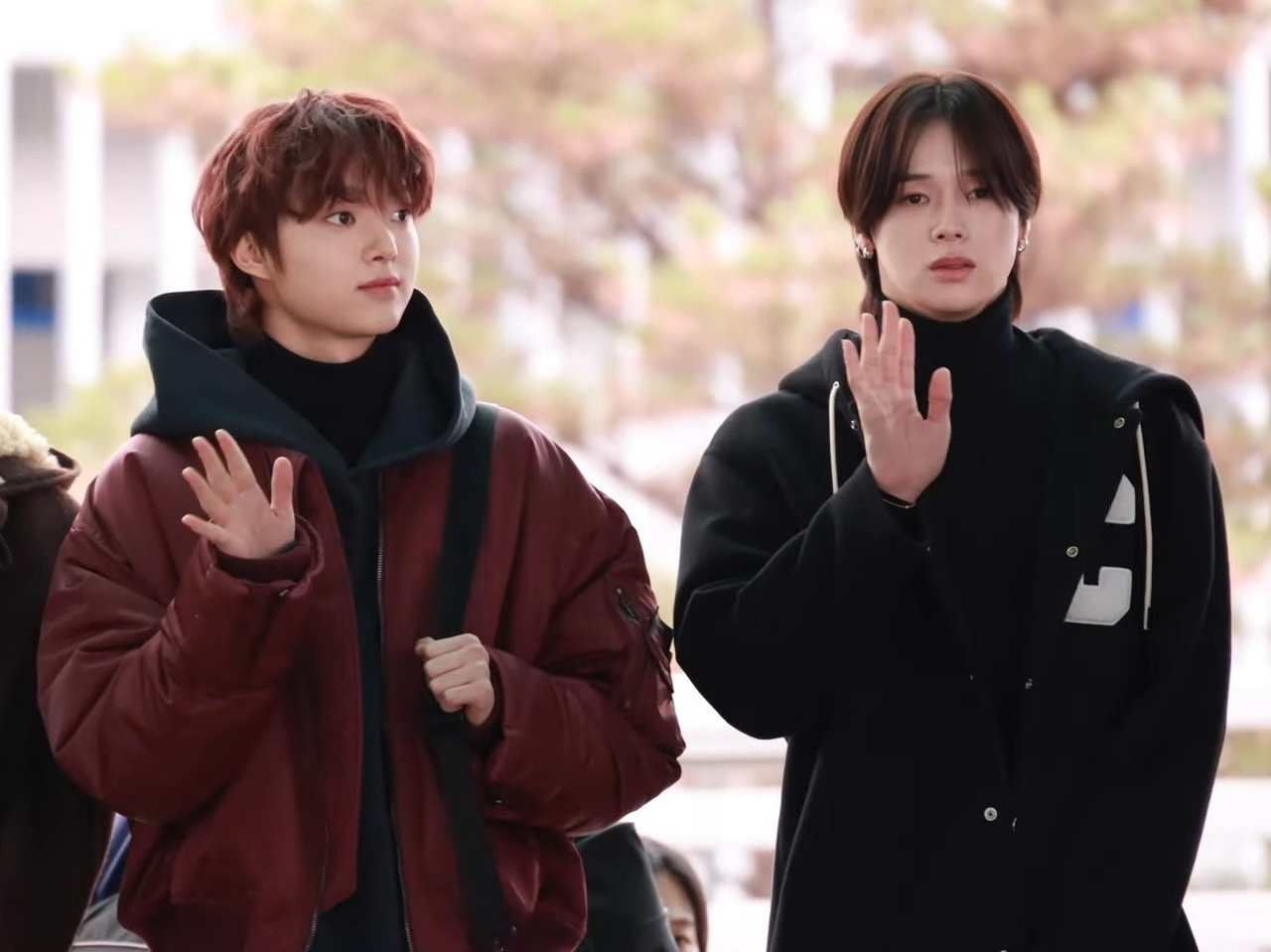
EJ, K

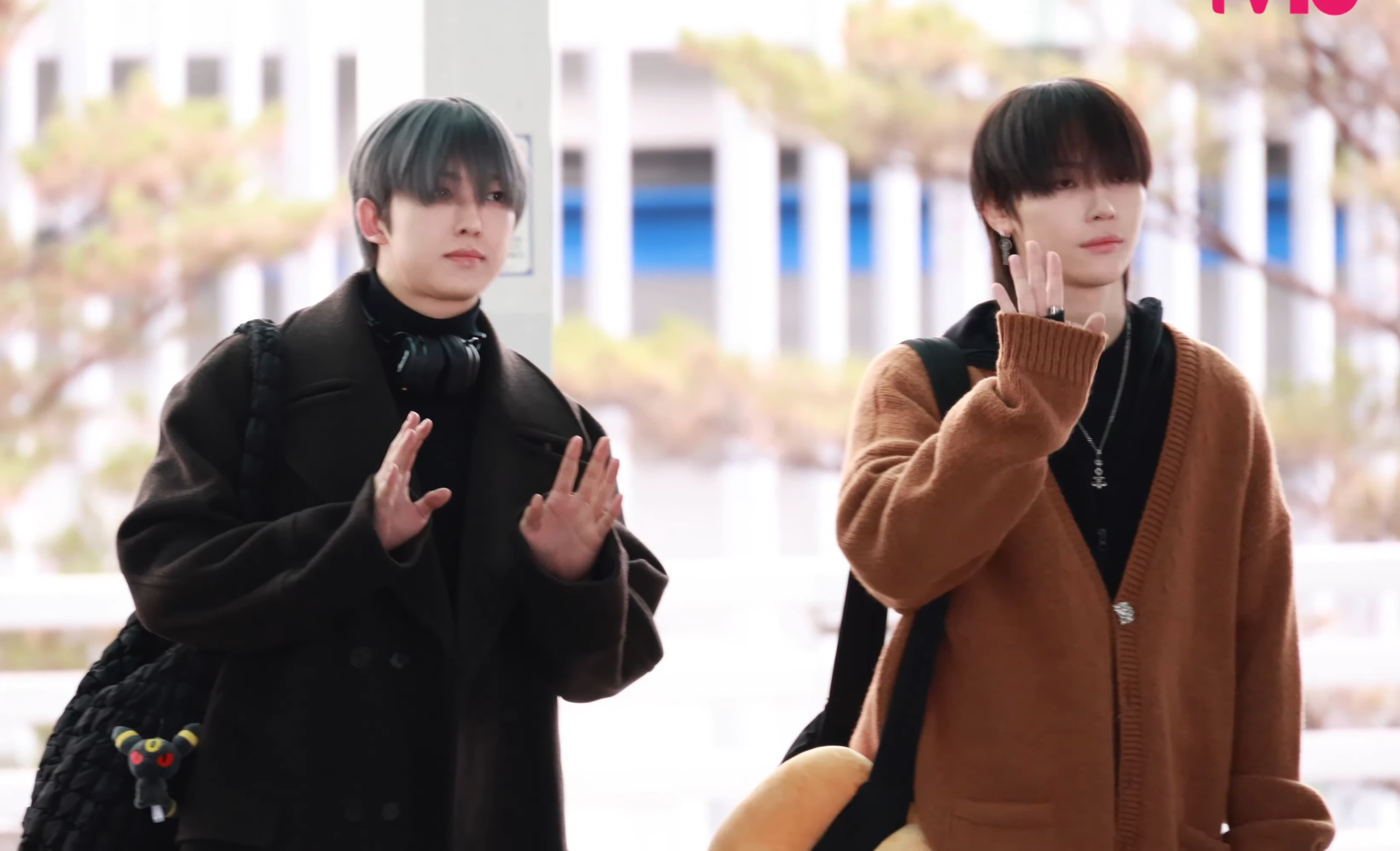
Fuma, Nicholas

Hybe Labels Japan announced that &Team would release their debut extended play (EP), First Howling: Me on December 7, 2022. The group's self-variety show, &Team Gakuen (&TEAM学園), began airing on November 12; various guests were invited while viewers were able to see their debut preparations in South Korea and Japan. On November 21, 2022, &Team released their first music video and digital single, titled "Under the Skin".

On December 5, 2022, a webtoon featuring the group's members, Dark Moon: The Grey City, was published. Two days later, they released First Howling: Me alongside the music video for "Scent of You"; in the first week of its release, the EP sold 151,000 copies.

On March 2, 2023, it was announced the group would hold their first Japanese fan meeting tour 2023 &Team Fantour Luné Mare: Tsuki-Nami, from May 27 to June 16. On March 2, it was announced that members EJ, K, Nicholas, and Taki would release "W.O.L.F. (Win Or Lose Fight)" on March 16 as the soundtrack for their webtoon Dark Moon: The Grey City.

On May 7, &Team released "Blind Love" as the theme song of the NTV drama Dr. Chocolate.

On May 14, the track list for their new mini album was released, revealing their title track "Firework". &Team released their second extended play First Howling: We on June 14, 2023.

On September 3, &Team held their first anniversary event &Team 1st Anniversary (縁 Day) in Japan, as well as in Seoul on September 9.

On November 15, the group released their first studio album First Howling: Now. Following the release of the album on November 15, the album placed first on the Billboard Japan Hot albums and second on the Oricon Albums Chart in Japan.

On December 19, &Team announced that they would embark on a concert tour in 2024, titled First Paw Print. The tour will occur from January 21 to March 3 and will take place in seven Japanese cities and one South Korean city.

=== 2024: "Samidare", "Aoarashi", "Jyuugoya" and Yukiakari ===
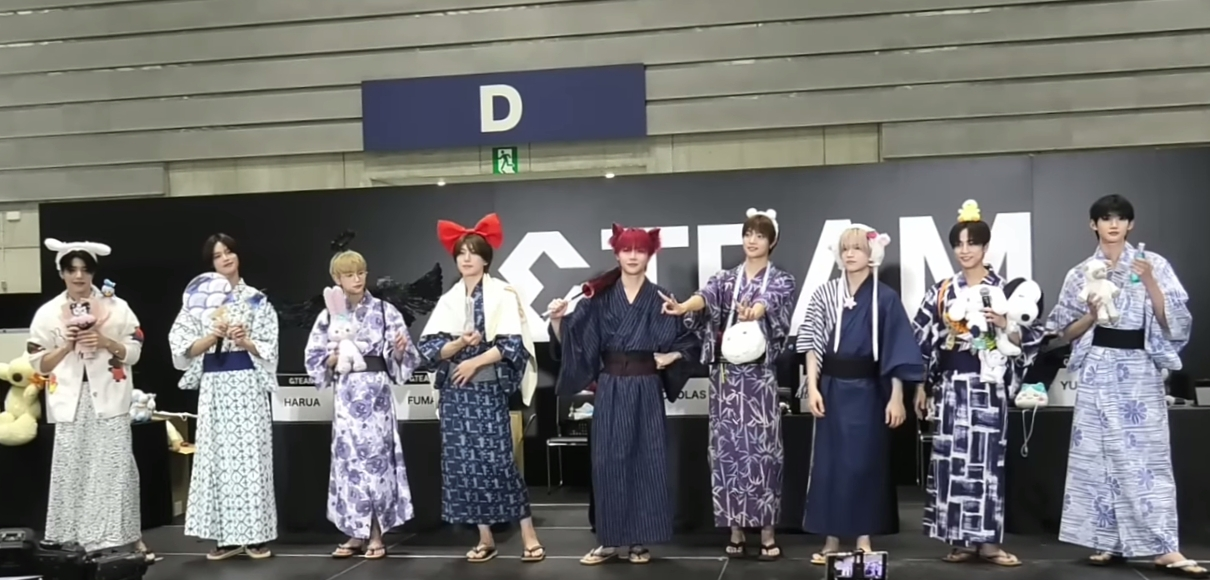
&Team at a promotional event for "Aoarashi" in 2024

On March 12, 2024, &Team announced that they would release their first single on May 8. On April 6, the title of their first single album was revealed to be "Samidare" (五月雨).

On June 10, the single album Samidare was certified double platinum by the Recording Industry Association of Japan for the first time, with cumulative sales of over 500,000 copies. On June 14, &Team announced that they would release their second single "Aoarashi" (青嵐) on August 7.

On July 10, the music-themed Grammy Museum in Los Angeles, California announced that a special K-pop exhibit will take place in August 2024, displaying the accessories and performance gear worn by artists under Hybe.

On August 14, it ranked first on the Billboard Japan Hot 100 singles chart for the first time. On August 20, Aoarashi entered the World Music Awards "United World chart" for the first time, ranking 30th with a score of 96,000. On August 31, it was announced that &Team would be responsible performing the opening theme song "Beat the Odds" for the anime "Trillion Game".

&Team released "Jyuugoya" (十五夜) on October 23 as a pre-release single for their second full-length album Yukiakari (雪明かり), which was released on December 18. Also in December, &Team released "Magic Hour" and "Wonderful World", the opening and ending themes of the anime television series Honey Lemon Soda.

=== 2025: Go in Blind, first Asia tour and Korean debut ===
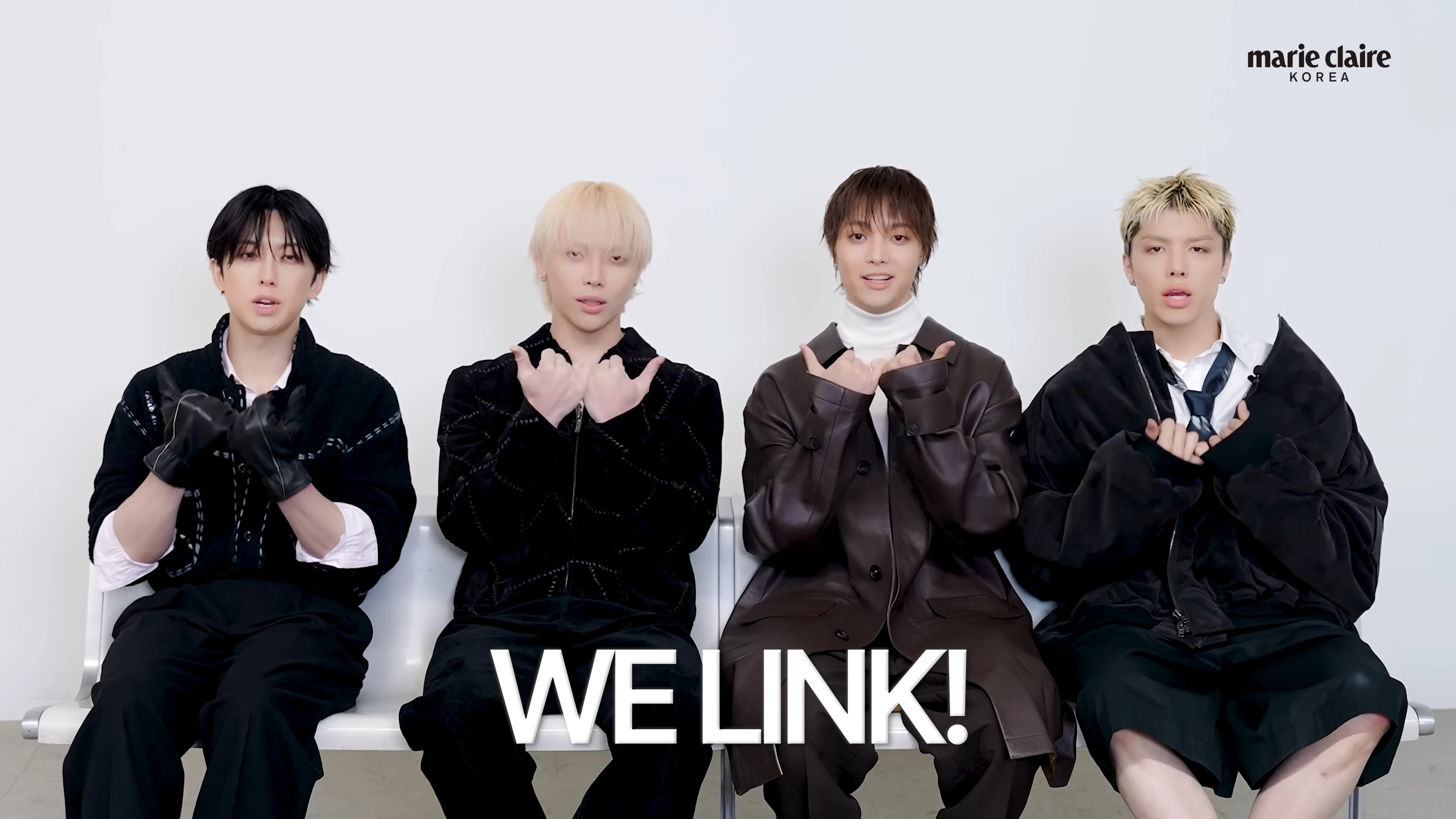
Fuma, Nicholas, EJ, and Maki delivering the group's "we link" introduction greeting in 2025

On January 7, 2025, &Team members began hosting a biweekly podcast titled &Team's "Fortunate Chance to Talk to You" (or Enshabe), (Note: Japanese: &TEAMの「ごエンがあって、 しゃべらせてもらってます。」; shortened to エンしゃべ) distributed by TV Tokyo.

&Team released their third lead single "Go in Blind" on April 23. The EP Go in Blind became the first of &Team's releases to be certified 3× Platinum by the Recording Industry Association of Japan for the first time in April for sales of more than 750,000 copies, with total sales exceeding 800,000 copies. Their debut album First Howling: ME was also certified platinum in April. On August 8, &Team received their first million certification from RIAJ for "Go in Blind", recognizing the cumulative sales of over 1,000,000 physical units of the single.

&Team appeared in the Japanese live-action film Ya Boy Kongming! the Movie, adapted from the Japanese manga Ya Boy Kongming!. In the film, which was released on April 25, they represented the music label Key Time on the stage of the Music Battle Festival and competed with the other two major music labels for the championship.

In May, they began their first Asia tour, titled Awaken the Bloodline.

On September 3, during the last show of their third anniversary event, &Team announced that they would make their Korean debut with the mini-album Back to Life. They also announced a six-episode documentary program titled &Team 100日密着: Howling Out to the World, which was broadcast on Hulu Japan, Nippon Television, and YouTube weekly starting October 2. On October 24, YX Labels announced that, from mid-November 2025 to February 2026, K and Jo "may have difficulty participating in some schedules", including promotions of Back to Life, "due to personal activities".

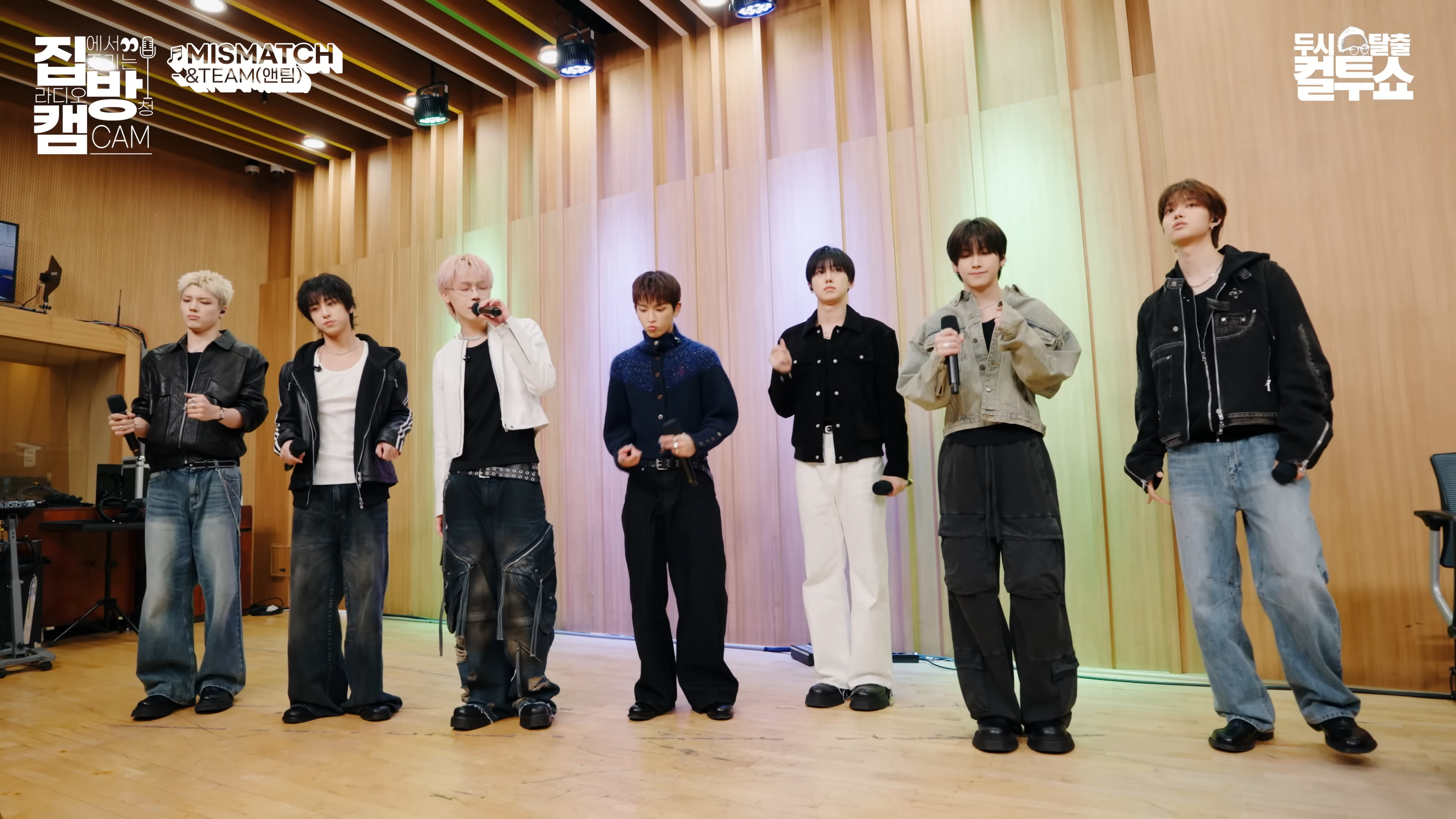
&Team performing "Mismatch" while promoting Back to Life in South Korea

&Team made their official Korean debut on October 28 with the mini-album Back to Life. The EP achieved immediate commercial success, selling 1,139,988 copies on its release day, making &Team a double million-seller following Go in Blind. Back to Life topped Oricon Daily Album ranking, becoming the first Korean album by a Japanese artist to do so. &Team achieved a television triple crown on Korean music programs with the lead single "Back to Life", winning SBS M's The Show, MBC M's Show Champion, and KBS2's Music Bank.

=== 2026: "Kawasaki", We on Fire, second Asia tour and Mark on Me ===
On February 20, Hybe Latin America released a remix of the Santos Bravos song "Kawasaki" featuring &Team members Nicholas, Yuma, Jo, and Maki.

&Team's third EP, We on Fire, was released on April 21. "Sakura-iro Yell" had been previously released as a single for the EP on March 14. We on Fire sold over one million copies on its first day of release, becoming the first Japanese album to surpass one million sales on the Korean Hanteo chart. On April 29, &Team won the Korean music program Show Champion.

In May 13, they began their second Asia tour, titled Blaze The Way. On May 30, &Team entered the Billboard 200 for the first time, with their third Japanese EP, "We on Fire", debuting at No. 52.

On July 5, &Team announced their second Korean mini album, Mark on Me, scheduled for September 8. On July 31, &TEAM announced that their digital single "For Us" would drop the next day on August 1 as the official theme song for the live-action movie Wandance.

== Artistry and public image ==
&Team was created in September 2022 through the survival reality competition program &Audition – The Howling. &Team is the first "global group" of South Korean entertainment company Hybe, developed under the company's "multi-home, multi-genre" strategy. With this strategy, the company has developed "localized" groups that are based outside of South Korea, including &Team, US-based Katseye, and Mexico-based Santos Bravos. As part of its global expansion efforts, &Team debuted in South Korea in October 2025 with the Korean-language EP Back to Life. Prior to their Korean debut, &Team were active in South Korea through concerts, fan events, and televised performances of Korean versions of their Japanese songs. Since their debut, their music has received wider international distribution than typical Japanese acts, with global streaming distribution and their promotions crossing over into K-pop.

Japanese record producer Soma Genda has worked with &Team as their main producer since &Audition, where he was a mentor. &Team is described as both J-pop and K-pop. Speaking to Billboard Korea about &Team's position as Hybe's first global group, &Team leader EJ said:

People sometimes ask if &Team is K-pop or J-pop, but I'd like the focus to be on the music as it is, rather than the language. I'm proud that we play a role in expanding the company's musical style and culture. I hope people feel our appeal beyond language and borders.

Since their debut, &Team's visual and sonic identity has been shaped by a strong werewolf theme. To accompany this style, Hybe released the Dark Moon: The Grey City webnovel and webtoon series; the characters, which are based on the members of &Team, are werewolves. The Grey City is an expansion of Dark Moon: The Blood Altar, which is based on Enhypen as vampires. The Dark Moon series was later expanded with Dark Moon: The Witch of Yerasah, a multimedia project featuring the music of &Team. Music videos and promotional materials for &Team's fifth EP, We on Fire, contained references to The Witch of Yerasah.

Seven of &Team's nine members are from Japan; EJ is from South Korea and Nicholas is from Taiwan. All members of &Team are fluent in both Japanese and Korean. Additionally, Nicholas speaks Mandarin Chinese and English, and Maki (who is of Japanese and German descent) speaks English and German. EJ is the leader of &Team and Fuma is the sub-leader. K is often described as the group's performance leader, in charge of the group's choreography; he choreographed some parts of some of the group's songs.

== Members ==
- K (ケイ) – performance leader
- Fuma (フウマ) – sub-leader
- Nicholas (王奕翔; ニコラス)
- EJ (변의주; ウィジュ) – leader
- Yuma (ユウマ)
- Jo (ジョウ)
- Harua (ハルア)
- Taki (タキ)
- Maki (マキ)

== Discography ==
=== Studio albums ===
List of studio albums, showing selected details, selected chart positions, and sales figures
Title	Details	Peak chart positions			Sales	Certifications
Title	Details	JPN	JPN Comb.	JPN Hot	Sales	Certifications
First Howling: Now	Released: November 15, 2023; Label: YX Labels; Formats: CD, digital download, streaming; Track listing: 1. "War Cry"; 2. "Dropkick"; 3. "Really Crazy" (チンチャおかしい); 4. "Alien" (規格外); 5. "Firework"; 6. "Road Not Taken"; 7. "The Moon Is Beautiful" (月が綺麗ですね); 8. "Blind Love"; 9. "Under the Skin"; 10. "Scent of You"; 11. "Buzz Love" (バズ恋); 12. "War Cry" (Korean version); 13. "Road Not Taken" (Korean version); 14. "Firework" (Korean version); 15. "Scent of You" (Korean version); 16. "The Final Countdown" (&Team version); 17. "Melody" (&Team version); 18. "Running with the Pack" (&Team version)	1	1	1	JPN: 119,458 (Phy.); JPN: 1,200 (Dig.)	RIAJ (Phy.): Platinum
Yukiakari	Released: December 18, 2024; Label: YX Labels; Formats: CD, digital download, streaming; Track listing: 1. "Yukiakari" (雪明かり); 2. "Deer Hunter"; 3. "Illumination"; 4. "Crescent Moon's Wish" (三日月の願い); 5. "Samidare" (五月雨); 6. "Scar to Scar"; 7. "Maybe" (君にカエル); 8. "Aoarashi" (青嵐); 9. "Koegawari" (声変わり); 10. "Imprinted" (向日葵); 11. "Jyuugoya" (十五夜); 12. "Big Suki" (Big好き); 13. "Beat the Odds"; 14. "Feel the Pulse"; 15. "Meme"; 16. "Samidare" (Korean version); 17. "Scar to Scar" (Korean version); 18. "Aoarashi" (Korean version); 19. "Koegawari" (Korean version); 20. "Yukiakari" (Korean version); 21. "Deer Hunter" (Korean version); 22. "Dropkick" (Korean version)	1	1	1	JPN: 362,034 (Phy.)	RIAJ (Phy.): 2× Platinum

=== Extended plays ===
List of extended plays, showing selected details, selected chart positions, and sales figures
Title	Details	Peak chart positions									Sales	Certifications
Title	Details	JPN	JPN Comb.	JPN Hot	AUT	BEL (FL)	FRA	KOR	US	US World	Sales	Certifications
First Howling: Me	Released: December 7, 2022 (JPN); Label: Hybe Labels Japan; Formats: CD, digital download, streaming; Track listing: 1. "Under the Skin"; 2. "Scent of You"; 3. "Buzz Love" (バズ恋); 4. "The Final Countdown" (&Team version)	1	1	1	—	—	—	—	—	—	JPN: 250,000 (Phy.); JPN: 1,858 (Dig.)	RIAJ (Phy.): Platinum
First Howling: We	Released: June 14, 2023 (JPN); Label: Hybe Labels Japan; Formats: CD, digital download, streaming; Track listing: 1. "Firework"; 2. "Road Not Taken"; 3. "The Moon Is Beautiful" (月が綺麗ですね); 4. "Blind Love"; 5. "Firework" (Korean version); 6. "Scent of You" (Korean version)	1	1	1	—	—	—	—	—	—	JPN: 191,048 (Phy.); JPN: 1,349 (Dig.)	RIAJ (Phy.): Platinum
Back to Life	Released: October 28, 2025 (KOR); Label: YX Labels; Formats: CD, digital download, streaming; Track listing: 1. "Back to Life"; 2. "Lunatic"; 3. "Mismatch"; 4. "Rush"; 5. "Heartbreak Time Machine"; 6. "Who Am I"	1	1	1	59	148	156	1	— (Note: Back to Life did not enter the Billboard 200, but peaked at number 13 on the Top Album Sales chart.)	5	JPN: 750,000; KOR: 1,331,733	RIAJ (Phy.): 3× Platinum; KMCA: Million
We on Fire	Released: April 21, 2026 (JPN); Label: YX Labels; Formats: CD, digital download, streaming; Track listing: 1. "We on Fire"; 2. "Bewitched"; 3. "Hotline" (ホットライン); 4. "Sakura-iro Yell"; 5. "We on Fire" (Korean version); 6. "Bewitched" (Korean version)	1	1	1	—	101	—	2	52	2	JPN: 559,553; KOR: 1,193,073	RIAJ (Phy.): 3× Platinum; KMCA: Million
Mark on Me	Released: September 8, 2026 (KOR); Label: YX Labels; Formats: CD, QR, digital download, streaming	1	1	1	69	31	—	1	20	1	JPN: 511,457; KOR: 1,295,214	RIAJ (Phy.): 2× Platinum

=== Single albums ===
List of singles as lead artist with selected chart positions and sales, showing year released, certification and album name
Title	Year	Peak chart positions			Sales	Certifications	Album
Title	Year	JPN	JPN Comb.	JPN Hot	Sales	Certifications	Album
"Samidare" (五月雨)	2024	2	2	2	JPN: 308,868 (phy.); JPN: 5,317 (dig.)	RIAJ (Phy.): 2× Platinum	Yukiakari
"Aoarashi" (青嵐)	2024	1	1	1	JPN: 372,959 (phy.); JPN: 2,757 (dig.)	RIAJ (Phy.): 2× Platinum	Yukiakari
"Go in Blind" (月狼)	2025	1	1	2	JPN: 1,000,000 (phy.)	RIAJ (Phy.): Million	Go in Blind
"—" denotes releases that did not chart or were not released in that region.

=== Promotional singles ===
List of promotional singles, with selected chart positions, showing year released, sales, and album name
Title	Year	Peak chart positions			Sales	Album
Title	Year	JPN Hot	JPN Comb.	KOR	Sales	Album
"Under the Skin"	2022	49	—	—		First Howling: Me
"Firework"	2023	93	—	—		First Howling: We
"War Cry"	2023	—	—	—		First Howling: Now
"Jyuugoya" (十五夜)	2024	93	—	—	JPN: 1,238 (dig.)	Yukiakari
"Yukiakari" (雪明かり)	2024	36	44	—	JPN: 1,631 (dig.)	Yukiakari
"Back to Life"	2025	26	25	131		Back to Life
"We on Fire"	2026	43	—	—		We on Fire
"Mark on Me"	2026	25	—	167		Mark on Me
"—" denotes releases that did not chart or were not released in that region.

=== Other charted songs ===
List of other charted songs, with selected chart positions, showing year released and album name
Title	Year	Peak chart positions	Sales	Album
Title	Year	JPN Down.	Sales	Album
"Maybe" (君にカエル)	2024	25	JPN: 1,969 (dig.)	Yukiakari
"Scar to Scar"	2024	47	JPN: 1,301 (dig.)	Yukiakari
"Koegawari" (声変わり)	2024	74		Yukiakari

=== Soundtrack appearances ===
List of soundtrack appearances, with selected chart positions, showing year released and album name
Title	Year	Peak chart positions	Album
Title	Year	JPN Down.	Album
"Buzz Love" (バズ恋)	2022	—	First Howling: Me, First Howling: Now and Romance Before Debut OST
"W.O.L.F. (Win or Lose Fight)"	2023	68	Dark Moon: The Grey City OST
"Blind Love"	2023	74	First Howling: We, First Howling: Now and Dr. Chocolate OST
"Beat the Odds"	2024	48	Trillion Game OST, Yukiakari
"Meme"	2024	50	Minna no Uta OST, Yukiakari
"Feel the Pulse"	2024	—	Golden Kamuy OST, Yukiakari
"Magic Hour / Wonderful World"	2025	39	Honey Lemon Soda OST
"Magic Hour / Wonderful World"	2025	46	Honey Lemon Soda OST
"Extraordinary Day" (Note: Theme song for the TBS 2025 Beppu-Oita Mainichi Marathon.)	2025	—	Non-album songs
"Otakebi" (featuring &Team) (Note: Theme song of the 2025–26 season of the Japanese basketball league B.League.)	2025	—	Non-album songs
"For Us" (Note: Theme song for the film Wandance.)	2026	—	Non-album songs
"—" denotes releases that did not chart.

== Filmography ==
=== Reality and documentary series ===
Year	Title	Network	Notes	Ref.
2022	&Audition –The Howling–	YouTube, Hulu Japan, Nippon TV	Survival show featuring trainees aiming to become &TEAM members; eight episodes.	
2022	&Team Gakuen (Season 1)	Hulu Japan, Nippon TV	Variety show following &TEAM in South Korea and Japan as they prepare for their debut receive visits from various guests and seniors in the entertainment industry.	
2024	&Team Gakuen (Season 2)	Hulu Japan, Nippon TV	Variety show following &TEAM in South Korea and Japan as they prepare for their debut receive visits from various guests and seniors in the entertainment industry.	
2024	Go One!!! Meet & Link	YouTube	Variety show that features the members of &TEAM in different games, challenges or activities each episode.	
2025	All!Light! &Team ~Operation Luné~	Mnet Japan	Variety show that aims to show a different side of the group, such as how they interact with people and take on missions alone.	
2025	[TOKYO023] (東京お23)	YouTube	Variety show, where they will guide Luné through the 23 wards of Tokyo.	
2025	&Team 100日密着 ~Howling out to the World~	Hulu Japan, Nippon TV, TVer, YouTube	Documentary program showing the "true faces" of &TEAM as they take a step from Japan to the world; six episodes.	
2026	&TEAM COURSE	YouTube	Variety show, which showcases the charm, teamwork, and ingenuity of the members.	
2026	GRandSLAM!	YouTube	Variety show.	
2026	＆TEAM vs FANTASTICS 最強スターはどっちだ？		Variety show.	

=== Dramas ===
Year	Title	Network	Role	Notes
2023	Dr. Chocolate	Nippon TV	World Class: Yuma (Bobby), Harua (Andy), Taki (Louis), Maki (Curtis)	Ep. 3

=== Podcast ===
Year	Title	Platform	Episodes
2025	Fortunate Chance to Talk to You (&TALK) (ごエンがあって、しゃべらせてもらってます)	YouTube, Spotify, Apple Podcasts, Amazon Music	22
2026	Fortunate Chance to Talk to You (&TALK) (ごエンがあって、しゃべらせてもらってます)	YouTube, Spotify, Apple Podcasts, Amazon Music	22

=== Movie ===
Year	Title	Role
2025	Paripi Komei: The Movie	&TEAM (Themselves)

=== Special programs ===
- Best Artist (December 12, 2022 – December 2, 2023 – November 30, 2024, Nippon TV)
- 2022 FNS Kayousai 2nd Night (December 12, 2022, Fuji TV)
- CDTV Live! Live! Christmas 4 Hours SP (December 12, 2022, TBS TV)
- CDTV Live! Live! New Year's Eve Special 2022 → 2023 (December 31, 2022 – January 1, 2023, TBS TV)
- The Music Day (July 1, 2023, Nippon TV)
- FNS Musical Festival (July 12, 2023, Fuji TV)
- Ongakunohi (July 15, 2023, TBS TV)
- Music Expo 2023 (September 14, 2023, NHK)
- Best Artist (December 2, 2023, Nippon TV)
- SBS Gayo Daejeon (December 12, 2023, SBS TV)
- KBS Song Festival (December 15, 2023, KBS TV)
- MBC Gayo Daejejeon (December 31, 2023, MBC TV)
- Tokyo Music Festival (June 26, 2024, TV TOKYO)
- The Music Day (July 6, 2024, Nippon TV)
- Ongakunohi (July 13, 2024, TBS TV)
- Idol Star Athletics Championships – Chuseok Special (September 16, 2024, MBC TV)
- Tokyo Music Festival (November 20, 2024, TV TOKYO)
- Best Artist (November 30, 2024, Nippon TV)
- CDTV Live! Live! Christmas SP (December 16, 2024, TBS TV)
- CDTV Live! Live! New Year's Eve SP (December 31, 2024, TBS TV)
- Idol Star Athletics Championships (October 8, 2025, MBC)
- 76th NHK Kohaku Uta Gassen on New Years Eve (December 31, 2026, NHK)
- 2026 Superstar Red and White Entertainment Awards (January 31, 2026, TTV)

== Videography ==
=== Music videos ===
Year	Song title	Version	Album/Single	Director(s)	Ref.
2022	"Under the Skin"	Music video	First Howling: Me	Seong Wonmo (Digipedi)	
2022	"Under the Skin"	Choreography ver.	First Howling: Me	Seong Wonmo (Digipedi)	
2022	"Under the Skin"	Extended ver.	First Howling: Me	Seong Wonmo (Digipedi)	
2022	"Scent of You"	Music video	First Howling: Me	Myungbae (Zanybros)	
2023	"Firework"	Music video	First Howling: We	Seong Wonmo (Digipedi)	
2023	"Firework"	Special Video (Filmed by you ver.)	First Howling: We	Seong Wonmo (Digipedi)	
2023	"Firework (Korean ver.)"	Performance	First Howling: We	Guzza (KUDO)	
2023	"Road Not Taken"	Music video	First Howling: We	Hong Jaehwan, Lee Hyesu (SWISHER)	
2023	"War Cry"	Music video	First Howling: Now	Seong Wonmo (Digipedi)	
2023	"War Cry (Korean ver.)"	Performance	First Howling: Now	Seong Wonmo (Digipedi)	
2023	"Dropkick"	Music video	First Howling: Now	Kim In-tae (AFF)	
2024	"Maybe"	Track video	Samidare	Kwon Yongsoo (Studio Saccharin)	
2024	"Samidare"	Music video	Samidare	Kwon Yongsoo (Studio Saccharin)	
2024	"Koegawari"	Music video	Aoarashi	Sunghwi (nvrmnd)	
2024	"Aoarashi"	Music video	Aoarashi	Kwon Yongsoo (Studio Saccharin)	
2024	"Imprinted"	Track video: Our Summer Log-	Aoarashi	HALEX (MINIMA Media)	
2024	"Jyuugoya"	Music video	Jyuugoya	Mona	
2024	"Illumination"	Music video	Yukiakari	Yun Jooyeong (EARTHLUK)	
2024	"Yukiakari"	Music video	Yukiakari	Kwon Yongsoo (Studio Saccharin)	
2024	"Yukiakari"	Performance	Yukiakari	Kwon Yongsoo (Studio Saccharin)	
2025	"Deer Hunter"	Music video	Yukiakari	Kim Jooae (AEDIASTUDIO)	
2025	"Go in Blind"	Performance	Go in Blind	Yuann	
2025	"Go in Blind"	Music video	Go in Blind	Yuann	
2025	"Back to Life"	Music video	Back to Life	Seong (Digipedi)	
2025	"Back to Life"	Performance	Back to Life	Seong (Digipedi)	
2025	"Lunatic"	Music video	Back to Life	YVNG WING (IDIOTS)	
2026	"We on Fire"	Music video	We on Fire	Hobin	
2026	"We on Fire"	Performance	We on Fire	Hobin	
2026	"Bewitched"	Animated film	We on Fire	—	
2026	"Mark on Me"	Music video	Mark on Me	Christian Haahs	
2026	"Good Boy"	Music video	Mark on Me	Beomjin	

=== Live clips ===
Year	Song title	Length	Ref.
2023	"Really Crazy"	2:49	
2023	"Alien"	3:03	
2026	"Sakura-iro Yell"	3:43	
2026	"Bewitched"	2:34	

== Bibliography ==
=== Web novels ===
- Dark Moon: The Grey City (2022–2023)
- Dark Moon: The Witch of Yerasah (2026–present)

=== Webtoons ===
- Dark Moon: The Grey City (2022–2023)

=== Photobooks ===
- &TEAM Memories: Our First Link (2024)

=== Annual packages ===
- &TEAM 2024 Season's Greeting 'My Best Friends'
- &TEAM 2025 Season's Greeting 'Puzzle of Me'
- &TEAM 2026 Season's Greeting 'In a Daydream'

== Live performances ==
=== Concert and tours ===
&TEAM Concert Tour 'First Paw Print' (2024)

Date	City	Country	Venue	Attendance
January 21	Kyoto	Japan	Rohm Theatre Kyoto	70,000
January 27	Fukuoka	Japan	Fukuoka Sunpalace	70,000
January 31	Saitama	Japan	Omiya Sonic City	70,000
February 2	Miyagi	Japan	Tokyo Electron Hall Miyagi	70,000
February 7–8	Kanagawa	Japan	Pacifico Yokohama	70,000
February 17–18	Seoul	South Korea	KBS Arena	70,000
February 28	Aichi	Japan	Nagoya Congress Center (Century Hall)	70,000
March 2–3	Osaka	Japan	Orix Theater	70,000
March 6–7	Kanagawa	Japan	Pacifico Yokohama	70,000

&TEAM Concert Tour 'Second To None' (2024)

Date	City	Country	Venue	Attendance
July 20–21	Tokyo	Japan	Ariake Arena	80,000
July 25–26	Hyogo	Japan	World Memorial Hall (Kobe World Hall)	80,000
August 17–18	Fukuoka	Japan	Marine Messe Fukuoka	80,000
August 30–31	Seoul	South Korea	Korea University (Hwajung Tiger Dome)	80,000
September 28–29	Aichi	Japan	Portmesse Nagoya (Exhibition Hall 1)	80,000

&TEAM Asia Tour 'Awaken the Bloodline' (2025)

Date	City	Country	Venue	Attendance
May 10–11	Aichi	Japan	Portmesse Nagoya (Exhibition Hall 1)	100,000
May 17–18	Tokyo	Japan	Tokio Ariake Arena	100,000
May 24	Bangkok	Thailand	MCC Hall The Mall Lifestore Bangkapi	100,000
May 27–28	Fukuoka	Japan	Marine Messe Fukuoka Hall A	100,000
June 7–8	Seoul	South Korea	Jamsil Indoor Stadium	100,000
June 15	Jakarta	Indonesia	ICE BSD	100,000
June 20	Taipei	Taiwan	Nangang Exhibition Center	100,000
July 5–6	Hyogo	Japan	Glion Arena Kobe	100,000
July 26	Hong Kong		AsiaWorld-Expo	100,000
October 25–26	Saitama	Japan	Saitama Super Arena	—

&TEAM Asia Tour 'Blaze The Way' (2026)

Date	City	Country	Venue	Attendance
May 13–14	Kanagawa	Japan	K-Arena Yokohama	—
May 23–24	Kagawa	Japan	Anabuki Arena Kagawa	—
May 30–31	Aichi	Japan	IG Arena	—
June 13–14	Fukuoka	Japan	Kitakyushu Messe	—
June 21	Taipei	Taiwan	NTSU Arena	—
June 27–28	Hyogo	Japan	Glion Arena Kobe	—
July 4–5	Incheon	South Korea	Inspire Arena	—
July 11	Hong Kong	Hong Kong	AsiaWorld-Expo, Runway 11	—
July 18	Bangkok	Thailand	Thunder Dome	—
July 25–26	Chiba	Japan	LaLa Arena Tokyo-Bay	—
August 19	Kuala Lumpur	Malaysia	Idea Live Arena	—
August 22	Singapore	Singapore	Arena@Expo	—
September 5–6	Saitama	Japan	Belluna Dome	—
October 3–4	Seoul	South Korea	KSPO Dome	—

=== Fan meetings ===
Title	Date	Venue	City	Country	Ref.
2023 &TEAM FanTour Lunémare: 月波 (Tsuki-Nami)	May 27–28, 2023	Osaka Prefectural International Conference Center (Grand Cube Osaka)	Osaka	Japan	
2023 &TEAM FanTour Lunémare: 月波 (Tsuki-Nami)	June 7–8, 2023	Aichi Prefectural Arts Theater	Nagoya	Japan	
2023 &TEAM FanTour Lunémare: 月波 (Tsuki-Nami)	June 15–16, 2023	Pacifico Yokohama National Convention Hall	Yokohama	Japan	
2025 &TEAM Fanmeeting '&︎❤︎' (&Heart)	February 12–13, 2025	Tokyo Garden Theater	Tokyo	Japan	

=== Anniversary events ===
Title	Date	Venue	City	County	Attendance	Ref.
&TEAM 1st Anniversary [縁 DAY]	September 3, 2023	Saitama Super Arena Community Arena	Saitama	Japan	10,000	
&TEAM 1st Anniversary [縁 DAY]	September 9, 2023	YES 24 Live Hall	Seoul	South Korea	2,000	
&TEAM 2nd Anniversary [縁 DAY]	September 3, 2024	Tokyo Garden Theater	Tokyo	Japan	13,000	
&TEAM 3rd Anniversary [縁 DAY]	September 2–3, 2025	Pia Arena MM	Yokohama	Japan	—	

=== Other events ===
Year	Event	Venue	City	Country	Ref.
2022	7th Asia Artist Awards	Nippon Gaishi Hall	Nagoya	Japan	
2022	Countdown Japan 22/23	Makuhari Messe	Chiba	Japan	
2023	All Night Nippon X Special Live 2023	Yokohama Arena	Yokohama	Japan	
2023	GMO Sonic 2023	Saitama Super Arena	Saitama	Japan	
2023	Tokyo Girls Collection 2023 SPRING/SUMMER	Yoyogi National Gymnasium	Tokyo	Japan	
2023	D.U.N.K. Showcase	Makuhari Messe	Chiba	Japan	
2023	The Dance Day Live 2023	Nippon Budokan	Tokyo	Japan	
2023	KCON Japan 2023	Makuhari Messe	Chiba	Japan	
2023	2023 Weverse Con Festival	Olympic Park KSPO Dome (Paradise Stage) 88 Lawn Field	Seoul	South Korea	
2023	Join Alive 2023	Iwamizawa Park (Outdoor Music Hall Kitaon & Hokkaido Greenland Amusement Park)	Iwamizawa	Japan	
2023	Tokyo Girls Collection 2023 Autumn/Winter	Saitama Super Arena	Saitama	Japan	
2023	2023 MAMA Awards	Tokyo Dome	Tokyo	Japan	
2023	D.U.N.K. Showcase	Kyocera Dome Osaka	Osaka	Japan	
2023	8th Asia Artist Awards	Philippine Arena	Ciudad de Victoria	Philippines	
2023	Music Bank Global Festival 2023	Belluna Dome	Saitama	Japan	
2023	Beat AX Vol.1	Ariake Arena	Tokyo	Japan	
2024	K-Pop Masterz×KROSS vol.3	Vantelin Dome Nagoya	Nagoya	Japan	
2024	Beat AX Vol.2	Yokohama Arena	Yokohama	Japan	
2024	Kstyle Party	Ariake Arena	Tokyo	Japan	
2024	Golden Wave in Taiwan	Kaohsiung National Stadium	Kaohsiung	Taiwan	
2024	KCON Japan 2024	Zozo Marine Stadium	Chiba	Japan	
2024	2024 Weverse Con Festival	Inspire Arena Discovery Park	Incheon	South Korea	
2024	Show! Music Core in Japan	Belluna Dome	Saitama	Japan	
2024	Waterbomb Tokyo 2024	Sea Forest Waterway	Tokyo	Japan	
2024	Rock In Japan Festival 2024	Soga Sports Park (Hillside Stage)	Chiba	Japan	
2024	Odaiba Adventure King 2024 ~Mezamashi Live~	Fuji TV Headquarters and the Odaiba and Aomi areas	Tokyo	Japan	
2024	The Fact Music Awards	Kyocera Dome Osaka	Osaka	Japan	
2024	CDTV Live! Live! Thanksgiving, Festival 2024	Tokyo Garden Theater	Tokyo	Japan	
2024	SBS Inkigayo Live in Tokyo	Saitama Super Arena, Japan	Saitama	Japan	
2024	Coke Studio Live 2024	Saitama Super Arena, Japan	Saitama	Japan	
2024	Superpop Japan 2024	Panasonic Stadium Suita	Suita	Japan	
2024	Livejack 2024 Smash Beat SP	Osaka-jō Hall	Osaka	Japan	
2024	9th Asia Artist Awards	Thammasat Stadium	Rangsit	Thailand	
2025	D.U.N.K. Showcase	K-Arena Yokohama	Yokohama	Japan	
2025	UTO Fest	K-Arena Yokohama	Yokohama	Japan	
2025	"Ya Boy Kongming! The Movie" Kick-off Party	Pia Arena MM	Yokohama	Japan	
2025	Kstyle Party 2025	Ariake Arena	Tokyo	Japan	
2025	TGC Kumamoto 2025 by Tokyo Girls Collection	Grandmesse Kumamoto	Kumamoto	Japan	
2025	DayDay. Super Live 2025	Pia Arena MM	Yokohama	Japan	
2025	Rakuten GirlsAward 2025 Spring/Summer	Yoyogi National Gymnasium	Tokyo	Japan	
2025	Asia Star Entertainer Awards 2025	K-Arena Yokohama	Yokohama	Japan	
2025	2025 Weverse Con Festival	Inspire Arena Discovery Park	Incheon	South Korea	
2025	Tigers B-Luck Dynamite Series 2025	Kyocera Dome Osaka	Osaka	Japan	
2025	Song for Children! 24-Hour TV Charity Live	Ariake Arena	Tokyo	Japan	
2025	Rock In Japan Festival 2025	Soga Sports Park	Chiba	Japan	
2025	Music Day Festival 2025	Tokyo Garden Theater	Tokyo	Japan	
2025	Coca-Cola X Fes 2025	Saitama Super Arena	Saitama	Japan	
2025	MBC Virtual Live Festival with Coupang Play	Sangam Culture Square	Seoul	South Korea	
2025	67th Japan Record Awards	New National Theatre Tokyo	Tokyo	Japan	
2025	Beat AX Vol.7	Ariake Arena	Tokyo	Japan	
2025	38th Shogakukan DIME Trend Awards 2025	—	Tokyo	Japan	
2025	Music Bank Global Festival In Japan 2025	Japan National Stadium	Tokyo	Japan	
2026	Resona Group B.LEAGUE ALL-STAR GAME WEEKEND 2026	HAPPINESS ARENA	Nagasaki	Japan	
2026	ONE REPUBLIC "From Asia, With Love" 2026 in Japan	K Arena Yokohama	Kanagawa	Japan	
2026	ONE REPUBLIC "From Asia, With Love" 2026 in Japan	GLION ARENA KOBE	Hyogo	Japan	
2026	CDTV Live! Live! Spring Thanksgiving, Festival 2026	K Arena Yokohama	Kanagawa	Japan	
2026	Inkigayo ON THE GO	Paradise City Plaza	Incheon	South Korea	
2026	KCON JAPAN 2026	Makuhari Messe	Chiba	Japan	
2026	Asia Star Entertainer Awards 2026	Belluna Dome	Saitama	Japan	
2026	DayDay. Super Live 2026	Nippon Budokan	Tokyo	Japan	
2026	2026 Weverse Con Festival	KSPO DOME 88 Lawn Field	Seoul	South Korea	
2026	Global Citizen Live: Tokyo	Tokyo International Forum (Hall A)	Tokyo	Japan	
2026	2026 MIXPOP CONCERT	Kaohsiung Music Center	Kaohsiung	Taiwan	
2026	KCON LA 2026	Crypto.com Arena	Los Angeles	United States	
2026	2026 K-World Dream Awards	KINTEX	Seoul	South Korea	
2026	MUSIC EXPO LIVE 2026 in Taipei	Taipei Arena	Taipei	Taiwan	
2026	MTV Video Music Awards Japan 2026	Tokyo Dome	Tokyo	Japan	
2026	11th Asia Artist Awards	Kaohsiung National Stadium	Kaohsiung	Taiwan	

== Awards and nominations ==
Name of the award ceremony, year presented, award category, nominee(s) of the award, and the result of the nomination
Award ceremony	Year	Category	Nominee(s)/work(s)	Result	Ref.
Asia Artist Awards	2023	Best Choice Award	&TEAM	Won	
Asia Artist Awards	2023	Best Emotive Award – Music	&TEAM	Won	
Asia Artist Awards	2023	Popularity Award – Male singer	&TEAM	Nominated	
Asia Artist Awards	2024	Best Icon Award	&TEAM	Won	
Asia Artist Awards	2024	Popularity Award – Male Singer	&TEAM	Nominated	
Asia Star Entertainer Awards	2025	The Platinum	&TEAM	Won	
Asia Star Entertainer Awards	2025	The Best Group (Male)	&TEAM	Nominated	
Asia Star Entertainer Awards	2025	Fan Choice Artist (Singer)	&TEAM	Nominated	
The Fact Music Awards	2024	Global Generation Award	&TEAM	Won	
Japan Gold Disc Awards	2023	Best 5 New Artists (Japanese)	&TEAM	Won	
Japan Gold Disc Awards	2025	Best 5 Albums (Japanese)	Yukiakari	Won	
MTV Video Music Awards Japan	2025	Best Buzz Artist	&TEAM	Won	
Universal Superstar Awards	2024	Universal Next Generation (Male)	&TEAM	Won	
Japan Music Awards	2025	Special International Music Award	&TEAM	Won	
38th Shogakunkan Dime Trend Awards	2025	Best Artist Award	&TEAM	Won	
40th Gold Disc Awards	2026	Album Bonsang	Back To Life	Nominated	
40th Gold Disc Awards	2026	Most Popular Artist – Male	&TEAM	Nominated	
33rd Hanteo Music Awards	2026	Artists of the Year (Bonsang)	&TEAM	Nominated	
33rd Hanteo Music Awards	2026	Best Continent Artist – Africa	&TEAM	Nominated	
33rd Hanteo Music Awards	2026	Best Continent Artist – Asia	&TEAM	Nominated	
33rd Hanteo Music Awards	2026	Best Continent Artist – Europe	&TEAM	Nominated	
33rd Hanteo Music Awards	2026	Best Continent Artist – North America	&TEAM	Nominated	
33rd Hanteo Music Awards	2026	Best Continent Artist – Oceania	&TEAM	Nominated	
33rd Hanteo Music Awards	2026	Best Continent Artist – South America	&TEAM	Nominated	
33rd Hanteo Music Awards	2026	WhosFandom Award	&TEAM	Nominated	
33rd Hanteo Music Awards	2026	Best Popular Artist	&TEAM	Nominated	
33rd Hanteo Music Awards	2026	Best Global Popular Artist	&TEAM	Nominated	
Japan Gold Disc Awards	2026	Best 5 Albums (Japanese)	Back to Life	Won	
Japan Gold Disc Awards	2026	Best 5 singles	Go in Blind	Won	
Asia Star Entertainer Awards	2026	The Platinum	&TEAM	Won	
Asia Star Entertainer Awards	2026	Performance of the Year	&TEAM	Won	
Asia Star Entertainer Awards	2026	The Best Group (Male)	&TEAM	Nominated	
2026 K-World Dream Awards	2026	Artist Award	&TEAM	Won	
2026 K-World Dream Awards	2026	Global Music Award	&TEAM	Won	
