= Taemin discography =

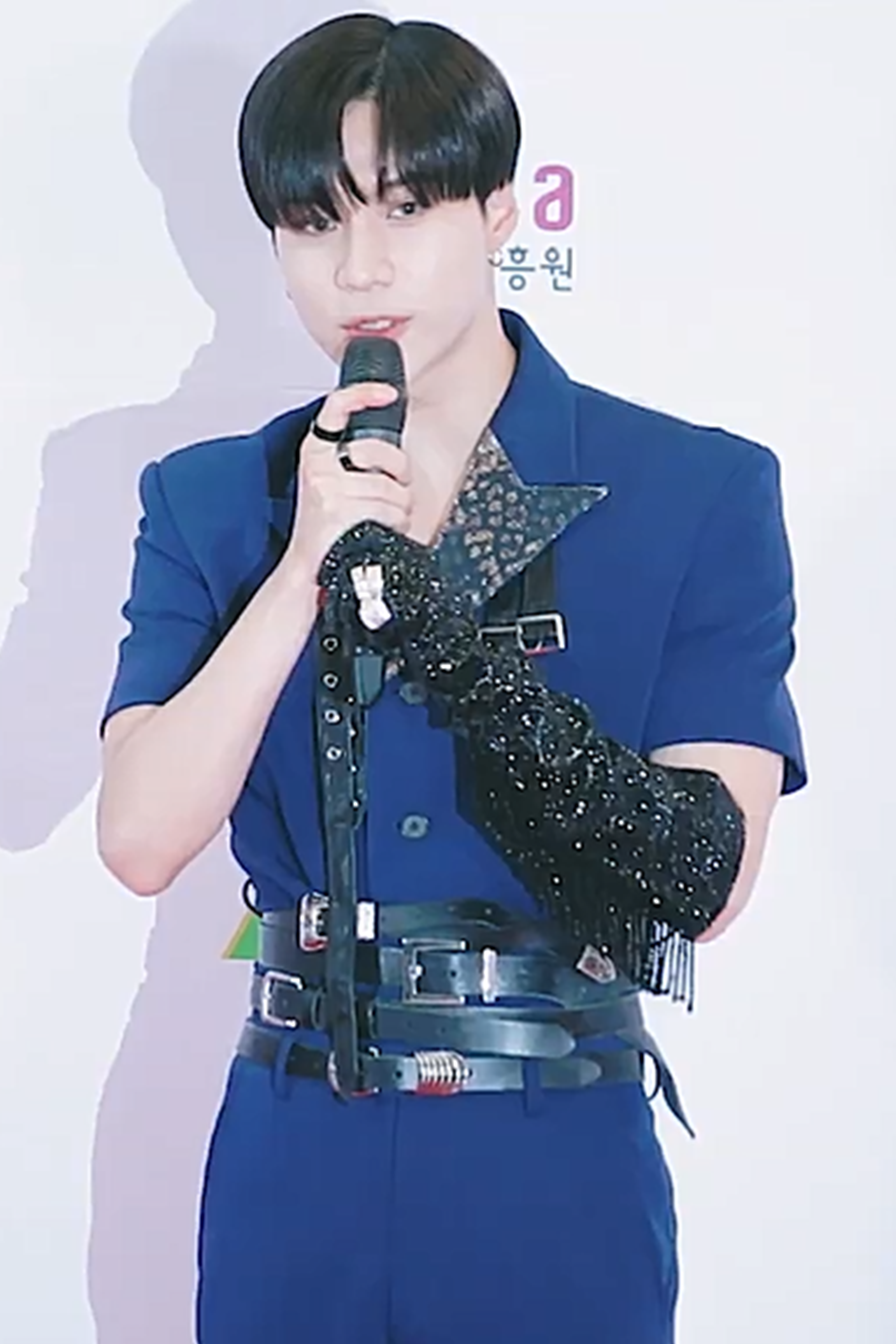
- Taemin at the 25th Dream Concert, in May 2019
- Studio albums: 4
- EPs: 9
- Compilation albums: 1
- Singles: 26
- Video albums: 4
- Promotional singles: 6
- Reissues: 1
- Music videos: 20

As a solo artist, South Korean singer Taemin has released four studio albums with one reissue, one compilation album, nine extended plays (EPs), twenty six singles (including one as featured artist) and six promotional singles. Taemin's music career began in 2008 as a member of boy band Shinee. In August 2014, he debuted as a solo artist by releasing his first extended play titled Ace, which topped the Gaon Album Chart, with lead single "Danger".

In February 2016, Taemin released his first studio album Press It which debuted in the top ten ranks of Billboard's Heatseekers and World Albums charts. Its lead single "Press Your Number" debuted at number 79 on the Billboard Japan Hot 100, the first song by Taemin to appear on the chart. In July 2016, Taemin released his first Japanese EP Sayonara Hitori, ranking at number three on both the Oricon Albums Chart and Billboard Japan Hot Albums. In July 2017, Taemin's second Japanese EP Flame of Love debuted at number two on the Oricon Albums Chart and Billboard Japan Hot Albums, selling more than 51,000 copies in its first month of release. In October, he released his second studio album Move, with the title track selling over 120,000 digital downloads during its first week of release. He then released the reissue Move-ing with single "Day and Night" in December the same year.

His eponymous first Japanese studio album (and third overall), Taemin, was released in November 2018. The album spawned three singles: "Eclipse", "Mars", and "Under My Skin". It earned second place on the Oricon Albums Chart and Billboard Japan Hot Albums after selling more than 50,000 copies in its first day of release. In February 2019, Taemin released his second EP in Korean (fourth in total) titled Want. His third Japanese EP (fifth in total), Famous, was then released in August, selling over 41,000 copies on its first day of sales. In 2020, Taemin released his third Korean studio album Never Gonna Dance Again which was released in two parts. "2 Kids" was released as the lead single in August 2020, while "Criminal" and "Idea" served as the main single of Act 1 and Act 2, respectively. The two "acts" were later released together as an album repackage Never Gonna Dance Again (Extended Ver.) on December 14, 2020. All three versions of the album charted in the top ten ranks of the Gaon Album Chart and sold more than 300,000 copies in total. In May 2021, Taemin released his third EP in Korean (sixth in total) titled Advice, which was also his last release before military service. His fourth Korean EP, Guilty, followed in October 2023 after his discharge.

== Albums ==
=== Studio albums ===
List of studio albums, with selected chart positions and sales
Title	Details	Peak chart positions								Sales
Title	Details	KOR	CHN	JPN	JPN Hot	UK Dig.	US Heat	US Indie	US World	Sales
Press It	Released: February 23, 2016 (KOR); Label: SM Entertainment; Formats: CD, digital download	1	1	15	16	—	7	31	2	KOR: 129,030; JPN: 11,086
Move	Released: October 16, 2017 (KOR); Label: SM Entertainment; Formats: CD, digital download	2	—	11	12	—	—	—	3	KOR: 117,994; JPN: 15,813
Taemin	Released: November 5, 2018 (JPN); Label: EMI Records, Universal Music Japan; Formats: CD, digital download	—	—	2	2	—	—	—	—	JPN: 67,635 (Phy.); JPN: 3,058 (Dig.)
Never Gonna Dance Again	Never Gonna Dance Again: Act 1; Released: September 7, 2020 (KOR); Label: SM Entertainment; Formats: CD, digital download	1	—	11	9	34	—	—	11	KOR: 158,139; JPN: 7,875 (Phy.); JPN: 2,412 (Dig.)
Never Gonna Dance Again	Never Gonna Dance Again: Act 2; Released: November 9, 2020 (KOR); Label: SM Entertainment; Formats: CD, digital download	2	—	29	13	63	—	—	—	KOR: 133,634; JPN: 5,028 (Phy.); JPN: 2,193 (Dig.)
"—" denotes releases that did not chart or were not released in that region.

=== Reissues ===
List of reissues, with selected chart positions and sales
Title	Details	Peak chart positions			Sales
Title	Details	KOR	JPN Hot	US World	Sales
Move-ing	Released: December 10, 2017 (KOR); Label: SM Entertainment; Formats: CD, digital download	3	59	11	KOR: 59,017

=== Compilation albums ===
List of compilation albums, with selected chart positions and sales
Title	Details	Peak chart positions	Sales
Title	Details	KOR	Sales
Never Gonna Dance Again	Released: December 14, 2020 (KOR); Label: SM Entertainment; Formats: CD	8	KOR: 33,921; JPN: 1,661

== Extended plays ==
List of extended plays, with selected chart positions and sales
Title	Details	Peak chart positions									Sales	Certifications
Title	Details	KOR	FRA Dig.	JPN	JPN Hot	TW	UK Dig.	US Heat	US Indie	US World	Sales	Certifications
Ace	Released: August 18, 2014 (KOR); Label: SM Entertainment; Formats: CD, digital download	1	—	13	—	14	—	20	—	2	KOR: 108,163; JPN: 12,280	
Sayonara Hitori	Released: July 27, 2016 (JPN); Label: EMI Records, Universal Music Japan; Formats: CD, Digital download	—	—	3	3	—	—	—	—	—	JPN: 49,190	
Flame of Love	Released: July 3, 2017 (JPN); Label: EMI Records, Universal Music Japan; Formats: CD, digital download	—	—	2	2	1	—	—	—	—	JPN: 52,472	
Want	Released: February 11, 2019 (KOR); Label: SM Entertainment; Formats: CD, digital download, SMC	1	45	15	11	—	59	5	17	4	KOR: 133,668; JPN: 7,134; US: 1,000	
Famous	Released: August 4, 2019 (JPN); Label: EMI Records, Universal Music Japan; Formats: CD, digital download	—	—	1	3	—	—	—	—	—	JPN: 51,927 (Phy.); JPN: 3,922 (Dig.)	
Advice	Released: May 18, 2021 (KOR); Label: SM Entertainment; Formats: CD, digital download	2	—N/a	12	6	—	28	—	—	14	KOR: 132,251; JPN: 5,503 (Phy.); JPN: 2,460 (Dig.)	
Guilty	Released: October 30, 2023 (KOR); Label: SM Entertainment; Formats: CD, digital download	4	—N/a	17	12	—	34	—	—	—	KOR: 279,853; JPN: 5,927 (Phy.); JPN: 1,611 (Dig.)	KMCA: Platinum
Eternal	Released: August 19, 2024 (KOR); Label: BPM Entertainment; Formats: CD, digital download	2	—N/a	11	18	—	48	—	—	—	KOR: 178,385; JPN: 7,144 (Phy.); JPN: 1,324 (Dig.)	
Phase 1: Soft Violence	Released: August 31, 2026 (KOR); Label: Galaxy Corporation; Format: CD, digital download	5	—N/a	—	—	—	—	—	—	—	KOR: 71,072	
"—" denotes releases that did not chart or were not released in that region.

== Singles ==
=== As lead artist ===
List of singles as lead artist, with selected chart positions and sales, showing year released and album name
Title	Year	Peak chart positions						Sales	Album
Title	Year	KOR	KOR Hot	JPN Hot	JPN Dig.	US Pop	US World	Sales	Album
"Danger" (괴도)	2014	5	—	—	—	—	4	KOR: 209,281	Ace
"Drip Drop"	2016	44	—	—	—	—	4	KOR: 70,626	Press It
"Press Your Number" (Note: The Korean version of the song was released on February 23, 2016 and the Japanese version was released as a single on February 26, months before the album Sayonara Hitori was released.)	2016	15	—	79	—	—	3	KOR: 152,210	Press It
"Sayonara Hitori" (さよならひとり) (Note: The Japanese version of the song was released on July 27, 2016 as a track from the album Sayonara Hitori, and the Korean version, titled "Goodbye", was released as a single on August 3 of the same year.)	2016	121	—	39	—	—	14	KOR: 24,426	Sayonara Hitori
"Flame of Love"	2017	—	—	60	—	—	—	—N/a	Flame of Love
"Move"	2017	12	26	—	—	—	4	KOR: 194,526	Move
"Thirsty" (Off-Sick Concert version)	2017	—	—	—	—	—	23	—N/a	Non-album single
"Day and Night" (낮과 밤)	2017	11	64	—	—	—	—	KOR: 54,248	Move-ing
"Eclipse"	2018	—	—	27	9	—	—	—N/a	Taemin
"Mars"	2018	—	—	44	14	—	—	JPN: 7,485	Taemin
"Under My Skin"	2018	—	—	—	—	—	—	—N/a	Taemin
"Want"	2019	31	10	79	—	—	5	—N/a	Want
"Famous"	2019	—	—	35	—	—	—	—N/a	Famous
"2 Kids"	2020	83	74	—	—	—	13	—N/a	Never Gonna Dance Again
"Criminal"	2020	25	13	—	—	—	10	—N/a	Never Gonna Dance Again
"Idea" (이데아; 理想)	2020	23	12	71	—	—	20	—N/a	Never Gonna Dance Again
"Advice"	2021	21	42	—	—	—	4	—N/a	Advice
"Guilty"	2023	13	—	—	—	—	8	—N/a	Guilty
"Sexy in the Air"	2024	9	—	—	—	—	—	—N/a	Eternal
"Horizon"	2024	— (Note: "Horizon" did not enter the Circle Digital Chart, but peaked at number 5 on the component Circle Download Chart.)	—	—	—	—	—	—N/a	Eternal
"Veil"	2025	— (Note: "Veil" did not enter the Circle Digital Chart, but peaked at number 27 on the component Circle Download Chart.)	—	—	—	—	3	—N/a	Non-album singles
"Long Way Home"	2026	—	—	—	—	40	—	—N/a	Non-album singles
"Permission"	2026	—	—	—	—	—	5	—N/a	Phase 1: Soft Violence
"Float"	2026	1	—	—	—	—	—	—N/a	Phase 1: Soft Violence
"Gooey"	2026	— (Note: "Gooey" did not enter the Circle Digital Chart, but peaked at number 19 on the component Circle Download Chart.)	—	—	—	—	—	—N/a	Phase 1: Soft Violence
"—" denotes releases that did not chart or were not released in that region.

=== As featured artist ===
List of singles as featured artist, with selected chart positions and sales, showing year released and album name
Title	Year	Peak chart positions			Sales	Album
Title	Year	KOR	KOR Hot	US World	Sales	Album
"Trap" (Henry featuring Kyuhyun and Taemin)	2013	28	18	5	KOR: 366,691	Trap

=== Promotional singles ===
List of promotional singles, with selected chart positions and sales, showing year released and album name
Title	Year	Peak chart positions		Sales	Album
Title	Year	KOR	KOR Hot	Sales	Album
"Steps" (발걸음)	2014	37	66	KOR: 56,199	Prime Minister and I OST
"Named" (그 이름) (with Jonghyun)	2015	36	—	KOR: 102,429	Who Are You: School 2015 OST
"Because I Love You"	2015	115	—	KOR: 16,662	2015 Gayo Daejun Limited Edition
"My Day"	2021	— (Note: "My Day" did not enter the Circle Digital Chart, but peaked at number 36 on the component Circle Download Chart.)	—	—N/a	Navillera OST
"Draw" (그림)	2023	— (Note: "My Day" did not enter the Circle Digital Chart, but peaked at number 22 on the component Circle BGM Chart.)	—	—N/a	No Office Romance! OST
"Bones"	2024	—	—	—N/a	Stage Fighter (STF) Original, Vol. 3
"—" denotes releases that did not chart or were not released in that region.

== Other appearances ==
List of appearances, with selected chart positions and sales, showing year released and album name
Title	Year	Peak chart positions		Sales	Album
Title	Year	KOR	KOR Hot	Sales	Album
"U" (너란 말야)	2012	107	85	KOR: 28,336	To the Beautiful You OST
"Maxstep" (as part of Younique Unit)	2012	—	—	KOR: 15,420	PYL Younique Volume 1
"Spectrum" (as part of SM The Performance)	2012	43	—	KOR: 58,298	Non-album single
"You Are a Miracle" (with various artists)	2013	32	—	KOR: 53,496	2013 SBS Gayo Daejun Friendship Project
"What's This Feeling"	2017	—	—	—N/a	Final Life OST
"I'm Crying"	2017	—	—	—N/a	Final Life OST
"Pinocchio" (피노키오) (with Bewhy)	2018	— (Note: "Pinocchio" did not enter the Circle Digital Chart, but peaked at number 60 on the component Circle Download Chart.)	—	—N/a	The Call Project No.4
"This Is Your Day" (for every child, UNICEF) (as part of SM Town)	2019	—	—	—N/a	Non-album singles
"Colorful" (with various artists)	2021	—	—	—N/a	Non-album singles
"The Last Christmas" (with various artists)	2024	—	—	—N/a	100RED Winter Special Single
"—" denotes releases that did not chart or were not released in that region.

== Other charted songs ==
List of songs, with selected chart positions and sales, showing year released and album name
Title	Year	Peak chart positions		Sales	Album
Title	Year	KOR	US World	Sales	Album
"Pretty Boy" (featuring Kai)	2014	33	15	KOR: 53,588	Ace
"Ace"	2014	42	25	KOR: 44,513	Ace
"Experience"	2014	62	—	KOR: 30,118	Ace
"Play Me" (소나타)	2014	68	—	KOR: 27,598	Ace
"Wicked" (거절할게)	2014	70	—	KOR: 27,180	Ace
"Soldier"	2016	59	—	KOR: 58,997	Press It
"Already" (벌써)	2016	82	—	KOR: 27,668	Press It
"Guess Who"	2016	94	—	KOR: 24,525	Press It
"Mystery Lover"	2016	101	—	KOR: 25,095	Press It
"Sexuality"	2016	104	—	KOR: 25,072	Press It
"Hypnosis" (최면)	2016	105	—	KOR: 25,044	Press It
"One By One"	2016	108	—	KOR: 23,815	Press It
"Until Today" (오늘까지만)	2016	113	—	KOR: 23,182	Press It
"Artistic Groove"	2019	— (Note: "Artistic Groove" did not enter the Circle Digital Chart, but peaked at number 85 on the component Circle Download Chart.)	—	—N/a	Want
"Shadow"	2019	— (Note: "Shadow" did not enter the Circle Digital Chart, but peaked at number 87 on the component Circle Download Chart.)	—	—N/a	Want
"If I Could Tell You" (featuring Taeyeon)	2021	198	—	—N/a	Advice
"Light"	2021	— (Note: "Light" did not enter the Circle Digital Chart, but peaked at number 38 on the component Circle Download Chart.)	—	—N/a	Advice
"Sad Kids"	2021	— (Note: "Sad Kids" did not enter the Circle Digital Chart, but peaked at number 38 on the component Circle Download Chart.)	—	—N/a	Advice
"Strings"	2021	— (Note: "Strings" did not enter the Circle Digital Chart, but peaked at number 40 on the component Circle Download Chart.)	—	—N/a	Advice
"Blue"	2023	— (Note: "Blue" did not enter the Circle Digital Chart, but peaked at number 70 on the component Circle Download Chart.)	—	—N/a	Guilty
"The Rizziness"	2023	— (Note: "The Rizziness" did not enter the Circle Digital Chart, but peaked at number 71 on the component Circle Download Chart.)	—	—N/a	Guilty
"Night Away" (오늘 밤)	2023	— (Note: "Night Away" did not enter the Circle Digital Chart, but peaked at number 73 on the component Circle Download Chart.)	—	—N/a	Guilty
"She Loves Me, She Loves Me Not"	2023	— (Note: "She Love Me, She Loves Me Not" did not enter the Circle Digital Chart, but peaked at number 74 on the component Circle Download Chart.)	—	—N/a	Guilty
"Not Over You" (제자리)	2023	— (Note: "Not Over You" did not enter the Circle Digital Chart, but peaked at number 75 on the component Circle Download Chart.)	—	—N/a	Guilty
"G.O.A.T"	2024	— (Note: "G.O.A.T" did not enter the Circle Digital Chart, but peaked at number 9 on the component Circle Download Chart.)	—	—N/a	Eternal
"The Unknown Sea"	2024	— (Note: "The Unknown Sea" did not enter the Circle Digital Chart, but peaked at number 10 on the component Circle Download Chart.)	—	—N/a	Eternal
"Say Less"	2024	— (Note: "Say Less" did not enter the Circle Digital Chart, but peaked at number 11 on the component Circle Download Chart.)	—	—N/a	Eternal
"Crush"	2024	— (Note: "Crush" did not enter the Circle Digital Chart, but peaked at number 12 on the component Circle Download Chart.)	—	—N/a	Eternal
"Deja Vu"	2024	— (Note: "Deja Vu" did not enter the Circle Digital Chart, but peaked at number 13 on the component Circle Download Chart.)	—	—N/a	Eternal
"—" denotes releases that did not chart or were not released in that region.

== Videography ==
=== Video albums ===
List of video albums, with selected chart positions and notes
Title	Album details	Peak chart positions		Sales
Title	Album details	JPN DVD	JPN BD	Sales
Taemin The 1st Stage Nippon Budokan	Released: November 29, 2017; Labels: Universal Music; Formats: DVD, Blu-ray; Track listing: 1. "Danger"; 2. "Guess Who"; 3. "Tiger"; 4. "Sexuality"; 5. "Drip Drop"; 6. "Soldier"; 7. "Press Your Number"; 8. "Do It Baby"; 9. "Door"; 10. "Flame of Love"; 11. "Sekaide Ichiban Aishitahito" (世界で一番愛した人); 12. "I'm Crying"; 13. "Sayonara Hitori" (さよならひとり); 14. "Itsuka Kokode" (いつかここで); 15. Inside of "Taemin The 1st Stage Nippon Budokan" (Bonus Movie)	9	5	JPN: 14,223
Taemin 1st Solo Concert Off-Sick <On Track>	Released: July 31, 2018; Labels: SM Entertainment; Formats: SMC; Track listing: 1. "Rise" (이카루스); 2. "Drip Drop"; 3. "Guess Who"; 4. "Sexuality" (Rearranged ver.); 5. "Thirsty" (Off-Sick concert ver.); 6. "Mystery Lover"; 7. "Stone Heart" (미로); 8. "Do It Baby" (Korean ver.); 9. "Flame of Love" (Korean ver.); 10. "Press Your Number"; 11. "One By One"; 12. "Ace"; 13. "Play Me" (소나타); 14. "Crazy 4 U"; 15. "Back to You"; 16. "I'm Crying" (Korean ver.); 17. "Romeo + Juliette" (소년, 소녀를 만나다); 18. "Soldier"; 19. "Wicked" (거절할게); 20. "Pretty Boy"; 21. "Tiger" (Korean ver.); 22. "Danger" (괴도); 23. "Door" (Korean ver.); 24. "Move"; 25. "Goodbye"; 26. "Love"; 27. "Hypnosis" (최면); Bonus Track: Concert Making Film	—	—	—N/a
Taemin Japan 1st Tour ～Sirius～	Released: March 13, 2019; Labels: Universal Music; Formats: DVD, Blu-ray; Track listing: 1. Opening; 2. "Door"; 3. "Move"; 4. "Sexuality"; 5. "Press Your Number"; 6. "Into the Rhythm"; 7. "Love"; 8. "Better Man"; 9. "Eclipse"; 10. "Drip Drop"; 11. "Guess Who"; 12. "Flame of Love"; 13. "Mars"; 14. "What’s This Feeling"; 15. "Danger"; 16. "Thirsty"; 17. "Soldier"; 18. "Rise"; 19. "Tiger"; 20. "Sayonara Hitori" (さよならひとり) (Encore); 21. "Sekaide Ichiban Aishitahito" (世界で一番愛した人) (Encore); 22. "Under My Skin" (Encore); 23. "Holy Water" (Encore)	4	2	JPN: 32,824
Taemin Arena Tour 2019 ～XTM～	Released: November 27, 2019; Labels: Universal Music; Formats: DVD, Blu-ray; Track listing: 1. Opening; 2. "Ace" (Short ver.); 3. "Tiger"; 4. "Press Your Number"; 5. "One By One"; 6. "Want"; 7. "Eclipse"; 8. "Truth"; 9. "Mars"; 10. "Stone Heart" / "Do It Baby"; 11. "Shadow"; 12. "Into the Rhythm"; 13. "Colours"; 14. "Already"; 15. "Artistic Groove"; 16. "Pretty Boy"; 17. "Play Me"; 18. "Drip Drop"; 19. "Slave"; 20. "I'm Crying"; 21. "Itsuka Kokode" (いつかここで); 22. "Sekaide Ichiban Aishitahito" (世界で一番愛した人); 23. "Sayonara Hitori" (さよならひとり); 24. "Holy Water"; 25. "Famous" (Encore); 26. "Move" (Encore); 27. "What's This Feeling" (Encore); 28. "Danger" (Encore)	3	3	JPN: 33,185
"—" denotes releases that did not chart or were not released in that region.

=== Music videos ===
List of music videos showing year released and directors
Title	Year	Director(s)	Ref.
"Danger"	2014	Woogie Kim (GDW)	
"Drip Drop"	2016	Jo Beom-jin (VM Project Architecture)	
"Press Your Number"	2016	Jo Beom-jin (VM Project Architecture)	
"Sayonara Hitori"	2016	Ninomiya "Nino" Daisuke	
"Flame of Love"	2017	Ninomiya "Nino" Daisuke	
"Move"	2017	Yongsoo Kim	
"Thirsty"	2017	Kim Woo-je (ETUI Collective)	
"Day and Night"	2017	THECUT Studio	
"Under My Skin"	2018	Kensaku Kakimoto	
"Want"	2019	Rigend Film Studio	
"Famous"	2019	Kim Jak-young	
"2 Kids"	2020	OUI KIM	
"Criminal"	2020	Jo Beom-jin (VM Project Architecture)	
"Idea"	2020	Jo Beom-jin (VM Project Architecture)	
"Think of You"	2020	Unknown	
"Be Your Enemy"	2020	88 GH	
"Advice"	2021	Yeom Woo-jin	
"Guilty"	2023	Byul Yun	
"Sexy in the Air"	2024	Lee In-hoon (Segaji)	
"Horizon"	2024	VM Project Architecture	
"Veil"	2025	Unknown	
Guest appearances
"Disturbance" (BoA)	2013	Kwon Soon Wook	
"Trap" (Henry Lau)	2013	Unknown	
Other appearances
"The Last Christmas"	2024	Unknown	
