= List of Taemin live performances =

Taemin live performances
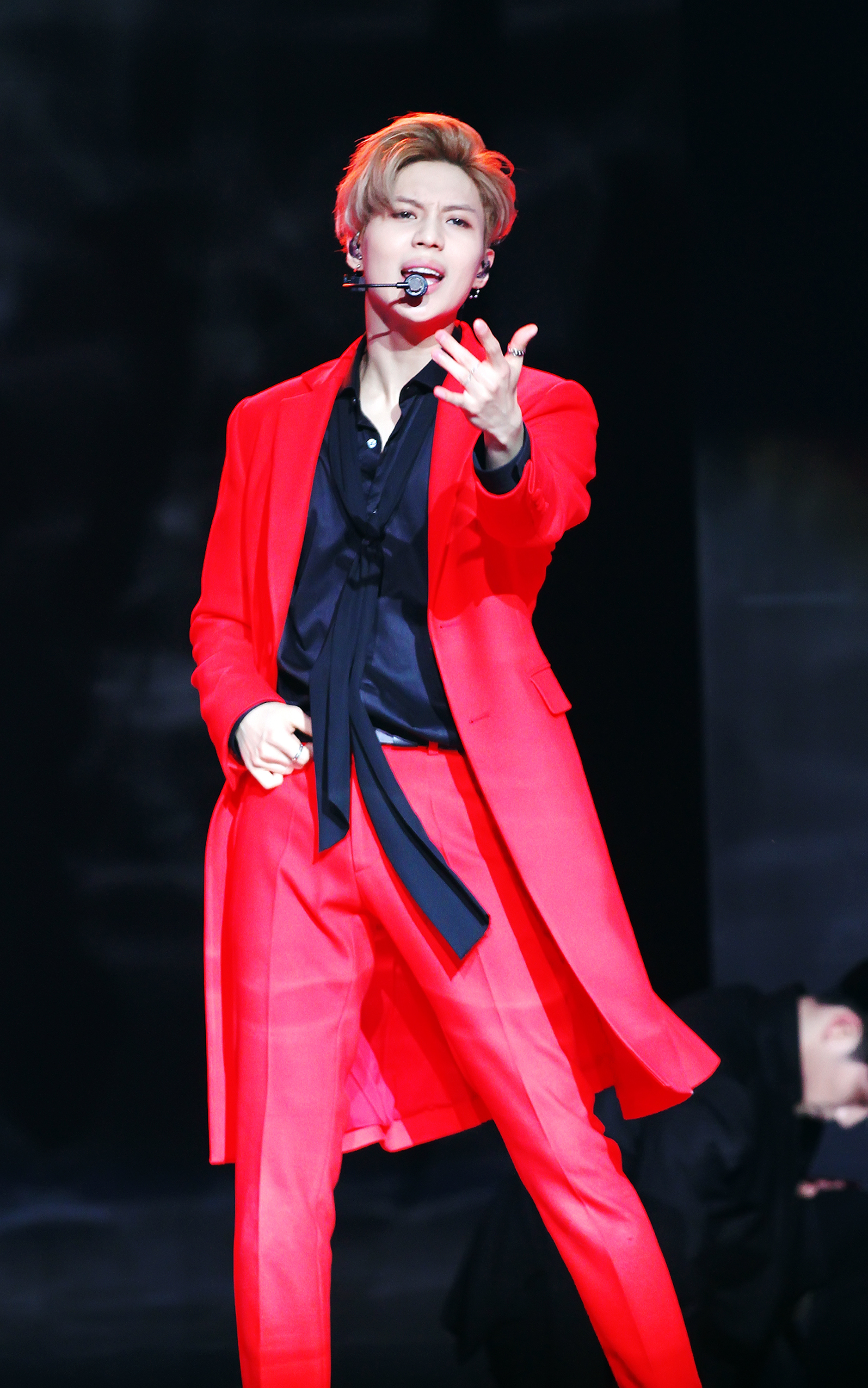
- Taemin performing in 2016
- Concert tours: 7
- Concerts: 2
- Fan meetings: 4
- Showcases: 4
- Company tours: 8
- Other performances: 36

South Korean singer Taemin has headlined five concert tours, two concerts, three fan meetings and four showcases, and additionally participated in eight company tours and twenty three other live performances. A member of the boy band Shinee, he made his debut as a solo artist in 2014 and held his first solo concerts at the Nippon Budokan in Japan in 2017. Later that year, he commenced his first concert tour, Off-Sick, covering South Korea and Japan. In 2018, he embarked on his first Japan tour, Sirius, which attracted 100,000 people. He held two tours concurrently in 2019: T1001101, which had stops in South Korea and Japan, and XTM, his first Japan arena tour. The latter attracted 150,000 spectators. In May 2021, he held an online concert, N.G.D.A. (Never Gonna Dance Again), using the Beyond Live platform. It drew approximately 90,000 viewers across 119 countries.

In 2023, Taemin became the first artist to hold a solo concert at the newly-built Inspire Arena in Incheon. The concert, titled Metamorph, received attention for its innovative stage design featuring a 360-degree rotating platform, and later travelled to Japan. The following year, he staged his first world tour, Ephemeral Gaze, with stops in Asia, North America, South America and Europe. In September 2025, he embarked on another Japan tour, titled Veil.

== Tours ==
Title	Dates	Associated album(s)	Continent(s)	Shows	Attendance	Ref.
Off-Sick	August 25, 2017 – November 26, 2017	Move	Asia	8	—N/a	
Taemin Japan 1st Tour "Sirius"	September 21, 2018 – November 26, 2018	Sayonara Hitori; Flame of Love	Asia	32	100,000	
T1001101	March 15, 2019 – December 31, 2019	Want	Asia	6	—N/a	
XTM Arena Tour	June 8, 2019 – August 12, 2019	Taemin; Famous	Asia	17	150,000	
Metamorph	December 16, 2023 – March 10, 2024	Guilty	Asia	5	—N/a	
Ephemeral Gaze	August 31, 2024 – April 27, 2025	Eternal	Asia; South America; North America; Europe	37	—N/a	
Veil	September 13, 2025 – January 16, 2026	Various	Asia; North America	12	—N/a	

== Concerts ==
Title	Date	City	Country	Venue	Attendance	Ref.
Taemin the 1st Stage Nippon Budokan	July 1, 2017	Tokyo	Japan	Nippon Budokan	28,000	
Taemin the 1st Stage Nippon Budokan	July 2, 2017	Tokyo	Japan	Nippon Budokan	28,000	
Taemin: N.G.D.A. (Never Gonna Dance Again)	May 2, 2021	Seoul	South Korea	—N/a	90,000 (Note: Online viewers)	

== Fan meetings ==
Title	Date	City	Country	Venue	Ref.
LTM with Shinee World	December 24, 2019	Seoul	South Korea	Hwajeong Tiger Dome	
LTM with Shinee World	December 25, 2019	Seoul	South Korea	Hwajeong Tiger Dome	
Re:Act	April 22, 2023 (1)	Seoul	South Korea	Kyung Hee University Peace Hall	
Re:Act	April 22, 2023 (2)	Seoul	South Korea	Kyung Hee University Peace Hall	
Re:Act	April 23, 2023 (1)	Seoul	South Korea	Kyung Hee University Peace Hall	
Re:Act	April 23, 2023 (2)	Seoul	South Korea	Kyung Hee University Peace Hall	
Never-Never	July 12, 2024	Seoul	South Korea	Jangchung Arena	
Never-Never	July 13, 2024 (1)	Seoul	South Korea	Jangchung Arena	
Never-Never	July 13, 2024 (2)	Seoul	South Korea	Jangchung Arena	
Never-Never	July 14, 2024	Seoul	South Korea	Jangchung Arena	
Class-Mate	August 16, 2025	Seoul	South Korea	Ticketlink Live Arena	
Class-Mate	August 17, 2025	Seoul	South Korea	Ticketlink Live Arena	
Class-Mate	August 23, 2025	Hangzhou	China	—N/a	

== Showcases ==
Title	Date	City	Country	Venue	Attendance	Ref.
Press It showcase	February 22, 2016	Seoul	South Korea	SM Town Coex Artium	—N/a	
Press It Showcase in Taiwan	May 21, 2016	Taipei	Taiwan	ATT Show Box	—N/a	
Taemin Premium Showcase Sayonara Hitori	July 18, 2016	Tokyo	Japan	—N/a	8,000	
Taemin Showcase – Want	February 11, 2019	Seoul	South Korea	Sangmyung Art Center	—N/a	

== Company tours and concerts ==
Title	Dates	Continent(s)	Shows	Ref.
SM Town Live World Tour IV	August 15, 2014 – July 26, 2015	Asia	9	
SM Town Live World Tour V	July 16, 2016 – August 14, 2016	Asia	4	
SM Town Live World Tour VI	July 8, 2017 – April 6, 2018	Asia	6	
SM Town Special Stage in Hong Kong	August 5, 2017	Asia	1	
SM Town Live 2018 in Osaka	July 28, 2018 – July 30, 2018	Asia	3	
SM Town Special Stage in Santiago	January 18, 2019 – January 19, 2019	South America	2	
SM Town Live 2019 In Tokyo	August 3, 2019 – August 5, 2019	Asia	3	
SM Town Live Culture Humanity	January 1, 2021	Asia	1	

== Other live performances ==
Title	Date	City	Country	Venue	Ref.
2016 Dream Concert	June 4, 2016	Seoul	South Korea	Seoul World Cup Stadium	
2017 Dream Concert	June 3, 2017	Seoul	South Korea	Seoul World Cup Stadium	
Seoul Fashion Week	October 17, 2017	Seoul	South Korea	Dongdaemun Design Plaza	
Music Bank World Tour in Chile	March 23, 2018	Santiago	Chile	Movistar Arena	
2018 Dream Concert	May 12, 2018	Seoul	South Korea	Seoul World Cup Stadium	
Music Bank World Tour in Berlin	September 15, 2018	Berlin	Germany	Max-Schmeling-Halle	
Korea Times Music Festival	April 27, 2019	Los Angeles	United States	Hollywood Bowl	
2019 Dream Concert	May 18, 2019	Seoul	South Korea	Seoul World Cup Stadium	
Incheon K-pop Concert	October 10, 2020	Incheon	South Korea	—N/a	
TikTok Stage Solo Night	May 6, 2021	Seoul	South Korea	—N/a	
Coupang Play Series match	July 27, 2023	Seoul	South Korea	Seoul World Cup Stadium	
Waterbomb Japan	July 30, 2023	Saitama	Japan	Belluna Dome	
KCON	August 18, 2023	Los Angeles	United States	Crypto.com Arena	
K-Magic Live	October 13, 2023	Manila	Philippines	SM Mall of Asia Arena	
M Countdown in France	October 15, 2023	Paris	France	Paris La Défense Arena	
Supersound Festival	November 19, 2023	Bangkok	Thailand	Impact Challenger Hall	
Amazing Binh Dinh Festival 2024	March 30, 2024	Quy Nhon City	Vietnam	Dam Thi Nai Stage	
Next Generation Live Arena 2024	April 6, 2024	Yokohama	Japan	Pia Arena MM	
Next Generation Live Arena 2024	April 7, 2024	Yokohama	Japan	Pia Arena MM	
Asia Star Entertainer Awards	April 10, 2024	Yokohama	Japan	K-Arena	
Fansland Music Festival	May 5, 2024	Bangkok	Thailand	Impact Exhibition Hall	
SBS Mega Concert 2024	May 19, 2024	Incheon	South Korea	Incheon Munhak Stadium	
Show! Music Core in Japan	June 29, 2024	Saitama	Japan	Belluna Dome	
2024 7-Eleven Kaohsiung Beer Rock Music Festival	July 5, 2024	Kaohsiung	Taiwan	Dream Mall	
Waterbomb Seoul	July 7, 2024	Seoul	South Korea	KINTEX Outdoor Global Stage	
KCON LA 2024	July 26, 2024	Los Angeles	United States	Crypto.com Arena	
SBS Inkigayo Live in Tokyo	October 13, 2024	Tokyo	Japan	Saitama Super Arena	
2024 Korea Grand Music Awards	November 16, 2024	Seoul	South Korea	Inspire Arena	
KCON Japan 2025	May 10, 2025	Chiba	Japan	Makuhari Messe	
K-Wonder Concert	June 14, 2025	Taipei	Taiwan	NTSU Arena	
Show! Music Core in Japan	July 5, 2025	Saitama	Japan	Belluna Dome	
All the Kpop Stage in Macau	August 9, 2025	Macau	China	Venetian Arena	
Waterbomb Singapore	August 30, 2025	Sentosa	Singapore	Siloso Beach	
Music Bank in Lisbon	September 27, 2025	Lisbon	Portugal	MEO Arena	
Dingo Music Concert 'Killing Voice'	October 18, 2025	Seoul	South Korea	Jamsil Arena	
K-Town Festival 3.0	November 1, 2025	Mumbai	India	Inorbit Mall Malad	
Global Spin Live	January 20, 2026	Los Angeles	United States	Grammy Museum	
Hello, Melbourne Festival	March 14, 2026	Melbourne	Australia	Flemington Racecourse	
Coachella	April 11, 2026	Indio	United States	Mojave Stage	
Coachella	April 18, 2026	Indio	United States	Mojave Stage	
British Summer Time Hyde Park	June 28, 2026	London	United Kingdom	Hyde Park	
