= Metamorph (tour) =

2023–24 concert tour by Taemin

- Tour by Taemin
- Location: Asia
- Associated album: Guilty
- Start date: December 16, 2023
- End date: March 10, 2024
- No. of shows: 5

Taemin concert chronology
- N.G.D.A. (Never Gonna Dance Again) (2021); Metamorph (2023–24); Ephemeral Gaze (2024–25)

Metamorph was the fifth concert tour by South Korean singer Taemin, in support of his fourth Korean EP, Guilty. It began on December 16, 2023, at the Inspire Arena in Incheon. It was the first solo concert to be held at the venue, and received attention for its innovative stage production, which featured the first 360-degree rotating platform to be used in a South Korean concert. Additional performances were held in Japan in March 2024.

== Background ==
On October 19, 2023, SM Entertainment announced that Taemin would hold a two-day concert, titled Metamorph, at the newly built Inspire Arena in Incheon. They said that he would deliver an "unprecedented" performance. Taemin was the first artist to hold a standalone concert at the arena, which is the first multi-purpose arena in South Korea and part of a $5 billion resort near Incheon International Airport. It was Taemin's first in-person concert in four and a half years. The title, Metamorph, symbolised "change" and "metamorphosis". Tickets went on sale for fan club members on November 7 and the general public on November 9, via Melon Ticket. All tickets were immediately sold out, resulting in limited-view seating being made available; these tickets also sold out upon release. Additional tickets went on sale on December 15 following the installation of the stage to further accommodate demand. The concert was broadcast online through Beyond Live and Weverse.

On January 10, 2024, it was announced that Taemin would hold three shows in Japan in March. It was Taemin's first concert in Japan since his T1001101 tour in December 2019. It marked his return to the Nippon Budokan, the place where he held his first concert. All tickets were sold out, including limited-view seating.

== Production ==
The concert was directed by SM performance director Hwang Sang-hoon. Taemin performed songs from his new EP, Guilty, as well as previous releases such as "Move", "Criminal", "Want" and "Danger". The concert featured a 360-degree rotating platform, measuring six metres horizontally and six metres vertically, from which Taemin hung upside down while performing his opening song, "The Rizzness". Taemin began by standing upright on the platform, which then tilted downwards until it had rotated 180 degrees, with Taemin's feet fixed firmly to the surface. The platform featured again in Taemin's performance of "Door", which he began hanging upside down and blindfolded. Yonhap reporter Choi Jae-seo compared him to "a chrysalis waiting to become a butterfly". The structure was the first of its kind in South Korea, and Taemin stated that it had been tested thoroughly to ensure its safety. Jang Hyun-ki, general manager of Inspire Arena, told reporters in a press conference that the ceiling of the venue could hold up to 100 tons of weight, with Taemin's concert weighing around 30 or 40 tons.

== Set list ==
This set list is representative of the show on March 8, 2024. It does not represent all concerts for the duration of the tour.

1. "The Rizzness"
2. "Advice"
3. "Black Rose"
4. "Criminal"
5. "Impressionable"
6. "Heaven"
7. "Strings"
8. "Not Over You"
9. "She Loves Me, She Loves Me Not"
10. "Light"
11. "Famous"
12. "Want"
13. "Danger"
14. "Door"
15. "Guilty"
16. "Move"
17. "Night Away"
18. "Blue"
19. "Idea"
20. "Sekaide Ichiban Aishitahito"
21. "I Think it's Love"
22. "Identity"

== Shows ==
List of concerts, showing date, city, country, venue, and attendance
Date	City	Country	Venue	Attendance
December 16, 2023	Incheon	South Korea	Inspire Arena	16,000
December 17, 2023	Incheon	South Korea	Inspire Arena	16,000
March 8, 2024	Tokyo	Japan	Nippon Budokan	30,000
March 9, 2024	Tokyo	Japan	Nippon Budokan	30,000
March 10, 2024	Tokyo	Japan	Nippon Budokan	30,000
