= Ephemeral Gaze =

2024–2025 concert tour by Taemin

- World tour by Taemin
- Location: Asia; South America; North America; Europe
- Associated album: Eternal
- Start date: August 31, 2024
- End date: April 27, 2025
- Legs: 4
- No. of shows: 37

Taemin concert chronology
- Metamorph (2023–2024); Ephemeral Gaze (2024–2025)

Ephemeral Gaze was the sixth concert tour by South Korean singer Taemin, in support of his fifth Korean EP, Eternal. It began on August 31, 2024, in Incheon, South Korea, and concluded on April 27, 2025, in Seoul. It was Taemin's first world tour, spanning shows across Asia, South America, North America and Europe.

== Background ==
Taemin's contract with his agency, SM Entertainment, expired in March 2024. He signed a new contract with BPM Entertainment for his solo promotions. At a fan meeting in July, he announced the release of his fifth EP, Eternal, and revealed that he was planning to embark on his first world tour as a soloist. Taemin said in an interview that he had wanted to go on a world tour since first aspiring to become a singer. On July 19, BPM announced through social media that Taemin would commence his tour, titled Ephemeral Gaze, on August 31, beginning with concerts in Incheon and continuing to various locations across Asia. They said the title was chosen to reflect a performance in which Taemin remains himself despite the varying perspectives of others. At the Incheon shows, Taemin performed songs from Eternal, as well as past releases such as "Move", "Criminal", "Advice" and "Guilty".

On November 1, BPM announced dates for the South American, North American and European legs, covering 14 cities in 10 countries. The North American leg was conducted in collaboration with entertainment technology company Knowmerce. Tickets for the North American concerts went on sale on December 15 and sold out instantly. The South American and European concerts also sold out. Additional tickets for the Houston and Los Angeles concerts went on sale on December 21 to accommodate demand. In January 2025, BPM announced extra stops in Brussels, Manchester and Honolulu, as well as encore concerts in Japan. The tour concluded with shows at the Olympic Gymnastics Arena in Seoul.

== Shows ==
List of concerts, showing date, city, country and venue
Date	City	Country	Venue
August 31, 2024	Incheon	South Korea	Inspire Arena
September 1, 2024	Incheon	South Korea	Inspire Arena
September 7, 2024	Kuala Lumpur	Malaysia	Malawati Stadium
September 14, 2024	Taipei	Taiwan	NTSU Arena
September 21, 2024	Tokyo	Japan	Tokyo Metropolitan Gymnasium
September 22, 2024	Tokyo	Japan	Tokyo Metropolitan Gymnasium
September 23, 2024	Tokyo	Japan	Tokyo Metropolitan Gymnasium
September 28, 2024	Bangkok	Thailand	Idea Live, Bravo BKK
October 5, 2024	Hong Kong	China	AsiaWorld–Expo
October 19, 2024	Fukuoka	Japan	Fukuoka Convention Center
October 20, 2024	Fukuoka	Japan	Fukuoka Convention Center
October 26, 2024	Jakarta	Indonesia	Gelora Bung Karno Sports Complex
November 9, 2024	Singapore		Arena @ Expo
November 24, 2024	Manila	Philippines	Araneta Coliseum
January 4, 2025	Macau	China	Studio City Event Center
January 28, 2025	Mexico City	Mexico	Pepsi Center WTC
February 1, 2025	São Paulo	Brazil	Vibra São Paulo
February 4, 2025	Santiago	Chile	Teatro Caupolicán
February 13, 2025	New York City	United States	King's Theatre
February 16, 2025	Chicago	United States	Chicago Theatre
February 18, 2025	Houston	United States	Smart Financial Centre
February 21, 2025	Oakland	United States	Paramount Theatre
February 23, 2025	Los Angeles	United States	Kia Forum
March 4, 2025	Helsinki	Finland	Helsinki Ice Hall
March 7, 2025	Offenbach am Main	Germany	Stadthalle Offenbach
March 9, 2025	London	United Kingdom	Troxy
March 11, 2025	Tilburg	Netherlands	013 Poppodium
March 12, 2025	Paris	France	Zénith Paris
March 15, 2025	Brussels	Belgium	ING Arena
March 18, 2025	Manchester	United Kingdom	AO Arena
March 22, 2025	Honolulu	United States	Neal S. Blaisdell Center

=== Encore ===
List of encore concerts, showing date, city, country and venue
Date	City	Country	Venue
April 5, 2025	Tokyo	Japan	Ariake Arena
April 6, 2025	Tokyo	Japan	Ariake Arena
April 19, 2025	Kobe	Japan	World Memorial Hall
April 20, 2025	Kobe	Japan	World Memorial Hall
April 26, 2025	Seoul	South Korea	Olympic Gymnastics Arena
April 27, 2025	Seoul	South Korea	Olympic Gymnastics Arena

=== Cancelled shows ===
List of cancelled concerts
Date	City	Country	Reason
November 1, 2024	Abu Dhabi	United Arab Emirates	Escalation of violence in the Middle East
