= Koharu Sugawara =

Japanese dancer, choreographer, and model

- 菅原 小春
- Born: 14 February 1992 (age 34); Sanmu, Chiba Prefecture, Japan
- Occupations: Dancer; choreographer; model
- Years active: 2012–present
- Height: 170 cm (5 ft 7 in)
- Relatives: Yoko Tatejima (sister)
- Website: koharusugawara.com

Koharu Sugawara (菅原 小春, Sugawara Koharu; born 14 February 1992) is a Japanese dancer, choreographer, and model from Sanmu, Chiba Prefecture, Japan.

== Career ==
Koharu Sugawara practiced dancing from around 2002, when she was 10 years old. In her teens, she won various contests such as "Dance Attack" and "Shonen Chample." After graduating from a local public middle school in March 2007, she entered the general course of Seisa Kokusai High School concurrently with dance studies at VAW Eikō High School. After graduating from high school in March 2010, she went to Los Angeles to study dance. In 2013, she collaborated with Nike as a dancer and later also appeared in Nike Athlete's ad campaign.

After returning to Japan, Sugawara worked as a choreographer and backup dancer. She has been a back-up dancer for 2NE1, Girls' Generation, Koda Kumi, Exile, SMAP, Namie Amuro, Rihanna, and Daichi Miura.

== Personal life ==
From September 2016 until November 2017, Sugawara dated actor Haruma Miura.

== Filmography ==
=== Television ===
Year	Title	Role	Notes	Ref.
2015	Jounetsu: Tairiku	Herself	Documentary	
2016	Hit the Stage	Herself	Competition reality show	
2017	7 Rules	Herself	Documentary	
2017	Konya kurabete mimashita	Herself	Variety show	
2017	KanJam Kanzennen Show	Herself	Variety show	
2019	Idaten	Kinue Hitomi	Taiga drama	
2021	Welcome Home, Monet	Yūki Samejima	Asadora	
2023	Ya Boy Kongming!	Mia Iriomote		
2025	Queen of Mars	Maru-B2358	Miniseries	

=== Film ===
Year	Title	Role	Notes	Ref.
2025	Seaside Serendipity			
2025	Ya Boy Kongming! The Movie	Mia Iriomote		

=== Radio ===
Year	Title	Role	Ref.
2016	Sugar Water	Navigator (radio host)	

=== Advertisements ===
- TDK (2015)
- Bose
- Nike: #MinoHodoshirazu
- Android: Jibun o Omoikiri
- Toyota "Vitz" Safety Sense
- Barneys New York
  1. FindYourStrength | Shiseido Altimune | Shiseido

=== Music video ===
Year	Artist	Song	Notes
2012	Namie Amuro	"Yeah-Oh"	
2015	Daichi Miura	"Unlock"	Choreography version
2015	Years & Years	"Desire"	Japanese version
2017	Taemin	"Move"	
2021	Kenshi Yonezu	"Pale Blue"	

=== Choreography credits ===
Year	Artist	Song	Notes
2013	Girls' Generation	"Love & Girls"	
2013	2NE1	"Falling in Love"	
2015	Daichi Miura	"Unlock"	Appeared in music video (choreography version)
2015	Years & Years	"Desire"	Appeared in music video (Japanese version)
2016	Taemin	"Sayonara Hitori"	
2017	Taemin	"Flame of Love"	
2017	Taemin	"Move"	Appeared in music video
2018	Shinee	"Good Evening"	
2020	Taemin	"Criminal"	

== Awards ==
Year	Award	Category	Nominated work	Result
2015	Vogue Japan Women of the Year	None	Herself	Won
