= XTM Arena Tour =

2019 concert tour by Taemin

- Japan tour by Taemin
- Location: Japan
- Associated album: Taemin; Famous
- Start date: June 8, 2019
- End date: August 12, 2019
- No. of shows: 17

Taemin concert chronology
- T1001101 (2019); XTM Arena Tour (2019); N.G.D.A. (Never Gonna Dance Again) (2021)

The XTM Arena Tour, also known as TAEMIN ARENA TOUR 2019 ～X™～, was the second Japanese concert tour by South Korean singer Taemin. It commenced in Sapporo on June 8, 2019, and concluded in Chōfu on August 12, 2019. The tour spanned 17 shows across seven cities, attracting approximately 150,000 attendees.

== Background ==
Taemin released his self-titled Japanese studio album in November 2018. On March 29, 2019, his agency SM Entertainment announced that he would be embarking on his first Japanese arena tour in June, following on from his 2018 tour, Sirius. 14 concerts were planned, covering six cities. Following an appearance on Japanese talk show Shabekuri 007, Taemin announced the tour's title would be XTM (stylised as X™). "X" represents Taemin's fashion, music and dance, with the aim of showing his unique artistry like a trademark. The tour marked Taemin's return to Nippon Budokan, where he held his first solo concert in 2017, and he expressed that he wanted to show his growth. He scaled up his performances in comparison to his previous tour, accounting for the larger venues. Rino Nakasone served as director. Taemin previewed songs from his upcoming Famous EP at the concert. Three additional performances in August were added to the schedule later on to accommodate demand. The final performance was broadcast on Abema on November 10, 2019.

== Set list ==
This set list is representative of the show on August 12, 2019. It does not represent all concerts for the duration of the tour.

1. "Tiger"
2. "Press Your Number"
3. "One by One"
4. "Want"
5. "Eclipse"
6. "Truth"
7. "Mars"
8. "Stone Heart" / "Do it Baby"
9. "Shadow"
10. "Into the Rhythm"
11. "Colours"
12. "Already"
13. "Artistic Groove"
14. "Pretty Boy"
15. "Play Me"
16. "Drip Drop"
17. "Slave"
18. "I'm Crying"
19. "Itsuka Kokode"
20. "Sekaide Ichiban Aishitahito"
21. "Sayonara Hitori"
22. "Holy Water"

Encore

23. "Famous"
24. "Move"
25. "What's This Feeling"
26. "Danger"

== Shows ==
List of concerts, showing date, city, country, venue, and attendance
Date	City	Country	Venue	Attendance
June 8, 2019	Sapporo	Japan	Makomanai Ice Arena	
June 9, 2019	Sapporo	Japan	Makomanai Ice Arena	
June 15, 2019	Fukuroi	Japan	Ecopa Arena	
June 16, 2019	Fukuroi	Japan	Ecopa Arena	
June 19, 2019	Osaka	Japan	Osaka-jō Hall	20,000
June 20, 2019	Osaka	Japan	Osaka-jō Hall	20,000
June 25, 2019	Tokyo	Japan	Nippon Budokan	20,000
June 26, 2019	Tokyo	Japan	Nippon Budokan	20,000
July 5, 2019	Hiroshima	Japan	Hiroshima Green Arena	
July 6, 2019	Hiroshima	Japan	Hiroshima Green Arena	
July 13, 2019	Osaka	Japan	Osaka-jō Hall	20,000
July 14, 2019	Osaka	Japan	Osaka-jō Hall	20,000
August 6, 2019	Fukuoka	Japan	Marine Messe Fukuoka	
August 7, 2019	Fukuoka	Japan	Marine Messe Fukuoka	
August 10, 2019	Chōfu	Japan	Musashino Forest Sport Plaza	
August 11, 2019	Chōfu	Japan	Musashino Forest Sport Plaza	
August 12, 2019	Chōfu	Japan	Musashino Forest Sport Plaza	10,000
Total				150,000
