= Never Gonna Dance Again =

- Cover of the compilation version

Studio album by Taemin
- Released: September 7, 2020
- Studios: Doobdoob (Seoul); SM Big Shot (Seoul); SM Blue Cup (Seoul); SM LVYIN (Seoul); SM SSAM (Seoul); Sound Pool (Seoul)
- Genres: Pop; dance; R&B
- Length: 61:01
- Language: Korean
- Labels: SM; Dreamus
- Producer: Lee Soo-man

Taemin chronology
Famous (2019)	Never Gonna Dance Again (2020)	Advice (2021)

Singles from Never Gonna Dance Again
- 1. "2 Kids" Released: August 4, 2020; 2. "Criminal" Released: September 7, 2020; 3. "Idea" Released: November 9, 2020

Never Gonna Dance Again is the third Korean studio album (fourth overall) by South Korean singer Taemin. It consists of two parts, Act 1 and Act 2, that were later collected together in the repackage album, Never Gonna Dance Again (Extended Ver.).

== Background and release ==
It was initially reported that Taemin was preparing to make a comeback in July 2020. However, the comeback was delayed due to a wrist injury Taemin sustained while practicing choreography. On July 29, 2020, SM Entertainment confirmed that Taemin would soon be releasing his third full album, Never Gonna Dance Again, starting with the release of prologue single "2 Kids" on August 4, 2020. This was followed up by the release of the first half of the album, Never Gonna Dance Again: Act 1, on September 7, accompanied by title track "Criminal". The album features nine tracks, including "Criminal", "2 Kids" and a Korean version of the Japanese song "Famous", previously released by Taemin in 2019. Two remixes of "Criminal" by DJ Minit and Sumin were later released on September 29 as part of SM's iScreaM project.

The second half of the album, Never Gonna Dance Again: Act 2, was released on November 9, 2020, alongside lead single "Idea", which includes vocals by BoA. The album also features the song "Be Your Enemy", a duet with Wendy of Red Velvet. The two "acts" were later released together in an album repackage entitled Never Gonna Dance Again (Extended Ver.) on December 14, 2020, which includes all eighteen tracks.

== Music and lyrics ==
The album featured Taemin's highest level of creative involvement to date. Taemin described it as "a moment of growth for me as an artist," saying, "I just really wanted to emphasize my individual talent and showcase my character as an artist, my own individual style." The album is intended to reflect a turning point in Taemin's career, and themes of identity and rebirth are central to the overarching narrative. Taemin envisioned the series as a "cinematic story," comparing the separate parts to a movie and its sequels that can stand alone but form a complete narrative when brought together.

According to Taemin, "Act 1 is about rebelling against the ordinary and the process of finding a new ego." Lead single "Criminal" is a synthwave song with newtro sounds and a Stockholm syndrome theme. "Black Rose" features rapper Kid Milli, and combines dark and colourful keyboard sounds with lyrics referencing a solar eclipse. "Strangers" is a dark pop song with an oriental melody. It describes the moment of meeting a past lover by chance and pretending to be strangers. "Waiting For" is a medium tempo dance track featuring a violin melody and Spanish guitar adlibs. "Famous" expresses the conflict between the artist's onstage and offstage persona. "Clockwork" is a pop ballad that recalls memories of a former lover by incorporating the ticking sound of a clock. "Just Me And You" is an R&B pop song with a retro tape source, whispering vocals and heavy drum beats. R&B song "Nemo" makes use of rhythmic guitars and evokes a 90s sensibility. The final song on the album is prologue single "2 Kids", and includes lyrics written by Taemin concerning painful memories of love as a child. It is described as an electropop song with warm guitar sounds, and is noted for showcasing a more emotional side to Taemin's vocals in contrast to his usual intense performance style.

"Idea" is inspired by Plato's theory of forms and the allegory of the cave. Taemin described it thus: "instead of 'being trapped in a cave' and living in the shadow of the truth, I want to free myself from the darkness and embark on a journey of enlightenment where I discover a new ego, identity and meaning."

== Track listing ==
Never Gonna Dance Again: Act 1 track listing
No.	Title	Lyrics	Music	Arrangement	Length
1.	"Criminal"	Danke (Lalala Studio)	Lauren Aquilina; Chloe Latimer; Shae Jacobs; Score (13); Megatone (13)	Jacobs; Score (13); Megatone (13)	3:31
2.	"Black Rose" (Korean: 일식; RR: Ilsik; lit. 'Solar Eclipse') (Featuring Kid Milli)	Kim Soo-jin; Kid Milli	Greg Bonnick; Hayden Chapman; Deez; Adrian McKinnon	LDN Noise; Deez	3:39
3.	"Strangers"	Kim Min-ji	Daniel Davidsen; Peter Wallevik; Sarah Barrios; Linnea Södahl	PhD	3:03
4.	"Waiting For" (Korean: 해몽; RR: Haemong; lit. 'Interpretation')	Kim Min-ji	Noah Conrad; Rollo Spreckley; Jake Torrey	Conrad; Spreckley; Torrey; Deez	2:57
5.	"Famous" (Korean version)	Lee Seu-ran	Didrik Thott; Daniel Kim	Daniel Kim	3:00
6.	"Clockwork"	Lee Seu-ran; Bong Eun-young	Britt Burton; Harvey Mason Jr.	Mason	3:47
7.	"Just Me and You"	Mola (Makeumine Works); JQ	Sam Gray; Steve Manovski; Jimmy Conway; Ryan S. Jhun	Gray; Manovski; Conway; Jhun	3:34
8.	"Nemo" (Korean: 네모)	Noday; Aisle; Park Moonchi	Aisle; Park Moonchi; Noday	Park Moonchi; Noday	3:56
9.	"2 Kids"	Jo Yoon-kyung; Taemin	Matt Thomson; Max Lynedoch Graham; Ninos Hanna; Jenson Vaughan; Marlene Strand; James F. Reynolds; Tim Stuart	Arcades; Blur	3:33
Total length:					31:00

Never Gonna Dance Again: Act 2 track listing
No.	Title	Lyrics	Music	Arrangement	Length
1.	"Idea" (Korean: 이데아; Hanja: 理想; RR: Ide-a)	Moon Seol-ri	James Foye III; Austin Owens; Jimmy Claeson; Adrian McKinnon; Tay Jasper	Foye; Owens; TAK	3:14
2.	"Heaven"	Taemin; Yoo Young-jin	Klara Ósk Elíasdóttir; Markus Videsäter; Emanuel "Email" Abrahamsson; Yoo	Email; Yoo	3:02
3.	"Impressionable" (Korean: 유인; RR: Yu-in)	Kim Woo-jung	MNEK; Daniel Davidsen; Peter Wallevik; Lewis Blissett	PhD	3:02
4.	"Be Your Enemy" (featuring Wendy of Red Velvet)	Park Tae-won; Hwang Yu-bin	Noah Conrad; Brooke Tomlinson; David Brook	Conrad	3:35
5.	"Think of You" (Korean: 안아줄래; RR: An-ajullae; lit. 'Will You Hug Me')	Taemin	Max Lynedoch Graham; Matt Thomson; Wilhelm Börjesson; Marcus Holmberg; James F. Reynolds	Arcades	3:18
6.	"Exclusive" (Korean version)	Mola (Makeumine Works); JQ	Fredrik Thomander; Dennis Mansfeld; Dani Paz	Thomander; Paz	3:24
7.	"Pansy"	Jung Young-ah; Taemin	Bram Inscore; Alma Goodman; Darin	Inscore	3:50
8.	"I Think It's Love" (Korean: 사랑인 것 같아; RR: Sarang-in Geot Gat-a)	minGtion	Andrew Choi; Kim Yeon-seo; minGtion	minGtion	3:35
9.	"Identity"	Jo Yoon-kyung	Steven Lee	Steven Lee	3:01
Total length:					30:01

== Charts ==
Chart performance for Never Gonna Dance Again
Chart (2020)	Peak position		
Chart (2020)	Act 1	Act 2	Extended Ver.
Japan Hot Albums (Billboard Japan)	9	14	—
Japanese Albums (Oricon)	11	29	—
Polish Albums (ZPAV)	—	40	—
South Korean Albums (Gaon)	1	2	8
UK Digital Albums (OCC)	34	63	—
US World Albums (Billboard)	11	—	—

== Accolades ==
Year-end lists
Critic/Publication	List	Work	Rank	Ref.
Time	The Songs and Albums That Defined K-Pop's Monumental Year in 2020	Never Gonna Dance Again: Act 2	—N/a	
Rhythmer	10 Best Korean R&B/Soul Albums of 2020	Never Gonna Dance Again	5	
South China Morning Post	The Best K-pop Solo Albums of 2020	Never Gonna Dance Again	—N/a	
MTV	The Best K-Pop B-sides of 2020	"Clockwork"	2	
Rolling Stone India	20 Best K-pop Music Videos of 2020	"Idea"	5	

Music program awards
Song	Program	Network	Date	Ref.
"Idea"	Inkigayo	SBS	November 22, 2020	

== Release history ==
Release history and formats for Never Gonna Dance Again
Edition	Date	Region	Format	Label
Act 1	September 7, 2020	South Korea	CD; digital download; streaming	SM Entertainment; Dreamus Company
Act 1	September 7, 2020	Various	Digital download; streaming	SM Entertainment; Dreamus Company
Act 2	November 9, 2020	South Korea	CD; digital download; streaming	SM Entertainment; Dreamus Company
Act 2	November 9, 2020	Various	Digital download; streaming	SM Entertainment; Dreamus Company
Extended Ver.	December 14, 2020	South Korea	CD	SM Entertainment; Dreamus Company
