= Eternal (Taemin EP) =

- Digital cover

EP by Taemin
- Released: August 19, 2024
- Studios: Doobdoob (Seoul); M Creative Sound (Seoul)
- Genre: K-pop
- Length: 20:57
- Language: Korean
- Labels: BPM; Kakao
- Producer: Taemin

Taemin chronology
Guilty (2023)	Eternal (2024)	Phase 1: Soft Violence (2026)

Singles from Eternal
- 1. "Sexy in the Air" Released: August 19, 2024; 2. "Horizon" Released: August 19, 2024

Eternal is the fifth Korean extended play (EP) by South Korean singer Taemin. It was released on August 19, 2024, through BPM Entertainment. It contains seven songs, including the two lead singles, "Sexy in the Air" and "Horizon". The EP also marks his tenth anniversary as a soloist.

== Background ==
Taemin's solo contract with his agency, SM Entertainment, expired in March 2024. He signed a new contract with BPM Entertainment for his solo promotions. At a fan meeting in July, he revealed that he was planning to release his fifth EP the following month, his first release since switching agencies, and embark on a world tour. On July 29, BPM confirmed that he would release the EP, titled Eternal, on August 19, coming ten months after his previous EP, Guilty. It would mark the tenth anniversary of his solo debut. According to his agency, the title was intended to represent that Taemin would remain the same even in the midst of change. For the first time in his career, Taemin produced the EP himself, participating in every part of the production process, from planning, to songwriting, to music video production.

== Composition ==
The EP contains seven songs of various genres. Opening track "G.O.A.T" is a hip hop song. Lead single "Sexy in the Air" features sharp electric guitar sounds, and expresses a strong sense of identity and desire for change. The other single, "Horizon", incorporates dance and synth-pop. It is an upbeat song with a "dynamic" melody and lyrics about breaking the mould. "The Unknown Sea" has an acoustic sound and "lyrical emotion", "Crush" and "Say Less" belong to the electropop genre, and "Deja Vu" evokes a "dreamy" mood.

== Release and promotion ==
Ahead of the EP's release, Taemin uploaded various promotional materials to his social media accounts, including trailers, concept images and teaser videos. On August 13, he released an album preview video, featuring the album's track list and snippets of each song. Taemin hosted a listening session for fans on August 16 at CGV Yongsan in Seoul. He held an exhibition from August 22 to September 1 at Informal Square in Seongsu-dong. On August 31, he embarked on his first world tour, Ephemeral Gaze, beginning with shows at the Inspire Arena in Incheon.

== Track listing ==
Eternal track listing
No.	Title	Lyrics	Music	Arrangement	Length
1.	"G.O.A.T"	San Yoon	Taemin; Colde; Basecamp; Yukon (Owave)	Colde; Basecamp	2:58
2.	"Sexy in the Air"	Ryan S. Jhun; Znee; Jiin (Znee:Us); Eeeee; Perrie; 9june9	Taemin; Jhun; Dwayne "Dem Jointz" Abernathy Jr.; Racella; Sorana Pacurar; Andre Davidson; Sean Davidson; Jun Seo	Jhun; Dem Jointz; The Monarch	3:14
3.	"Horizon"	Eunhwa (153/Joombas); BBYO; Jungeunki (Lalala Studio)	Taemin; Laurent Marc Louis; R.L. King; Joa; Jacob Aaron (The Hub); Noerio (The Hub)	Laurent Marc Louis; King; Joa; Aaron; Noerio	2:56
4.	"The Unknown Sea"	Znee; Eeeee	Taemin; Jhun; Mich Hansen; Jacob Uchorezak; Samuel Ledet; James William Miller; Sara Davis	Jhun; Cutfather; Ledet; Uchorezak	3:16
5.	"Crush"	Soorin; Znee; Eeeee	Taemin; Jhun; James Daniel Lewis; Daniel Shah; Robbie Jay; Steven Manovski	Jhun; Lewis	2:45
6.	"Deja Vu"	Taemin; Ahn Young-joo; Young	Taemin; Jhun; Sean Fischer; Enrique Maza; Pacurar; Young Chance	Jhun; Fischer	3:13
7.	"Say Less"	Taemin; San Yoon	Taemin; Jhun; Dino Medanhodzic; Jordan Shaw; Sam Merrifield	Jhun; Medanhodzic	2:35
Total length:					20:57

== Personnel ==
- Taemin – vocals, background vocals, producing
- San Yoon – vocal directing (track 1), background vocals (track 1)
- Chae Uk-jin – guitar (track 1), bass (track 1)
- Moon Jun-ho – drums (track 1), synths (track 1)
- Kwon Yu-jin – recording (track 1)
- Oh Dan-young – digital editing (tracks 1, 3, 7), recording (tracks 2–3)
- Gu Jong-pil – mixing (tracks 1, 3, 7)
- Um Se-hyun – engineering for mix (tracks 1, 3, 7)
- Kwon Nam-woo – mastering
- Ryan S. Jhun – vocal directing (tracks 2, 4–7), programming (tracks 2, 4–7)
- Junji – background vocals (tracks 2, 4–5, 7)
- Dwayne "Dem Jointz" Abernathy Jr. – programming (track 2)
- The Monarch – programming (track 2)
- Lee Gyung-won – digital editing (track 2)
- Alawn – mixing (tracks 2, 6)
- PIT300 (Kim Tae-hyung) – vocal directing (track 3)
- B.O. – background vocals (track 3)
- Laurent Marc Louis – guitar (track 3), bass (track 3), drums (track 3), synths (track 3), piano (track 3)
- R.L. King – drums (track 3)
- Jacob Aaron – synths (track 3), piano (track 3)
- Noerio – synths (track 3), piano (track 3)
- Cutfather – programming (track 4)
- Samuel Ledet – programming (track 4)
- Jacob Uchorczak – programming (track 4)
- Jang Min – recording (track 4)
- Kim Min-hee – digital editing (track 4)
- Mezz – mixing (track 4)
- James Daniel Lewis – programming (track 5), mixing (track 5)
- Kim Ji-hyun – recording (tracks 5–7), digital editing (tracks 5–6)
- Young Chance – background vocals (track 6)
- Sorana Pacurar – background vocals (track 6)
- Perrie – background vocals (track 6)
- Sean Fischer – programming (track 6)

== Charts ==
=== Weekly charts ===
Weekly chart performance for Eternal
Chart (2024–2025)	Peak position
Japanese Albums (Oricon)	11
Japanese Combined Albums (Oricon)	23
Japanese Hot Albums (Billboard Japan)	18
South Korean Albums (Circle)	2
UK Album Downloads (Official Charts)	48

=== Monthly charts ===
Monthly chart performance for Eternal
Chart (2024)	Position
South Korean Albums (Circle)	7
