= Criminal (Taemin song) =

- iScreaM Vol. 5: Criminal (Remixes) cover

Single by Taemin

from the album Never Gonna Dance Again
- Language: Korean
- Released: September 7, 2020
- Studio: SM LVYIN (Seoul)
- Genre: Synthwave
- Length: 3:31
- Label: SM; Dreamus
- Composers: Lauren Aquilina; Chloe Latimer; Shae Jacobs; Score (13); Megatone (13)
- Lyricist: Danke (LaLaLa Studio)
- Producers: Shae Jacobs; Score (13); Megatone (13)

Taemin singles chronology
"2 Kids" (2020)	"Criminal" (2020)	"Idea" (2020)

Music video
- "Criminal" on YouTube

"Criminal" is a song recorded by South Korean singer Taemin. It was released as the lead single of his third studio album, Never Gonna Dance Again, on September 7, 2020, through SM Entertainment. A synthwave song with Stockholm syndrome-themed lyrics, "Criminal" was written by Danke, Lauren Aquilina, Chloe Latimer, Shae Jacobs, Score and Megatone, and produced by Jacobs, Score and Megatone.

== Background and release ==
On August 28, 2020, SM Entertainment announced that Taemin would be releasing the first part of his third studio album, Never Gonna Dance Again: Act 1, on September 7, alongside the lead single "Criminal". It was released in the same timeframe as the SuperM album Super One, causing Taemin to split his time between the two projects. Two remixes of the song by DJ Minit and Sumin were released on September 29 as part of SM's iScreaM project.

== Composition ==
"Criminal" is a synthwave song with "newtro" (new retro) sounds and a Stockholm syndrome theme. Taemin described the song as having "a dark, internal feeling". It features narration from news broadcasts in the bridge, an idea that was introduced by Taemin. The song "pulsates with an intoxicating, borderline hypnotic groove", before building to "an explosive moment of catharsis" in the final chorus. The lyrics depict being trapped in a toxic relationship in which Taemin is a victim and yet also complicit. Billboard viewed the song as a continuation of themes previously explored in "Move" (2017) and "Want" (2019). They interpreted it as Taemin embracing the darkness of his alter ego, akin to Dr. Jekyll and Mr. Hyde.

== Critical reception ==
"Criminal" received positive reviews from critics, with many labelling it one of the best K-pop songs of the year. Taylor Glasby of Dazed described it as an "opulent piece of sonic cinema". Crystal Bell of Paper praised Taemin's versatility and artistry, calling him "a master of movement and sensuality". BuzzFeed reporter Emlyn Travis stated, "No one in K-pop is doing it like Taemin". She ranked "Criminal" first in her list of the best K-pop songs of the year. Writing for IZE, Kim Yun-ha praised the explosive energy of the song, highlighting the intensity of the final chorus. According to Marga Buenaventura of CNN Philippines Life, the song "reinforces the idea that among male idols today, Taemin is indeed an ace among aces".

=== Year-end lists ===
"Criminal" on year-end lists
Critic/Publication	List	Rank	Ref.
Billboard	The 20 Best K-Pop Songs of 2020: Critics' Picks	12	
BuzzFeed	Best K-Pop Songs of 2020	1	
CNN Philippines Life	Our Best K-pop Songs of 2020	Placed	
Dazed	The 40 best K-pop songs of 2020	3	
Idology	2020: Top 20 Songs of the Year	Placed	
Paper	The 40 Best K-pop Songs of 2020	3	
Refinery29	Music Saved 2020: The 29 Best Songs Of The Year	Placed	
South China Morning Post	The best 15 singles from K-pop groups in 2020	Placed	

=== Accolades ===
Awards and nominations for "Criminal"
Award ceremony	Year	Category	Result	Ref.
Mnet Asian Music Awards	2020	Song of the Year	Nominated	
Mnet Asian Music Awards	2020	Best Dance Performance – Solo	Nominated	
Mnet Asian Music Awards	2020	Favorite Dance Performance – Male Solo	Won	

== Music video ==
The music video for "Criminal" was directed by Jo Beom-jin of VM Project Architecture, who had previously worked with Taemin on "Press Your Number" (2016) and "Drip Drop" (2016). Jo was handpicked by Taemin and they developed the music video together. In the video, Taemin performs the choreography to the song on various sets, including a lava floor, a "sterile white room" and a setpiece inspired by The Devil's Advocate. The choreography was created by Kasper and Koharu Sugawara. Taemin had collaborated with Sugawara on several of his previous releases, including "Move" and "Want". He begins the choreography with his hands tied, an idea that was included at Taemin's suggestion, and unties the knot with his teeth as the chorus begins. At the song's climax, Taemin utters the line, "Destroy me more," while staring directly at the camera and running a hand through his hair. Following this, the dancers, clothed in red, explode in movement around him, introducing "an element of catharsis". Tassia Assis of Teen Vogue described this as "a surrender to the dark, twisty maze of his own artistry." Billboard praised his use of "visual imagery as an extension" of the music.

== Credits and personnel ==
Credits adapted from the liner notes of Never Gonna Dance Again: Act 1.

Recording

- Recorded at SM Lvyin Studio
- Digitally edited and engineered for mix at SM Big Shot Studio
- Mixed at SM Blue Ocean Studio
- Mastered at 821 Sound Mastering

Personnel

- Taemin – vocals, background vocals
- Danke (LaLaLa Studio) – lyrics
- Lauren Aquilina – composition
- Chloe Latimer – composition
- Shae Jacobs – composition, arrangement
- Score (13) – arrangement, composition, drums, piano
- Megatone (13) a.k.a. Kim Byung-seok – composition, arrangement, bass, guitar
- Deez – vocal directing
- Onestar – background vocals
- Lee Ji-hong – recording
- Lee Min-gyu – digital editing, engineering for mix
- Kim Cheol-sun – mixing
- Kwon Nam-woo – mastering

== Charts ==
Chart performance for "Criminal"
Chart (2020)	Peak position
South Korea (Gaon)	25
South Korea (K-pop Hot 100)	13
US World Digital Song Sales (Billboard)	10

== Release history ==
Release dates and formats for "Criminal"
Region	Date	Format	Version	Label	Ref.
Various	September 7, 2020	Digital download; streaming	Original	SM; Dreamus	
Various	September 29, 2020	Digital download; streaming	Remixes	SM; ScreaM; Dreamus	
