= Komeda =

Komeda may refer to:

- Komeda (band), Swedish band
- Komeda Coffee, Japanese coffeehouse chain
- Krzysztof Komeda (1931–1969), Polish film composer and jazz pianist
- Komeda (crater), crater on the planet Mercury
