= Phase 1: Soft Violence =

- Digital cover

EP by Taemin
- Released: August 31, 2026
- Genre: K-pop
- Length: 33:13
- Languages: Korean; English
- Label: Galaxy

Taemin chronology
Eternal (2024)	Phase 1: Soft Violence (2026)

Singles from Phase 1: Soft Violence
- 1. "Permission" Released: May 22, 2026; 2. "Float" Released: August 31, 2026; 3. "Gooey" Released: August 31, 2026

Phase 1: Soft Violence is the sixth Korean extended play (EP) by South Korean singer Taemin. It was released on August 31, 2026, through Galaxy Corporation. It contains eleven songs, including the singles "Permission", "Float" and "Gooey".

== Background ==
Taemin released his fifth Korean extended play, Eternal, in August 2024, shortly after joining a new company, BPM Entertainment. He attended songwriting camps in Los Angeles to prepare his next EP, originally scheduled for release in spring 2026. He later terminated his contract with his label after they allegedly failed to pay him and his team. Maeil Business Newspaper reported that BPM owed him one billion won in financial settlement, and that he was covering his staff's salaries himself. He signed with a new company, Galaxy Corporation.

In April 2026, Taemin became the first Korean male soloist to perform at Coachella. He performed six new tracks at the festival: "Permission", "Parasite", "Frankenstein", "Let Me Be the One", "Sober" and "1004". In an interview with Billboard, Taemin referenced a quote from the 1919 novel Demian as inspiration for both his Coachella set and his upcoming EP: "The bird fights its way out of the egg. The egg is the world. Who would be born must first destroy a world." He explained: "Something about always pushing and breaking the mold, despite it being an unknown world, resonated with me." He experienced greater creative freedom with this EP, shaping the concept and themes himself rather than choosing from a selection of songs. It explores different aspects of love, including "the love between lovers", often considered a taboo in the K-pop industry.

== Release and promotion ==
Taemin released "Permission" as a digital single on May 22, an autobiographical song about taking control of his life, following his performance of the track at Coachella. He later performed the song again at BST Hyde Park, alongside album tracks "Let Me Be the One" and "1004". On July 23, he uploaded a teaser video to his social media accounts, followed by a poster revealing the album's title, Phase 1: Soft Violence. He released "unfamiliar and bizarre" concept images featuring motifs such as ants, slime, bubblegum and masks. His agency stated the images were intended to show "contrasting sensations" such as "sweetness and bitterness, and softness and violence". A "surreal" music video for "This Is the End" was released on August 11, directed by Taiwanese artist John Yuyi. The album was released on August 31, supported by the singles "Float" and "Gooey". In September, Taemin embarked on a world tour, titled Liminal, beginning with shows at the Jamsil Arena in Seoul.

== Track listing ==
Phase 1: Soft Violence track listing
No.	Title	Lyrics	Music	Arrangement	Length
1.	"Float"	Drew Love; Bava	Softserveboy; Drew Love; Bava	Softserveboy	2:55
2.	"Gooey"	Jonjon (XYXX); Taemin; Bumzu	Ditch David; Ninos Hanna; Jack Samson; Wiljam; CX Lucas; Hautboi Rich; A-Dee	Ditch David; CX Lucas	2:43
3.	"Let Me Be the One"	Kuk Harrell; Hidde Huijsman; Taemin	Kuk Harrell; Hidde Huijsman	Kuk Harrell; Hidde Huijsman	3:26
4.	"Permission"	Taemin; James Abrahart; Rachel West; Isaac Han; Jeasoo Kim; Dae Sung-ho; Chun Jae-young	Yarden Peleg; Taemin; James Abrahart; Rachel West	Yarden Peleg	2:58
5.	"Sober"	Taemin; Shaquille Rayes; San Yoon	Taemin; San Yoon; John McLucas; Jimmy Claeson; Chris Wahle	94K	3:12
6.	"1004"	Taemin; Josh Cumbee; Tricia Battani	G'Harah "PK" Degeddingseze; Josh Cumbee; Tricia Battani; Taemin	G'Harah "PK" Degeddingseze	3:06
7.	"Easy Loving You"	Tatte; Taemin	Anders Nilsen; Maria Mena; Gerard O'Connell; A-Dee	Anders Nilsen	3:19
8.	"Skin"	Alessandra Gazal; Eva Rawlings	Softserveboy; Alessandra Gaval; Eva Rawlings	Softserveboy	2:27
9.	"Parasite"	Taemin; Shaquille Rayes; San Yoon; Molly Moore	Taemin; San Yoon; John McLucas; Molly Moore; Andreas Ohrn	94K	3:21
10.	"Frankenstein"	Taemin; Shaquille Rayes; San Yoon; SeoWoo Chae; Ed Williams	Taemin; San Yoon; John McLucas	94K	3:51
11.	"This Is the End"	Taemin; Shaquille Rayes; San Yoon	Taemin; San Yoon; John McLucas; Jimmy Claeson	94K	1:55
Total length:					33:13

== Charts ==
=== Weekly charts ===
Weekly chart performance for Phase 1: Soft Violence
Chart (2026)	Peak position
Japanese Digital Albums (Oricon)	5
Japanese Download Albums (Billboard Japan)	5
Japanese Western Albums (Oricon)	14
South Korean Albums (Circle)	5
UK Album Downloads (Official Charts)	63

=== Monthly charts ===
Monthly chart performance for Phase 1: Soft Violence
Chart (2026)	Peak position
South Korean Albums (Circle)	31
