= Advice (EP) =

EP by Taemin
- Released: May 18, 2021
- Recorded: 2021
- Studios: Doobdoob (Seoul); SM LVYIN (Seoul); Sound Pool (Seoul)
- Genres: R&B; Dance-pop
- Length: 16:51
- Language: Korean
- Labels: SM; Dreamus

Taemin chronology
Never Gonna Dance Again (2020)	Advice (2021)	Guilty (2023)

Singles from Advice
- 1. "Advice" Released: May 18, 2021

Advice is the third Korean-language extended play (sixth overall) recorded by South Korean singer Taemin. It was released on May 18, 2021, by SM Entertainment, produced by Cutfather, PhD, Moonshine and Ryan S. Jhun, among others. The album contains five songs including the lead single, "Advice".

== Background and composition ==
Taemin released his third studio album Never Gonna Dance Again: Act 2 in November 2020. On May 3, 2021, the singer's label SM Entertainment announced that Taemin would be releasing a new EP the same month, which will mark his final release before his military enlistment. The album's title Advice and cover art were revealed simultaneously. The title track would serve as the lead single of the album. "Advice" was described as an R&B song that employs piano flourishes and a choir arrangement over a trap beat. "If I Could Tell You" is a collaboration with Girls' Generation member Taeyeon. It was described as a "dreamy" R&B-pop song featuring electronic piano and soft synthesizer sounds. "Light" is a dance-pop song produced by Moonshine, featuring groovy beats, synth sounds, and vocal harmonies. "Strings" is an R&B song that is driven by arpeggio guitar riffs, in which Taemin compares himself to a string instrument. "Sad Kids" is a midtempo pop song in a minimalist arrangement of guitars.

== Release and promotion ==
Taemin premiered the title track on his solo concert, Never Gonna Dance Again, on May 2. Image concept teasers were uploaded to Shinee's social media accounts on May 10–13. On May 18, Taemin held a live event on Naver's V Live app to introduce songs from the album. Taemin promoted the title track with televised live performances on various South Korean music programs including M Countdown, Show! Music Core and Inkigayo.

== Reception ==
Writing for the South China Morning Post, Tamar Herman praised Advice for its "creativity and androgynous aesthetic". She described Taemin as charismatic and versatile.

=== Year-end lists ===
Advice on year-end lists
Critic/Publication	List	Rank	Ref.
PopMatters	Top 20 Best K-pop Albums of 2021	20	

"Advice" on year-end lists
Critic/Publication	List	Rank	Ref.
Dazed	The best K-pop tracks of 2021	22	
Insider	The best K-pop songs of 2021	4	
Marie Claire	The 20 Best New K-Pop Songs of 2021	Placed	
NME	The 25 best K-pop songs of 2021	7	
Paper	The 40 Best K-Pop Songs of 2021	16	
Rolling Stone India	21 Best Korean Music Videos of 2021	2	
Teen Vogue	21 Best K-Pop Music Videos of 2021	Placed	
Teen Vogue	The 54 Best K-Pop Songs of 2021	Placed	
The Ringer	The Best K-pop Songs of 2021	6	
Time	The Best K-Pop Songs and Albums of 2021	Placed	

"Light" on year-end lists
Critic/Publication	List	Rank	Ref.
PhilStar Life	Top 21 K-Pop B-Sides of 2021	12	

== Track listing ==
Advice track listing
No.	Title	Lyrics	Music	Arrangement	Length
1.	"Advice"	Jo Yoon-kyung	Mich Hansen; Daniel Davidsen (PhD); Peter Wallevik (PhD); Lucas Secon; Wayne Hector	Cutfather; PhD; Score (13)	3:11
2.	"Light"	Jeon Gan-di	Jonatan Gusmark (Moonshine); Ludvig Evers(Moonshine); Adrian McKinnon	Moonshine	3:19
3.	"If I Could Tell You" (featuring Taeyeon)	Seo Ji-eum	Peter Wallevik (PhD); Rudy Spiro; Josh Wood	PhD	3:17
4.	"Strings"	Hwang Ji-won	Ryan S. Jhun; Roel Rats; Joelina Drews; Vito Kovach; Marcia Sondeijker	Ryan S. Jhun; Roel Rats	3:40
5.	"Sad Kids"	Luvssong	Ryan S. Jhun; Thomas Jones; Reuben Gray	Squar (Blur); Wooon (Blur)	3:21
Total length:					16:51

== Charts ==
=== Weekly charts ===
Weekly chart performance for Advice
Chart (2021)	Peak position
Finnish Physical Albums (Suomen virallinen lista)	10
Japanese Albums (Oricon)	12
Japan Hot Albums (Billboard Japan)	6
South Korean Albums (Gaon)	2
UK Album Downloads (Official Charts)	28
US World Albums (Billboard)	14

=== Monthly charts ===
Monthly chart performance for Advice
Chart (2021)	Peak position
Japanese Albums (Oricon)	35
South Korean Albums (Gaon)	6

=== Year-end charts ===
Year-end chart performance for Advice
Chart (2021)	Position
South Korean Albums (Gaon)	75

== Sales ==
Overall sales for Advice
Region	Sales
South Korea	134,904

== Release history ==
Release history and formats for Advice
Region	Date	Format	Label
South Korea	May 18, 2021	CD	SM; Dreamus
Various	May 18, 2021	Digital download; streaming	SM
