= Ace (EP) =

- Digital/white cover

EP by Taemin
- Released: August 18, 2014
- Studios: Iconic (Seoul); InGrid (Seoul); SM Blue Cup (Seoul); SM Blue Ocean (Seoul); SM Yellow Tail (Seoul); Sound Pool (Seoul)
- Genres: K-pop; dance
- Length: 20:31
- Language: Korean
- Labels: SM; KT Music

Taemin chronology
Ace (2014)	Press It (2016)

Singles from Ace
- 1. "Danger" Released: August 18, 2014

Ace is the debut extended play by South Korean singer Taemin. It was released by SM Entertainment on August 18, 2014. "Danger" was released as the lead single.

== Background and release ==
On August 11, 2014, SM Entertainment announced Taemin would release an EP titled Ace on August 18. On August 13, a highlight medley video from the EP was uploaded to YouTube. The official music video for the lead single, titled "Danger", came out on August 15 and was directed by Kim Sung-wook, who said that through the video he aimed to explore "the themes of masculinity".

== Composition ==
The song "Danger" was composed by Thomas Troelsen, who also wrote the theme song for the World Cup in Brazil. On radio show Blue Night Radio, a listener asked Taemin, "I liked the shooting sound in your music program performances. Why isn't it included in the digital version [of the song]?" Taemin said, "It was added right before performing on a music program as effect sounds for performance. It's not included because it may damage the musical completion of the song." Another listener asked, "'Danger' has a Michael Jackson feel. Did you have it in mind while working on the song?". To this, Taemin replied, "The song was composed abroad and bought. It wasn't like our goal or role model but just happened so in the process. The company thought it would suit me well, and it's not a style I dislike."

The song's choreography was created by Ian Eastwood. Shinee member Jonghyun also added that he heard from the managers that after seeing Taemin dance, "I heard he found it amazing for you to copy him so well." Eastwood says of the song is "...like Michael Jackson" and pays homage to Jackson's unique dance moves and that Taemin seems to understand what Jackson's performance means.

== Reception ==
Ace reached number one on the weekly and monthly Gaon Album Chart, and number two on Billboard's World Albums Chart. "Danger" reached number five on the weekly Gaon Digital Chart. At South Korea's annual music awards, Ace won the Album Bonsang at the 29th Golden Disc Awards, and received further nominations at the Gaon Chart K-Pop Awards and Seoul Music Awards.

Korean music publication Weiv described the track "Danger" as "[...] a song that showcases the bright sense of Thomas Troelsen good at using multiple tracks, stands out. Most of all, it is a rare song among recent SM songs which doesn't tire you after many replays." In a review for the publication, Park Jun-woo said that the EP showed that Taemin had become an adult, contrasting with his image as the youngest Shinee member. He observed that it was unusual for a member of an SM group to release a solo album. IZE said "the young mysterious thief character with light moves but serious business came to life with Taemin's performance." IZM reviewer Jeong Yu-na noted the influence of Michael Jackson and felt that the EP displayed Taemin's growth as a vocalist. She particularly highlighted "Danger", which she thought created a synergistic effect when combined with the choreography, and "Pretty Boy", which she described as a "hidden weapon". She explained that collaborating with Kai allowed them both to overcome their weaknesses.

== Track listing ==
Ace track listing
No.	Title	Lyrics	Music	Arrangement	Length
1.	"Ace"	Max Changmin	Daniel "Obi" Klein; Charli Taft; Deez; Ylva Dimberg (The Kennel)	Daniel "Obi" Klein; Deez	3:58
2.	"Danger" (Korean: 괴도; RR: Goedo)	Seo Ji-eum	Thomas Troelsen; Mikkel Remee Sigvardt	Thomas Troelsen; Mikkel Remee Sigvardt; Command Freaks (Iconic Sounds)	3:11
3.	"Experience"	Hong Ji-yoo	Winston Sela; Marcus Brosch	Jake K (ARTiffect Music); Tesung Kim (Iconic Sounds)	3:13
4.	"Pretty Boy" (featuring Kai of Exo (Note: Credited as "Kai of Exo-K"))	Jonghyun	Daniel Caesar (Caesar & Loui); Ludwig Lindell (Caesar & Loui); Ylva Dimberg (The Kennel)	Caesar & Loui (The Kennel)	3:43
5.	"Wicked" (Korean: 거절할게; RR: Geojeolhalge)	Kenzie	Kenzie; Teddy Riley (Red Rocket); Lee Hyun-seung (Red Rocket); Dominic "DOM" Rodriguez (Red Rocket); Andreas "Mage" Maggiani (Devine Channel)	Kenzie; Red Rocket; Devine Channel	3:25
6.	"Play Me" (Korean: 소나타; RR: Sonata)	Min Yeon-jae	Harvey Mason Jr. (The Underdogs); Damon Thomas (The Underdogs); Mike Daley; Adonis Shropshire	The Underdogs; Mike Daley; Adonis Shropshire	3:01
Total length:					20:31

== Charts ==
=== Weekly charts ===
Weekly chart performance for Ace
Chart (2014)	Peak position
Japanese Albums (Oricon)	13
South Korean Albums (Gaon)	1
Taiwanese Albums (G-Music)	14
US Heatseekers Albums (Billboard)	20
US World Albums (Billboard)	2

=== Monthly charts ===
Monthly chart performance for Ace
Chart (2014)	Peak position
South Korean Albums (Gaon)	1

=== Year-end charts ===
Year-end chart performance for Ace
Chart (2014)	Position
South Korean Albums (Gaon)	23

== Sales and certifications ==
Sales for Ace
Chart	Amount
Gaon physical sales	97,438
Oricon physical sales	5,105

== Awards and nominations ==
Awards and nominations for Ace
Ceremony	Year	Category	Result	Ref.
Gaon Chart K-Pop Awards	2015	Album of the Year	Nominated	
Golden Disc Awards	2015	Album Bonsang (Main Prize)	Won	
Golden Disc Awards	2015	Album Daesang (Grand Prize)	Nominated	
Seoul Music Awards	2015	Bonsang (Main Prize)	Nominated	

Music program awards
Song	Program	Date	Ref.
"Danger"	Music Bank	August 29, 2014	
"Danger"	Show! Music Core	August 30, 2014	

== Release history ==
Release history and formats for Ace
Region	Date	Format	Label	Ref.
South Korea	August 18, 2014	CD; digital download; streaming	SM Entertainment; KT Music	
Various	August 18, 2014	Digital download; streaming	SM Entertainment	
Taiwan	September 26, 2014	CD	Avex Taiwan	
