= Famous (Taemin EP) =

- Digital/regular cover

EP by Taemin
- Released: August 4, 2019
- Studio: Doobdoob (Seoul); Oden (Tokyo); Victor (Tokyo)
- Genre: J-pop
- Length: 20:42
- Language: Japanese
- Label: EMI; UMJ
- Producer: Nozumu Tsuchiya; Lee Soo-man

Taemin chronology
Want (2019)	Famous (2019)	Never Gonna Dance Again (2020)

Singles from Famous
- 1. "Famous" Released: July 26, 2019

Famous is the third Japanese extended play (fifth overall) by South Korean singer Taemin. It was released digitally on August 4, 2019, with a physical release on August 28, 2019, through EMI Records Japan and Universal Music Japan. The lead single and title track "Famous" was released on July 26, 2019, along with its music video. Taemin promoted the album with the XTM Arena Tour.

== Promotion ==
The lead single and title track "Famous" was released alongside its music video on July 26, 2019. The music video contains red imagery, including blood dripping as well as Taemin lying on red fabric and eating an apple. A making-of documentary was released several days later. In addition to Taemin's Japanese arena tour and release of the music video, pop-up stores were opened in four locations in Japan on August 3, 2019, selling limited-edition Taemin merchandise. The album sold 54,305 copies during its first week of release according to Billboard Japan and was ranked first on both the weekly and daily Oricon album charts. This was Taemin's first release to reach first place on the Oricon weekly album chart.

== Track listing ==
Famous track listing
No.	Title	Lyrics	Music	Arrangement	Length
1.	"Famous"	Kami Kaoru	Didrik Thott; Daniel Kim	Daniel Kim	3:00
2.	"Slave"	Junji Ishiwatari	Daniel Kim; Takey (Strike)	Daniel Kim	3:28
3.	"Tease"	MEG.ME	Darren "Baby Dee Beats" Smith; Daniel Kim	Daniel Kim	3:29
4.	"Exclusive"	STY (Digz Inc.)	Fredrik Thomander; Dennis Mansfeld; Dani Paz	Chu Dae-kwan (MonoTree)	3:23
5.	"It's You"	STY (Digz Inc.)	Maria Marcus; Andrew Choi (ADC Music); minGtion (ADC Music)	Maria Marcus	4:03
6.	"Colours"	Sara Sakurai (T's Music)	Warren David Meyers (Audiofreaks); Scott Russell Stoddart (Audiofreaks); Kyler Niko (InnerV8 Musiq)	Audiofreaks	3:19
Total length:					20:42

== Charts ==
Chart performance for Famous
Chart (2019)	Peak position
Japanese Albums (Oricon)	1
Japan Hot Albums (Billboard Japan)	3
