= Guilty (EP) =

- Digital cover

EP by Taemin
- Released: October 30, 2023
- Recorded: 2023
- Studios: Seoul; SM Big Shot (Seoul); SM Starlight (Seoul); SM SSAM (Seoul); SM Yellow Tail (Seoul)
- Genres: Pop; Hip hop
- Length: 18:52
- Language: Korean
- Labels: SM; Kakao
- Producers: Theo & the Climb; Ludvig Evers; Gingerbread; LittGLoss; Inverness; MZMC; Joseph Pepe; Pink Slip; Gray Trainer; Dave Villa

Taemin chronology
Advice (2021)	Guilty (2023)	Eternal (2024)

Singles from Guilty
- 1. "Guilty" Released: October 30, 2023

Guilty is the fourth Korean-language extended play (EP) by South Korean singer Taemin. It was released on October 30, 2023, through SM Entertainment. The EP is Taemin's first release since being discharged from military service. It consists of six songs, including the lead single, "Guilty".

== Background ==
Taemin's third Korean EP, Advice, was released in May 2021, shortly prior to his mandatory enlistment in the South Korean military. He completed his military service in April 2023. On October 10, SM Entertainment confirmed that Taemin would release his fourth EP later that month, bringing his two-year hiatus to an end. In an interview with Luxury magazine, Taemin said that he took inspiration for the EP from Georges Bataille's 1957 book L'Erotisme. He stated that it would reflect on past chapters of his career, and described it as "an album where I walk on a tightrope to see how far I can go".

== Composition ==
The EP contains six songs of various genres. Lead single "Guilty" describes a selfish love that hurts others, incorporating strings and "dynamic" synths. "The Rizzness" is a hip hop track with 808 bass kick, strong synth bass, organ and electric guitar tremolo sounds. The song implores those who are easily swayed by the words of others to listen to their own voices. "She Loves Me, She Loves Me Not" is a hip hop-based song that compares the moment love ends to the wilting of flower petals. It utilises guitar riffs and retro synth sounds to create a lonely atmosphere. Alternative pop song "Not Over You" features "dreamy" chords, rhythmic drums and emotional vocals. It is about being unable to accept a break-up, and expresses feelings of suffering and longing. "Night Away" uses a soft guitar melody and synths to evoke warmth. The lyrics describe happy moments with a lover. Finally, "Blue" contains a hopeful message, likening the realisation of long-awaited dreams to blue light.

== Release and promotion ==
Guilty was announced on October 10, 2023, through the release of a teaser image showing a person's feet stood next to a white T-shirt strewn across the floor. Pre-orders began the same day. On October 13, Taemin uploaded a "photo dump" to social media, depicting scenery such as deserts, swimming pools and streets. He released a variety of online promotional content, including mood clips, teaser images and trailers. Newspaper sheets containing the album artwork were distributed throughout Seoul from October 25 to October 27. Taemin hosted a livestream through various social media platforms on October 30 to count down to the album's release. He held a concert titled Metamorph at the Inspire Arena in Incheon in December.

== Critical reception ==
Year-end lists for Guilty
Critic/Publication	List	Rank	Ref.
Paste	The 20 Best K-pop Albums of 2023	14	

== Track listing ==
Guilty track listing
No.	Title	Lyrics	Music	Arrangement	Length
1.	"Guilty"	Park Tae-won	Jonatan Gusmark; Ludvig Evers; Kole; Maxx Song; Kriz	Moonshine	3:10
2.	"The Rizzness"	Lee Hyung-seok (PNP)	Manifest; JBach; Landon Sears; Kyle Buckley; Charles Roberts Nelsen; MZMC	Pink Slip; Inverness; MZMC	2:53
3.	"She Loves Me, She Loves Me Not"	Lee Hyung-seok	Tony Ferrari; Joseph Pepe; Gray Trainer; Barry Cohen	Pepe; Trainer; Gingerbread	3:02
4.	"Not Over You" (제자리; Jejari; lit. 'Same Place')	Lee Seu-ran	Mathias Holsaae; Kristoffer Fuglsang Mortensen; Malte Ebert; Gavin Brown	LittGloss	3:33
5.	"Night Away" (오늘 밤; Oneul Bam; lit. 'Tonight')	Jo Yoon-kyung	Dave Villa; Breland; Maddy Simmen; TMM	Villa	2:56
6.	"Blue"	Lee O-neul; Ji-he	Aaron Berton; Matt Crawford; Lucas Szulansky; Will Jay	Theo & The Climb	3:18
Total length:					18:52

== Personnel ==
- Taemin – vocals, background vocals
- Deez – vocal directing (track 1)
- Kriz – background vocals (track 1)
- Kole – background vocals (track 1)
- Park In-yeong – strings arrangement (track 1), string recording directing (track 1), strings conducting (track 1)
- Moon Jeong-jae – string recording directing (track 1)
- SM Classics Town Orchestra – strings (track 1)
- Jeong Yu-ra – recording, digital editing (tracks 1–2, 5), mixing (track 5)
- Jeong Gi-hong – recording (track 1)
- Choi Da-in – recording (track 1)
- Lee Chan-mi – recording (track 1)
- Kim Cheol-sun – mixing (track 1)
- Rick Bridges – vocal directing (track 2)
- Manifest – background vocals (track 2)
- Landon Sears – background vocals (track 2)
- Lee Min-gyu – digital editing (track 2), recording (tracks 3, 6)
- Jeong Eui-seok – mixing (track 2)
- Maxx Song – vocal directing (track 3)
- Oiaisle – background vocals (tracks 3, 6)
- Junny – background vocals (tracks 3, 6)
- Lee Ji-hong – digital editing (track 3)
- An Chang-gyu – digital editing (track 3)
- Woo Min-jeong – digital editing (tracks 3, 6)
- Gu Jong-pil – mixing (tracks 3–4), Dolby Atmos mixing
- 4bout – vocal directing (track 4)
- No Min-ji – recording (track 4), digital editing (tracks 4, 6)
- minGtion – vocal directing (track 5)
- Breland – background vocals (track 5)
- Kim Jin-hwan – vocal directing (track 6)
- Will Jay – background vocals (track 6)
- Lucas Szulansky – background vocals (track 6)
- Kang Eun-ji – recording (track 6)
- Nam Gung-jin – mixing (track 6)
- Kwon Nam-woo – mastering

== Charts ==
=== Weekly charts ===
Weekly chart performance for Guilty
Chart (2023)	Peak position
Japanese Albums (Oricon)	17
Japanese Combined Albums (Oricon)	19
Japanese Hot Albums (Billboard Japan)	13
Polish Albums (ZPAV)	96
South Korean Albums (Circle)	4
UK Album Downloads (Official Charts)	34

=== Monthly charts ===
Monthly chart performance for Guilty
Chart (2023)	Position
Japanese Albums (Oricon)	37
South Korean Albums (Circle)	10

=== Year-end charts ===
Year-end chart performance for Guilty
Chart (2023)	Position
South Korean Albums (Circle)	87

== Certifications ==
Certifications for Guilty
Region	Certification	Certified units/sales
South Korea (KMCA)	Platinum	250,000^{^}
^{^} Shipments figures based on certification alone.

== Accolades ==
Music program awards
Song	Program	Date	Ref.
"Guilty"	Show! Music Core	November 11, 2023	

== Release history ==
Release history for Guilty
Region	Date	Format	Label
South Korea	October 30, 2023	CD	SM; Kakao
Various	October 30, 2023	Digital download; streaming	SM
