= Taemin =

South Korean singer and actor (born 1993)

- Taemin in June 2026
- Born: Lee Tae-min; July 18, 1993 (age 33); Seoul, South Korea
- Education: Myongji University
- Occupations: Singer; actor
- Musical career
- Genres: K-pop; J-pop; R&B
- Instrument: Vocals
- Years active: 2008–present
- Labels: SM; Universal Japan; BPM; Galaxy Corporation
- Member of: Shinee; SuperM
- Formerly of: SM Town; Younique Unit; SM The Performance
- Website: Official website

Korean name
- Hangul: 이태민
- RR: I Taemin
- MR: I T'aemin

Lee Tae-min (Korean: 이태민; born July 18, 1993), known mononymously as Taemin, is a South Korean singer and actor. He debuted as a member of the South Korean boy band Shinee in May 2008 and the supergroup SuperM in 2019, both under SM Entertainment, and has subsequently been labeled by media outlets as the "Idol's Idol" due to the large number of idols citing him as an inspiration. As an actor, Taemin's first role was as Junsu in the 2009 MBC comedy Hilarious Housewives.

Taemin debuted as a soloist in 2014 with the release of his first extended play (EP), Ace. It peaked at number one on the South Korean Gaon Album Chart, and its lead single "Danger" reached number five on the Gaon Digital Chart. His first studio album, Press It (2016), also charted at number one on the Gaon Album Chart. Taemin made his solo debut in Japan in July 2016 with the release of his second EP, Sayonara Hitori. His third EP, Flame of Love, was released a year later.

In October 2017, Taemin released his second Korean studio album, Move, and the title track gained attention for its distinctive choreography. In 2018, Taemin released his first Japanese studio album, Taemin, and embarked on his first Japanese tour, named Sirius. His third Korean studio album, Never Gonna Dance Again (2020), led by singles "Criminal" and "Idea", was widely recognized by critics as one of the best K-pop releases of the year. He followed this with the EPs Advice (2021), Guilty (2023), Eternal (2024) and Phase 1: Soft Violence (2026).

== Career ==
=== 2008–2013: Career beginnings ===
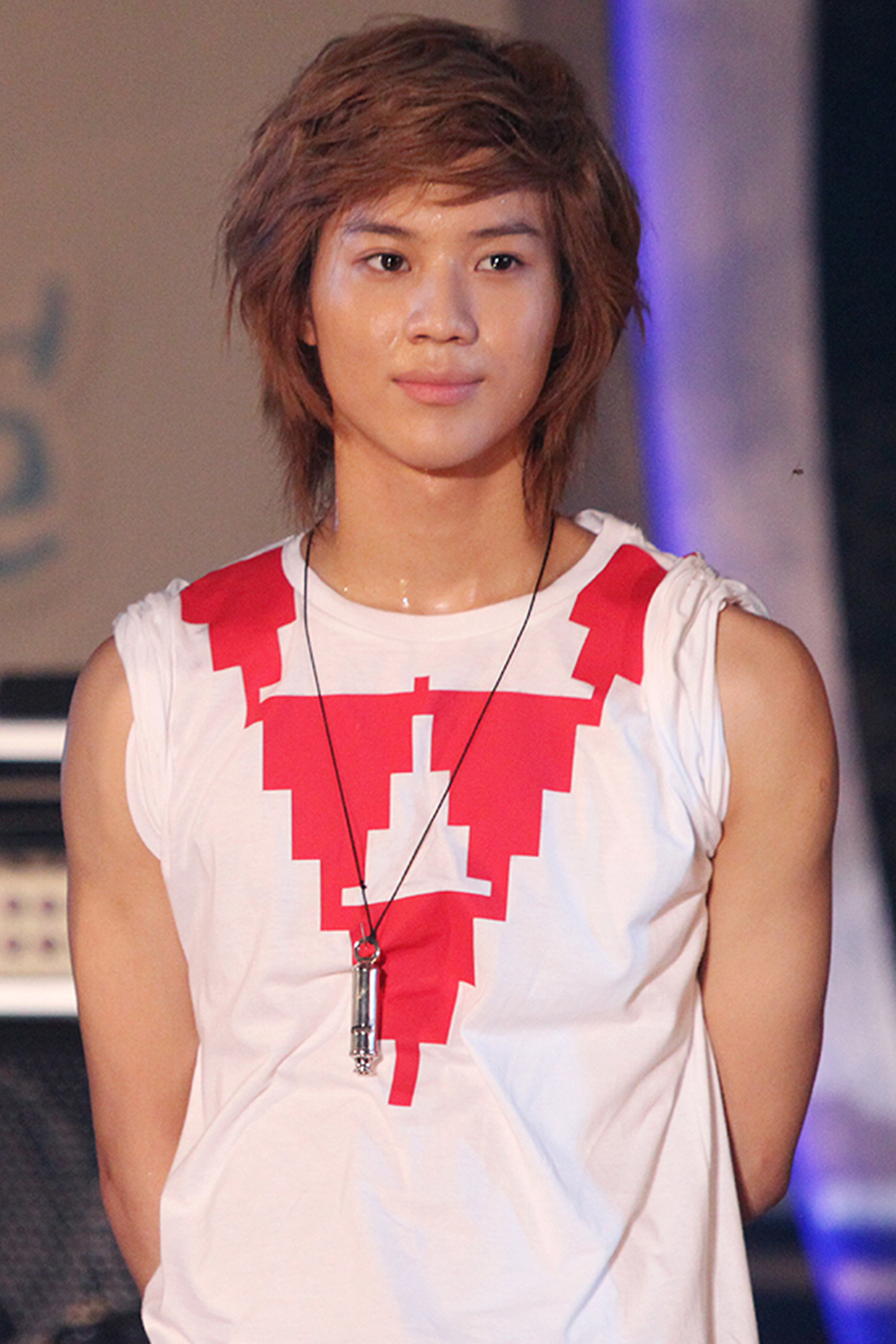
Taemin in 2010

Lee Tae-min was born on July 18, 1993 in Seoul. He joined SM Entertainment as a trainee with talent in singing and dancing and was chosen to debut as a member of Shinee in 2008 at age 14. The group officially debuted on May 25, 2008, performing on the music program Inkigayo on SBS. Taemin made his acting debut the following year in MBC's comedy Hilarious Housewives as Junsu. In January 2012, he voiced the main character in the Korean version of the animated film Koala Kid. He also joined the singing competition program Immortal Songs 2 as a contestant.

On September 19, 2012, Taemin released his first soundtrack song (OST), "U", for the drama To The Beautiful You. On October 16, it was announced that Taemin, alongside Super Junior's Eunhyuk and Super Junior-M's Henry, Girls' Generation's Hyoyeon, and Exo's Kai and Luhan would participate as a six-member dance team for the Veloster theme song "Maxstep", the collaboration between SM Entertainment and Hyundai. A video teaser of the song premiered at the PYL Younique Show on October 17.

In April 2013, SM Entertainment revealed that Taemin would be taking part in the reality variety show We Got Married with Son Na-eun as his partner, replacing the previous couple Kwanghee and Sunhwa. In the same year, Taemin made a three-episode appearance on the drama Dating Agency: Cyrano as idol singer Yang Ho-yeol with the stage name Ray. In June, he featured in Super Junior-M's Henry solo song "Trap" alongside Super Junior's Kyuhyun. In December, Taemin participated in the soundtrack of the series Prime Minister & I, providing vocals for the track "Footsteps", the first track to be previewed on the series, at the end of its third episode.

=== 2014–2016: Solo debut with Ace, Press It and Sayonara Hitori ===
In May 2014, Taemin appeared in the musical Goong in Japan. On August 18, 2014, Taemin made his solo debut with the release of his first extended play (EP) Ace. The six-song EP peaked at number one on South Korea's Gaon Album Chart, while its lead single "Danger" reached number five on the Gaon Digital Chart. The music video for "Danger" was released on August 16, choreographed by American choreographer Ian Eastwood and SM Entertainment's performance directing team BeatBurger. Taemin traveled to Los Angeles to learn the routine.

On February 3, 2015, Taemin was confirmed for the cast of the first season of Match Made in Heaven Returns. On April 14, Taemin joined JTBC's program Off to School as a cast member. On June 1, he released the song "That Name" in collaboration with bandmate Jonghyun for the soundtrack of KBS2's Who Are You: School 2015. The song debuted at number 36 on the Gaon Digital Chart.

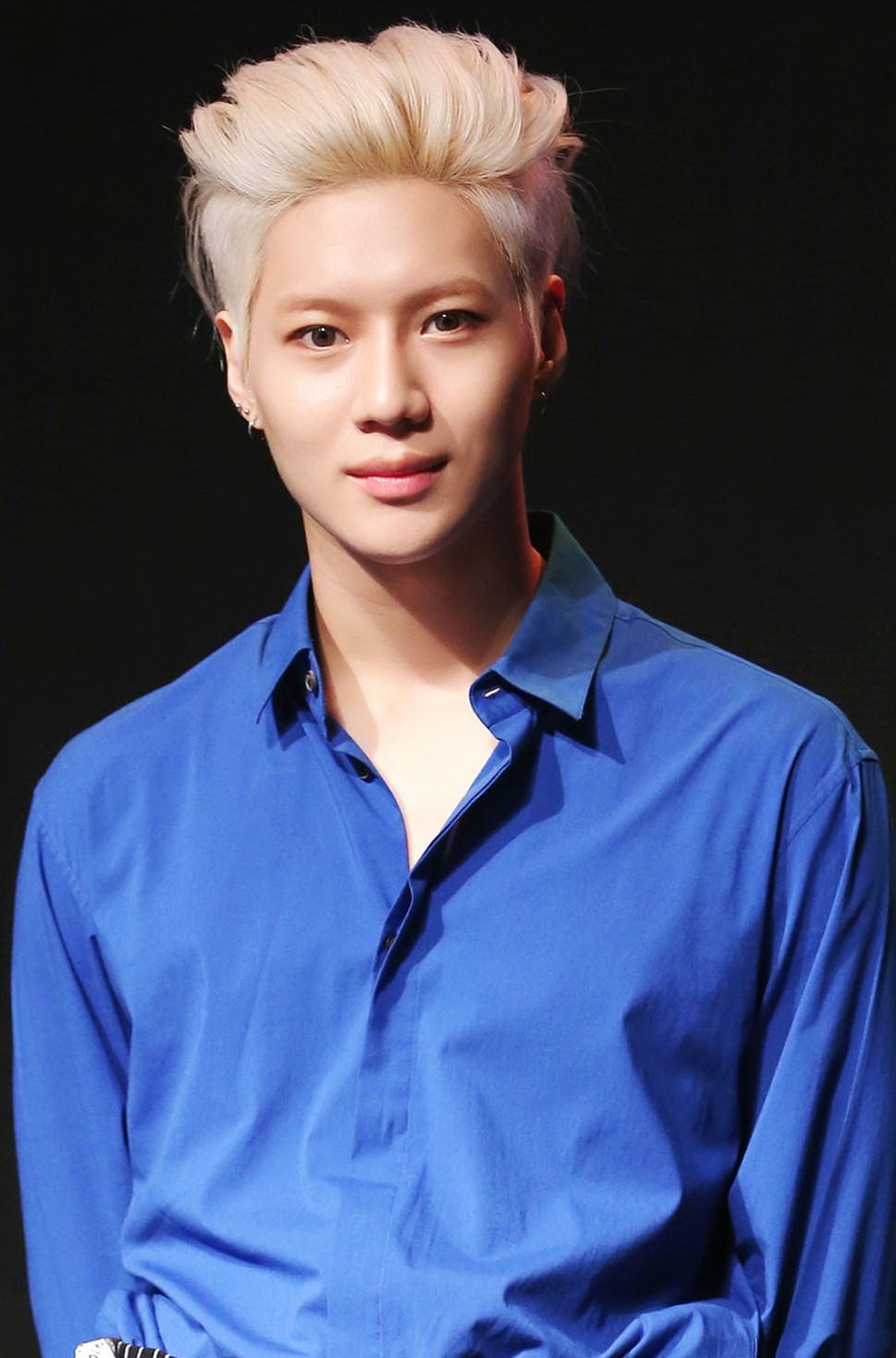
Taemin at the showcase for his first full album Press It in May 2016

Taemin released his first studio album Press It on February 23, 2016. The album contained ten songs, including the lead single "Press Your Number", which was co-produced by Bruno Mars. Taemin told reporters at a media showcase hosted by bandmate Minho at the SM Town Coex Artium in Gangnam District, Seoul, "After my EP, I did perform with Shinee but I also spent a lot of time preparing my next solo album, […] I took a lot of private lessons for voice and dance, and looked over my past songs. I want to say that I've become a stronger performer." The album debuted at number one on the Gaon Album Chart.

In June 2016, Taemin's Japanese debut was announced with the EP Sayonara Hitori and a showcase on his 23rd birthday. The EP was released on July 27 and included four new songs, as well as the Japanese version of "Press Your Number". Later in June, Taemin was confirmed to be part of the cast of Mnet's dance program Hit the Stage. He was partnered with Koharu Sugawara, who choreographed his Japanese debut song "Sayonara Hitori", and placed first in the second episode.

=== 2017–2018: Flame of Love, Move and Taemin ===
In July 2017, Taemin held his first solo concert in Japan at the Nippon Budokan in Tokyo, attracting 28,000 fans. His second Japanese EP, Flame of Love, was released the same month. Taemin held his first Korean concert, Off-Sick, over three days at the end of August, playing to a total of 12,000 people. Encore Off-Sick concerts were announced on September 7 and took place on October 14 and 15 at Jamsil Gymnasium, attracting 10,000 fans. This was later followed by additional shows in Japan.

In August 2017, Taemin's first Japanese drama, Final Life: Even If You Disappear Tomorrow, was announced. The crime series, directed by Masatoshi Kurakata and Takeshi Maruyama, was an original Japanese work for Amazon Prime Video and released in September. It starred Taemin and Shota Matsuda. Taemin also provided vocals for the soundtrack for the drama, "What's This Feeling". His first reality series, The Taemin: Xtra Cam, was broadcast through V Live, showing preparations for his upcoming album and behind-the-scenes concert footage.

Taemin joined the reality show The Unit as a mentor in October 2017. His second studio album, Move, was released the same month. Its lead single of the same name gained attention for its unique choreography and sparked a trend called "Move Disease" after a performance of the song went viral in South Korea. The album debuted at number two on the Gaon Album Chart and number three on the Billboard World Albums Chart. On December 10, a repackaged edition of Move was released, titled Move-ing. It added four new songs to the tracklist, including the lead single "Day and Night". That same month, Taemin was scheduled to perform at the annual KBS Song Festival but pulled out a week after the death of bandmate Jonghyun.

Taemin took part in the JTBC program Why Not? The Dancer in May 2018. The show saw him travel to Los Angeles alongside Eunhyuk and Highlight member Lee Gi-kwang in their quest to become choreographers. He later joined the music program The Call, where he collaborated with artists such as Bewhy and UV. Beginning on September 21, 2018, Taemin embarked on his first Japanese concert tour, Sirius. It consisted of 32 sold-out shows across 16 cities, attracting 100,000 people. On November 5, Taemin released the self-titled studio album Taemin, his third overall and first in Japanese.

=== 2019: Want, Famous and debut with SuperM ===
Taemin released his second Korean EP, Want, on February 11, 2019. The choreography for the title track was created by Koharu Sugawara. The EP entered various Billboard charts, including number four on World Albums, Taemin's fifth entry to date, and number five on Heatseekers Albums, a new career high. He followed the release with his second Korean concert T1001101, which played at the SK Olympic Handball Gymnasium from March 15 to 17.

Taemin began his first Japan arena tour, XTM, in Hokkaido on June 8. Fourteen shows were scheduled, with three more added in August to accommodate demand. On August 4, Taemin digitally released his third Japanese EP Famous, with a physical release on August 28 through EMI Records and Universal Music Japan. The lead single and title track "Famous" was released on July 26, 2019, along with a music video. The EP topped the Oricon Albums Chart, his first release to do so.

In August, Taemin debuted as a member of SuperM, a K-pop supergroup created by SM Entertainment in collaboration with Capitol Records. The group's promotions began in October and were aimed at the American market. SuperM's self-titled debut EP was released on October 4, with lead single "Jopping". Taemin returned to Japan with his T1001101 concerts in December, performing at Yokohama Arena and Osaka-jō Hall over three days.

=== 2020–2025: Never Gonna Dance Again, Advice, Guilty and Eternal ===
Taemin was scheduled to hold a concert, Never Gonna Dance Again, in Seoul in March 2020, but it was cancelled due to the COVID-19 pandemic. Ahead of the release of his upcoming album, he starred in the online reality show Rare-Taem, in which he completed missions based on the results of a board game. Taemin's third Korean studio album, Never Gonna Dance Again, was released in two parts in September and November 2020, respectively. The project, together with lead singles "Criminal" and "Idea", was widely recognized by critics as one of the best K-pop releases of the year.

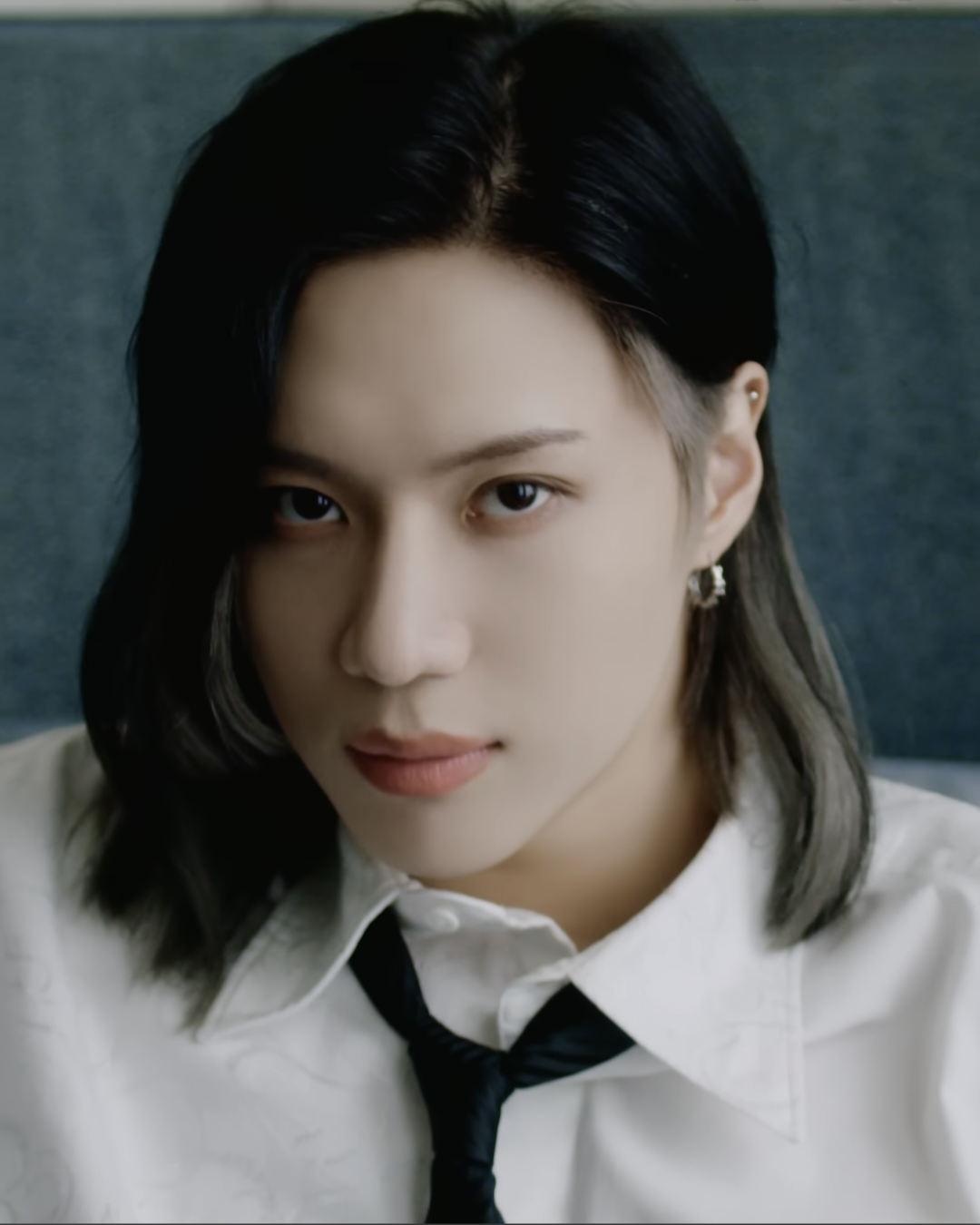
Taemin for Marie Claire Korea in 2021

Taemin released the song "My Day" for the soundtrack of tvN drama series Navillera in March 2021. He released his third Korean EP, Advice, on May 18. The album featured five songs, including the lead single of the same name. He previewed the single at an online concert called N.G.D.A. (Never Gonna Dance Again), which he held through the Beyond Live platform on May 2. The concert drew nearly 90,000 viewers across 119 countries. Taemin participated in the theme song for the 2020 Summer Olympics, which he recorded prior to his enlistment.

Taemin returned as a soloist with his fourth EP Guilty on October 30, 2023, two years and five months after Advice. In December, he held a concert titled Metamorph at the Inspire Arena in Incheon. He was the first artist to hold a standalone concert at the venue, which is the first multi-purpose arena in South Korea. Taemin's solo contract with SM Entertainment ended in March 2024, though he continued to conduct group activities with Shinee under the company. He signed a new contract with BPM Entertainment for his solo promotions. In July he performed at KCON 2024 at Crypto.com Arena Los Angeles. He released his fifth EP, Eternal, on August 19, commemorating the tenth anniversary of his solo debut. On August 31, he embarked on a world tour, titled Ephemeral Gaze, beginning with concerts in Asia and expanding to the U.S., Europe, and South America. He hosted the Mnet survival show Road to Kingdom: Ace of Ace in September 2024. His tour concluded in April 2025 with encore shows at the Olympic Gymnastics Arena in Seoul. In total, the tour included 29 cities across 20 countries.

On September 13, he embarked on a Japanese arena tour, titled Veil, and released a digital single of the same name. His arena tour ended in Hyogo on December 25 following 11 performances. He staged an additional concert in Las Vegas the following month.

=== 2026–present: Phase 1: Soft Violence ===
On February 24, 2026, it was announced that Taemin had terminated his contract with BPM Entertainment, amidst media reports surrounding the company's financial instability. It was alleged that BPM owed Taemin one billion won in financial settlement and that they had signed a contract with an external company without his consent. Sports Chosun reported that Taemin had personally supported his staff's salaries during this time. On March 11, it was announced that he signed an exclusive contract with Galaxy Corporation. He released his first English digital single shortly after, a pop R&B track titled "Long Way Home". In April, he became the first Korean male soloist to perform at Coachella. Taemin premiered six new songs at the festival: "Permission", "Parasite", "Frankenstein", "Let Me Be the One", "Sober" and "1004". He released "Permission" as a digital single the following month.

Taemin released a new EP, Phase 1: Soft Violence, with double lead singles "Float" and "Gooey" and previously released single "Permission", on August 31. He will embark on a world tour, titled Liminal, in support of the EP.

== Public image and musical style ==
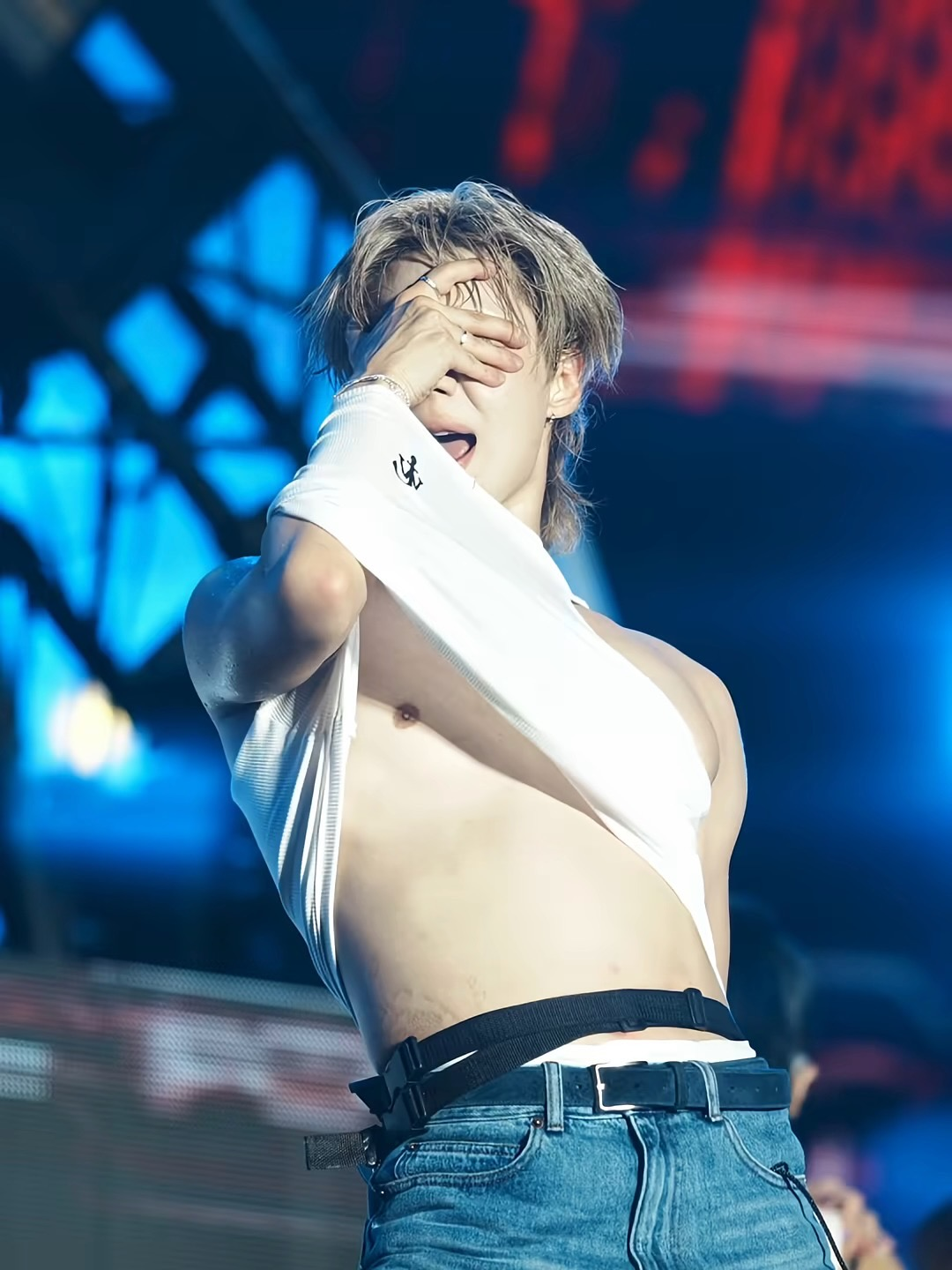
Taemin performing "Advice" at the 2025 Waterbomb festival in Singapore

Taemin is noted for his distinctive and intricate dancing style, which often incorporates elements of contemporary dance. His frequent use of androgynous fashion and make-up, especially since his 2017 single "Move", has earned him recognition as a pioneer of the genderless performance trend amongst male K-pop idols.

I wanted to go beyond what K-pop typically is perceived as, and through "Move" I was able to show a concept that's more edgy, more powerful. Not only that, but regardless of the gender, I believe that all of the audience will be able to enjoy and listen to this as something different from most of what's coming out in K-pop. (...) My aim was to find a middle ground, mixing both masculine and feminine movements into the choreography together. — Taemin on "Move"

The choreography to "Move", created by Japanese choreographer and frequent collaborator Koharu Sugawara, went viral in South Korea following the single's release, spurring many dance covers by fans and celebrities in a trend dubbed "Move Disease".

Taemin's discography is predominantly pop and R&B and occasionally influenced by rock, hip-hop, trap and electro, darker in theme than his work with Shinee, and sensual in character. Lyrically, Taemin's songs cover concepts ranging from love and lust to self-discovery, philosophy and faith. His music videos are often choreography-focused and contain biblical references, particularly "Want".

== Philanthropy ==
In 2016, Taemin along with groupmate Key and other artists from SM Entertainment, participated in the "Make a Promise" campaign by UNICEF and Louis Vuitton, whereby 40% of the proceeds were donated through UNICEF to children in need.

== Personal life ==
=== Education and religion ===
In March 2011, Taemin transferred from Chungdam High School to Hanlim Multi Art School to accommodate his busy schedule during Shinee's Japanese promotions. He graduated in February 2012, but was unable to attend the ceremony due to the band's activities. Taemin enrolled in Myongji University in 2013, majoring in Film and Musicals. He identifies as Catholic.

=== Military service ===
On April 19, 2021, he announced during a broadcast on V Live that he would be enlisting for his mandatory military service on May 31, serving as a member of the military band. On January 14, 2022, it was announced that Taemin would complete his military service as a public service worker due to worsening symptoms of depression and panic disorder. He was discharged on April 4, 2023.

== Discography ==
Studio albums

- Press It (2016)
- Move (2017)
- Taemin (2018)
- Never Gonna Dance Again (2020)

=== Songwriting credits ===
All songwriting credits are adapted from the Korean Music Copyright Association.

List of songs, showing year released, artist name, and name of the album
Title	Year	Artist	Album	Lyricist	Composer
"Press Your Number"	2016	Himself	Press It	Yes	No
"Soldier"	2016	Himself	Press It	Yes	No
"Day and Night" (낮과 밤)	2017	Himself	Move-ing	Yes	Yes
"Pinocchio"	2018	Himself, Bewhy	The Call Project No. 4	Yes	No
"Our Page" (네가 남겨둔 말)	2018	Shinee	The Story of Light EP.3	Yes	No
"Sunny Side"	2018	Shinee	Non-album single	Yes	No
"2 Kids"	2020	Himself	Never Gonna Dance Again: Act 1	Yes	No
"Heaven"	2020	Himself	Never Gonna Dance Again: Act 2	Yes	No
"Think of You" (안아줄래)	2020	Himself	Never Gonna Dance Again: Act 2	Yes	No
"Pansy"	2020	Himself	Never Gonna Dance Again: Act 2	Yes	No
"Sexy in the Air"	2024	Himself	Eternal	No	Yes
"Crush"	2024	Himself	Eternal	No	Yes
"The Unknown Sea"	2024	Himself	Eternal	No	Yes
"Deja Vu"	2024	Himself	Eternal	Yes	Yes
"Say Less"	2024	Himself	Eternal	Yes	Yes
"Permission"	2026	Himself	Phase 1: Soft Violence	Yes	Yes
"Easy Loving You"	2026	Himself	Phase 1: Soft Violence	Yes	No
"Sober"	2026	Himself	Phase 1: Soft Violence	No	Yes
"Parasite"	2026	Himself	Phase 1: Soft Violence	No	Yes
"This Is The End"	2026	Himself	Phase 1: Soft Violence	No	Yes
"Let Me Be The One"	2026	Himself	Phase 1: Soft Violence	Yes	No
"Frankenstein"	2026	Himself	Phase 1: Soft Violence	No	Yes
"Gooey"	2026	Himself	Phase 1: Soft Violence	Yes	No
"1004"	2026	Himself	Phase 1: Soft Violence	Yes	Yes

== Filmography ==
=== Film ===
Year	Title	Role	Notes	Ref.
2012	Koala Kid	Johnny	Voice role; Korean version	
2012	I Am	Himself	SM Town documentary	
2015	SM Town the Stage	Himself	SM Town concert film	

=== Television ===
Year	Title	Role	Notes	Ref.
2009	Hilarious Housewives	Jun-su		
2011	Athena: Goddess of War	Himself	Cameo	
2011	Moon Night '90	Kim Sung-jae	Deux episode	
2011	High Kick! 3	Himself		
2012	Salamander Guru and The Shadows	Master of Disguise		
2013	Dating Agency: Cyrano	Yang Ho-yeol/Ray		
2013	The Miracle	Kim Tan	The Heirs parody	
2017	Final Life: Even If You Disappear Tomorrow	Song Sion		

=== Variety shows ===
Year	Title	Notes	Ref.
2012	Immortal Songs 2	Contestant	
2013–2014	We Got Married	with Son Na-eun	
2015	Match Made in Heaven Returns	Cast member	
2015	Off to School	Cast member	
2016	Hit the Stage	Contestant	
2017	The Unit	Mentor	
2018	Why Not? The Dancer	Cast member	
2018	The Call	Cast member	
2024	Road to Kingdom: Ace of Ace	Host	

=== Web ===
Year	Title	Ref.
2017	The Taemin: Xtra Cam	
2020–2021	Taem-log 6v6	
2020	Rare-Taem	

== Musical theatre ==
Year	Title	Role	Ref.
2014	Goong	Prince Lee Shin	

== Concerts and tours ==
=== Headlining ===
- Taemin the 1st Stage Nippon Budokan (2017)
- Off-Sick (2017)
- Taemin Japan 1st Tour "Sirius" (2018)
- T1001101 (2019)
- XTM Arena Tour (2019)
- Taemin: N.G.D.A. (Never Gonna Dance Again) (2021)
- Metamorph (2023–24)
- Ephemeral Gaze (2024–25)
- Veil (2025)
- Liminal (2026–27)
