= Press It =

- Korean digital and Version A cover

Studio album by Taemin
- Released: February 23, 2016
- Recorded: 2015–2016
- Studios: InGrid (Seoul); SM Blue Cup (Seoul); Sound Pool (Seoul); SM Yellow Tail (Seoul)
- Genres: K-pop; dance
- Length: 37:25
- Language: Korean
- Labels: SM; KT Music

Taemin chronology
Ace (2014)	Press It (2016)	Sayonara Hitori (2016)

Singles from Press It
- 1. "Drip Drop" Released: February 22, 2016; 2. "Press Your Number" Released: February 23, 2016

Press It is the debut studio album by South Korean singer Taemin. It was released on February 23, 2016, by SM Entertainment. The title song for the album is "Press Your Number".

== Background and release ==
On February 15, 2016, SM Entertainment announced Taemin would release his first full album entitled Press It on February 23. On February 22, a performance video for "Drip Drop" was uploaded to YouTube. The official music video for the album's single, "Press Your Number", came out the next day on February 23. Prior to the album and "Press Your Number" music video release, Taemin performed two showcases for the press and fans on February 22. The fan showcase was streamed live through Naver's V app.

== Composition ==
Press It was produced over the course of a year and a half. The title track, "Press Your Number", was originally written by Bruno Mars, with composition by The Stereotypes. The demo was originally made years prior and was purchased by SM Entertainment. Taemin said that he did not meet with Mars to work on the song. Taemin did, however, pen new lyrics for the song in order to appeal to the Korean market. In addition, another song given to him for this album was "Already", written and composed by his bandmate Jonghyun. While on Jonghyun's Blue Night radio show, Taemin talked about how he took special care in selecting every song on the album himself, even though he didn't write them all. "Soldier" was the first song he had written for an album and it was conceived during his travels abroad. The final song on the album, "Hypnosis", was originally supposed to be included on Taemin's debut EP Ace.

== Release and critical reception ==
Press It reached number one on Gaon Album Chart. On the US Billboard charts, Press It debuted at number two on the World Albums chart and number seven on the Heatseekers chart. On March 1, Taemin received his first music show award for "Press Your Number" on SBS's The Show and during the same week won awards for Show Champion, M! Countdown, and Music Bank.

== Track listing ==
Press It track listing
No.	Title	Lyrics	Music	Arrangement	Length
1.	"Drip Drop"	Park Seong-hee	Jamil "Digi" Chammas; Jonathan Perkins; Michael Jiminez; Sara Forsberg; Jeremy "Tay" Jasper; Leven Kali; MZMC	Orange Factory Music	3:25
2.	"Press Your Number"	Tenzo & Tasco (Duble Kick); Taemin	Jonathan Yip; Ray Romulus; Jeremy Reeves; Ray Charles McCullough II; Bruno Mars; Philip Lawrence	The Stereotypes; Mars; Lawrence	3:46
3.	"Soldier"	Taemin	Matthew Tishler; Felicia Barton; Aaron Benward	Tishler; Barton; Benward	3:34
4.	"Already" (Korean: 벌써; RR: Beolsseo)	Jonghyun	Teddy Riley (Red Rocket); Lee Hyun-seung (Red Rocket); Dominique "DOM" Rodriguez (Red Rocket); Daniel Obi Klein; Jonghyun	Red Rocket; Adam	3:42
5.	"Guess Who"	Brian Kim (ZigZag Note)	Greg Bonnick; Hayden Chapman; Andrew Choi; Jasper; David Choi; Shaun	LDN Noise; Andrew Choi; David Choi; Jasper; Shaun	3:27
6.	"One by One"	Lee Seu-ran	iDR; Antwann Frost; Ryan S. Jhun	iDR; Frost; Jhun	3:58
7.	"Mystery Lover"	Jo Yoon-kyung	Adrian McKinnon; Mark Q. Rankin; Jhun	McKinnon; Rankin; Jhun	3:38
8.	"Sexuality (Rearranged Version)"	Kenzie	Jodi Marr; Eric Bazilian; Jhun	Marr; Bazilian; Jhun	3:40
9.	"Until Today" (Korean: 오늘까지만; RR: Oneulkkajiman)	G.Soul	Chammas; Justin Lucas; Deez; G.Soul; MZMC	Chammas; Lucas; Deez	4:06
10.	"Hypnosis" (Korean: 최면; RR: Choemyeon)	Lee Ji-eun (Music Cube); Tesung Kim (Iconic Sounds)	Kim Yong-sin (Iconic Sounds); Tesung Kim; Joseph "220" Park (Iconic Sounds)	Iconic Sounds	4:04
Total length:					37:45

== Charts ==
=== Weekly charts ===
Weekly chart performance for Press It
Chart (2016)	Peak position
Japanese Albums (Oricon)	15
Japanese Hot Albums (Billboard Japan)	16
South Korean Albums (Gaon)	1
US Heatseekers Albums (Billboard)	7
US World Albums (Billboard)	2

=== Monthly charts ===
Monthly chart performance for Press It
Chart (2016)	Peak position
South Korean Albums (Gaon)	2

=== Year-end charts ===
Year-end chart performance for Press It
Chart (2016)	Position
South Korean Albums (Gaon)	18

== Accolades ==
Music program awards
Song	Program	Date	Ref.
"Press Your Number"	The Show	March 1, 2016	
"Press Your Number"	Show Champion	March 2, 2016	
"Press Your Number"	M! Countdown	March 3, 2016	
"Press Your Number"	Music Bank	March 4, 2016	

== Release history ==
Release history and formats for Press It
Region	Date	Format	Label	Ref.
South Korea	February 23, 2016	CD; digital download; streaming	SM Entertainment; KT Music	
Various	February 23, 2016	Digital download	SM Entertainment	
