= Move (Taemin song) =

2017 single by Taemin

Single by Taemin

from the album Move
- Language: Korean
- Released: October 16, 2017
- Studio: Doobdoob (Seoul); SM Blue Ocean (Seoul)
- Genre: Pop; R&B
- Length: 3:32
- Label: SM
- Composers: Curtis A. Richardson; Adien Lewis; Angélique Cinélu
- Lyricist: Seo Ji-eum

Taemin singles chronology
"Flame of Love" (2017)	"Move" (2017)	"Thirsty" (2017)

Music video
- "Move" on YouTube

"Move" is a song recorded by South Korean singer Taemin for his 2017 album of the same name. The song was composed and arranged by Curtis A. Richardson, Adien Lewis and Angélique Cinélu, with lyrics written by Seo Ji-eum. It was released on October 16, 2017, through SM Entertainment as the album's lead single. "Move" is a sultry, bass-driven pop R&B song that has been praised by critics for its blurring of gender boundaries. It has been credited with popularising genderless performance styles amongst male K-pop idols.

The song is noted for its distinctive choreography, which went viral following a live performance at Seoul Fashion Week, inspiring covers from fans and celebrities alike. This is often referred to as "Move disease". In recognition of his performance, Taemin won the award for Best Dance Performance Solo at the 2017 Mnet Asian Music Awards.

== Background and release ==
On September 28, 2017, SM Entertainment announced the upcoming release of Taemin's second Korean-language studio album, Move, led by the single of the same name. It had been a year and a half since his last release, Press It. Taemin first showcased the song at his concert, Off-Sick, on October 15, 2017, before releasing it alongside the album the next day. "Move" was not originally intended as the lead single, but Taemin chose it over album track "Love", feeling that the latter would not allow him to show his identity. "I could have chosen a safer route and done music that’s more popular in K-pop, but I wanted to expand its musical spectrum, to stand out from the rest, and create something that could bring out my identity more," Taemin reflected.

Taemin promoted the song with a performance at Seoul Fashion Week, in what W named as the standout moment of the season. An online video of this performance later went viral, prompting covers from a wide range of people. This became known as "Move disease". Taemin continued his promotions with performances at M Countdown, Music Bank and Inkigayo.

== Reception ==
"Move" received generally positive reviews from music critics. Tamar Herman of Billboard described it as "a groovy, bass-driven song that sees a seamless blending of sounds", adding that Taemin "grows into his own passionate pop-R&B style". Billboard later named the song one of the 100 greatest K-pop songs of the 2010s, praising its "unnerving seductiveness". Taylor Glasby of Dazed noted that Taemin's usual "sensual vocals and dramatic flair" were "scaled back", but nevertheless felt that "the icy beats, teasing builds and the arresting pull of Taemin’s physical prowess makes for a captivating release". It has drawn comparisons to the work of Michael Jackson and George Michael, as well as Depeche Mode and The Weeknd.

"Move" debuted and peaked at number 12 on Gaon Digital Chart. It stayed on the chart for a further four weeks. It also reached peaks of number four and number 26 on Billboard World Digital Song Sales and the K-pop Hot 100, respectively. As of November 2017, "Move" has sold 194,526 digital copies in South Korea.

"Move" on critic lists
Publication	List	Rank	Ref.
Billboard	The 100 Greatest K-Pop Songs of the 2010s	85	
Dazed	The 20 Best K-Pop Songs of 2017	8	
Melon	Top 100 K-Pop Masterpieces	36	
Rolling Stone	The 100 Greatest Songs in the History of Korean Pop Music	86	

=== Accolades ===
Awards and nominations for "Move"
Ceremony	Year	Category	Result	Ref.
Mnet Asian Music Awards	2017	Best Dance Performance – Solo	Won	
Mnet Asian Music Awards	2017	Song of the Year	Nominated	

== Music video ==
The music video for "Move" was directed by High Quality Fish. It premiered on YouTube on October 16, 2017, the same day as the song's release. Three music videos were released, showing the choreography from different angles. They include a solo performance, an ensemble performance, and a duo performance featuring Taemin's long-time collaborator Koharu Sugawara. The video was shot in the rain and depicts Taemin and his dancers performing on empty streets under dim lighting. It features CCTV footage, blurry VHS frames and camera angles "which film like a secret onlooker". It also includes masked scenes, partly inspired by Sia, as a means of repudiating the typically appearance-driven nature of the K-pop industry. According to Dazed, the "song and video complete, and exist for, each other as a twin performance".

The choreography, created by Sugawara, is purposely smooth, taking advantage of Taemin's androgynous appearance by "mixing both masculine and feminine movements" together. It is performed with an exclusively female team of dancers. The choreography shies away from dramatic movements and instead incorporates soft, balletic lines to add subtlety. Taemin explained: "I wanted to break the idea of what male performers are supposed to show, what performances girl groups are supposed to show. I really wanted to break those labels, showing that dance is a form of art." This effect is further enhanced by Taemin's "genderless" costuming. "Move" has since been credited with popularising genderless performance styles amongst male idols. Rolling Stone described it as "iconic for its alternative representation of sexuality".

== Credits and personnel ==
Credits adapted from the liner notes of Move.

Studios

- Recorded at SM Blue Ocean Studio and Doobdoob Studio
- Digitally edited at Doobdoob Studio
- Mixed at SM Blue Cup Studio
- Mastered at Sterling Sound

Personnel

- Taemin – vocals, background vocals
- Seo Ji-eum – lyrics
- Curtis A. Richardson – composition, arrangement
- Adien Lewis – composition, arrangement
- Angélique Cinélu – composition, arrangement
- Deez – vocal directing
- Andrew Choi – background vocals
- Kim Chul-soon – recording
- Jang Woo-young – recording, digital editing
- Jung Eui-seok – mixing
- Randy Merrill – mastering

== Charts ==
Chart performance for "Move"
Chart (2017)	Peak position
South Korea (Gaon)	12
South Korea (K-pop Hot 100)	26
US World Digital Song Sales (Billboard)	4

== Release history ==
Release history and formats for "Move"
Region	Date	Format	Label	Ref.
Various	October 16, 2017	Digital download; streaming	SM Entertainment	
