= Sayonara Hitori =

- Digital cover

EP by Taemin
- Released: July 27, 2016
- Studio: Avex (Azabu); Bunkamura (Shibuya); In Grid (Seoul); Sony (Tokyo)
- Genre: J-pop
- Language: Japanese
- Label: EMI; UMJ
- Producer: Nozomu Tsuchiya; Lee Soo-man (KR)

Taemin chronology
Press It (2016)	Sayonara Hitori (2016)	Flame of Love (2017)

Singles from Sayonara Hitori
- 1. "Press Your Number" Released: February 26, 2016; 2. "Sayonara Hitori" Released: July 5, 2016

Sayonara Hitori (さよならひとり, Solitary Goodbye) is the debut Japanese extended play (second overall) by South Korean singer Taemin under EMI Records, a division of Universal Music Japan. It was released digitally and physically on July 27, 2016.

== Background and release ==
On February 26, 2016, Taemin released his first single in Japanese, "Press Your Number", previously released on his first studio album, Press It. On June 23, 2016, Taemin's Japanese debut was announced with the mini album Sayonara Hitori, including a showcase on his 23rd birthday. On July 5, he released the music video for "Sayonara Hitori". The album was released on July 27, including four new songs and "Press Your Number" (Japanese Version).

According to Oricon, Sayonara Hitori sold 38,490 copies on the first day of release, and debuted at third place on the daily albums chart. On August 3, the Korean version of the album was released, titled Goodbye, containing the previous Japanese tracks and the Korean version of "Sayonara Hitori".

== Track listing ==
Sayonara Hitori CD track listing
No.	Title	Lyrics	Music	Arrangement	Length
1.	"Sayonara Hitori" (さよならひとり; Solitary Goodbye)	Sara Sakurai (T's Music)	Yoko Hiramatsu; Denniz Jamm; Martin René	Jamm; René	3:30
2.	"Press Your Number" (Japanese version)	Sakurai; Tenzo & Tasco (Duble Kick); Taemin	Jonathan Yip; Ray Romulus; Jeremy Reeves; Ray Charles McCullough II; Bruno Mars; Philip Lawrence	The Stereotypes; Bruno Mars; Lawrence	3:47
3.	"Tiger"	Junji Ishiwatari	Andreas Stone Johansson; Chris Meyer; Octobar (Kimono Co.)	Johansson	3:56
4.	"Final Dragon"	Sakurai	Johansson; Stephan Elfgren	Johansson	4:39
5.	"Sekaide Ichiban Aishitahito" (世界で一番愛した人; The Person I Loved Most in This World)	Ishiwatari	Hanif Sabzevari (Hitmanic); Peo Dahl; Funk Uchino	Uchino; Kevin Charge (TG Publishing)	4:13
Total length:					20:05

Sayonara Hitori DVD track listing
No.	Title	Length
1.	"Sayonara Hitori" (music video)	3:41
2.	"Press Your Number" (Korean version) (music video)	3:42
3.	"Inside of Sayonara Hitori"	17:38
Total length:		25:01

Goodbye track listing
No.	Title	Lyrics	Music	Arrangement	Length
1.	"Goodbye" (Sayonara Hitori) (Korean version)	Sakurai; Brian Kim (ZigZag Note); Bong Eun-young; Bang Hye-hyun	Hiramatsu; Jamm; René	Jamm; Martin René	3:30
2.	"Sayonara Hitori" (さよならひとり; Solitary Goodbye)	Sakurai	Hiramatsu; Jamm; René	Jamm; René	3:30
3.	"Press Your Number" (Japanese version)	Sakurai; Tenzo & Tasco; Taemin	Yip; Romulus; Reeves; McCullough; Mars; Lawrence	The Stereotypes; Mars; Lawrence	3:47
4.	"Tiger"	Ishiwatari	Johansson; Meyer; Octobar	Johansson	3:56
5.	"Final Dragon"	Sakurai	Johansson; Elfgren	Johansson	4:39
6.	"Sekaide Ichiban Aishitahito" (世界で一番愛した人; The Person I Loved Most in This World)	Ishiwatari	Sabzevari; Dahl; Uchino	Uchino; Charge	4:13
Total length:					23:35

== Charts ==
Chart (2016)	Peak position
Japan Oricon Daily album chart	3
Japan Oricon Weekly album chart	3
Japan Oricon Monthly album chart	12

== Sales ==
Chart	Amount
Oricon physical sales	45,509+
Billboard Japan	52,000+

== Release history ==
Country	Date	Format	Label
Japan	July 27, 2016	CD, digital download	EMI Records
South Korea	August 3, 2016	CD, digital download	SM Entertainment
