= List of songs recorded by Taemin =

South Korean singer Taemin has recorded songs for four studio albums, one reissue, and six extended plays (EP). He debuted in 2008 as a member of the boy band Shinee and later established a career as a solo artist in 2014.

== Songs ==
Key
| † | Indicates single release |

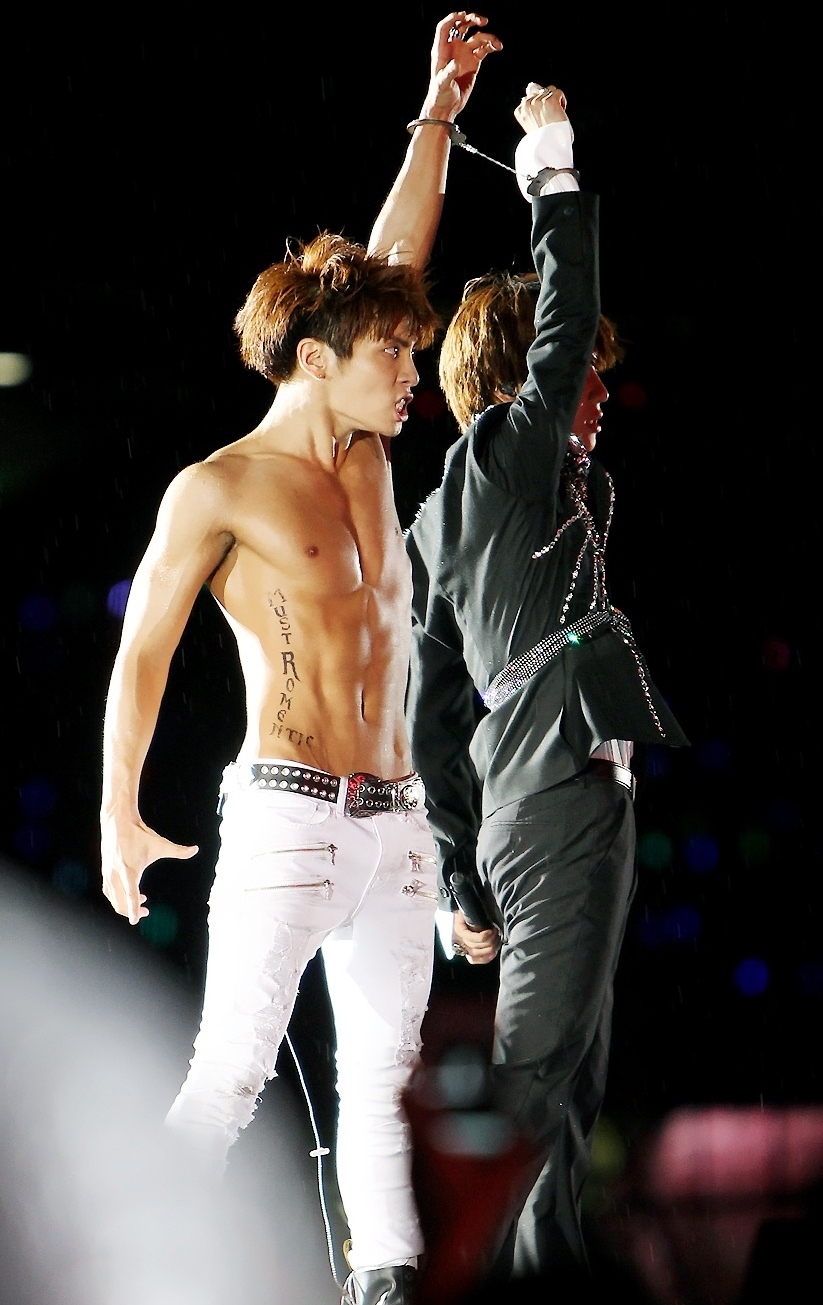
Jonghyun (left) wrote the songs "Pretty Boy" and "Already", and collaborated with Taemin (right) on "Named".

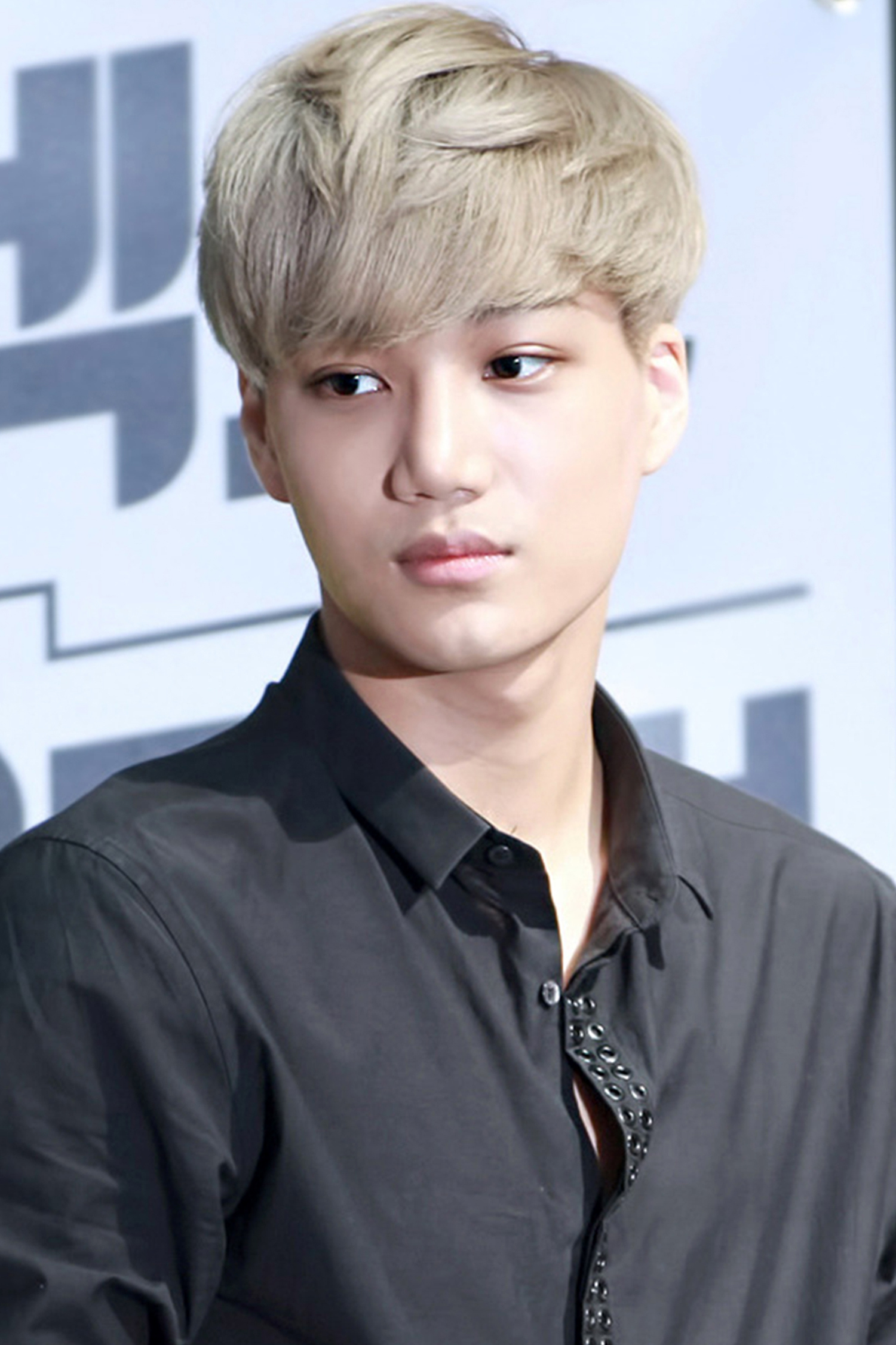
Kai appears as a featured artist on "Pretty Boy".

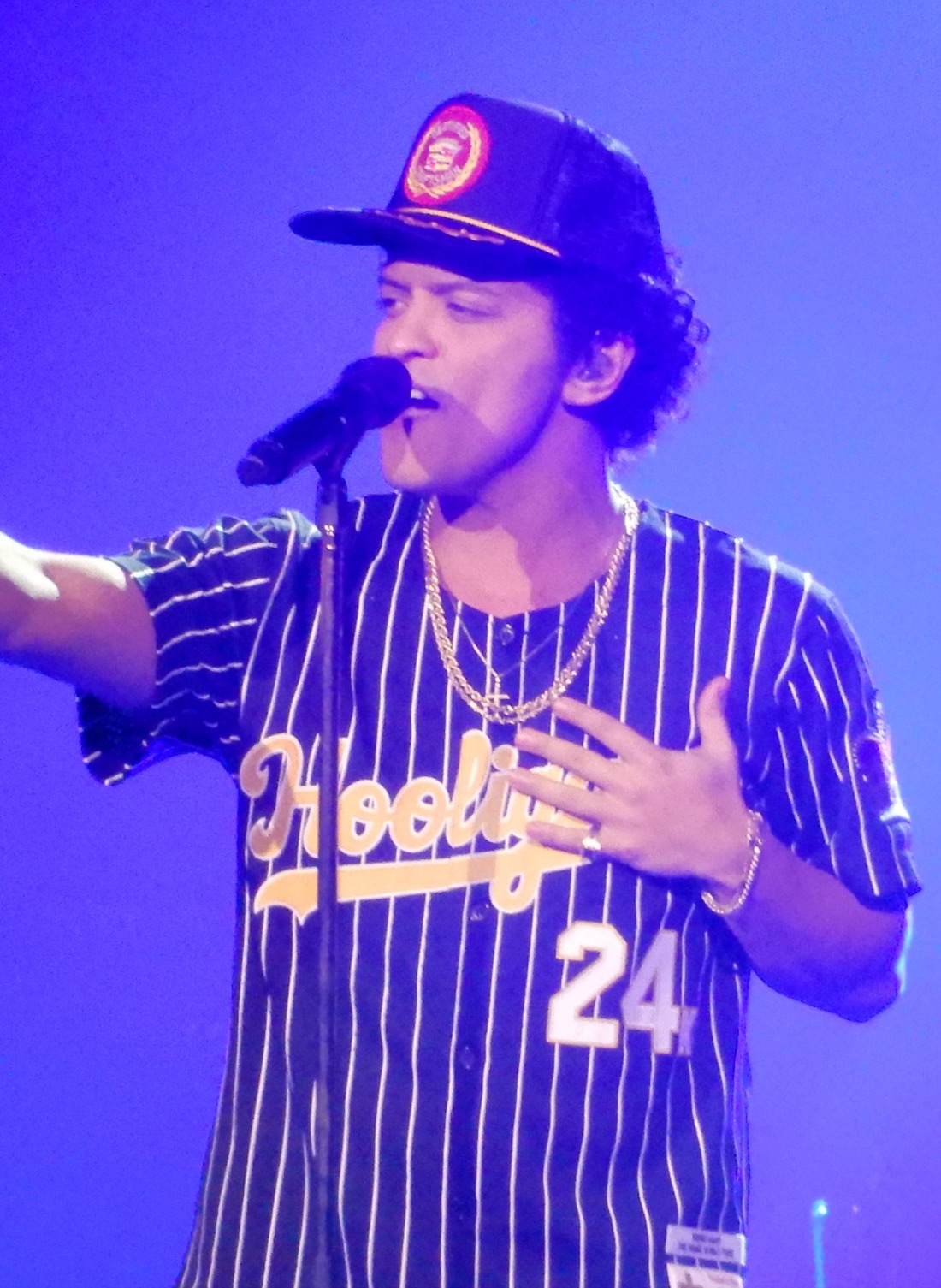
Bruno Mars co-wrote the single "Press Your Number" from Taemin's debut album Press It.

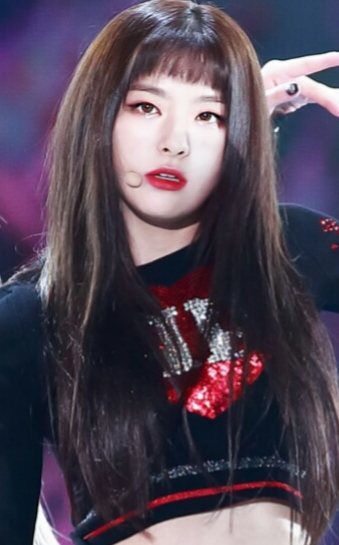
Seulgi appears as a featured artist on "Heart Stop".

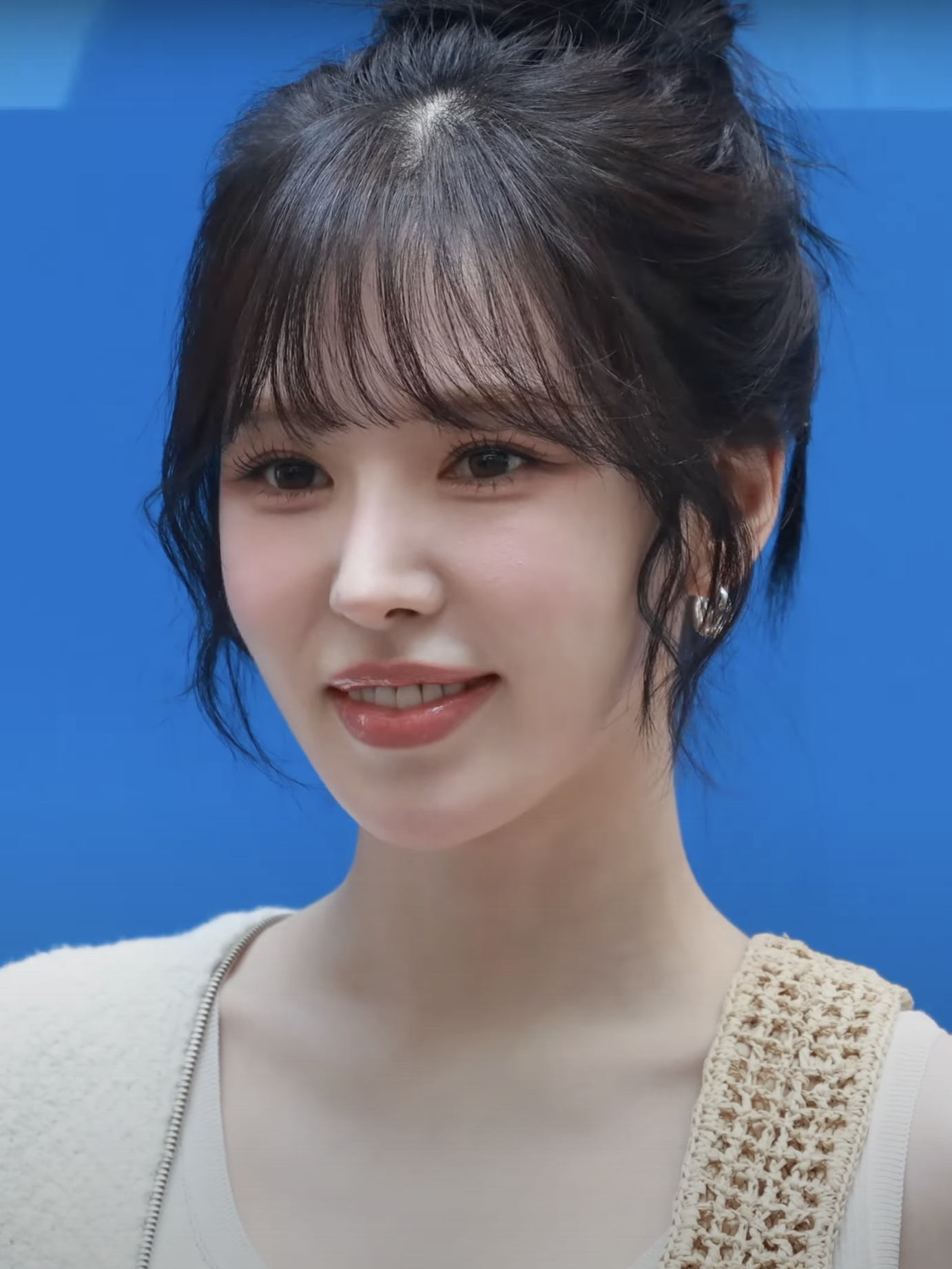
Wendy appears as a featured artist on "Be Your Enemy".

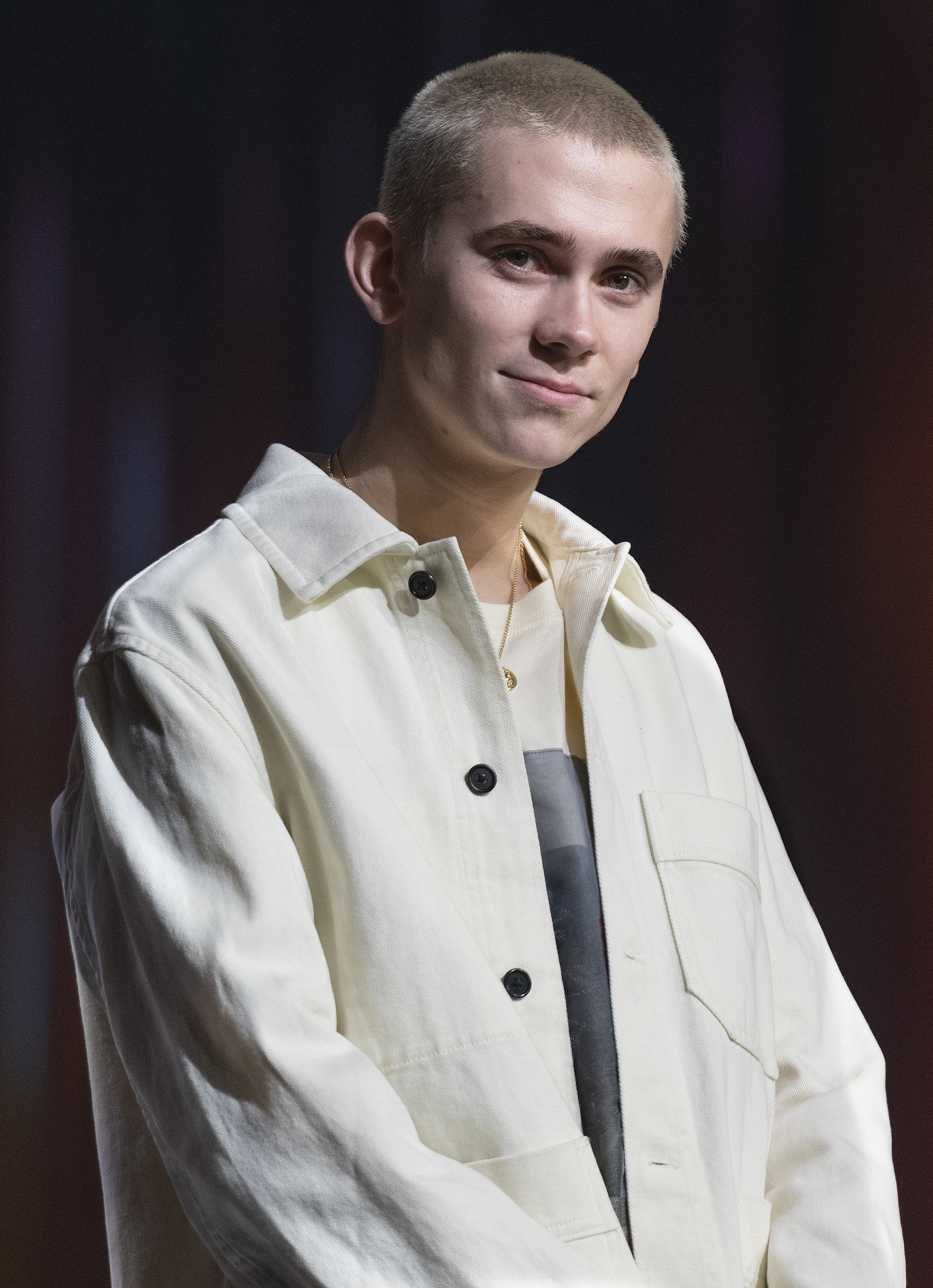
Swedish singer and actor Felix Sandman co-wrote the song "Pinocchio".

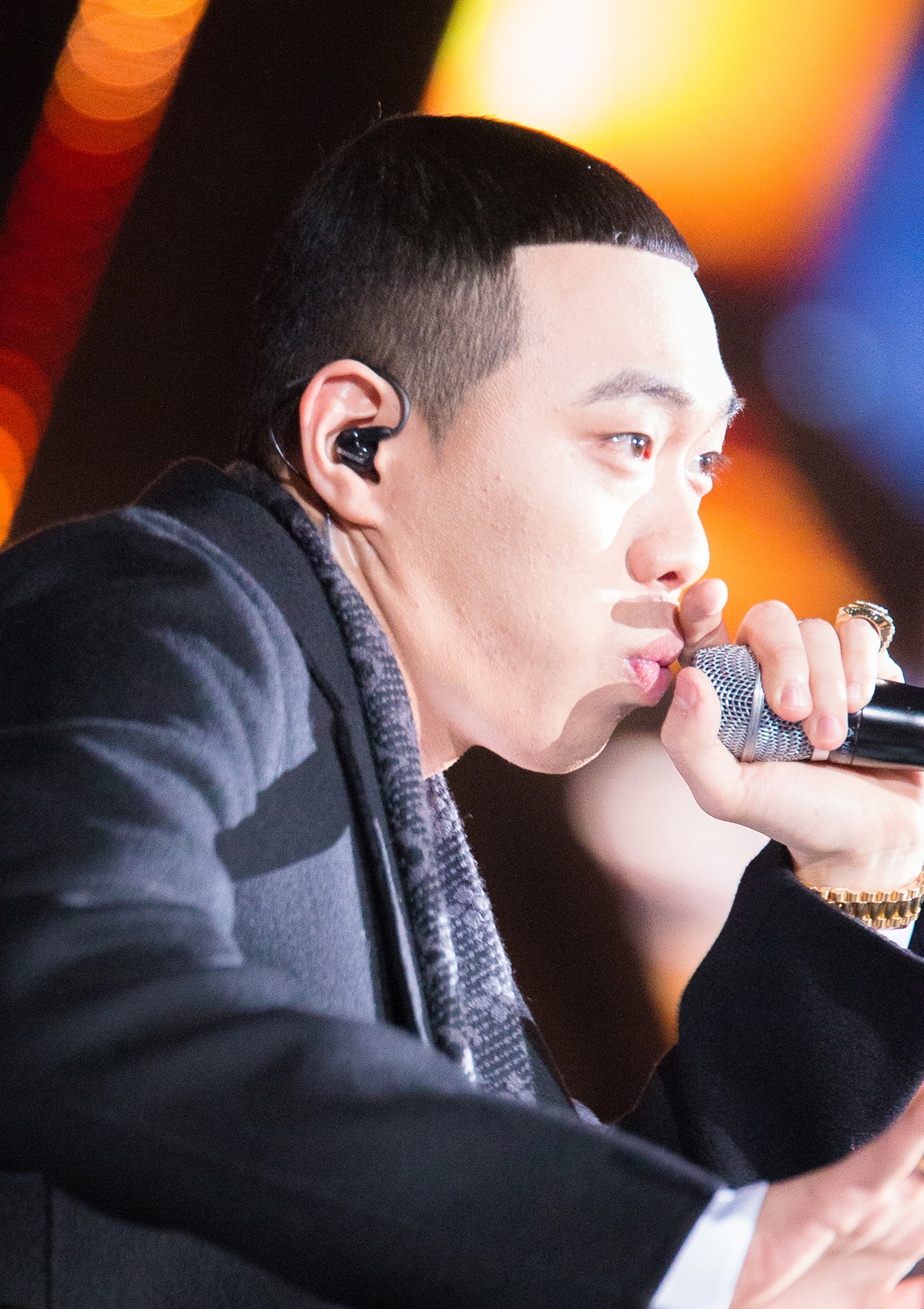
Rapper Bewhy co-wrote and recorded the song "Pinocchio".

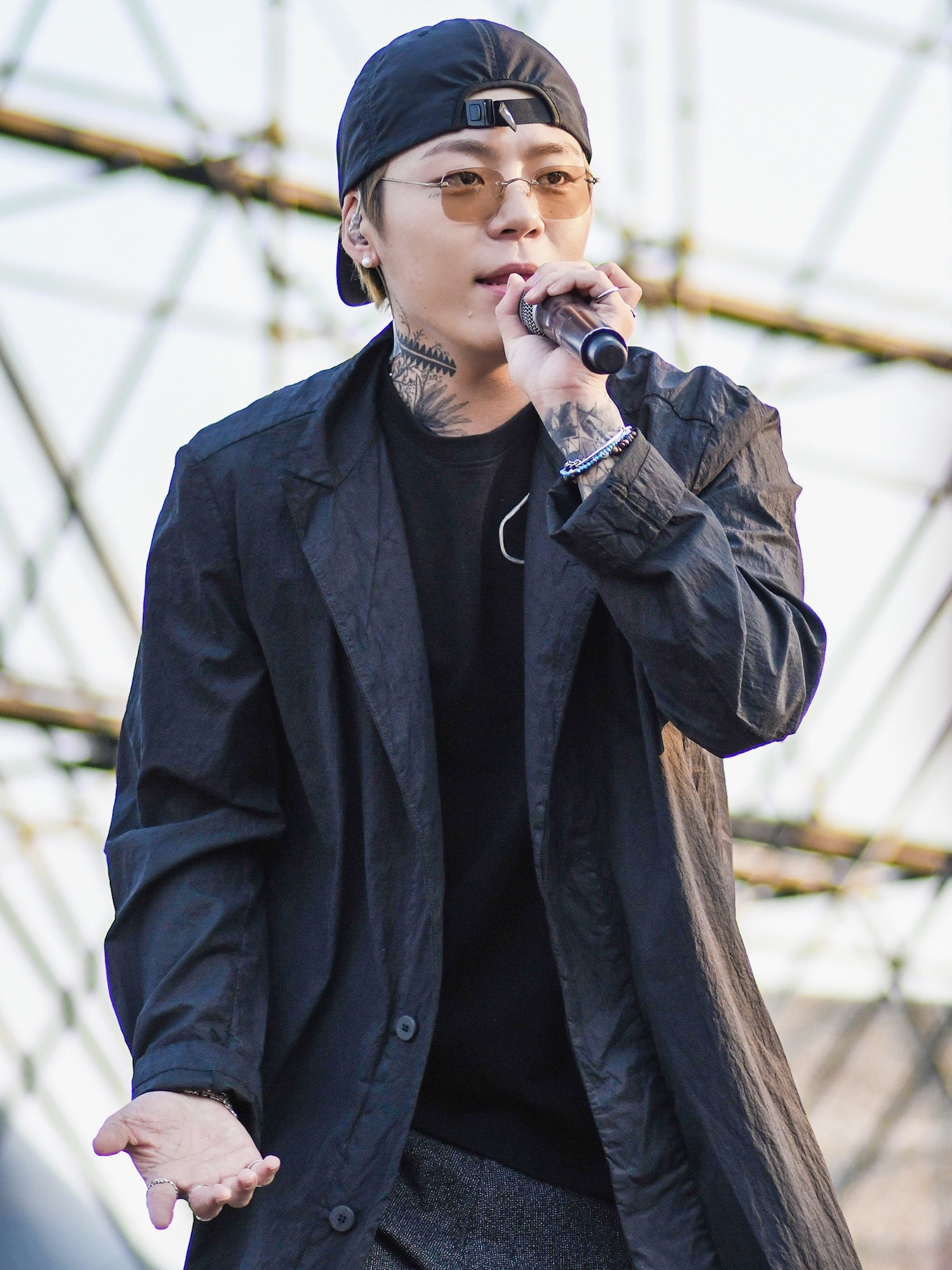
Rapper Kid Milli wrote and featured on the track "Black Rose".

Name of song, featured performers, writer(s), original release, and year of release
| Song | Artist(s) | Writer(s) | Album | Year | Ref. |
|---|---|---|---|---|---|
| "2 Kids" † | Taemin | Jo Yoon-kyung; Taemin; Matt Thomson; Max Lynedoch Graham; Ninos Hanna; Jenson Vaughan; Marlene Strand; James F. Reynolds; Tim Stuart | Never Gonna Dance Again: Act 1 | 2020 | |
| "Ace" | Taemin | Changmin; Daniel "Obi" Klein; Charli Taft; Deez; Ylva Dimberg | Ace | 2014 | |
| "Advice" † | Taemin | Jo Yoon-kyung; Mich Hansen; Daniel Davidsen; Peter Wallevik; Lucas Secon; Wayne Hector | Advice | 2021 | |
| "Already" (벌써) | Taemin | Jonghyun; Teddy Riley; Lee Hyun-seung; Dominique "DOM" Rodriguez; Daniel Obi Klein | Press It | 2016 | |
| "Artistic Groove" | Taemin | Jo Yoon-kyung; David Björk; Didrik Thott | Want | 2019 | |
| "Back to You" | Taemin | Seo Ji-eum; Mike Woods; Kevin White; Andrew Bazzi; MZMC | Move | 2017 | |
| "Be Your Enemy" | Taemin (featuring Wendy) | Park Tae-won; Hwang Yu-bin; Noah Conrad; Brooke Tomlinson; David Brook | Never Gonna Dance Again: Act 2 | 2020 | |
| "Because I Love You" (사랑하기 때문에) | Taemin | Yoo Jae-ha | 2015 Gayo Daejun Limited Edition | 2015 | |
| "Better Man" | Taemin | Junji Ishiwatari; Christoffer Lauridsen; Jimmy Claeson; Jon Asher | Taemin | 2018 | |
| "Black Rose" (일식) | Taemin (featuring Kid Milli) | Kim Soo-jin; Kid Milli; Greg Bonnick; Hayden Chapman; Deez; Adrian McKinnon | Never Gonna Dance Again: Act 1 | 2020 | |
| "Blue" | Taemin | Lee O-neul; Ji-he; Aaron Berton; Matt Crawford; Lucas Szulansky; Will Jay | Guilty | 2023 | |
| "Clockwork" | Taemin | Lee Seu-ran; Bong Eun-young; Britt Burton; Harvey Mason Jr. | Never Gonna Dance Again: Act 1 | 2020 | |
| "Colorful" † | Various artists | Ryosuke Imai; UTA; Sunny Boy; Jun | Non-album release | 2021 | |
| "Colours" | Taemin | Sara Sakurai; Warren David Meyers; Scott Russell Stoddart; Kyler Niko | Famous | 2019 | |
| "Crazy 4 U" | Taemin | Hwang Yoo-bin; Jin Suk Choi; Deez; Justin Philip Stein; Christopher "Che" Jamal Pope | Move | 2017 | |
| "Criminal" † | Taemin | Danke; Lauren Aquilina; Chloe Latimer; Shae Jacobs; Score; Megatone | Never Gonna Dance Again: Act 1 | 2020 | |
| "Crush" | Taemin | Soorin; Znee; Eeeee; Ryan S. Jhun; Taemin; James Daniel Lewis; Daniel Shah; Robbie Jay; Steven Manovski | Eternal | 2024 | |
| "Danger" (괴도) † | Taemin | Seo Ji-eum; Thomas Troelsen; Mikkel Remee Sigvardt | Ace | 2014 | |
| "Danger" (Japanese version) | Taemin | Seo Ji-eum; Sara Sakurai; Thomas Troelsen; Mikkel Remee Sigvardt | Taemin | 2018 | |
| "Day and Night" (낮과 밤) † | Taemin | Taemin; Hwang Hyun | Move-ing | 2017 | |
| "Deja Vu" | Taemin | Taemin; Ahn Young-joo; Young; Ryan S. Jhun; Sean Fischer; Enrique Maza; Sorana Pacurar; Young Chance | Eternal | 2024 | |
| "Do It Baby" | Taemin | Sara Sakurai; Sebastian Thott; Ninos Hanna | Flame of Love | 2017 | |
| "Door" | Taemin | Sara Sakurai; Andreas Stone Johansson; Andreas Öberg; Fredrik Hult; Steven Lee | Flame of Love | 2017 | |
| "Draw" (그림) | Taemin | AVGS; Jymon | No Office Romance! OST | 2023 | |
| "Drip Drop" † | Taemin | Park Seong-hee; Jamil "Digi" Chammas; Jonathan Perkins; Michael Jiminez; Sara Forsberg; Tay Jasper; Leven Kali; MZMC | Press It | 2016 | |
| "Drip Drop" (Japanese version) | Taemin | Park Seong-hee; Hidenori Tanaka; Jamil "Digi" Chammas; Jonathan Perkins; Michael Jiminez; Sara Forsberg; Tay Jasper; Leven Kali; MZMC | Taemin | 2018 | |
| "Eclipse" † | Taemin | Sara Sakurai; Andreas Stone Johansson; Barbi Escobar; Costa Leon; Kenzie | Taemin | 2018 | |
| "Exclusive" | Taemin | STY; Fredrik Thomander; Dennis Mansfeld; Dani Paz | Famous | 2019 | |
| "Exclusive" (Korean version) | Taemin | Mola; JQ; Fredrik Thomander; Dennis Mansfeld; Dani Paz | Never Gonna Dance Again: Act 2 | 2020 | |
| "Experience" | Taemin | Hong Ji-yoo; Winston Sela; Marcus Brosch | Ace | 2014 | |
| "Famous" † | Taemin | Kami Kaoru; Didrik Thott; Daniel Kim | Famous | 2019 | |
| "Famous" (Korean version) | Taemin | Lee Seu-ran; Didrik Thott; Daniel Kim | Never Gonna Dance Again: Act 1 | 2020 | |
| "Final Dragon" | Taemin | Sara Sakurai; Andreas Stone Johansson; Stephan Elfgren | Sayonara Hitori | 2016 | |
| "Flame of Love" † | Taemin | Amon Hayashi; Kanata Okajima; Andreas Öberg; Yuka Otsuki | Flame of Love | 2017 | |
| "Flame of Love" (Korean version) | Taemin | Jo Yoon-kyung; Amon Hayashi; Kanata Okajima; Andreas Öberg; Yuka Otsuki | Move | 2017 | |
| "G.O.A.T" | Taemin | San Yoon; Taemin; Colde; Basecamp; Yukon (Owave) | Eternal | 2024 | |
| "Goodbye" | Taemin | Sara Sakurai; Brian Kim; Bong Eun-young; Bang Hye-hyun; Yoko Hiramatsu; Denniz Jamm; Martin René | Goodbye | 2016 | |
| "Guess Who" | Taemin | Brian Kim; Greg Bonnick; Hayden Chapman; Andrew Choi; Tay Jasper; David Choi; Shaun | Press It | 2016 | |
| "Guilty" † | Taemin | Park Tae-won; Jonatan Gusmark; Ludvig Evers; Kole; Maxx Song; Kriz | Guilty | 2023 | |
| "Heart Stop" | Taemin (featuring Seulgi) | JQ; Kim Jin; Mola; Jamil "Digi" Chammas; Leven Kali; Ylva Dimberg; MZMC | Move | 2017 | |
| "Heaven" | Taemin | Taemin; Yoo Young-jin; Klara Ósk Elíasdóttir; Markus Videsäter; Emanuel "Email" Abrahamsson | Never Gonna Dance Again: Act 2 | 2020 | |
| "Holy Water" | Taemin | Sara Sakurai; Didrik Thott; Andreas Öhrn; Chris Wahle | Taemin | 2018 | |
| "Horizon" † | Taemin | Eunhwa (153/Joombas); BBYO; Jungeunki (Lalala Studio); Laurent Marc Louis; R.L. King; Joa; Taemin; Jacob Aaron (The Hub); Noerio (The Hub) | Eternal | 2024 | |
| "Hypnosis" (최면) | Taemin | Lee Ji-eun; Tesung Kim; Kim Yong-sin; Tesung Kim; Joseph "220" Park | Press It | 2016 | |
| "Hypnosis" (최면) (Rearranged version) | Taemin | Lee Ji-eun; Tesung Kim; Kim Yong-sin; Tesung Kim; Joseph "220" Park | Move-ing | 2017 | |
| "I Think it's Love" (사랑인 것 같아) | Taemin | MinGtion; Andrew Choi; Kim Yeon-seo | Never Gonna Dance Again: Act 2 | 2020 | |
| "I'm Crying" | Taemin | Meg.Me; Kevin Charge; Yumiko Okada; Grace Tone; Hide Nakamura | Flame of Love | 2017 | |
| "I'm Crying" (Korean version) | Taemin | Jo Yoon-kyung; Meg.Me; Kevin Charge; Yumiko Okada; Grace Tone; Hide Nakamura | Move-ing | 2017 | |
| "Idea" (이데아; 理想) † | Taemin | Moon Seol-ri; James Foye III; Austin Owens; Jimmy Claeson; Adrian McKinnon; Tay Jasper | Never Gonna Dance Again: Act 2 | 2020 | |
| "Identity" | Taemin | Jo Yoon-kyung; Steven Lee | Never Gonna Dance Again: Act 2 | 2020 | |
| "If I Could Tell You" | Taemin (featuring Taeyeon) | Seo Ji-eum; Peter Wallevik; Rudy Spiro; Josh Wood | Advice | 2021 | |
| "Impressionable" | Taemin | Kim Woo-jung; MNEK; Daniel Davidsen; Peter Wallevik; Lewis Blissett | Never Gonna Dance Again: Act 2 | 2020 | |
| "Into the Rhythm" | Taemin | Sara Sakurai; Christoffer Lauridsen; Jimmy Claeson; Jon Asher | Taemin | 2018 | |
| "It's You" | Taemin | STY; Maria Marcus; Andrew Choi; MinGtion | Famous | 2019 | |
| "Itsuka Kokode" (いつかここで) | Taemin | Sara Sakurai; Andreas Stone Johansson; Kiyohito Komatsu; Vincent DeGiorgio | Flame of Love | 2017 | |
| "Just Me and You" | Taemin | Mola; JQ; Sam Gray; Steve Manovski; Jimmy Conway; Ryan S. Jhun | Never Gonna Dance Again: Act 1 | 2020 | |
| "Light" | Taemin | Jeon Gan-di; Jonatan Gusmark; Ludvig Evers; Adrian McKinnon | Advice | 2021 | |
| "Love" | Taemin | Lee Seu-ran; Hyuk Shin; Jeff Lewis; Marco "MRey" Reyes; Jeon Byung-sun; Hong Young-in; Luket | Move | 2017 | |
| "Mars" † | Taemin | Meg.Me; Måns Ek; Matt Wong | Taemin | 2018 | |
| "Maxstep" † | Younique Unit | Yoo Young-jin | PYL Younique Volume 1 | 2012 | |
| "Monologue" (혼잣말) | Taemin | Lee Seu-ran; Robert Gerongco; Samuel Gerongco; Andrew Michael Briol | Want | 2019 | |
| "Move" † | Taemin | Seo Ji-eum; Curtis Richardson; Adien Lewis; Angélique Cinélu | Move | 2017 | |
| "My Choice" (니가 내 기준) | Taemin (with UV) | Muzie; Yoo Se-yoon | The Call Final Project | 2018 | |
| "My Day" | Taemin | Kim Min; Taylor | Navillera OST | 2021 | |
| "Mystery Lover" | Taemin | Jo Yoon-kyung; Adrian McKinnon; Mark Rankin; Ryan S. Jhun | Press It | 2016 | |
| "Named" (그 이름) | Taemin (with Jonghyun) | Ji-hoon; Rocoberry; Gaemi | Who Are You: School 2015 OST | 2015 | |
| "Nemo" (네모) | Taemin | Noday; Aisle; Park Moonchi | Never Gonna Dance Again: Act 1 | 2020 | |
| "Never Forever" | Taemin | Hwang Yoo-bin; Jesse Frasure; Nolan Sipe; Calynn Green; Josh Kerr | Want | 2017 | |
| "Night Away" (오늘 밤) | Taemin | Jo Yoon-kyung; Dave Villa; Breland; Maddy Simmen; TMM | Guilty | 2023 | |
| "Not Over You" (제자리) | Taemin | Lee Seu-ran; Mathias Holsaae; Kristoffer Fuglsang Mortensen; Malte Ebert; Gavin Brown | Guilty | 2023 | |
| "One by One" | Taemin | Lee Seu-ran; iDR; Antwann Frost; Ryan S. Jhun | Press It | 2016 | |
| "Pansy" | Taemin | Jung Young-ah; Taemin; Bram Inscore; Alma Goodman; Darin | Never Gonna Dance Again: Act 2 | 2020 | |
| "Pinocchio" (피노키오) | Taemin (with Bewhy) | JQ; Kim Jin; Mola; Bewhy; Taemin; Bram Inscore; Omega; Felix Sandman; Victoria Zaro; Zac Poor | The Call Project No.4 | 2018 | |
| "Play Me" (소나타) | Taemin | Min Yeon-jae; Harvey Mason Jr.; Damon Thomas; Mike Daley; Adonis Shropshire | Ace | 2014 | |
| "Press Your Number" † | Taemin | Tenzo & Tasco; Taemin; Jonathan Yip; Ray Romulus; Jeremy Reeves; Ray Charles McCullough II; Bruno Mars; Philip Lawrence | Press It | 2016 | |
| "Press Your Number" (Japanese version) † | Taemin | Sara Sakurai; Tenzo & Tasco; Taemin; Jonathan Yip; Ray Romulus; Jeremy Reeves; Ray Charles McCullough II; Bruno Mars; Philip Lawrence | Sayonara Hitori | 2016 | |
| "Pretty Boy" | Taemin (featuring Kai) | Jonghyun; Daniel Caesar; Ludwig Lindell; Ylva Dimberg | Ace | 2014 | |
| "Rise" (이카루스) | Taemin | Kim In-hyung; Matthew Tishler; Felicia Barton; Aaron Benward | Move | 2017 | |
| "The Rizzness" | Taemin | Lee Hyung-seok (PNP); Manifest; Jbach; Landon Sears; Kyle Buckley; Charles Roberts Nelsen; MZMC | Guilty | 2023 | |
| "Sad Kids" | Taemin | Luvssong; Ryan S. Jhun; Thomas Jones; Reuben Gray | Advice | 2021 | |
| "Say Less" | Taemin | Taemin; San Yoon; Ryan S. Jhun; Dino Medanhodzic; Jordan Shaw; Sam Merrifield | Eternal | 2024 | |
| "Sayonara Hitori" (さよならひとり) † | Taemin | Sara Sakurai; Yoko Hiramatsu; Denniz Jamm; Martin René | Sayonara Hitori | 2016 | |
| "Sekaide Ichiban Aishitahito" (世界で一番愛した人) | Taemin | Junji Ishiwatari; Hanif Sabzevari; Peo Dahl; Funk Uchino | Sayonara Hitori | 2016 | |
| "Sexuality" (Rearranged version) | Taemin | Kenzie; Jodi Marr; Eric Bazilian; Ryan S. Jhun | Press It | 2016 | |
| "Sexy in the Air" † | Taemin | Ryan S. Jhun; Znee; Jiin (Znee:Us); Eeeee; Perrie; 9june9; Dwayne "Dem Jointz" Abernathy Jr.; Taemin; Racella; Sorana Pacurar; Dre Davidson; Sean Davidson; Jun Seo | Eternal | 2024 | |
| "Shadow" | Taemin | Min Yeon-jae; Jeon Ji-eun; Hwang Seon-jeong; Kim Jeong-mi; Yoo Jae-rom; Lee Jae-hwi; Maria Marcus; Daichi; Katerina Bramley | Want | 2019 | |
| "She Loves Me, She Loves Me Not" | Taemin | Lee Hyung-seok; Tony Ferrari; Joseph Pepe; Gray Trainer; Barry Cohen | Guilty | 2023 | |
| "Slave" | Taemin | Junji Ishiwatari; Daniel Kim; Takey | Famous | 2019 | |
| "Snow Flower" (눈꽃) | Taemin | Jung Joon-il | Move-ing | 2017 | |
| "Soldier" | Taemin | Taemin; Matthew Tishler; Felicia Barton; Aaron Benward | Press It | 2016 | |
| "Spectrum" † | SM The Performance | Matthew Koma; Zedd | Non-album release | 2012 | |
| "Steps" (발걸음) | Taemin | Kim Jeong-bae | Prime Minister & I OST | 2014 | |
| "Stone Heart" (미로) | Taemin | Lee Seu-ran; Engelina Andrina Larsen; Fredrik Häggstam; Johan Gustafsson; Sebastian Lundberg | Move | 2017 | |
| "Strangers" | Taemin | Kim Min-ji; Daniel Davidsen; Peter Wallevik; Sarah Barrios; Linnea Södahl | Never Gonna Dance Again: Act 1 | 2020 | |
| "Strings" | Taemin | Hwang Ji-won; Ryan S. Jhun; Roel Rats; Joelina Drews; Vito Kovach; Marcia Sondeijker | Advice | 2021 | |
| "Tease" | Taemin | Meg.Me; Darren "Baby Dee Beats" Smith; Daniel Kim | Famous | 2019 | |
| "Think of You" (안아줄래) | Taemin | Taemin; Max Lynedoch Graham; Matt Thomson; Wilhelm Börjesson; Marcus Holmberg; James F. Reynolds | Never Gonna Dance Again: Act 2 | 2020 | |
| "Thirsty" † | Taemin | Min Yeon-jae; Joseph "Joe Millionaire" Foster; Deez; Ylva Dimberg; MZMC; Otha "Vakseen" Davis III | Move | 2017 | |
| "This is Your Day" † | SM Town | Yoo Young-jin; Kei Lim; Gifty Dankwah; Shaun Barrett; CR Kim | Non-album release | 2019 | |
| "Tiger" | Taemin | Junji Ishiwatari; Andreas Stone Johansson; Chris Meyer; Octobar | Sayonara Hitori | 2016 | |
| "Trap" † | Henry Lau (featuring Taemin and Kyuhyun) | Misfit; Svante Halldin; Emilh Tigerlantz; Geraldo Sandell | Trap | 2013 | |
| "Truth" | Taemin | JQ; Kim Hye-jung; G'harah "PK" Degeddingseze; Omar Andres Taraves; JC Chasez; VMP; Jarah Lafayette Gibson | Want | 2019 | |
| "U" (너란 말야) | Taemin | Kim Woo-joo; Zua; A Real Man | To the Beautiful You OST | 2012 | |
| "Under My Skin" † | Taemin | Junji Ishiwatari; Cesar Peralta; Ryan Curtis; Ronnie Marinari | Taemin | 2018 | |
| "The Unknown Sea" | Taemin | Znee; Eeeee; Ryan S. Jhun; Taemin; Mich Hansen; Jacob Uchorezak; Samuel Ledet; James William Miller; Sara Davis | Eternal | 2024 | |
| "Until Today" (오늘까지만) | Taemin | G.Soul; Jamil "Digi" Chammas; Justin Lucas; Deez; MZMC | Press It | 2016 | |
| "Waiting For" (해몽) | Taemin | Kim Min-ji; Noah Conrad; Rollo Spreckley; Jake Torrey | Never Gonna Dance Again: Act 1 | 2020 | |
| "Want" † | Taemin | Kenzie; Tooji Keshtkar; JFMee; Saima Irén Mian; Anne Judith Stokke Wik; Nermin Harambasic; Ronny Vidar Svendsen; Martin Mulholland; Jonas Bjørdal | Want | 2019 | |
| "Want (Outro)" | Taemin | Steven Lee | Want | 2019 | |
| "What's This Feeling" | Taemin | Junji Ishiwatari; Andrew Choi; Coach & Sendo | Taemin | 2018 | |
| "Wicked" (거절할게) | Taemin | Kenzie; Teddy Riley; Lee Hyun-seung; Dominic "DOM" Rodriguez; Andreas "Mage" Maggiani | Ace | 2014 | |
| "You Are a Miracle" † | Various artists | Kim Eana; Kim Hyung-suk; Kim Do-hyun | 2013 SBS Gayo Daejeon Friendship Project | 2013 | |

== See also ==
- List of songs recorded by Shinee
