= Taemin (album) =

- Digital and regular cover

Studio album by Taemin
- Released: November 5, 2018
- Studio: Doobdoob (Seoul); ODEN (Tokyo); Sound Pool (Seoul); SM Big Shot (Seoul); SM Blue Ocean (Seoul)
- Genre: J-pop
- Length: 43:07
- Language: Japanese
- Label: EMI; UMJ
- Producer: Nozomu Tsuchiya

Taemin chronology
Move (2017)	Taemin (2018)	Want (2019)

Singles from Taemin
- 1. "Eclipse" Released: September 26, 2018; 2. "Mars" Released: October 14, 2018; 3. "Under My Skin" Released: November 12, 2018

Taemin is the self-titled third studio album and debut Japanese studio album by South Korean singer Taemin. The album contains twelve tracks and includes Japanese versions of previously released songs by Taemin. The album was released digitally on November 5, 2018, through EMI Records and Universal Music Japan. The album's physical release occurred on November 28, 2018.

== Background and release ==
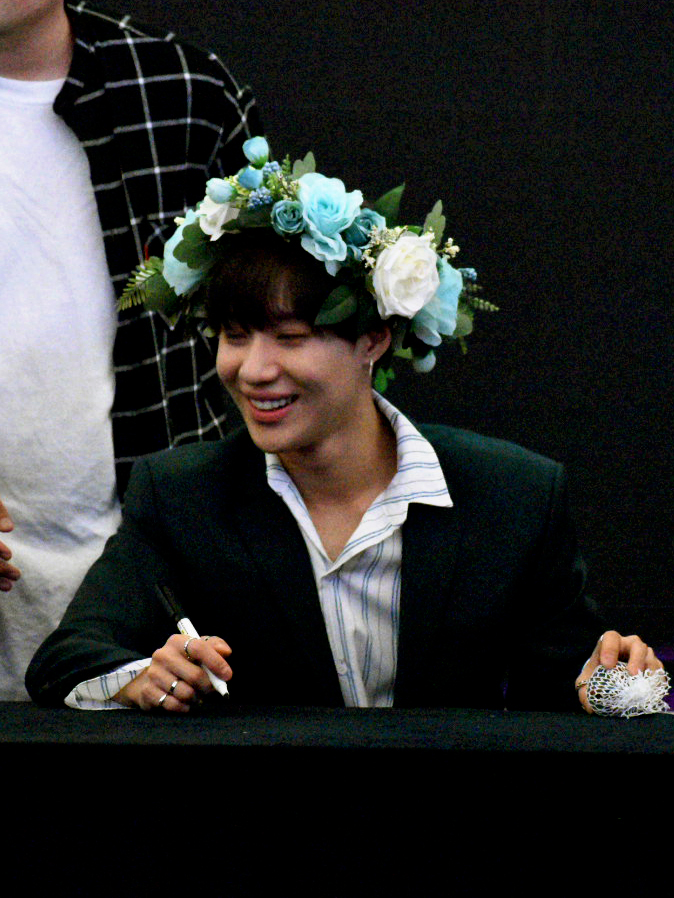
Taemin in 2018.

On September 22, 2018, the official Shinee Japanese Instagram account posted a highlight medley for the upcoming Taemin album, although at that time the album was reported to be titled Eclipse. It was also announced that the single "Eclipse" would be released on September 26.

On October 3, 2018, Taemin officially announced that he would release his first Japanese studio album on November 28, 2018. The album would feature "Eclipse" as the lead single, which was first revealed during the Sirius tour. A live version music video for the single was subsequently released on YouTube on November 6, 2018. The second single, "Mars", was released on October 14, 2018.

The song "What’s This Feeling" from the album is the theme song for the Japanese drama Final Life: Even If You Disappear Tomorrow, which Taemin starred in. The album also includes two previously released Japanese songs, "Sayonara Hitori" and "Flame of Love". "Sayonara Hitori" was released on Taemin's Sayonara Hitori EP on July 27, 2016, with a music video released earlier on July 5, 2016. Similarly, "Flame of Love" was released on Taemin's Flame of Love EP on July 18, 2017, with a music video released earlier on June 26, 2017. In addition to this, the album contains three Japanese versions of songs that were previously released in Korean by Taemin: "Drip Drop", "Danger", and "Press Your Number".

The music video for Taemin's new song "Under My Skin" was released on November 12, 2018 (November 13 JST). On November 24, 2018, Taemin hosted a release celebration for his album on TV.

The album was released in three versions: a normal version, a first press limited edition, and a fan club limited edition. The first press limited edition includes a DVD with music videos and a shooting sketch video, while the fan club limited edition includes a DVD with front-row recordings of Taemin's performance at the Pacifico Yokohama National Convention Hall during his Sirius tour.

== Track listing ==
Taemin track listing
No.	Title	Lyrics	Music	Arrangement	Length
1.	"Eclipse"	Sara Sakurai (T's Music)	Andreas Stone Johansson; Barbi Escobar; Costa Leon; Kenzie	Andreas Stone Johansson; Barbi Escobar; Costa Leon; Kenzie	3:30
2.	"Into the Rhythm"	Sara Sakurai (T's Music)	Christoffer Lauridsen; Jimmy Claeson; Jon Asher	Christoffer Lauridsen; Jimmy Claeson; Jon Asher	3:15
3.	"Drip Drop" (Japanese version)	Park Seong-hee; Hidenori Tanaka (agehasprings)	Jamil "Digi" Chammas; Jonathan "Perky Rain" Perkins; Michael Jiminez; Sara Forsberg; Jeremy "Tay" Jasper; Leven Kali; MZMC	Orange Factory Music	3:27
4.	"Flame of Love"	Amon Hayashi (Digz Inc.)	Kanata Okajima; Andreas Öberg; Yuka Otsuki (Mussashi)	Mussashi	3:52
5.	"Under My Skin"	Junji Ishiwatari	Cesar Peralta (InnerV8 Musiq); Ryan Curtis; Ronnie Marinari	Cesar Peralta (InnerV8 Musiq)	3:46
6.	"Danger" (Japanese version)	Seo Ji-eum; Sara Sakurai (T's Music)	Thomas Troelsen; Mikkel Remee Sigvardt	Thomas Troelsen; Mikkel Remee Sigvardt; Command Freaks (Iconic Sounds)	3:12
7.	"Better Man"	Junji Ishiwatari	Christoffer Lauridsen; Jimmy Claeson; Jon Asher	Christoffer Lauridsen; Jimmy Claeson; Jon Asher	3:33
8.	"Press Your Number" (Japanese version)	Tenzo & Tasco (Duble Kick); Taemin; Sara Sakurai (T's Music)	Jonathan Yip; Ray Romulus; Jeremy Reeves; Ray Charles McCullough II; Bruno Mars; Philip Lawrence	The Stereotypes; Bruno Mars; Philip Lawrence	3:48
9.	"Mars"	MEG.ME	Måns Ek; Matt Wong (The Heavyweights)	Måns Ek	3:52
10.	"What's This Feeling"	Junji Ishiwatari	Andrew Choi (ADC Music); Coach & Sendo	Andrew Choi (ADC Music); Coach & Sendo	3:41
11.	"Holy Water"	Sara Sakurai (T's Music)	Didrik Thott; Andreas Öhrn; Chris Wahle	Chris Wahle	3:40
12.	"Sayonara Hitori" (さよならひとり)	Sara Sakurai (T's Music)	Yoko Hiramatsu; Denniz Jamm; Martin René	Denniz Jamm; Martin René	3:31
Total length:					43:07

DVD – first press limited edition
No.	Title	Length
1.	"Under My Skin Music Video"
2.	"Danger (Korean Version) Music Video"
3.	"Drip Drop (Korean Version) Music Video"
4.	"Press Your Number (Korean Version) Music Video"
5.	"Sayonara Hitori Music Video"
6.	"Flame of Love Music Video"
7.	"Move (Korean Version) Music Video"
8.	"1st Album Taemin Jacket & Music Video Shooting Sketch"

DVD – fan club limited edition
No.	Title	Length
1.	"Move"
2.	"Sexuality"
3.	"Tiger"

== Charts ==
Chart performance for Taemin
Chart (2018)	Peak position
Japanese Albums (Oricon)	2
Japan Hot Albums (Billboard Japan)	2
