= Move (Taemin album) =

- Digital cover

Studio album by Taemin
- Released: October 16, 2017
- Recorded: 2017
- Studios: SM Studios, Seoul, South Korea
- Genres: Pop; R&B; synthpop
- Length: 31:41
- Language: Korean
- Labels: SM; Genie
- Producers: Curtis A. Richardson; Adien Lewis; Angelique Cinelu; Hyuk Shin; MRey; Royal Dive; JinXJin; Deez; Justin Phillip Stein; Che Jamal Pope; Jamil "Digi" Chammas; Matthew Tishler; Joe Millionaire; Engelina; Trinity Music; Rice n' Peas; Yuka Otsuki; Kanata Okajima; Andreas Öberg

Taemin chronology
Flame of Love (2017)	Move (2017)	Taemin (2018)

Singles from Move
- 1. "Move" Released: October 16, 2017; 2. "Thirsty" Released: November 10, 2017

Repackaged edition cover
- "Move-ing" album cover

Singles from Move-ing
- 1. "Day and Night" Released: December 10, 2017

Move is the second Korean studio album by South Korean singer Taemin. The album consists of nine tracks including the title track, "Move". It was released digitally and physically on October 16, 2017, through SM Entertainment and distributed by Genie Music. A Korean version of Taemin's Japanese single, "Flame of Love", also appears on the album. The album was re-released under the title Move-ing on December 10, 2017.

== Background and release ==
On September 28, 2017, SM Entertainment announced Taemin's second Korean studio album for October 16, 2017. Prior to the release of the album, Taemin previewed the songs from Move at his first Korean concert, titled Off-Sick, on October 15, 2017, in front of 10,000 fans. The album was released a day later on October 16, 2017, through various music sites and contained a total of nine tracks. Its lead single, "Move", was accompanied by three different music videos—the first was the official music video for the song that featured the singer in a variety of scenes, while the second and third videos focused on the choreography itself; the latter featured Japanese choreographer Koharu Sugawara. The album also included "Heart Stop", a light-hearted duet with labelmate Red Velvet's Seulgi, and a Korean version of Taemin's second Japanese single "Flame of Love", previously released on July 18, 2017.

On December 5, it was reported that a repackaged edition of the album, titled Move-ing, would be released on December 10. Move-ing contained four additional tracks, including the single "Day and Night".

== Singles ==
"Move" was not supposed to be the album's original promotional track, as the company had chosen the album's B-side "Love" instead. However, Taemin decided against the song, since he did not think it would allow him to show his true identity. He aimed to break gender stereotypes and the perceived limits of K-pop's artistry and worked with the Japanese choreographer Koharu Sugawara and a team of female dancers to create the choreography for the song with the intentional to use Taemin's soft frame as a starting point to counter the gender norms typified by many K-pop dances, stating:

My aim was to find a middle ground, mixing both masculine and feminine movements into the choreography together. My body shape is like that of a dancer’s, it’s not too masculine or overly muscular and I wanted to take advantage of that. I thought I could show the soft lines like the dance movements of a ballet dancer by adding subtlety to my choreography. I wanted to break the idea of what male performers are supposed to show, what performances girl groups are supposed to show. I really wanted to break those labels, showing that dance is a form of art.

He also explained putting out three different music videos at once was something he wanted to try in order to show the different elements of the choreography as well as a strategical decision to make the choreography seem both possible and impossible at the same time and that he wanted to focus on bringing nuances into the music rather than having big movements. Taemin also appeared at the Seoul Fashion Week in October 2017 to perform "Move", which was named as a standout moment of the season of Seoul Fashion Week by W Magazine writer Todd Plummer.

== Accolades ==
Awards and nominations
Award ceremony	Year	Category	Result	Ref.
Golden Disc Awards	2018	Album Bonsang	Nominated	
Korean Music Awards	2018	Best Pop Album	Nominated	

== Track listing ==
Move track listing
No.	Title	Lyrics	Music	Arrangement	Length
1.	"Move"	Seo Ji-eum	Curtis Richardson (WayBetta); Adien Lewis (WayBetta); Angélique Cinélu	Curtis Richardson (WayBetta); Adien Lewis (WayBetta); Angélique Cinélu	3:31
2.	"Love"	Lee Seu-ran	Hyuk Shin (Joombas); Jeff Lewis (Joombas); Marco "MRey" Reyes (Joombas); Jeon Byung-sun (Royal Dive) (Joombas); Hong Young-in (Royal Dive) (Joombas); Luket (Joombas)	Joombas	3:49
3.	"Crazy 4 U"	Hwang Yoo-bin	Jin Suk Choi; Deez; Justin Philip Stein; Christopher "Che" Jamal Pope	Jin Suk Choi; Deez; Justin Philip Stein; Christopher "Che" Jamal Pope	3:35
4.	"Heart Stop" (featuring Seulgi of Red Velvet)	JQ (Makeumine Works); Kim Jin (Makeumine Works); Mola (Makeumine Works)	Jamil "Digi" Chammas; Leven Kali; Ylva Dimberg (The Kennel); MZMC	Jamil "Digi" Chammas	2:55
5.	"Rise" (이카루스; Ikaruseu; lit. 'Icarus')	Kim In-hyung	Matthew Tishler; Felicia Barton; Aaron Benward	Matthew Tishler	3:31
6.	"Thirsty"	Min Yeon-jae (lalala Studio)	Joseph "Joe Millionaire" Foster; Deez; Ylva Dimberg (The Kennel); MZMC; Otha "Vakseen" Davis III	Joseph "Joe Millionaire" Foster; Deez	3:26
7.	"Stone Heart" (미로; Miro; lit. 'Maze')	Lee Seu-ran	Engelina Andrina Larsen; Fredrik Häggstam (Trinity Music); Johan Gustafsson (Trinity Music); Sebastian Lundberg (Trinity Music)	Engelina Andrina Larsen; Trinity Music	3:26
8.	"Back to You"	Seo Ji-eum	Mike Woods (Rice N' Peas); Kevin White (Rice N' Peas); Andrew Bazzi (Rice N' Peas); MZMC	Rice N' Peas	3:37
9.	"Flame of Love" (Korean version) (Bonus track)	Jo Yoon-kyung; Amon Hayashi (Digz Inc.)	Kanata Okajima; Andreas Öberg; Yuka Otsuki (Mussashi)	Mussashi	3:51
Total length:					31:52

Move-ing track listing
No.	Title	Lyrics	Music	Arrangement	Length
1.	"Day and Night" (낮과 밤; Natgwa Bam)	Taemin	Hyun Hwang (MonoTree); Taemin	Hyun Hwang (MonoTree)	3:13
2.	"Move"	Seo Ji-eum	Curtis Richardson (WayBetta); Adien Lewis (WayBetta); Angélique Cinélu	Curtis Richardson (WayBetta); Adien Lewis (WayBetta); Angélique Cinélu	3:31
3.	"Love"	Lee Seu-ran	Hyuk Shin (Joombas); Jeff Lewis (Joombas); Marco "MRey" Reyes (Joombas); Jeon Byung-sun (Royal Dive) (Joombas); Hong Young-in (Royal Dive) (Joombas); Luket (Joombas)	Joombas	3:49
4.	"Snow Flower" (눈꽃; Nunkkot)	Jung Joon-il (MY Music)	Jung Joon-il (MY Music)	Kwon Young-chan (MY Music)	4:34
5.	"Crazy 4 U"	Hwang Yoo-bin	Jin Suk Choi; Deez; Justin Philip Stein; Christopher "Che" Jamal Pope	Jin Suk Choi; Deez; Justin Philip Stein; Christopher "Che" Jamal Pope	3:35
6.	"Heart Stop" (featuring Seulgi of Red Velvet)	JQ (Makeumine Works); Kim Jin (Makeumine Works); Mola (Makeumine Works)	Jamil "Digi" Chammas; Leven Kali; Ylva Dimberg (The Kennel); MZMC	Jamil "Digi" Chammas	2:55
7.	"Rise" (이카루스; Ikaruseu; lit. 'Icarus')	Kim In-hyung	Matthew Tishler; Felicia Barton; Aaron Benward	Matthew Tishler	3:31
8.	"I'm Crying" (Korean version)	Jo Yoon-kyung; MEG.ME	Kevin Charge (TG Publishing); Yumiko Okada; Grace Tone; Hide Nakamura	Kevin Charge (TG Publishing)	5:43
9.	"Thirsty"	Min Yeon-jae (lalala Studio)	Joseph "Joe Millionaire" Foster; Deez; Ylva Dimberg (The Kennel); MZMC; Otha "Vakseen" Davis III	Joseph "Joe Millionaire" Foster; Deez; }	3:26
10.	"Stone Heart" (미로; Miro; lit. 'Maze')	Lee Seu-ran	Engelina Andrina Larsen; Fredrik Häggstam (Trinity Music); Johan Gustafsson (Trinity Music); Sebastian Lundberg (Trinity Music)	Engelina Andrina Larsen; Trinity Music	3:26
11.	"Back to You"	Seo Ji-eum	Mike Woods (Rice N' Peas); Kevin White (Rice N' Peas); Andrew Bazzi (Rice N' Peas); MZMC	Rice N' Peas	3:37
12.	"Hypnosis" (최면; Choemyeon) (Rearranged version)	Lee Ji-eun (Music Cube); Tesung Kim (Iconic Sounds)	Kim Yong-sin (Iconic Sounds); Tesung Kim (Iconic Sounds); Joseph "220" Park (Iconic Sounds)	Iconic Sounds; 13	5:36
13.	"Flame of Love" (Korean version) (Bonus track)	Jo Yoon-kyung; Amon Hayashi (Digz Inc.)	Kanata Okajima; Andreas Öberg; Yuka Otsuki (Mussashi)	Mussashi	3:51
Total length:					45:15

== Charts ==
=== Weekly charts ===
Weekly chart performance for Move
Chart (2017)	Peak position	
Chart (2017)	Move	Move-ing
Japanese Albums (Oricon)	11	—
Japan Hot Albums (Billboard Japan)	12	47
South Korean Albums (Gaon)	2	3
US World Albums (Billboard)	3	11

=== Monthly charts ===
Monthly chart performance for Move
Chart (2017)	Peak position	
Chart (2017)	Move	Move-ing
Japanese Albums (Oricon)	49	—
South Korean Albums (Gaon)	6	7

== Release history ==
Release history and formats for Move
Edition	Date	Region	Format	Label
Move	October 16, 2017	South Korea	CD; digital download; streaming	SM Entertainment; Genie Music
Move	October 16, 2017	Various	Digital download; streaming	SM Entertainment
Move-ing	December 10, 2017	South Korea	Digital download; streaming	SM Entertainment
Move-ing	December 10, 2017	Various	Digital download; streaming	SM Entertainment
Move-ing	December 11, 2017	South Korea	CD	SM Entertainment; Genie Music
