= Renuncio =

Coordinates: 42°19′N 3°45′W

Renuncio, Spain
- village
- Interactive map of Renuncio, Spain
- Municipality: Burgos

Area
  - Total: 3.52 km^{2} (1.36 sq mi)
  - Water: 0.0 km^{2} (0 sq mi)

Population (2006)
  - Total: 99 (city proper)
  - Density: 28.13/km^{2} (72.9/sq mi)
- Time zone: UTC+1 (CET)
  - Summer (DST): UTC+2 (CEST)
- Website: http://www.renuncio.com/

Renuncio is a village of the province of Burgos, in the autonomous community of Castile and León, Spain.

It has 99 inhabitants, and is near Burgos. The local economy is primarily based on agriculture.

Town Holidays: San Antón Abad (January 17) and Santa Catalina.
