= Christoffer Lauridsen =

Danish-Swedish songwriter and producer

Christoffer Semelius (aka. Christoffer Lauridsen) (born 1 August 1986) is a Danish-Swedish songwriter and producer working out of Stockholm. He has produced and written for artists such as Red Velvet, Got7, Wanna One, Martina Stoessel, and Chord Overstreet.

Early in his career Christoffer moved to the United Kingdom where he worked as an assistant engineer in a recording studio. Shortly after his time in the UK Christoffer was hired to work in one of Copenhagen's prime recording facilities to engineer jazz and classical recordings. Christoffer studied music production in Växjö, Sweden, and afterwards moved to Stockholm where he worked as a producer/songwriter in collaboration with Anders Bagge, Stefan Örn and Johan Kronlund for several years.

Christoffer is a multi-platinum certified songwriter who has co-written/produced songs for/with several international writers/artists and has contributed to several international Billboard charts and won "Song of the year" with Umpah Umpah. He has also done work for Eurovision Song Contest and collaborated with Jay-Z early in his career.

"Losing the Love"(produced and co-written by Christoffer) is featured in the Disney movie titled Tini: El gran cambio de Violetta starring Martina Stoessel, as well as on her debut album. When released on April 29 the album went Gold in Argentina and topped the charts in several countries.

== Songwriting/producer discography ==
Title	Year	Album	Songwriter	Producer
"Mogę wszystko, nic nie muszę"	2014	Agata Dziarmagowska – Mogę wszystko, nic nie muszę (Single)	check	check
"Drop Drop"	2014	Agata Dziarmagowska – Drop Drop (Single)	check	check
"People Are Lonely - Chritoffer Lauridsen Remix"	2014	Gravitonas, Army Of Lovers – People Are Lonely		check
"Tick Tock"	2014	Mariya Yaremchuk – Tick Tock		check
"Blisko Mnie"	2015	Agata Dziarmagowska – Blisko Mnie - (Single)	check	check
"President"	2015	Agata Dziarmagowska – President - (Single)	check	check
"Renuncio - (Christoffer Lauridsen Remix)"	2015	Ruth Lorenzo – Renuncio		check
"The Shining"	2015	Alien Huang – ALiEN		check
"Love You Out Loud"	2015	Benjamin Lasnier – Love You Out Loud	check	check
"Losing The Love"	2016	Tini – Martina Stoessel	check	check
"Touch"	2016	She La La Summer Time – Kis-My-Ft2	check	check
"Somebody To Hurt"	2017	Benjamin Lasnier – Somebody To Hurt'	check	check
"Ordinary People"	2017	Levina – Unexpected	check	
"Hot!x2"	2017	Kis-My-Ft2 – Hot!x2'	check	check
"Sweet Birthday"	2018	KAT-TUN – Sweet birthday'	check	check
"Into The Rhythm"	2018	Taemin – Into The Rhythm'	check	check
"Umpah Umpah"	2019	Red Velvet – The ReVe Festival: Day 2'	check	check
"Crash & Burn"	2019	GOT7 – Call My Name'	check	check
