= Flame of Love =

- Digital/regular cover

EP by Taemin
- Released: July 3, 2017
- Studio: ODEN (Tokyo)
- Genre: J-pop
- Length: 20:36
- Language: Japanese
- Label: EMI; UMJ
- Producer: Nozumu Tsuchiya; Lee Soo-man

Taemin chronology
Sayonara Hitori (2016)	Flame of Love (2017)	Move (2017)

Singles from Flame of Love
- 1. "Flame of Love" Released: June 28, 2017

Flame of Love is the second Japanese extended play (third overall) by South Korean singer Taemin under EMI Records, a division of Universal Music Japan. It was released digitally on July 3, 2017, and physically on July 18, 2017. The title track was released on June 28, 2017. Taemin performed songs from the EP at his first solo concert in Japan at the Nippon Budokan in Tokyo, which attracted 28,000 fans. The visual contents were co-produced by Mika Ninagawa. A deluxe edition comes with a bonus DVD with a music video for the title song, its dance version, and shooting sketch for cover artwork and music video. After the release, the album immediately ranked number one on Japan's daily albums charts, selling more than 45,000 copies.

== Track listing ==
Flame of Love track listing
No.	Title	Lyrics	Music	Arrangement	Length
1.	"Flame of Love"	Amon Hayashi	Kanata Okajima; Andreas Öberg; Yuka Otsuki (Mussashi)	Mussashi	3:54
2.	"I'm Crying"	Meg.Me	Kevin Charge; Yumiko Okada; Grace Tone; Hide Nakamura	Kevin Charge	5:45
3.	"Do It Baby"	Sara Sakurai	Sebastian Thott; Ninos Hanna	Sebastian Thott	2:42
4.	"Door"	Sara Sakurai	Andreas Stone Johansson; Andreas Öberg; Fredrik Hult; Steven Lee	Andreas Stone Johansson	3:57
5.	"Itsuka Kokode" (いつかここで)	Sara Sakurai	Andreas Stone Johansson; Kiyohito Komatsu; Vincent DeGiorgio	Andreas Stone Johansson	4:04
Total length:					20:22

DVD
No.	Title	Length
1.	"Flame of Love" (music video)
2.	"Flame of Love" (MV dance version)
3.	"Jacket & MV Shooting Sketch"

== Charts ==
Chart performance for Flame of Love
Chart	Peak position
Japanese Albums (Oricon)	2
Japanese Hot Albums (Billboard Japan)	2

== Sales ==
Chart	Amount
Oricon physical sales	51,752+
