= Want (EP) =

- Digital and Want version cover

EP by Taemin
- Released: February 11, 2019
- Studios: Seoul; SM Blue Cup (Seoul); SM LVYIN (Seoul); SM SSAM (Seoul); SM Yellow Tail (Seoul)
- Genres: Pop; R&B
- Length: 20:40
- Language: Korean
- Labels: SM; IRIVER
- Producers: Ronny Vidar Svendsen; Mats Koray Genc; David Björk; Didrik Thott; Maria Marcus; G'harah "PK" Degeddingseze; Jesse Frasure; Robert Gerongco; Samuel Gerongco; Steven Lee

Taemin chronology
| Taemin (2018) | Want (2019) | Famous (2019) |

Singles from Want
- 1. "Want" Released: February 11, 2019

Want is the second Korean extended play (fourth overall) by South Korean singer Taemin. It was released on February 11, 2019, through SM Entertainment. The EP features seven tracks along with the title track and lead single, "Want". Want debuted at number one on the Gaon Album Chart.

== Promotion ==
A minute-long concept film as well as teaser images for the cover, photoshoot and track listing of the EP were released from January 29 to February 2 through Shinee's social media, and Taemin's official website. A showcase hosted by Super Junior's Eunhyuk was held on February 11 at the Sangmyung Art Center in Seoul, where Taemin had the chance to perform and talk about the making of the release.

== Accolades ==
Year-end lists
| Critic/Publication | List | Song | Rank | Ref. |
|---|---|---|---|---|
| Refinery29 | The Best K-Pop Songs Of 2019 | "Want" | 24 | |
| Rolling Stone India | 10 Best K-pop Music Videos of 2019 | "Want" | —N/a | |

Music program awards
| Song | Program | Date | Ref. |
|---|---|---|---|
| "Want" | Show Champion | February 20, 2019 | |
| "Want" | Music Bank | February 22, 2019 | |

== Track listing ==
Want track listing
| No. | Title | Lyrics | Music | Arrangement | Length |
|---|---|---|---|---|---|
| 1. | "Want" | Kenzie | Tooji Keshtkar; JFMee; Saima Irén Mian; Anne Judith Stokke Wik; Nermin Harambašić; Ronny Vidar Svendsen; Martin Mulholland; Jonas Bjørdal | Dsign Music; JFMee | 3:28 |
| 2. | "Artistic Groove" | Jo Yoon-kyung | David Björk; Didrik Thott | David Björk; Didrik Thott | 3:37 |
| 3. | "Shadow" | Min Yeon-jae (lalala Studio); Jeon Ji-eun (January 8th (lalala Studio)); Hwang Seon-jeong (January 8th (lalala Studio)); Kim Jeong-mi (January 8th (lalala Studio)); Yoo Jae-rom (lalala Studio); Lee Jae-hwi (lalala Studio) | Maria Marcus; Daichi (FRH Inc.); Katerina Bramley (Notting Hill Music) | Maria Marcus | 3:09 |
| 4. | "Truth" | JQ (Makeumine Works); Kim Hye-jung (Makeumine Works) | G'harah "PK" Degeddingseze (80hdmuzic); Omar Andres Taraves; Joshua Scott Chasez; VMP; Jarah Lafayette Gibson | G'harah "PK" Degeddingseze (80hdmuzic) | 3:19 |
| 5. | "Never Forever" | Hwang Yoo-bin | Jesse Frasure; Nolan Sipe; Calynn Green; Josh Kerr | Jesse Frasure | 2:48 |
| 6. | "Monologue" (Korean: 혼잣말; RR: Honjanmal) | Lee Seu-ran | Robert Gerongco; Samuel Gerongco; Andrew Michael Briol | Kuya Productions | 3:20 |
| 7. | "Want" (Outro) | | Steven Lee | Steven Lee | 0:59 |
| Total length: | | | | | 20:40 |

== Charts ==
=== Weekly charts ===
Weekly chart performance for Want
| Chart (2019) | Peak position |
|---|---|
| French Download Albums (SNEP) | 45 |
| Japanese Albums (Oricon) | 15 |
| Japanese Hot Albums (Billboard Japan) | 11 |
| South Korean Albums (Gaon) | 1 |
| UK Album Downloads (Official Charts) | 59 |
| US Heatseekers Albums (Billboard) | 5 |
| US World Albums (Billboard) | 4 |

=== Year-end charts ===
Year-end chart performance for Want
| Chart (2019) | Position |
|---|---|
| South Korea (Gaon) | 54 |
