= Kanata Okajima =

- Born: Kanata Okajima; July 7, 1984 (age 42)
- Origin: Japan; Victor Music College
- Genres: Pop; J-pop; R&B; Dance
- Occupations: Singer, Songwriter, Lyricist, Rapper
- Years active: 2004–present

Kanata Okajima (Japanese: 岡嶋かな多, Okajima Kanata) is a Latin Grammy nominated, million selling songwriter, vocal producer.

She has accrued more than 190 No.#1 hits, and got the Japan Record Award on 2017 & 2025

She co-wrote “Crystal Snow” by BTS , "DA DA DANCE” by Babymetal that went No.1 on US Billboard Rock Chart, and also “Odorouze!” by Snow Man, that sold million on 2026.

Her recent work includes many established artists such as Aespa, Twice, Le Sserafim, I-dle, Ado, Jax Jones, Becky Hill, Ive, TXT, Honne, NCT127, Illit, Pablo Alborán and theme song of One Piece to name just a few.

From 2020, she begins to be recognized as one of the most successful female songwriters in Japan, also as a mother of 2 sons. She was featured in a famous TV documentary called "Seven Rule" and got the offer to release her book called “The road to your dream isnʼt a one-way street”

== Career ==
She first appeared on Kors.K's "Bounce Bounce Bounce" (Beatmania IIDX 18, 2010) and was the vocalist for all songs on Lady Gaga's punk cover album "A Gag Punk" (2011). In 2013, she signed with Sweden's Roasting House and began her international career.

Her lyrics for "Happiness," the theme of Dear Sister (2014), became the most searched lyrics of the year's second half. She contributed to Girls' Generation's album, Love & Peace (Japan Gold Disc Award, 2014) and later won the Japan Record Award for Song of the Year with Daichi Miura's "Excite" (2017).

She co-wrote BTS's "Crystal Snow," which hit #1 in 17 countries, and contributed to Namie Amuro's best album Finally (2018, double-million seller). She penned Miura Haruma's drama theme "Fight for your heart" (2019), and co-wrote Babymetal's "Da Da Dance" for Metal Galaxy (2020), the first Japanese album to top Billboard's Rock Albums chart. The work also won MTV VMAJ's Album of the Year (2021).

Her songs for West ("Shōko," platinum, 2021), BTS (BTS, The Best, million-seller, 2021), and Snow Man (Snow Mania S1, million-seller, 2022; Album of the Year at Japan Gold Disc Awards) cemented her status as a million-seller songwriter three years running.

She released her book There Isn't Just One Way to Make Your Dreams Come True (2023), directed Sooyoung's solo debut single in Japan (2024), and wrote Snow Man's "Kissin' My Lips," included in The Best 2020-2025, which sold 1.105M copies on its first day (2025). That same year, Leo Ieiri's "Mikansei" surpassed 100M streams, and she collaborated with Jax Jones on the anime Beyblade X ending theme.

In November 2025, Lilas Ikuta (Yoasobi) participated as a topliner in the production of two songs, collaborating with world-renowned artists Pablo Alborán and Orelsan.

In December 2025, Milk's "Ii Jan" (written and composed by her) received the Excellent Work Award at the 67th Japan Record Awards. Additionally, "Ii Jan" was nominated for the 2025 Buzzword Awards (Gendai Yogo no Kiso Chishiki Selection), and was selected as the entrance march song for the 98th National High School Baseball Invitational Tournament (Senbatsu) in spring 2026.

In 2026, she received a Latin Grammy nomination for Best Contemporary Pop Album for Pablo Alborán’s “Perfectos Imperfectos (feat. Lilas).”

== Awards and honors ==
=== THE JAPAN GOLD DISC AWARD ===
- 27th Best 3 Albums – Asia Category: 200miles / "Just Crazy" / Jang Keun Suk
- 28th Best 3 Albums – Asia Category: Gossip girls, DO THE CATWALK / "LOVE&PEACE" / Girls' Generation
- 32nd Album of the Year: Big Boys Cry / "Finally" / Namie Amuro
- 33rd Album of the Year – Asia Category: Crystal Snow / "FACE YOURSELF" / BTS
- 33rd Best 3 Albums – Asia Category:
- Crystal Snow / "FACE YOURSELF" / BTS. BDZ / "Wishing" / TWICE
- 35th Best 5 Singles: KISSIN' MY LIPS / "KISSIN' MY LIPS / Stories" / Snow Man
- 36th Album of the Year: KISSIN' MY LIPS / "Snow Mania S1" / Snow Man
- 36th Album of the Year – Asia Category: BTS, THE BEST / BTS
- 36th Best 3 Albums – Asia Category: 0X1=LOVESONG (I Know I Love You) feat. Ikuta Rira [Japanese Ver.] / "Chaotic Wonderland" / TOMORROW X TOGETHER
- 36th Best 3 Music Videos: KISSIN' MY LIPS / "Snow Man ASIA TOUR 2D.2D." / Snow Man
- 37th Best 5 Singles: Passion Fruit no Tabekata / "Suki to Iu no wa Rock da Ze" / Nogizaka46
- 37th Music Video of the Year: KISSIN' MY LIPS / "Snow Man LIVE TOUR 2021 Manias" / Snow Man
- 37th Best 3 Music Videos: Shouko / "Johnny's Festival ~ Thank you 2021 Hello 2022~" / WEST.
- 37th Best 3 Music Videos: Naughty Girl / "King & Prince CONCERT TOUR 2021 Re Sense " / King & Prince
- 38th Album of the Year (Japanese Music): "Naughty Girl" / Mr.5 / King & Prince
- 38th Best 3 Music Videos (Japanese Music): "Naughty Girl" / King & Prince First DOME TOUR 2022 〜Mr.〜 / King & Prince
- 38th Music Video of the Year (Japanese Music): "KISSIN' MY LIPS" / Snow Man 1st DOME Tour 2023 i DO ME / Snow Man
- 40th Album of the Year (Japanese Music): "KISSIN' MY LIPS" / THE BEST 2020–2025 / Snow Man
- 40th Album of the Year (Asia): "Deja Vu [Japanese Ver.]", "Hoshi no Uta [Japanese Ver.]" / Starkissd / TOMORROW X TOGETHER
- 40th Music Video of the Year (Japanese Music): "KISSIN' MY LIPS" / Snow Man Dome Tour 2024 RAYS / Snow Man
- 40th Best 3 Music Videos (Japanese Music): "SPICY" / YOUNG OLD / SixTONES

== Discography ==
→For a list of works provided to J-POP, please refer here.

=== Western ===
- Adexe&Nau,わーすた
  - "Yo Quiero Vivir"
- Arjun Kanungo,れん
  - "Tell Me"
- Arvingarna
  - "Bara jag och du"
- HONNE
  - "Warm on a Cold Night"
  - "la la la that's how it goes"
- 88rising / ATARASHII GAKKO! & Warren Hue
  - "Freaks"
- Pink Sweat$
  - "17"
- Angelica
  - "Calling"
- Che'Nelle
  - "Happiness (TV drama「Dear sister」)"
  - "奇跡"
  - "君がいれば"
    - "Fall in Love Again"
  - "Fun"
  - "HIKARI"
  - "ラストボーイ"
  - "SOS" （TV drama 「FuuFu no Himitsu」)
- Gabby Mae
  - "Path Ahead"
- Gia & J1
  - "Xfa Quédate"
- Jax Jones × Ado
  - "Stay Gold"
- KIRA （feat.Kagamine Rin & Kagamine Len）
  - "FAKE HEART"
- Orelsan
  - "Plus rien' (feat.Lilas[YOASOBI]）
- Pablo Alborán
  - "Perfectos imperfectos" (feat. Lilas[YOASOBI]）
- Ren Kai
  - "Mr. Dalaba 大喇叭"
- Shao Hao
  - "Where Is My Home"
- Kaiya Campbell
  - "Pick Up the Pieces"
- Becky Hill
  - ">>>hands on me<<<"
- Shery M
  - "Limitless"
  - "Bubblin"

=== K-Pop ===
HYBE

- BTS
  - "Crystal Snow'
- TOMORROW × TOGETHER
  - "0X1=LOVESONG (I Know I Love You) (feat. Rira Ikuta)" (Japanese ver.)
  - "GOOD BOYS GONE BAD" (Japanese ver.)
  - "Deja vu" (Japanese ver.)
  - "Hoshi no uta" (Japanese ver.)
- LE SSERAFIM
  - "FEARLESS" (Japanese ver.)
  - "UNFORGIVEN" (Japanese ver.)
  - "Star Signs"
  - "CRAZY" (Japanese ver.)
  - "Kawaii" (Prod. Gen Hoshino)
- GFRIEND
  - "BEAUTIFUL"
- &TEAM
  - "バズ恋(BUZZ LOVE)"
  - "Running with the pack"
  - "Blind Love"
- BOYNEXTDOOR
  - "Earth, Wind & Fire" (Japanese Ver.)
  - "Count to Love"
- ILLIT
  - "借りてきた猫（Do the Dance)"（Japanese Ver.）
  - "I Got Your Back (feat. HANA)"
  - "Swingin' Magic"

JYP

- TWICE
  - "Wishing"
- NiziU
  - "Need U"
  - "9 Colors"

SM

- aespa
  - "Sun and Moon"
- BoA
  - "LOOK BOOK"
  - "Message"
  - "Shout it Out"
  - "歩幅 - Hohaba"
- Girls' Generation
  - "DO THE CATWALK"
  - "Gossip Girls"
- Sooyoung of Girls' Generation
  - 'Unstoppable" (Japan Solo debut single produce)
  - "C.A.L.M"
  - "Konosekaini Utsutterunoha Dare"
  - "Call me"
- Red Velvet
  - "You better know"
- SHINee
  - "BOYS WILL BE BOYS"
  - "To Your Heart"
  - "Run With Me"
  - "Seesaw"
- Taemin of SHINee
  - "Flame of Love"
  - "Colours"
- NCT 127
  - "Dreaming"

STARSHIP

- IVE
  - "LOVE DIVE" -Japanese ver.-
  - "Classic"

WAKEONE

- Kep1er (Girls Planet 999)
  - "SHINE"
- izna
  - "DUMB HOT!"

CUBE

- 4minute
  - "WHY" (TV drama「Akutou」）
  - "FIRST"
  - "DREAMS COME TRUE"
  - "グッバイ"
- i-dle
  - "Fate"
  - "Farewell to the World"
- LIGHTSUM
  - "どうして - Doshite"

==== THEBLACKLABEL ====
- MEOVV
  - "ME ME ME"

ModHaus

- tripleS moon
  - "Dream Dress"
  - "DNA"
- tripleS zenith
  - "See You"

==== Betty music ====
- JINNY
  - "Everglow"

F&F Entertainment

- UNIS
  - "Gimisama⭐︎"

THE MUZE

- RESCENE
  - "Finest Thing"

Others

- JUNIEL
  - "Summer Scene"
- gugudan
  - "Could This Be Love"
- SHAUN
  - "Way Back Home" (Japanese Ver.)
  - "For a While"
  - "Terminal" (Japanese Ver.)
  - "Bad Habits" (Japanese Ver.)
- Kang Daniel
  - "Joy Ride"
  - "TRIP"
  - "Supernova" (Japanese Ver.)
- SUPER NOVA (Choshinsei)
  - "Shining Star"
  - "Kimi ni Aitakute"
  - "J.P. ~REBORN~"
  - "Evidence of LUV"
  - "Get Wild"
  - "WHY" (Japanese Ver.)
- Bolbbalgan4
  - "LOVE"
  - "Watashi no Shishunki e"
  - "Some"
  - "Watashi Dake, Haru"
  - "Uchuu wo Ageru"
  - "Watashi Dake Dame na Koi"
  - "YOU"
  - "Suki da to Itte"
- LOONA
  - "LOVE CHERRY MOTION"
- Z-Girls
  - "What You Waiting For"
- Jang Keun Suk
  - "200miles"
- Shinhwa
  - "Never Give Up"
- INFINITE
  - "D.N.A"
  - "For You" (Japanese Ver.)
- MYNAME
  - "Baby Tonight"
  - "K.O. Monster"
  - "Good Bye To You"
  - "Love Struck"
  - "Kiseki"
  - "We are"
  - "I'm not a bad boy" (Japanese Ver.)
- ROMEO
  - "Give Me Your Heart"
  - "Devil"
  - "Dream Out Loud"
  - "One More Night"
  - "I. The Dawn - Chinmoku -"
  - "II. The Moon - Aoi Tsuki -"
  - "III. The Touch - Rinkaku -"
  - "IV. The Thirst - Katsubou -"
  - "V. The Fate - Samayoi -"
- AOA
  - "OK"
  - "WOW WAR TONIGHT"
  - "Love Gave Me You"
  - "Perfect Strangers" (Japanese Ver.)
- AFTERSCHOOL
  - "Super Sexy"
  - "Ms. Independent"
  - "Tell Me"
  - "SHINE"
  - "Rip off"
  - "Rambling Girls"
  - "Broken Heart"
  - "Gimmie Love"
  - "Just In Time"
  - "Shampoo"
  - "Lady Luck"
  - "Heaven"
  - "Crazy Driver"
- Orange Caramel
  - "Milk Shake"
  - "Ramu no Love Song"
  - "Ain♡"
  - "Mahou Shoujo"
  - "Bangkok City"
  - "Tenshi no Wink"
  - "Melody Day"
    - "SPEED UP"
- Led Apple
  - "Greatest World"
- Nicole of KARA
  - "Happy Day"
- Jun of U-KISS
  - "Phenomenal World"
  - "Circle of Love"
  - "Come Alive"
  - "My Way feat. Reddy"
- Apeace
  - "one"

=== Other ===
- Vivian Hsu
  - "Nice and Naughty"
  - "Sunday Morning"
- SHOW
  - "Dante"
  - "Hero"
  - "Runner"
- Jay Chou
  - "Wont' cry 說好不哭"
- 金莎演
  - "全世界我只贪一个他"（作曲)
- TYT - Typhoon Teens
  - "Catch Love, Girl"

== Overseas Work and Creative Activities ==
Since 2013, Kanata Okajima has actively participated in a range of international songwriting camps, music production sessions, and creative exchanges, working across Europe, Asia, and Latin America. These experiences have expanded her global network and deepened her cross-cultural collaborations in pop and contemporary music.

- Eurovision Songwriting Camp Brussels, Belgium – June 2023
- Out of the Woods Songwriting Camp Norway – September 2023
- MÜST International Music Creation Camp Taipei, Taiwan – September 2023
- Fjord MGP Camp Oslo, Norway – April 2024
- Writers Off the Block The Netherlands – April 2024
- SONY / Warner Latin KIZUNA Camp Colombia – March 2024
- Eurovision Songwriting Camp Brussels, Belgium – June 2024
- Writing and Recording Sessions Seoul, South Korea – July 2024
- London Songwriting Camp London, United Kingdom – November 2024
- RIGaLIVE Songwriting Camp Riga, Latvia – November 2024
